= Nordic combined at the Winter World University Games =

- Events: 7 (men: 4; women: 3)

Games
- 1959; 1960; 1961; 1962; 1963; 1964; 1965; 1966; 1967; 1968; 1970; 1970; 1973; 1972; 1975; 1975; 1977; 1978; 1979; 1981; 1983; 1985; 1987; 1989; 1991; 1993; 1995; 1997; 1999; 2001; 2003; 2005; 2007; 2009; 2011; 2013; 2015; 2017; 2019; 2023; 2025

Nordic combined events have been contested at the Universiade since 1960, though they were not included in 1975 and 1981. Since Erzurum 2011, the sport has become an optional sport in the Universiade. Starting with the 2023 edition, women's and mixed events are also on the program.

== Events ==
Event	60	62	64	66	68	70	72	78	83	85	87	89	91	93	95	97	99	01	03	05	07	09	11	13	15	17	Years
Individual Gundersen	•	•	•	•	•	•	•	•	•	•	•	•	•	•	•	•	•	•	•	•	•	•	•	•	•	•	26
Sprint																	•	•	•	•	•						5
Team																			•	•	•	•	•	•	•	•	8
Mass start																						•	•	•	•	•	5

== Medalists ==
=== Men's ===
==== Individual Gundersen ====
Year	Gold	Silver	Bronze
1960	(Czechoslovakia) Jaromír Nevlud	(Soviet Union) Albert Larionov	(Soviet Union) Yuriy Krestov
1962	(Soviet Union) Vjatscheslav Drjagin	(Soviet Union) Albert Larionov	(Japan) Yōsuke Etō
1964	(Soviet Union) Vjatscheslav Drjagin	(Czechoslovakia) Stefan Oleksak	(Japan) Takashi Fujisawa
1966	(Czechoslovakia) Yuriy Simonov	(Soviet Union) Vjatscheslav Drjagin	(Japan) Takashi Fujisawa
1968	(Japan) Hiroshi Itagaki	(Japan) Masatoshi Sudo	(Czechoslovakia) Antonin Kucera
1970	(Soviet Union) Nikolay Nogovitsyn	(Soviet Union) Yuri Kozulin	(Soviet Union) Vladimir Rusinov
1972	(Soviet Union) Vladimir Rusinov	(Japan) Hideki Nakano	(Czechoslovakia) Ladislav Rygl
1975	not included in the program		
1978	(Soviet Union) Leonid Chashchin	(Soviet Union) Sergey Matveyev	(Finland) Kari Helppikangas
1981	not included in the program		
1983	(Czechoslovakia) Vladimir Frak	(Soviet Union) Viktor Apulov	(Soviet Union) Aleksander Pektubayev
1985	(West Germany) Thomas Müller	(Soviet Union) Alexander Prosvirnin	(Japan) Hiroki Uchida
1987	(Czechoslovakia) Jan Klimko	(Japan) Kazuoki Kodama	(Czechoslovakia) František Řepka
1989	(Japan) Kenji Ogiwara	(Japan) Takanori Kōno	(Soviet Union) Sergey Zaviyalov
1991	(Japan) Kenji Ogiwara	(Japan) Takanori Kōno	(Japan) Nobuhiko Murai
1993	(Japan) Junichi Kogawa	(Poland) Stanisław Ustupski	(Japan) Kazuyoshi Fujiwara
1995	(Belarus) Sergey Zakharenko	(Japan) Kazuyoshi Yomada	(Japan) Futoshi Otake
1997	(Japan) Koji Takasawa	(Belarus) Dmitriy Seleznev	(Belarus) Sergey Zakharenko
1999	(Japan) Eiji Masaki	(Belarus) Sergey Zakharenko	(Slovakia) Martin Novorolnik
2001	(Slovenia) Grega Verbajs	(Japan) Jun Sato	(Czech Republic) Vladimir Smid
2003	(Japan) Norihito Kobayashi	(Japan) Junpei Aoki	(Czech Republic) Tomáš Slavík
2005	(Germany) Georg Hettich	(Austria) Bernhard Gruber	(Switzerland) Pascal Meinherz
2007	(Czech Republic) Tomáš Slavík	(Japan) Yūsuke Minato	(Russia) Konstantin Voronin
2009	(Germany) Steffen Tepel	(Japan) Chota Hatakeyama	(Austria) Benjamin Kreiner
2011	(Switzerland) Tommy Schmid	(Germany) Steffen Tepel	(Russia) Ivan Panin
2013	(Poland) Adam Cieślar	(Germany) Johannes Wasel	(Japan) Aguri Shimizu
2015	(Poland) Adam Cieślar	(Germany) David Welde	(Poland) Szczepan Kupczak
2017	(Russia) Viacheslav Barkov	(Poland) Adam Cieślar	(Poland) Paweł Słowiok
2019	not included in the program		
2023	(Japan) Kobayashi Sakutaro	(United States) Niklas Malacinski	(Finland) Rasmus Ähtävä

==== Sprint ====
Year	Gold	Silver	Bronze
1960-1997	not included in the program		
1999	(Japan) Eiji Masaki	(Japan) Takashi Kitamura	(Slovakia) Martin Novorolnik
2001	(Japan) Makoto Masaki	(Slovenia) Grega Verbajs	(Japan) Jun Sato
2003	(Japan) Norihito Kobayashi	(Japan) Junpei Aoki	(Slovenia) Marko Simic
2005	(Austria) Bernhard Gruber	(Russia) Sergueï Maslennikov	(Switzerland) Jan Schmid
2007	(Japan) Yūsuke Minato	(Germany) Jens Kaufmann	(Czech Republic) Tomáš Slavík
2009-2023	not included in the program		

==== Mass start ====
Year	Gold	Silver	Bronze
1960-2007	not included in the program		
2009	(Japan) Koichiro Sato	(Japan) Takehiro Nagai	(Czech Republic) Petr Kutal
2011	(Japan) Aguri Shimizu	(Poland) Tomasz Pochwała	(Switzerland) Tommy Schmid
2013	(Japan) Aguri Shimizu	(Poland) Adam Cieślar	(Poland) Paweł Słowiok
2015	(Poland) Adam Cieślar	(Germany) David Welde	(Poland) Mateusz Wantulok
2017	(Poland) Adam Cieślar	(Germany) Tobias Simon	(Japan) Go Sonehara
2019	not included in the program		

==== Relays ====
Year	Gold	Silver	Bronze
1960-2001	not included in the program		
2003	Japan; Yosuke Hatakeyama; Junpei Aoki; Norihito Kobayashi	Slovenia; Grega Verbajs; Damjan Vtič; Marko Simic	Finland; Antti Joutjärvi; Tommi Räisänen; Tommy Hyry
2005	Russia; Konstantin Voronin; Ivan Fesenko; Sergueï Maslennikov	Japan; Tomoyuki Usui; Yūsuke Minato; Kousuke Tanaka	Slovenia; Mitja Oranič; Anze Obreza; Dejan Plevnik
2007	Russia; Konstantin Voronin; Ivan Fesenko; Sergueï Maslennikov	Slovenia; Rok Zima; Rok Rozman; Mitja Oranič	Japan; Takashi Moriyama; Kohei Takao; Yūsuke Minato
2009	Japan; Takehiro Nagai; Naoki Kaede; Chota Hatakeyama	Germany; Jens Kaufmann; Florian Schillinger; Steffen Tepel	Russia; Michail Barinov; Aleksandr Nikiforov; Pavel Bazarov
2011	Russia; Konstantin Voronin; Michail Barinov; Ivan Panin	Poland; Andrzej Zarycki; Mateusz Wantulok; Tomasz Pochwała	Russia II; Denis Isaikin; Damir Khinsertdinov; Niyaz Nabeev
2013	Poland; Szczepan Kupczak; Paweł Słowiok; Adam Cieślar	Slovenia; Borut Mavc; Jože Kamenik; Matič Plaznik	Japan; Go Yamamoto; Shota Horigome; Aguri Shimizu
2015	Germany; Johannes Wasel; Tobias Simon; David Welde	Japan; Go Yamamoto; Takehiro Watanabe; Aguri Shimizu	Russia; Samir Mastiev; Niyaz Nabeev; Ernest Yahin
2017	Poland; Wojciech Marusarz; Paweł Słowiok; Adam Cieślar	Russia; Timofey Borisov; Samir Mastiev; Viacheslav Barkov	Japan; Shota Horigome; Go Yamamoto; Go Sonehara
2019	not included in the program		
2023	United States; Evan Nichols; Niklas Malacinski	Japan; Takuya Nakazawa; Sakutaro Kobayashi	Ukraine; Dmytro Mazurchuk; Vitalii Hrebeniuk

=== Women ===
==== Individual normal hill/5 km ====
Year	Gold	Silver	Bronze
2005–2019	not included in the program		
2023	(Japan) Haruka Kasai	(Japan) Yuna Kasai	(Japan) Ayane Miyazaki

==== Individual mass start 5 km/normal hill ====
Year	Gold	Silver	Bronze
2005–2019	not included in the program		
2023	(Japan) Yuna Kasai	(Japan) Haruka Kasai	(Poland) Joanna Kil

=== Mixed event ===
Year	Gold	Silver	Bronze
2005–2019	not included in the program		
2023	Japan I	Poland I	United States I

== Medal table ==
Last updated after the 2023 Winter World University Games

Rank	Nation	Gold	Silver	Bronze	Total
1	Japan (JPN)	21	18	12	51
2	Poland (POL)	6	6	6	18
3	Soviet Union (URS)	5	7	4	16
4	Russia (RUS)	4	2	5	11
5	Czechoslovakia (TCH)	4	1	4	9
6	Germany (GER)	3	7	0	10
7	Slovenia (SLO)	1	4	2	7
8	United States (USA)	1	2	2	5
9	Belarus (BLR)	1	2	1	4
10	Austria (AUT)	1	1	1	3
11	Czech Republic (CZE)	1	0	4	5
12	Switzerland (SUI)	1	0	3	4
13	West Germany (FRG)	1	0	0	1
14	Finland (FIN)	0	0	4	4
15	Slovakia (SVK)	0	0	2	2
16	Ukraine (UKR)	0	0	1	1
Totals (16 entries)		50	50	51	151
