= Nordic combined at the 2018 Winter Olympics – Individual large hill/10 km =

Men's individual large hill/10 km at the XXIII Olympic Winter Games
- Pictogram for Nordic combined
- Venue: Alpensia Ski Jumping Centre (ski jumping); Alpensia Cross-Country Skiing Centre (cross-country skiing)
- Dates: 20 February 2018
- Competitors: 48 from 16 nations
- Winning time: 23:52.5

Medalists
| 1st place, gold medalist(s) | | Johannes Rydzek | Germany |
| 2nd place, silver medalist(s) | | Fabian Rießle | Germany |
| 3rd place, bronze medalist(s) | | Eric Frenzel | Germany |

The men's individual large hill/10 km Nordic combined competition for the 2018 Winter Olympics in Pyeongchang, South Korea, was held on 20 February 2018 at the Alpensia Ski Jumping Centre and Alpensia Cross-Country Skiing Centre on 20 February. The defending champion was Jørgen Graabak. The event was won by Johannes Rydzek. Fabian Rießle, the 2014 bronze medalist, won the silver medal. Eric Frenzel got bronze, completing the German sweep of the podium.

The ski jumping winner, Akito Watabe, and the seventh place, Eero Hirvonen, were separated at the start of the cross-country skiing race by 40 seconds. They soon after the start formed a group and skied together, well ahead of the rest of the field. Wilhelm Denifl dropped out of this group, but the rest went together until the finish. There, the German trio finished ahead of Jarl Magnus Riiber, Watabe, and Hirvonen.

== Qualification ==
Using the Olympic Quota Allocation List and Continental Cup Standings, when no athletes remain in the allocation list (which includes results from July 1, 2016 to January 21, 2018), the top 50 athletes were awarded quotas (with maximum of five per country). Only maximum of four could be entered into this event. The remaining five quotas were given to countries with three athletes to make a team. If a minimum of ten teams were already formed in the first 50, then the remaining five quotas would be allocated using the allocation list or continental cup standings.

== Results ==
=== Ski jumping ===
The ski jumping was held at 19:00.

| Rank | Bib | Name | Country | Distance (m) | Points | Deficit |
|---|---|---|---|---|---|---|
| 1 | 48 | Akito Watabe | Japan | 134.0 | 138.9 | — |
| 2 | 40 | Jarl Magnus Riiber | Norway | 139.0 | 138.6 | +0:01 |
| 3 | 36 | Wilhelm Denifl | Austria | 137.5 | 135.0 | +0:16 |
| 4 | 41 | Eric Frenzel | Germany | 136.5 | 132.9 | +0:24 |
| 5 | 44 | Johannes Rydzek | Germany | 133.5 | 131.2 | +0:31 |
| 6 | 45 | Fabian Rießle | Germany | 130.5 | 130.3 | +0:34 |
| 7 | 42 | Eero Hirvonen | Finland | 132.5 | 127.9 | +0:44 |
| 8 | 27 | Go Yamamoto | Japan | 127.5 | 124.5 | +0:58 |
| 9 | 38 | Vinzenz Geiger | Germany | 129.0 | 124.0 | +1:00 |
| 10 | 39 | Lukas Klapfer | Austria | 131.0 | 123.0 | +1:04 |
| 11 | 33 | Maxime Laheurte | France | 128.5 | 122.6 | +1:05 |
| 12 | 18 | Szczepan Kupczak | Poland | 129.0 | 122.1 | +1:07 |
| 13 | 22 | Hideaki Nagai | Japan | 134.0 | 121.0 | +1:12 |
| 14 | 35 | Mario Seidl | Austria | 127.0 | 116.5 | +1:30 |
| 15 | 21 | Ernest Yahin | Olympic Athletes from Russia | 127.5 | 114.1 | +1:39 |
| 16 | 34 | Kristjan Ilves | Estonia | 123.5 | 114.0 | +1:40 |
| 17 | 32 | François Braud | France | 121.0 | 112.6 | +1:45 |
| 18 | 29 | Tomáš Portyk | Czech Republic | 120.5 | 111.5 | +1:50 |
| 19 | 46 | Jørgen Graabak | Norway | 119.5 | 110.9 | +1:52 |
| 20 | 28 | Yoshito Watabe | Japan | 121.0 | 110.6 | +1:53 |
| 21 | 15 | Viktor Pasichnyk | Ukraine | 126.0 | 108.2 | +2:03 |
| 22 | 47 | Jan Schmid | Norway | 119.0 | 107.9 | +2:04 |
| 23 | 26 | Bryan Fletcher | United States | 120.5 | 107.8 | +2:04 |
| 24 | 12 | Ben Berend | United States | 124.0 | 105.8 | +2:12 |
| 25 | 43 | Espen Andersen | Norway | 121.0 | 105.6 | +2:13 |
| 26 | 3 | Ondřej Pažout | Czech Republic | 124.5 | 105.2 | +2:15 |
| 27 | 24 | Tim Hug | Switzerland | 117.5 | 104.6 | +2:17 |
| 28 | 37 | Ilkka Herola | Finland | 119.5 | 103.6 | +2:21 |
| 29 | 17 | Miroslav Dvořák | Czech Republic | 119.5 | 99.9 | +2:36 |
| 30 | 23 | Bernhard Gruber | Austria | 133.5 | 98.5 | +2:42 |
| 31 | 14 | Jason Lamy-Chappuis | France | 118.5 | 94.9 | +2:56 |
| 32 | 16 | Paweł Słowiok | Poland | 119.5 | 93.2 | +3:03 |
| 33 | 8 | Adam Cieślar | Poland | 119.0 | 89.8 | +3:16 |
| 34 | 11 | Karl-August Tiirmaa | Estonia | 116.0 | 89.3 | +3:18 |
| 35 | 10 | Raffaele Buzzi | Italy | 117.5 | 87.9 | +3:24 |
| 36 | 31 | Antoine Gérard | France | 108.0 | 85.5 | +3:34 |
| 37 | 20 | Marjan Jelenko | Slovenia | 109.0 | 84.4 | +3:38 |
| 38 | 13 | Vid Vrhovnik | Slovenia | 112.5 | 83.4 | +3:42 |
| 39 | 5 | Wojciech Marusarz | Poland | 114.0 | 82.3 | +3:46 |
| 40 | 30 | Alessandro Pittin | Italy | 109.0 | 82.2 | +3:47 |
| 41 | 19 | Leevi Mutru | Finland | 111.0 | 81.9 | +3:48 |
| 42 | 25 | Arttu Mäkiaho | Finland | 108.0 | 81.7 | +3:49 |
| 43 | 2 | Ben Loomis | United States | 114.5 | 81.6 | +3:49 |
| 44 | 7 | Lukáš Daněk | Czech Republic | 114.0 | 78.7 | +4:01 |
| 45 | 1 | Lukas Runggaldier | Italy | 110.0 | 77.9 | +4:04 |
| 46 | 4 | Jasper Good | United States | 109.5 | 72.7 | +4:25 |
| 47 | 9 | Aaron Kostner | Italy | 105.5 | 71.2 | +4:31 |
| 48 | 6 | Park Je-un | South Korea | 104.5 | 60.4 | +5:14 |

=== Cross-country ===
The cross-country part was held at 21:45.

| Rank | Bib | Name | Country | Start time | Cross-country time | Cross-country rank | Finish time | Deficit |
|---|---|---|---|---|---|---|---|---|
| 1st place, gold medalist(s) | 5 | Johannes Rydzek | Germany | 0:31 | 23:21.5 | 4 | 23:52.5 | — |
| 2nd place, silver medalist(s) | 6 | Fabian Rießle | Germany | 0:34 | 23:18.9 | 3 | 23:52.9 | +0.4 |
| 3rd place, bronze medalist(s) | 4 | Eric Frenzel | Germany | 0:24 | 23:29.3 | 7 | 23:53.3 | +0.8 |
| 4 | 2 | Jarl Magnus Riiber | Norway | 0:01 | 23:54.3 | 17 | 23:55.3 | +2.8 |
| 5 | 1 | Akito Watabe | Japan | 0:00 | 24:05.0 | 20 | 24:05.0 | +12.5 |
| 6 | 7 | Eero Hirvonen | Finland | 0:44 | 23:30.6 | 9 | 24:14.6 | +22.1 |
| 7 | 9 | Vinzenz Geiger | Germany | 1:00 | 23:42.6 | 13 | 24:42.6 | +50.1 |
| 8 | 3 | Wilhelm Denifl | Austria | 0:16 | 24:38.6 | 34 | 24:54.6 | +1:02.1 |
| 9 | 10 | Lukas Klapfer | Austria | 1:04 | 24:11.3 | 23 | 25:15.3 | +1:22.8 |
| 10 | 19 | Jørgen Graabak | Norway | 1:52 | 23:25.3 | 6 | 25:17.3 | +1:24.8 |
| 11 | 22 | Jan Schmid | Norway | 2:04 | 23:15.7 | 2 | 25:19.7 | +1:27.2 |
| 12 | 13 | Hideaki Nagai | Japan | 1:12 | 24:08.2 | 22 | 25:20.2 | +1:27.7 |
| 13 | 14 | Mario Seidl | Austria | 1:30 | 23:51.0 | 16 | 25:21.0 | +1:28.5 |
| 14 | 11 | Maxime Laheurte | France | 1:05 | 24:17.8 | 27 | 25:22.8 | +1:30.3 |
| 15 | 17 | François Braud | France | 1:45 | 23:39.6 | 12 | 25:24.6 | +1:32.1 |
| 16 | 8 | Go Yamamoto | Japan | 0:58 | 24:34.2 | 32 | 25:32.2 | +1:39.7 |
| 17 | 23 | Bryan Fletcher | United States | 2:04 | 23:31.4 | 10 | 25:35.4 | +1:42.9 |
| 18 | 28 | Ilkka Herola | Finland | 2:21 | 23:25.2 | 5 | 25:46.2 | +1:53.7 |
| 19 | 18 | Tomáš Portyk | Czech Republic | 1:50 | 24:04.9 | 19 | 25:54.9 | +2:02.4 |
| 20 | 20 | Yoshito Watabe | Japan | 1:53 | 24:14.9 | 26 | 26:07.9 | +2:15.4 |
| 21 | 30 | Bernhard Gruber | Austria | 2:42 | 23:46.3 | 14 | 26:28.3 | +2:35.8 |
| 22 | 25 | Espen Andersen | Norway | 2:13 | 24:23.8 | 31 | 26:36.8 | +2:44.3 |
| 23 | 21 | Viktor Pasichnyk | Ukraine | 2:03 | 24:36.6 | 33 | 26:39.6 | +2:47.1 |
| 24 | 27 | Tim Hug | Switzerland | 2:17 | 24:23.5 | 30 | 26:40.5 | +2:48.0 |
| 25 | 12 | Szczepan Kupczak | Poland | 1:07 | 25:34.3 | 42 | 26:41.3 | +2:48.8 |
| 26 | 29 | Miroslav Dvořák | Czech Republic | 2:36 | 24:23.3 | 29 | 26:59.3 | +3:06.8 |
| 27 | 40 | Alessandro Pittin | Italy | 3:47 | 23:13.9 | 1 | 27:00.9 | +3:08.4 |
| 28 | 16 | Kristjan Ilves | Estonia | 1:40 | 25:28.3 | 40 | 27:08.3 | +3:15.8 |
| 29 | 32 | Paweł Słowiok | Poland | 3:03 | 24:13.3 | 25 | 27:16.3 | +3:23.8 |
| 30 | 31 | Jason Lamy-Chappuis | France | 2:56 | 24:21.5 | 28 | 27:17.5 | +3:25.0 |
| 31 | 41 | Leevi Mutru | Finland | 3:48 | 23:30.3 | 8 | 27:18.3 | +3:25.8 |
| 32 | 36 | Antoine Gérard | France | 3:34 | 23:46.3 | 14 | 27:20.3 | +3:27.8 |
| 33 | 33 | Adam Cieślar | Poland | 3:16 | 24:07.4 | 21 | 27:23.4 | +3:30.9 |
| 34 | 35 | Raffaele Buzzi | Italy | 3:24 | 24:02.5 | 18 | 27:26.5 | +3:34.0 |
| 35 | 15 | Ernest Yahin | Olympic Athletes from Russia | 1:39 | 25:56.1 | 43 | 27:35.1 | +3:42.6 |
| 36 | 45 | Lukas Runggaldier | Italy | 4:04 | 23:32.7 | 11 | 27:36.7 | +3:44.2 |
| 37 | 26 | Ondřej Pažout | Czech Republic | 2:15 | 25:32.4 | 41 | 27:47.4 | +3:54.9 |
| 38 | 42 | Arttu Mäkiaho | Finland | 3:49 | 24:12.3 | 24 | 28:01.3 | +4:08.8 |
| 39 | 24 | Ben Berend | United States | 2:12 | 26:08.7 | 44 | 28:20.7 | +4:28.2 |
| 40 | 43 | Ben Loomis | United States | 3:49 | 24:42.3 | 35 | 28:31.3 | +4:38.8 |
| 41 | 37 | Marjan Jelenko | Slovenia | 3:38 | 24:57.7 | 36 | 28:35.7 | +4:43.2 |
| 42 | 38 | Vid Vrhovnik | Slovenia | 3:42 | 25:08.4 | 37 | 28:50.4 | +4:57.9 |
| 43 | 46 | Jasper Good | United States | 4:25 | 25:17.7 | 39 | 29:42.7 | +5:50.2 |
| 44 | 47 | Aaron Kostner | Italy | 4:31 | 25:17.5 | 38 | 29:48.5 | +5:56.0 |
| 45 | 34 | Karl-August Tiirmaa | Estonia | 3:18 | 26:44.0 | 47 | 30:02.0 | +6:09.5 |
| 46 | 44 | Lukáš Daněk | Czech Republic | 4:01 | 26:36.1 | 46 | 30:37.1 | +6:44.6 |
| 47 | 48 | Park Je-un | South Korea | 5:14 | 26:14.8 | 45 | 31:28.8 | +7:36.3 |
| | 39 | Wojciech Marusarz | Poland | 3:46 | DNF | | | |
