= 2018–19 FIS Nordic Combined World Cup =

International skiing competition

Nordic Combined World Cup 2018/19
Winners
- Overall: (Norway) Jarl Magnus Riiber
- Lillehammer Tour: (Norway) Jarl Magnus Riiber
- Triple: (Austria) Mario Seidl
- Best Jumper Trophy: (Austria) Franz-Josef Rehrl
- Best Skier Trophy: (Italy) Alessandro Pittin
- Men's team: Norway
- Nations Cup: Norway

Competitions
- Venues: 11
- Individual: 21
- Team: 3

The 2018/19 FIS Nordic Combined World Cup was the 36th World Cup season, organized by the International Ski Federation. It started on 24 November 2018 in Ruka, Finland and concluded on 17 March 2019 in Schonach, Germany.

== Calendar ==
=== Men ===
Num	Season	Date	Place	Hill	Discipline	Winner	Second	Third	Yellow bib	Ref.
506	1	24 November 2018	(Finland) Ruka	Rukatunturi	HS142 / 10 km	(Austria) Mario Seidl	(Norway) Jarl Magnus Riiber	(Germany) Johannes Rydzek	(Austria) Mario Seidl	
507	2	30 November 2018	(Norway) Lillehammer	Lysgårdsbakken	HS98 / 5 km	(Norway) Jarl Magnus Riiber	(Germany) Eric Frenzel	(Austria) Franz-Josef Rehrl	(Norway) Jarl Magnus Riiber	
508	3	1 December 2018	(Norway) Lillehammer	Lysgårdsbakken	10 km / HS98	(Norway) Jarl Magnus Riiber	(Germany) Eric Frenzel	(Germany) Fabian Rießle	(Norway) Jarl Magnus Riiber	
509	4	2 December 2018	(Norway) Lillehammer	Lysgårdsbakken	HS140 / 10 km	(Norway) Jarl Magnus Riiber	(Norway) Jørgen Graabak	(Germany) Johannes Rydzek	(Norway) Jarl Magnus Riiber	
1st Lillehammer Tour (30 November – 2 December 2018)						(Norway) Jarl Magnus Riiber	(Germany) Eric Frenzel	(Norway) Jørgen Graabak		
510	5	22 December 2018	(Austria) Ramsau	W90-Mattensprunganlage	HS98 / 10 km	(Norway) Jarl Magnus Riiber	(Austria) Franz-Josef Rehrl	(Germany) Fabian Rießle	(Norway) Jarl Magnus Riiber	
511	6	23 December 2018	(Austria) Ramsau	W90-Mattensprunganlage	HS98 / 10 km	(Norway) Jørgen Graabak	(Germany) Johannes Rydzek	(Germany) Fabian Rießle	(Norway) Jarl Magnus Riiber	
512	7	5 January 2019	(Estonia) Otepää	Tehvandi	HS100 / 10 km	(Norway) Jarl Magnus Riiber	(Japan) Akito Watabe	(Austria) Martin Fritz	(Norway) Jarl Magnus Riiber	
513	8	6 January 2019	(Estonia) Otepää	Tehvandi	HS100 / 10 km	(Norway) Jarl Magnus Riiber	(Germany) Johannes Rydzek	(Japan) Akito Watabe	(Norway) Jarl Magnus Riiber	
514	9	11 January 2019	(Italy) Val di Fiemme	Trampolino dal Ben	HS135 / 10 km	(Germany) Johannes Rydzek	(Norway) Jørgen Graabak	(Austria) Mario Seidl	(Norway) Jarl Magnus Riiber	
515	10	13 January 2019	(Italy) Val di Fiemme	Trampolino dal Ben	HS135 / 10 km	(Germany) Vinzenz Geiger	(Germany) Johannes Rydzek	(Japan) Akito Watabe	(Norway) Jarl Magnus Riiber	
516	11	18 January 2019	(France) Chaux-Neuve	La Côté Feuillée	HS118 / 5 km	(Austria) Franz-Josef Rehrl	(Norway) Espen Bjørnstad	(Germany) Fabian Rießle	(Norway) Jarl Magnus Riiber	
517	12	19 January 2019	(France) Chaux-Neuve	La Côté Feuillée	HS118 / 10 km	(Austria) Franz-Josef Rehrl	(Japan) Akito Watabe	(Germany) Fabian Rießle	(Norway) Jarl Magnus Riiber	
518	13	20 January 2019	(France) Chaux-Neuve	La Côté Feuillée	HS118 / 15 km	(Austria) Mario Seidl	(Germany) Fabian Rießle	(Austria) Franz-Josef Rehrl	(Norway) Jarl Magnus Riiber	
6th Nordic Combined Triple (18–20 January 2019)
519	14	26 January 2019	(Norway) Trondheim	Granåsen	HS140 / 10 km	(Norway) Jarl Magnus Riiber	(Norway) Magnus Krog	(Austria) Wilhelm Denifl	(Norway) Jarl Magnus Riiber	
520	15	27 January 2019	(Norway) Trondheim	Granåsen	HS140 / 10 km	(Norway) Jarl Magnus Riiber	(Germany) Vinzenz Geiger	(Norway) Jørgen Graabak	(Norway) Jarl Magnus Riiber	
521	16	2 February 2019	(Germany) Klingenthal	Vogtland Arena	HS140 / 10 km	(Norway) Jarl Magnus Riiber	(Germany) Vinzenz Geiger	(Germany) Johannes Rydzek	(Norway) Jarl Magnus Riiber	
522	17	3 February 2019	(Germany) Klingenthal	Vogtland Arena	HS140 / 10 km	(Norway) Jarl Magnus Riiber	(Finland) Ilkka Herola	(Germany) Fabian Rießle	(Norway) Jarl Magnus Riiber	
523	18	10 February 2019	(Finland) Lahti	Salpausselkä	HS130 / 10 km	(Norway) Jørgen Graabak	(Japan) Akito Watabe	(Austria) Mario Seidl	(Norway) Jarl Magnus Riiber	
FIS Nordic World Ski Championships 2019 (20 February – 3 March)
524	19	9 March 2019	(Norway) Oslo	Holmenkollbakken	HS134 / 10 km	(Norway) Jarl Magnus Riiber	(Finland) Ilkka Herola	(Norway) Espen Bjørnstad	(Norway) Jarl Magnus Riiber	
525	20	16 March 2019	(Germany) Schonach	Langenwaldschanze	HS106 / 10 km	(Austria) Bernhard Gruber	(Austria) Lukas Greiderer	(Norway) Jarl Magnus Riiber	(Norway) Jarl Magnus Riiber	
526	21	17 March 2019	(Germany) Schonach	Langenwaldschanze	HS106 / 10 km	(Norway) Jarl Magnus Riiber	(Norway) Jan Schmid	(Austria) Bernhard Gruber	(Norway) Jarl Magnus Riiber	

=== Men's team ===
Num	Season	Date	Place	Hill	Discipline	Winner	Second	Third	Yellow bib	Ref.
41	1	25 November 2018	(Finland) Ruka	Rukatunturi	HS142 / 4x5 km Relay	Germany Eric Frenzel; Johannes Rydzek; Vinzenz Geiger; Fabian Rießle	Japan Gō Yamamoto; Yoshito Watabe; Hideaki Nagai; Akito Watabe	Norway Jan Schmid; Espen Andersen; Jarl Magnus Riiber; Jørgen Graabak	Germany	
42	2	12 January 2019	(Italy) Val di Fiemme	Trampolino dal Ben	HS135 / 2x7.5 km Sprint	Norway I Jan Schmid; Jørgen Graabak	Germany I Fabian Rießle; Johannes Rydzek	Germany II Eric Frenzel; Vinzenz Geiger	Germany	
43	3	9 February 2019	(Finland) Lahti	Salpausselkä	HS130 / 2x7.5 km Sprint	Finland I Eero Hirvonen; Ilkka Herola	Norway I Espen Bjørnstad; Jørgen Graabak	Austria I Wilhelm Denifl; Mario Seidl	Norway	

== Standings ==
=== Overall ===
Rank	after all 21 events	Points
1	(Norway) Jarl Magnus Riiber	1518
2	(Japan) Akito Watabe	893
3	(Austria) Franz-Josef Rehrl	841
4	(Germany) Johannes Rydzek	806
5	(Germany) Vinzenz Geiger	803
6	(Austria) Mario Seidl	729
7	(Norway) Jørgen Graabak	707
8	(Germany) Fabian Rießle	693
9	(Norway) Espen Bjørnstad	596
10	(Germany) Manuel Faißt	485

=== Best Jumper Trophy ===
Rank	after all 21 events	Points
1	(Austria) Franz-Josef Rehrl	1260
2	(Norway) Jarl Magnus Riiber	1135
3	(Austria) Mario Seidl	844
4	(Japan) Yoshito Watabe	814
5	(Norway) Espen Bjørnstad	750
6	(Poland) Szczepan Kupczak	713
7	(Japan) Akito Watabe	697
8	(Germany) Manuel Faißt	635
9	(Japan) Gō Yamamoto	583
10	(Germany) Terence Weber	538

=== Best Skier Trophy ===
Rank	after all 21 events	Points
1	(Italy) Alessandro Pittin	1168
2	(Norway) Magnus Krog	1068
3	(Finland) Ilkka Herola	885
4	(Germany) Vinzenz Geiger	797
5	(Germany) Fabian Rießle	765
6	(Finland) Eero Hirvonen	707
7	(Germany) Johannes Rydzek	670
8	(France) Antoine Gerard	590
9	(Austria) Bernhard Gruber	577
10	(Norway) Jørgen Graabak	567

=== Nations Cup ===
Rank	after all 24 events	Points
1	Norway	4937
2	Germany	4117
3	Austria	4060
4	Japan	2063
5	Finland	1196
6	France	743
7	Italy	697
8	Poland	345
9	Czech Republic	291
10	United States	111

=== Prize money ===
Rank	after all 25 payouts	CHF
1	(Norway) Jarl Magnus Riiber	120.900
2	(Norway) Jørgen Graabak	56.710
3	(Germany) Johannes Rydzek	55.097
4	(Germany) Vinzenz Geiger	50.120
5	(Japan) Akito Watabe	48.530
6	(Austria) Mario Seidl	45.784
7	(Germany) Fabian Rießle	45.125
8	(Austria) Franz-Josef Rehrl	44.420
9	(Norway) Espen Bjørnstad	28.961
10	(Germany) Eric Frenzel	28.765

== Achievements ==
First World Cup career victory

- Mario Seidl (AUT), 25, in his 7th season – the WC 1 in Ruka; first podium was 2016–17 in PyeongChang
- Vinzenz Geiger (GER), 21, in his 4th season – the WC 10 in Val di Fiemme; first podium was 2016–17 in Ramsau
- Franz-Josef Rehrl (AUT), 25, in his 7th season – the WC 11 in Chaux-Neuve; first podium was the WC2 in Lillehammer

First World Cup podium

- Franz-Josef Rehrl (AUT), 25, in his 7th season – no. 3 in the WC 2 in Lillehammer
- Martin Fritz (AUT), 24, in his 7th season – no. 3 in the WC 7 in Otepää
- Lukas Greiderer (AUT), 25, in his 7th season – no. 2 in the WC 20 in Schonach

Victories in this World Cup (in brackets victory for all time)

- Jarl Magnus Riiber (NOR), 12 (13) first places
- Jørgen Graabak (NOR), 2 (6) first places
- Franz-Josef Rehrl (AUT), 2 (2) first places
- Mario Seidl (AUT), 2 (2) first places
- Johannes Rydzek (GER), 1 (17) first place
- Bernhard Gruber (AUT), 1 (7) first place
- Vinzenz Geiger (GER), 1 (1) first place

== Retirements ==
Following are notable Nordic combined skiers who announced their retirement:

- François Braud (FRA)
- Wilhelm Denifl (AUT)
- Miroslav Dvořák (CZE)
- Bernhard Flaschberger (AUT)
- Maxime Laheurte (FRA)
- Tom Lubitz (GER)
- Magnus Moan (NOR)
- David Pommer (AUT)
- Paweł Słowiok (POL)
- David Welde (GER)
- Jan Schmid (NOR)
