= Nordic combined at the 2018 Winter Olympics – Individual normal hill/10 km =

Men's individual normal hill/10 km at the XXIII Olympic Winter Games
- Pictogram for Nordic combined
- Venue: Alpensia Ski Jumping Centre (ski jumping); Alpensia Cross-Country Skiing Centre (cross-country skiing)
- Dates: 14 February 2018
- Competitors: 48 from 16 nations

Medalists
1st place, gold medalist(s)		Eric Frenzel	Germany
2nd place, silver medalist(s)		Akito Watabe	Japan
3rd place, bronze medalist(s)		Lukas Klapfer	Austria

The men's individual normal hill/10 km Nordic combined competition for the 2018 Winter Olympics in Pyeongchang, South Korea, was held at the Alpensia Ski Jumping Centre and Alpensia Cross-Country Skiing Centre on 14 February 2018.

== Summary ==
The defending champion was Eric Frenzel; the field also included the 2014 silver medalist Akito Watabe and the 2010 champion Jason Lamy-Chappuis, who was coming out of retirement and was not considered a medal contender. Frenzel became the champion again, with Watabe again taking silver, and Lukas Klapfer becoming the bronze medalist.

After the ski jumping, Franz-Josef Rehrl was leading, with Watabe third and Frenzel fifth. By 4 km of the cross-country skiing part, the top five athletes after the ski jumping, Rehrl, Jarl Magnus Riiber, Frenzel, Lukas Klapfer, and Akito Watabe, were skiing together, with a gap of 15 seconds between them and Eero Hirvonen. The gap was growing. By 5 km Rehrl started lagging behind the rest of the leading group, and by 6.5 km was out of the medal contention. Klapfer was leading the field, with Watabe and Frenzel 0.6 and 1.3 seconds behind, respectively. At the finish, Frenzel was the fastest, with Watabe second five seconds behind. Klapfer and Riiber were left behind, and Klapfer won the bronze medal four seconds ahead of Riiber.

== Qualification ==
Using the Olympic Quota Allocation List and Continental Cup Standings, when no athletes remain in the allocation list (which includes results from July 1, 2016 to January 21, 2018), the top 50 athletes were awarded quotas (with maximum of five per country). Only maximum of four could be entered into this event. The remaining five quotas were given to countries with three athletes to make a team. If a minimum of ten teams were already formed in the first 50, then the remaining five quotas would be allocated using the allocation list or continental cup standings.

== Results ==
=== Ski jumping ===
The ski jumping was held at 15:30.

Rank	Bib	Name	Country	Distance (m)	Points	Time difference
1	27	Franz-Josef Rehrl	Austria	112.0	130.6	–
2	40	Jarl Magnus Riiber	Norway	111.0	126.9	+0:15
3	48	Akito Watabe	Japan	105.5	123.7	+0:28
4	39	Lukas Klapfer	Austria	109.0	122.6	+0:32
5	41	Eric Frenzel	Germany	106.5	121.7	+0:36
6	42	Eero Hirvonen	Finland	102.0	118.0	+0:50
7	43	Espen Andersen	Norway	104.5	117.2	+0:54
8	29	Yoshito Watabe	Japan	104.0	114.3	+1:05
9	35	Kristjan Ilves	Estonia	104.0	112.8	+1:11
10	34	Maxime Laheurte	France	104.5	110.7	+1:20
11	44	Johannes Rydzek	Germany	101.0	109.1	+1:26
12	33	François Braud	France	101.5	108.6	+1:28
13	38	Vinzenz Geiger	Germany	103.5	105.4	+1:41
14	22	Hideaki Nagai	Japan	101.0	104.2	+1:46
15	28	Go Yamamoto	Japan	97.5	104.0	+1:46
16	45	Fabian Rießle	Germany	94.5	99.9	+2:03
17	37	Ilkka Herola	Finland	97.0	99.7	+2:04
18	26	Bryan Fletcher	United States	97.5	99.0	+2:06
19	14	Jason Lamy-Chappuis	France	96.0	97.7	+2:12
20	19	Szczepan Kupczak	Poland	97.0	96.8	+2:15
21	21	Ernest Yahin	Olympic Athletes from Russia	96.0	96.7	+2:16
22	8	Ondřej Pažout	Czech Republic	97.5	95.8	+2:19
23	46	Jørgen Graabak	Norway	90.0	93.6	+2:28
24	32	Antoine Gérard	France	96.5	92.9	+2:31
25	36	Wilhelm Denifl	Austria	92.0	92.3	+2:33
26	24	Tim Hug	Switzerland	97.0	90.9	+2:39
27	13	Vid Vrhovnik	Slovenia	92.5	90.4	+2:41
28	18	Miroslav Dvořák	Czech Republic	95.5	89.3	+2:43
29	30	Tomáš Portyk	Czech Republic	89.5	89.3	+2:45
30	3	Aaron Kostner	Italy	93.5	89.2	+2:46
31	47	Jan Schmid	Norway	88.0	88.8	+2:47
32	16	Paweł Słowiok	Poland	92.5	88.3	+2:49
33	23	Bernhard Gruber	Austria	91.5	88.2	+2:50
34	25	Arttu Mäkiaho	Finland	91.0	85.2	+3:02
34	17	Hannu Manninen	Finland	90.0	85.2	+3:02
36	15	Viktor Pasichnyk	Ukraine	89.5	84.0	+3:06
37	9	Ben Loomis	United States	86.5	79.5	+3:24
38	31	Alessandro Pittin	Italy	89.0	77.4	+3:33
39	10	Taylor Fletcher	United States	86.0	76.4	+3:37
40	11	Raffaele Buzzi	Italy	88.0	74.6	+3:44
41	6	Lukas Runggaldier	Italy	85.0	73.6	+3:48
42	4	Park Je-un	South Korea	86.0	73.3	+3:49
43	12	Karl-August Tiirmaa	Estonia	87.0	68.9	+4:07
44	7	Adam Cieślar	Poland	81.0	68.7	+4:08
45	2	Wojciech Marusarz	Poland	79.5	61.3	+4:37
46	20	Marjan Jelenko	Slovenia	73.5	60.4	+4:41
47	1	Jasper Good	United States	76.0	58.8	+4:47
	5	Lukáš Daněk	Czech Republic	DSQ		

=== Cross-country ===
The cross-country part was held at 18:00.

Rank	Bib	Name	Country	Start time	Cross-country time	Cross-country rank	Finish time	Deficit
1st place, gold medalist(s)	5	Eric Frenzel	Germany	0:36	24:15.4	6	24:51.4	—
2nd place, silver medalist(s)	3	Akito Watabe	Japan	0:28	24:28.2	9	24:56.2	+4.8
3rd place, bronze medalist(s)	4	Lukas Klapfer	Austria	0:32	24:37.5	11	25:09.5	+18.1
4	2	Jarl Magnus Riiber	Norway	0:15	24:58.9	23	25:13.9	+22.5
5	11	Johannes Rydzek	Germany	1:26	23:53.3	3	25:19.3	+27.9
6	6	Eero Hirvonen	Finland	0:50	24:53.0	19	25:43.0	+51.6
7	16	Fabian Rießle	Germany	2:03	23:53.7	4	25:56.7	+1:05.3
8	17	Ilkka Herola	Finland	2:04	23:52.9	2	25:56.9	+1:05.5
9	13	Vinzenz Geiger	Germany	1:41	24:15.9	7	25:56.9	+1:05.5
10	7	Espen Andersen	Norway	0:54	25:11.1	28	26:05.1	+1:13.7
11	10	Maxime Laheurte	France	1:20	24:54.5	21	26:14.5	+1:23.1
12	8	Yoshito Watabe	Japan	1:05	25:11.2	29	26:16.2	+1:24.8
13	1	Franz-Josef Rehrl	Austria	0:00	26:29.5	44	26:29.5	+1:38.1
14	14	Hideaki Nagai	Japan	1:46	24:44.5	16	26:30.5	+1:39.1
15	12	François Braud	France	1:28	25:12.5	30	26:40.5	+1:49.1
16	9	Kristjan Ilves	Estonia	1:11	25:52.3	38	27:03.3	+2:11.9
17	18	Bryan Fletcher	United States	2:06	24:57.6	22	27:03.6	+2:12.2
18	23	Jørgen Graabak	Norway	2:28	24:53.3	20	27:21.3	+2:29.9
19	38	Alessandro Pittin	Italy	3:33	23:48.9	1	27:21.9	+2:30.5
20	33	Bernhard Gruber	Austria	2:50	24:32.1	10	27:22.1	+2:30.7
21	28	Miroslav Dvořák	Czech Republic	2:43	24:40.4	14	27:23.4	+2:32.0
22	32	Paweł Słowiok	Poland	2:49	24:37.6	12	27:26.6	+2:35.2
23	35	Hannu Manninen	Finland	3:02	24:27.8	8	27:29.8	+2:38.4
24	29	Tomáš Portyk	Czech Republic	2:45	24:46.4	17	27:31.4	+2:40.0
25	31	Jan Schmid	Norway	2:47	24:47.8	18	27:34.8	+2:43.4
26	24	Antoine Gérard	France	2:31	25:05.8	26	27:36.8	+2:45.4
27	26	Tim Hug	Switzerland	2:39	24:59.4	25	27:38.4	+2:47.0
28	27	Vid Vrhovnik	Slovenia	2:41	24:58.9	23	27:39.9	+2:48.5
29	25	Wilhelm Denifl	Austria	2:33	25:08.8	27	27:41.8	+2:50.4
30	36	Viktor Pasichnyk	Ukraine	3:06	24:40.1	13	27:46.1	+2:54.7
31	19	Jason Lamy-Chappuis	France	2:12	25:36.9	35	27:48.9	+2:57.5
32	41	Lukas Runggaldier	Italy	3:48	24:03.2	5	27:51.2	+2:59.8
33	15	Go Yamamoto	Japan	1:46	26:11.1	42	27:57.1	+3:05.7
34	22	Ondřej Pažout	Czech Republic	2:19	25:46.8	37	28:05.8	+3:14.4
35	39	Taylor Fletcher	United States	3:37	24:42.2	15	28:19.2	+3:27.8
36	34	Arttu Mäkiaho	Finland	3:02	25:25.3	31	28:27.3	+3:35.9
37	30	Aaron Kostner	Italy	2:46	25:44.4	36	28:30.4	+3:39.0
38	21	Ernest Yahin	Olympic Athletes from Russia	2:16	26:18.3	43	28:34.3	+3:42.9
39	20	Szczepan Kupczak	Poland	2:15	26:47.6	45	29:02.6	+4:11.2
40	40	Raffaele Buzzi	Italy	3:44	25:29.1	33	29:13.1	+4:21.7
41	37	Ben Loomis	United States	3:24	25:56.8	40	29:20.8	+4:29.4
42	44	Adam Cieślar	Poland	4:08	25:30.7	34	29:38.7	+4:47.3
43	43	Karl-August Tiirmaa	Estonia	4:07	25:58.2	41	30:05.2	+5:13.8
44	46	Marjan Jelenko	Slovenia	4:41	25:27.5	32	30:08.5	+5:17.1
45	47	Jasper Good	United States	4:47	25:52.8	39	30:39.8	+5:48.4
46	42	Park Je-un	South Korea	3:49	27:07.5	47	30:56.5	+6:05.1
47	45	Wojciech Marusarz	Poland	4:37	26:50.5	46	31:27.5	+6:36.1
