= Nordic combined at the 2015 Winter Universiade – Individual mass start 10km/normal hill =

The individual mass start competition of the 2015 Winter Universiade was held at the Sporting Centre FIS Štrbské Pleso on January 29. It consisted of a 10 km cross-country race followed by 2 jumps on the normal hill which are not judged.

== Results ==
=== Cross-country ===
Rank	Bib	Athlete	Country	Time	Deficit	Points
1	4	David Welde	Germany	27:20.6	+0.0	120.0
2	3	Adam Cieślar	Poland	27:59.9	+39.3	111.0
3	5	Samir Mastiev	Russia	28:21.3	+1:00.7	105.0
4	1	Takehiro Watanabe	Japan	28:25.0	+1:04.4	104.0
5	24	Paweł Słowiok	Poland	28:29.0	+1:08.4	103.0
6	22	Go Yamamoto	Japan	28:31.2	+1:10.6	103.0
7	14	Mikke Leinonen	Finland	28:32.6	+1:12.0	102.0
8	8	Viacheslav Barkov	Russia	28:44.6	+1:24.0	99.0
9	13	Viktor Pasichnyk	Ukraine	28:49.2	+1:28.6	98.0
10	25	Aleksei Seregin	Russia	28:54.7	+1:34.1	97.0
11	18	Johannes Wasel	Germany	28:55.7	+1:35.1	97.0
12	2	Ernest Yahin	Russia	28:57.0	+1:36.4	96.0
13	20	Aguri Shimizu	Japan	29:04.5	+1:43.9	94.0
14	21	Ruslan Balanda	Ukraine	29:08.1	+1:47.5	93.0
15	11	Petr Kutal	Czech Republic	29:28.0	+2:07.4	89.0
16	27	Mateusz Wantulok	Poland	29:37.4	+2:16.8	86.0
17	16	Wojciech Marusarz	Poland	29:57.7	+2:37.1	81.0
18	26	Go Sonehara	Japan	30:05.3	+2:44.7	79.0
19	9	Eetu Vähäsöyrinki	Finland	30:13.8	+2:53.2	77.0
20	19	Martin Zeman	Czech Republic	30:14.4	+2:53.8	77.0
21	15	Park Je-un	South Korea	30:21.5	+3:00.9	75.0
22	7	Niyaz Nabeev	Russia	30:24.1	+3:03.5	74.0
23	12	Oleh Vilivchuk	Ukraine	32:31.8	+5:11.2	43.0
24	10	Evgeni Klimov	Russia	33:27.1	+6:06.5	29.0
25	17	Raiko Heide	Estonia	36:25.3	+9:04.7	-16.0
	6	Tobias Simon	Germany	DNF		
	23	Szczepan Kupczak	Poland	DNF		

=== Ski jumping ===
Rank	Bib	Athlete	Country	Cross-Country Points	Round 1 Distance (m)	Round 1 Points	Round 1 Rank	Round 2 Distance (m)	Round 2 Points	Round 1 Rank	Total Points
1st place, gold medalist(s)	24	Adam Cieślar	Poland	110.2	89.5	53.4	4	88.5	53.3	7	216.9
2nd place, silver medalist(s)	25	David Welde	Germany	120.0	77.0	36.9	17	87.0	53.4	6	210.3
3rd place, bronze medalist(s)	10	Mateusz Wantulok	Poland	85.7	91.0	59.8	2	94.0	62.9	2	208.4
4	20	Go Yamamoto	Japan	102.2	86.0	50.8	6	90.0	54.1	4	207.1
5	22	Takehiro Watanabe	Japan	104.0	87.0	48.6	7	89.0	54.1	4	206.7
6	14	Ernest Yahin	Russia	96.0	87.5	52.1	5	84.0	50.7	11	198.8
7	19	Mikke Leinonen	Finland	102.0	82.0	42.3	13	87.0	51.7	9	196.0
8	21	Paweł Słowiok	Poland	103.0	84.0	44.4	10	83.5	43.6	16	191.0
9	17	Viktor Pasichnyk	Ukraine	97.7	79.5	41.5	15	85.0	51.6	10	190.8
10	13	Aguri Shimizu	Japan	94.0	83.0	44.1	11	85.5	50.7	11	188.8
11	4	Niyaz Nabeev	Russia	74.0	89.0	54.7	3	91.5	59.8	3	188.5
12	11	Petr Kutal	Czech Republic	88.2	85.0	46.8	9	86.0	50.1	13	185.1
13	15	Johannes Wasel	Germany	96.2	82.0	41.8	14	83.0	45.4	14	183.4
14	8	Go Sonehara	Japan	78.7	85.5	47.9	8	87.5	53.0	8	179.6
15	23	Samir Mastiev	Russia	104.7	79.5	38.0	16	77.5	34.8	19	177.5
16	2	Evgeni Klimov	Russia	28.2	99.5	73.3	1		74.3	1	175.8
17	18	Viacheslav Barkov	Russia	99.0	79.0	36.5	18	80.0	39.0	17	174.5
18	7	Eetu Vähäsöyrinki	Finland	76.7	82.0	42.6	12	83.5	44.9	15	164.2
19	12	Ruslan Balanda	Ukraine	93.0	74.0	29.9	20	78.0	32.8	20	155.7
20	5	Park Je-un	South Korea	74.7	77.0	31.6	19	82.0	37.5	18	143.8
21	16	Aleksei Seregin	Russia	96.5	70.5	21.0	23	74.5	24.8	23	142.3
22	6	Martin Zeman	Czech Republic	76.5	72.5	24.2	21	73.0	31.0	21	131.7
23	9	Wojciech Marusarz	Poland	80.7	70.0	20.2	24	76.5	30.2	22	131.1
24	3	Oleh Vilivchuk	Ukraine	42.2	69.0	17.6	25	68.5	18.5	25	78.3
25	1	Raiko Heide	Estonia	-16.3	71.0	21.2	22	70.0	23.4	24	28.3
