= Nordic combined at the 2015 Winter Universiade – Individual normal hill/10 km =

The individual normal hill/10 km competition of the 2015 Winter Universiade was held at the Sporting Centre FIS Štrbské Pleso on January 26. It consisted of one jump from the normal hill and a 10 km cross-country race.

== Results ==
=== Ski jumping ===
Rank	Bib	Athlete	Country	Distance (m)	Points	Time difference
1	21	Tobias Simon	Germany	99.0	130.0	+0:00
2	12	Mateusz Wantulok	Poland	98.0	127.1	+0:12
3	24	Adam Cieślar	Poland	95.0	122.0	+0:32
4	1	Szczepan Kupczak	Poland	95.0	119.5	+0:42
5	2	Viktor Pasichnyk	Ukraine	94.0	117.9	+0:48
6	9	Go Yamamoto	Japan	92.5	116.9	+0:52
7	20	Niyaz Nabeev	Russia	92.5	115.1	+1:00
8	10	Petr Kutal	Czech Republic	91.0	112.7	+1:09
9	3	Paweł Słowiok	Poland	92.0	112.1	+1:12
10	13	Mikke Leinonen	Finland	89.5	110.4	+1:18
11	18	Eetu Vähäsöyrinki	Finland	90.0	110.2	+1:19
12	15	Park Je-un	South Korea	90.0	108.5	+1:26
13	23	David Welde	Germany	89.0	107.5	+1:30
14	11	Johannes Wasel	Germany	88.0	105.8	+1:37
15	17	Dmitrii Zharkov	Russia	86.5	101.1	+1:56
16	6	Nikita Oks	Russia	87.0	100.3	+1:59
17	22	Samir Mastiev	Russia	86.0	99.8	+2:01
18	19	Viacheslav Barkov	Russia	84.5	96.8	+2:13
19	8	Martin Zeman	Czech Republic	83.5	93.4	+2:26
20	5	Wojciech Marusarz	Poland	83.5	91.3	+2:35
21	16	Aleksei Seregin	Russia	79.5	86.1	+2:56
22	14	Ruslan Balanda	Ukraine	80.0	86.0	+2:56
23	7	Oleh Vilivchuk	Ukraine	82.0	85.2	+2:59
24	4	Raiko Heide	Estonia	77.5	80.0	+3:20

=== Cross-country ===
Rank	Bib	Athlete	Country	Start time	Cross country time	Cross country rank	Finish time
1st place, gold medalist(s)	3	Adam Cieślar	Poland	0:32	25:46.3	3	26:18.3
2nd place, silver medalist(s)	13	David Welde	Germany	1:30	24:48.3	1	+0.0
3rd place, bronze medalist(s)	4	Szczepan Kupczak	Poland	0:42	26:13.8	6	+37.5
4	5	Viktor Pasichnyk	Ukraine	0:48	26:12.4	5	+42.1
5	2	Mateusz Wantulok	Poland	0:12	27:05.0	13	+58.7
6	10	Mikke Leinonen	Finland	1:18	26:01.9	4	+1:01.6
7	6	Yamamoto Go	Japan	0:52	26:30.2	9	+1:03.8
8	17	Samir Mastiev	Russia	2:01	25:38.4	2	+1:21.1
9	1	Tobias Simon	Germany	0:00	27:46.9	17	+1:28.6
10	14	Johannes Wasel	Germany	1:37	26:26.2	8	+1:44.9
11	11	Eetu Vähäsöyrinki	Finland	1:19	26:45.8	10	+1:45.5
12	18	Viacheslev Barkov	Russia	2:13	26:25.3	7	+2:20.0
13	12	Park Je-un	South Korea	1:26	27:44.9	16	+2:52.6
14	7	Niyaz Nabeev	Russia	1:00	28:18.5	19	+3:00.2
15	19	Martin Zeman	Czech Republic	2:26	26:53.6	11	+3:01.3
16	20	Wojciech Marusarz	Poland	2:35	27:06.2	14	+3:22.9
17	21	Aleksei Seregin	Russia	2:56	26:56.2	12	+3:33.9
18	16	Nikita Oks	Russia	1:59	28:08.3	18	+3:49.0
19	22	Ruslan Balanda	Ukraine	2:56	27:24.8	15	+4:02.5
20	15	Dmitrii Zharkov	Russia	1:56	28:52.9	20	+4:30.6
21	23	Oleh Vilivchuk	Ukraine	2:59	29:35.2	21	+6:15.9
22	24	Heide Raiko	Estonia	3:20	32:54.6	22	+9:56.3
	8	Petr Kutal	Czech Republic	1:09			DNF
	9	Paweł Słowiok	Poland	1:12			DNF
