= Nordic combined at the 2015 Winter Universiade – Team normal hill/3 x 5 km =

The team normal hill/3×5 km competition of the 2015 Winter Universiade was held at the Sporting Centre FIS Štrbské Pleso on January 31. It consisted of three jumps per team from the normal hill and a 3×5 km cross-country races.

== Results ==
=== Ski jumping ===
Rank	Bib	Country	Distance (m)	Points	Time difference
1	7	Poland; Szczepan Kupczak; Adam Cieślar; Mateusz Wantulok	87; 91; 94.5	337; 108.9; 110.3; 117.8	
2	6	Japan; Go Yamamoto; Aguri Shimizu; Takahiro Watanabe	90; 91; 89.5	330.4; 108.9; 113.9; 107.6	+0:09
3	4	Germany; David Welde; Johannes Wasel; Tobias Simon	83; 89; 96	326.2; 95.5; 106.6; 124.1	+0:14
4	5	Russia; Niyaz Nabeev; Samir Mastiev; Ernest Yahin	88.5; 82; 90.5	303.3; 105.2; 90.5; 107.6	+0:45
5	3	Czech Republic; Martin Zeman; Vít Háček; Petr Kutal	80.5; 87; 87	296.5; 91.4; 102.4; 102.7	+0:54
6	2	Ukraine; Oleh Vilivchuk; Ruslan Balanda; Viktor Pasichnyk	76.5; 83; 87	267.8; 76.6; 89.9; 101.3	+1:32
7	1	Mixed Team; Aleksei Seregin; Viacheslav Barkov; Wojciech Marusarz	79; 82.5; DSQ	174.3; 82.5; 91.8; DSQ	+3:37

=== Cross-country ===
Rank	Bib	Country	Deficit	Time	Time difference
1st place, gold medalist(s)	3	Germany; Johannes Wasel; Tobias Simon; David Welde	+0:14	42:33.2; 14:22.6; 14:32.6; 13:38	
2nd place, silver medalist(s)	2	Japan; Go Yamamoto; Aguri Shimizu; Takahiro Watanabe	+0:09	42:43.3; 14:38.8; 14:07.2; 13:57.3	+10.1
3rd place, bronze medalist(s)	4	Russia; Samir Mastiev; Niyaz Nabeev; Ernest Yahin	+0:45	43:01; 14:44; 14:07.5; 14;09.5	+27.8
4	1	Poland; Mateusz Wantulok; Szczepan Kupczak; Adam Cieślar	0.0	43:47.5; 15:12.4; 14:20; 14;15.1	+1:14.3
5	6	Ukraine; Oleh Vilivchuk; Viktor Pasichnyk; Ruslan Balanda	+1:32	46:28.4; 17:43.4; 14;14; 14:31	+3:55.2
6	7	Mixed Team; Aleksei Seregin; Viacheslav Barkov; Wojciech Marusarz	+3:37	46:46.3; 17:58.1; 14:16.1; 14:32.1	+4:13.1
	5	Czech Republic; Petr Kutal; Martin Zeman; Vít Háček	+0:54	DNF; 14;44.3; 14:28.6	
