= FIS Nordic World Ski Championships 2019 – Individual normal hill/10 km =

Individual normal hill/10 km at the FIS Nordic World Ski Championships 2019
- Location: Seefeld in Tirol, Austria
- Dates: 28 February
- Competitors: 61 from 19 nations
- Winning time: 25:01.3

Medalists
gold medal	Jarl Magnus Riiber	Norway
silver medal	Bernhard Gruber	Austria
bronze medal	Akito Watabe	Japan

The Individual normal hill/10 km competition at the FIS Nordic World Ski Championships 2019 was held on 28 February 2019.

== Results ==
=== Ski jumping ===
The ski jumping part was held at 11:00.

Rank	Bib	Name	Country	Distance (m)	Points	Time difference
1	61	Jarl Magnus Riiber	Norway	107.0	135.6	
2	53	Espen Bjørnstad	Norway	105.0	134.1	+0:06
3	58	Franz-Josef Rehrl	Austria	106.5	133.9	+0:07
4	38	Szczepan Kupczak	Poland	104.5	131.3	+0:17
5	39	Samuel Costa	Italy	99.5	130.8	+0:19
6	60	Akito Watabe	Japan	108.5	130.4	+0:21
6	48	Terence Weber	Germany	105.0	130.4	+0:21
8	46	Gō Yamamoto	Japan	102.5	130.2	+0:22
8	43	Bernhard Gruber	Austria	102.0	130.2	+0:22
10	57	Vinzenz Geiger	Germany	104.0	126.9	+0:35
11	56	Mario Seidl	Austria	103.0	125.7	+0:40
12	47	Yoshito Watabe	Japan	103.0	125.5	+0:40
13	1	Alexander Pashaev	Russia	103.0	121.5	+0:56
14	36	Leevi Mutru	Finland	99.0	120.8	+0:59
15	51	Martin Fritz	Austria	99.5	120.7	+1:00
16	49	Jan Schmid	Norway	100.5	117.5	+1:12
17	59	Johannes Rydzek	Germany	100.5	116.6	+1:16
18	54	Fabian Rießle	Germany	100.5	116.4	+1:17
18	32	Ernest Yahin	Russia	98.0	116.4	+1:17
20	29	Paweł Słowiok	Poland	98.0	116.2	+1:18
21	41	Hideaki Nagai	Japan	98.5	115.1	+1:22
22	52	Eric Frenzel	Germany	97.5	114.8	+1:23
22	44	Eero Hirvonen	Finland	99.5	114.8	+1:23
24	50	Ilkka Herola	Finland	101.0	114.6	+1:24
25	22	Ben Loomis	United States	95.5	113.7	+1:28
26	28	Adam Cieślar	Poland	98.5	113.2	+1:30
27	55	Jørgen Gråbak	Norway	101.0	112.8	+1:31
28	42	Antoine Gérard	France	97.5	112.7	+1:32
29	27	Kristjan Ilves	Estonia	97.5	111.7	+1:36
30	16	Dmytro Mazurchuk	Ukraine	98.5	111.5	+1:36
31	25	Aaron Kostner	Italy	94.5	110.1	+1:42
32	21	Jasper Good	United States	93.5	109.5	+1:44
33	40	François Braud	France	93.0	109.1	+1:46
34	34	Maxime Laheurte	France	94.5	108.7	+1:48
35	10	Ondřej Pažout	Czech Republic	96.5	106.8	+1:55
36	26	Vid Vrhovnik	Slovenia	95.0	106.7	+1:56
37	31	Tim Hug	Switzerland	91.0	106.3	+1:57
38	45	Alessandro Pittin	Italy	95.5	105.6	+2:00
39	12	Paweł Twardosz	Poland	90.0	102.8	+2:11
40	37	Tomáš Portyk	Czech Republic	94.0	102.6	+2:12
41	20	Viktor Pasichnyk	Ukraine	90.0	102.4	+2:13
42	30	Laurent Muhlethaler	France	90.0	102.3	+2:13
43	24	Raffaele Buzzi	Italy	92.5	101.1	+2:18
44	23	Jan Vytrval	Czech Republic	90.5	100.7	+2:20
45	35	Arttu Mäkiaho	Finland	90.5	99.0	+2:26
46	8	Park Je-un	South Korea	95.0	97.7	+2:32
47	3	Lukáš Daněk	Czech Republic	90.0	96.6	+2:36
48	5	Jared Shumate	United States	96.0	94.2	+2:46
49	33	Taylor Fletcher	United States	90.5	93.6	+2:48
50	11	Viacheslav Barkov	Russia	91.5	93.2	+2:50
51	13	Chingiz Rakparov	Kazakhstan	89.5	90.5	+3:00
52	6	Ožbej Jelen	Slovenia	91.5	90.4	+3:01
53	4	Eldar Orussayev	Kazakhstan	87.0	87.1	+3:14
54	19	Zhao Zihe	China	89.5	85.0	+3:22
55	14	Vitalii Ivanov	Russia	84.5	83.1	+3:30
56	2	Markuss Vinogradovs	Latvia	81.0	80.5	+3:40
57	17	Sun Jianping	China	81.5	79.1	+3:46
58	18	Vyacheslav Bochkarev	Kazakhstan	77.5	67.5	+4:32
59	15	Danil Glukhov	Kazakhstan	74.0	61.6	+4:56
	9	Zhao Lixin	China	Disqualified		
	7	Zhao Jiawen	China	Disqualified		

=== Cross-country skiing ===
The cross-country skiing part was held at 15:15.

Rank	Bib	Athlete	Country	Start time	Cross-country time	Cross-country rank	Finish time	Deficit
1st place, gold medalist(s)	1	Jarl Magnus Riiber	Norway	0:00	25:01.3	8	25:01.3	
2nd place, silver medalist(s)	9	Bernhard Gruber	Austria	0:22	24:40.7	4	25:02.7	+1.4
3rd place, bronze medalist(s)	6	Akito Watabe	Japan	0:21	24:44.9	6	25:05.9	+4.6
4	3	Franz-Josef Rehrl	Austria	0:07	25:24.1	19	25:31.1	+29.8
5	24	Ilkka Herola	Finland	1:24	24:13.7	1	25:37.7	+36.4
6	2	Espen Bjørnstad	Norway	0:06	25:36.7	21	25:42.7	+41.4
7	17	Johannes Rydzek	Germany	1:16	24:39.1	3	25:55.1	+53.8
8	27	Jørgen Gråbak	Norway	1:31	24:40.8	5	26:11.8	+1:10.5
9	14	Leevi Mutru	Finland	0:59	25:14.9	14	26:13.9	+1:12.6
10	28	Antoine Gérard	France	1:32	24:45.2	7	26:17.2	+1:15.9
11	5	Samuel Costa	Italy	0:19	25:59.7	29	26:18.7	+1:17.4
12	38	Alessandro Pittin	Italy	2:00	24:21.4	2	26:21.4	+1:20.1
13	10	Vinzenz Geiger	Germany	0:35	25:46.8	27	26:21.8	+1:20.5
14	15	Martin Fritz	Austria	1:00	25:22.8	17	26:22.8	+1:21.5
15	22	Eric Frenzel	Germany	1:23	25:01.8	9	26:24.8	+1:23.5
16	18	Fabian Rießle	Germany	1:17	25:10.8	11	26:27.8	+1:26.5
17	4	Szczepan Kupczak	Poland	0:17	26:12.1	32	26:29.1	+1:27.8
18	12	Yoshito Watabe	Japan	0:40	25:50.4	28	26:30.4	+1:29.1
19	21	Hideaki Nagai	Japan	1:22	25:12.5	13	26:34.5	+1:33.2
20	16	Jan Schmid	Norway	1:12	25:39.9	24	26:51.9	+1:50.6
21	26	Adam Cieślar	Poland	1:30	25:38.2	23	27:08.2	+2:06.9
22	33	François Braud	France	1:46	25:23.2	18	27:09.2	+2:07.9
23	31	Aaron Kostner	Italy	1:42	25:28.8	20	27:10.8	+2:09.5
24	7	Terence Weber	Germany	0:21	26:52.8	40	27:13.8	+2:12.5
25	37	Tim Hug	Switzerland	1:57	25:17.8	15	27:14.8	+2:13.5
26	43	Raffaele Buzzi	Italy	2:18	25:12.0	12	27:30.0	+2:28.7
27	40	Tomáš Portyk	Czech Republic	2:12	25:19.7	16	27:31.7	+2:30.4
28	20	Paweł Słowiok	Poland	1:18	26:21.1	34	27:39.1	+2:37.8
29	34	Maxime Laheurte	France	1:48	26:06.0	30	27:54.0	+2:52.7
30	45	Arttu Mäkiaho	Finland	2:26	25:36.7	21	28:02.7	+3:01.4
31	36	Vid Vrhovnik	Slovenia	1:56	26:16.9	33	28:12.9	+3:11.6
32	25	Ben Loomis	United States	1:28	26:52.5	39	28:20.5	+3:19.2
33	8	Gō Yamamoto	Japan	0:22	27:59.0	48	28:21.0	+3:19.7
34	47	Lukáš Daněk	Czech Republic	2:36	25:46.7	26	28:22.7	+3:21.4
35	35	Ondřej Pažout	Czech Republic	1:55	26:32.8	35	28:27.8	+3:26.5
36	44	Jan Vytrval	Czech Republic	2:20	26:07.8	31	28:27.8	+3:26.5
37	49	Taylor Fletcher	United States	2:48	25:42.1	25	28:30.1	+3:28.8
38	19	Ernest Yahin	Russia	1:17	27:14.4	44	28:31.4	+3:30.1
39	30	Dmytro Mazurchuk	Ukraine	1:36	27:00.3	42	28:36.3	+3:35.0
40	13	Alexander Pashaev	Russia	0:56	27:52.8	47	28:48.8	+3:47.5
41	42	Laurent Muhlethaler	France	2:13	26:51.4	37	29:04.4	+4:03.1
42	29	Kristjan Ilves	Estonia	1:36	27:32.4	46	29:08.4	+4:07.1
43	41	Viktor Pasichnyk	Ukraine	2:13	27:12.9	43	29:25.9	+4:24.6
44	48	Jared Shumate	United States	2:46	26:52.2	38	29:38.2	+4:36.9
45	32	Jasper Good	United States	1:44	28:03.8	49	29:47.8	+4:46.5
46	50	Viacheslav Barkov	Russia	2:50	26:59.8	41	29:49.8	+4:48.5
47	55	Vitalii Ivanov	Russia	3:30	26:44.6	36	30:14.6	+5:13.3
48	51	Chingiz Rakparov	Kazakhstan	3:00	27:24.4	45	30:24.4	+5:23.1
49	46	Park Je-un	South Korea	2:32	28:18.5	50	30:50.5	+5:49.2
50	39	Paweł Twardosz	Poland	2:11	28:42.9	51	30:53.9	+5:52.6
51	52	Ožbej Jelen	Slovenia	3:01	28:43.7	52	31:44.7	+6:43.4
52	54	Zhao Zihe	China	3:22	29:20.8	53	32:42.8	+7:41.5
53	57	Sun Jianping	China	3:46	30:24.8	54	34:10.8	+9:09.5
54	53	Eldar Orussayev	~~Kazakhstan~~	3:14	31:53.6	57	35:07.6	+10:06.3
55	56	Markuss Vinogradovs	Latvia	3:40	31:37.3	55	35:17.3	+10:16.0
56	58	Vyacheslav Bochkarev	Kazakhstan	4:32	31:49.8	56	36:21.8	+11:20.5
57	59	Danil Glukhov	Kazakhstan	4:56	33:01.6	58	37:57.6	+12:56.3
	23	Eero Hirvonen	Finland	1:23	Did not finish			
DSQ	11	Mario Seidl	Austria	~~0:40~~	~~25:05.6~~	~~10~~	~~25:45.6~~	~~+44.3~~
