= FIS Nordic World Ski Championships 2019 – Team normal hill/4 × 5 km =

Team normal hill/4 × 5 km at the FIS Nordic World Ski Championships 2019
- Location: Seefeld in Tirol, Austria
- Dates: 2 March
- Competitors: 48 from 12 nations
- Teams: 12
- Winning time: 50:15.5

Medalists
| gold medal | Espen Bjørnstad; Jan Schmid; Jørgen Gråbak; Jarl Magnus Riiber | Norway |
| silver medal | Johannes Rydzek; Eric Frenzel; Fabian Rießle; Vinzenz Geiger | Germany |
| bronze medal | Gō Yamamoto; Yoshito Watabe; Hideaki Nagai; Akito Watabe | Japan |

The Team normal hill/4 × 5 km competition at the FIS Nordic World Ski Championships 2019 was held on 2 March 2019.

== Results ==
=== Ski jumping ===
The ski jumping part was started at 11:00.

| Rank | Bib | Country | Distance (m) | Points | Time difference |
|---|---|---|---|---|---|
| 1 | 10 | Austria; Bernhard Gruber; Mario Seidl; Franz-Josef Rehrl; Lukas Klapfer | 105.5; 111.5; 111.5; 100.5 | 493.9; 130.8; 128.7; 121.6; 112.8 | |
| 2 | 9 | Japan; Gō Yamamoto; Hideaki Nagai; Akito Watabe; Yoshito Watabe | 102.0; 105.0; 110.0; 108.5 | 493.0; 121.2; 117.2; 127.7; 126.9 | +0:01 |
| 3 | 12 | Norway; Espen Bjørnstad; Jørgen Gråbak; Jan Schmid; Jarl Magnus Riiber | 108.5; 98.0; 106.0; 107.0 | 481.0; 133.9; 107.7; 121.1; 118.3 | +0:17 |
| 4 | 11 | Germany; Vinzenz Geiger; Eric Frenzel; Johannes Rydzek; Fabian Rießle | 105.0; 100.0; 99.5; 103.5 | 463.4; 133.5; 110.3; 106.4; 113.2 | +0:41 |
| 5 | 7 | France; François Braud; Laurent Muhlethaler; Maxime Laheurte; Antoine Gérard | 100.0; 91.5; 99.5; 101.0 | 414.3; 110.0; 91.0; 105.0; 108.3 | +1:46 |
| 6 | 5 | Poland; Adam Cieślar; Paweł Twardosz; Paweł Słowiok; Szczepan Kupczak | 98.5; 92.0; 94.0; 104.0 | 411.9; 113.9; 85.1; 94.9; 118.0 | +1:49 |
| 7 | 8 | Finland; Leevi Mutru; Eero Hirvonen; Arttu Mäkiaho; Ilkka Herola | 90.5; 97.0; 94.5; 101.0 | 396.9; 95.5; 104.4; 90.3; 106.7 | +2:09 |
| 8 | 2 | Russia; Alexander Pashaev; Ernest Yahin; Viacheslav Barkov; Vitalii Ivanov | 99.5; 103.0; 85.5; 86.5 | 363.5; 104.7; 112.5; 69.5; 76.8 | +2:54 |
| 9 | 3 | United States; Taylor Fletcher; Grant Andrews; Jared Shumate; Ben Loomis | 94.5; 92.0; 82.5; 92.5 | 343.9; 90.8; 92.1; 69.6; 91.4 | +3:20 |
| 10 | 4 | Czech Republic; Tomáš Portyk; Ondřej Pažout; Lukáš Daněk; Jan Vytrval | 89.5; 92.5; 92.0; 86.5 | 341.9; 90.2; 91.4; 83.4; 76.9 | +3:23 |
| 11 | 6 | Italy; Aaron Kostner; Raffaele Buzzi; Alessandro Pittin; Samuel Costa | 106.5; 93.5; 96.0; DSQ | 317.1; 129.1; 94.0; 94.0; 0.0 | +3:56 |
| 12 | 1 | Kazakhstan; Danil Glukhov; Vyacheslav Bochkarev; Eldar Orussayev; Chingiz Rakparov | 75.5; 73.5; 81.0; 87.5 | 236.4; 52.7; 45.3; 61.8; 76.6 | +5:43 |

=== Cross-country skiing ===
The cross-country skiing part was started at 14:45.

| Rank | Bib | Country | Start time | Cross-country time | Rank | Finish time | Deficit |
|---|---|---|---|---|---|---|---|
| 1st place, gold medalist(s) | 3 | Norway; Espen Bjørnstad; Jan Schmid; Jørgen Gråbak; Jarl Magnus Riiber | 0:17 | 49:58.5; 12:24.8; 12:19.5; 12:10.6; 13:03.6 | 5 | 50:15.5 | |
| 2nd place, silver medalist(s) | 4 | Germany; Johannes Rydzek; Eric Frenzel; Fabian Rießle; Vinzenz Geiger | 0:41 | 49:35.5; 12:32.7; 11:45.3; 12:12.9; 13:04.6 | 3 | 50:16.5 | +1.0 |
| 3rd place, bronze medalist(s) | 2 | Japan; Gō Yamamoto; Yoshito Watabe; Hideaki Nagai; Akito Watabe | 0:01 | 50:43.2; 12:48.8; 12:33.4; 12:59.1; 12:21.9 | 7 | 50:44.2 | +28.7 |
| 4 | 7 | Finland; Arttu Mäkiaho; Leevi Mutru; Ilkka Herola; Eero Hirvonen | 2:09 | 49:16.1; 12:43.3; 12:15.8; 11:58.5; 12:18.5 | 2 | 51:25.1 | +1:09.6 |
| 5 | 5 | France; Laurent Muhlethaler; Maxime Laheurte; François Braud; Antoine Gérard | 1:46 | 49:41.5; 12:34.5; 12:25.1; 12:21.1; 12:20.8 | 4 | 51:27.5 | +1:12.0 |
| 6 | 11 | Italy; Raffaele Buzzi; Aaron Kostner; Samuel Costa; Alessandro Pittin | 3:56 | 48:58.6; 12:20.7; 12:05.8; 12:20.4; 12:11.7 | 1 | 52:54.6 | +2:39.1 |
| 7 | 6 | Poland; Adam Cieślar; Paweł Twardosz; Szczepan Kupczak; Paweł Słowiok | 1:49 | 51:20.5; 12:32.0; 13:06.6; 13:00.8; 12:41.1 | 9 | 53:09.5 | +2:54.0 |
| 8 | 10 | Czech Republic; Tomáš Portyk; Lukáš Daněk; Jan Vytrval; Ondřej Pažout | 3:23 | 51:20.1; 12:20.4; 12:17.1; 13:02.2; 13:40.4 | 8 | 54:43.1 | +4:27.6 |
| 9 | 9 | United States; Taylor Fletcher; Grant Andrews; Jared Shumate; Ben Loomis | 3:20 | 53:45.2; 12:35.6; 14:02.2; 13:28.4; 13:39.0 | 10 | 57:05.2 | +6:49.7 |
| 10 | 8 | Russia; Vitalii Ivanov; Ernest Yahin; Viacheslav Barkov; Alexander Pashaev | 2:54 | 54:46.1; 13:18.2; 13:52.4; 13:15.5; 14:20.0 | 11 | 57:40.1 | +7:24.6 |
| 11 | 12 | Kazakhstan; Chingiz Rakparov; Eldar Orussayev; Vyacheslav Bochkarev; Danil Glukhov | 5:43 | 59:16.2; 13:43.4; 14:37.4; 15:15.2; 15:40.2 | 12 | 1:04:59.2 | +14:43.7 |
| DSQ | 1 | Austria; Bernhard Gruber; Mario Seidl; Franz-Josef Rehrl; Lukas Klapfer | 0:00 | 50:20.5; 12:14.2; 12:33.3; 12:24.5; 13:08.5 | 6 | 50:20.5 | +5.0 |
