= FIS Nordic World Ski Championships 2017 – Team sprint large hill/2 × 7,5 km =

Team sprint large hill/2 × 7,5 km at the FIS Nordic World Ski Championships 2017
- Venue: Salpausselkä
- Location: Lahti, Finland
- Date: 3 March
- Competitors: 28 from 14 nations
- Teams: 14
- Winning time: 29:01.8

Medalists
gold medal	Eric Frenzel; Johannes Rydzek	Germany
silver medal	Magnus Krog; Magnus Moan	Norway
bronze medal	Yoshito Watabe; Akito Watabe	Japan

The Team sprint large hill/2 × 7,5 km event of the FIS Nordic World Ski Championships 2017 WAS held on 3 March 2017.

== Results ==
=== Ski jumping ===
The ski jumping part was started at 16:00.

Rank	Bib	Country	Distance (m)	Points	Time difference
1	9	France; François Braud; Maxime Laheurte	125.0; 125.0	264.2; 133.4; 130.8	
2	14	Germany; Eric Frenzel; Johannes Rydzek	125.5; 122.0	256.1; 129.9; 126.2	+0:16
3	11	Japan; Yoshito Watabe; Akito Watabe	123.0; 123.0	255.4; 128.9; 126.5	+0:18
4	12	Norway; Magnus Krog; Magnus Moan	126.5; 119.5	252.2; 133.2; 119.0	+0:24
5	13	Austria; Bernhard Gruber; Wilhelm Denifl	123.5; 120.5	250.2; 126.7; 123.5	+0:28
6	10	Finland; Eero Hirvonen; Ilkka Herola	118.0; 121.0	240.0; 118.0; 122.0	+0:48
7	2	Slovenia; Vid Vrhovnik; Marjan Jelenko	114.5; 121.5	232.1; 109.2; 122.9	+1:04
8	8	Italy; Alessandro Pittin; Samuel Costa	115.5; 112.5	219.5; 112.0; 107.5	+1:29
9	7	Czech Republic; Miroslav Dvořák; Tomáš Portyk	115.0; 112.0	214.4; 110.4; 104.0	+1:40
10	4	Estonia; Kail Piho; Kristjan Ilves	105.5; 119.5	209.4; 90.7; 118.7	+1:50
11	3	Poland; Paweł Słowiok; Adam Cieślar	107.5; 112.5	200.9; 95.5; 105.4	+2:07
12	6	United States; Taylor Fletcher; Bryan Fletcher	109.5; 109.5	200.1; 99.5; 100.6	+2:08
13	5	Russia; Samir Mastiev; Viacheslav Barkov	105.5; 112.5	194.4; 90.9; 103.5	+2:20
14	1	Ukraine; Dmytro Mazurchuk; Viktor Pasichnyk	103.5; 104.5	172.1; 84.7; 87.4	+3:04

=== Cross-country skiing ===
The cross-country skiing part was started at 18:15.

Rank	Bib	Country	Deficit	Time	Rank	Deficit
1st place, gold medalist(s)	2	Germany; Eric Frenzel; Johannes Rydzek	0:16	28:45.8; 13:58.7; 14:47.1	6	
2nd place, silver medalist(s)	4	Norway; Magnus Moan; Magnus Krog	0:24	28:38.8; 13:53.0; 14:45.8	1	+1.0
3rd place, bronze medalist(s)	3	Japan; Yoshito Watabe; Akito Watabe	0:18	28:54.0; 14:06.0; 14:48.0	8	+10.2
4	5	Austria; Wilhelm Denifl; Bernhard Gruber	0:28	28:44.5; 14:28.1; 14:16.4	5	+10.7
5	1	France; Maxime Laheurte; François Braud	0:00	29:13.3; 14:24.4; 14:48.9	10	+11.5
6	8	Italy; Samuel Costa; Alessandro Pittin	1:29	28:43.4; 14:22.3; 14:21.1	3	+1:10.6
7	6	Finland; Eero Hirvonen; Ilkka Herola	0:48	29:24.5; 14:42.2; 14:42.3	11	+1:10.7
8	9	Czech Republic; Tomáš Portyk; Miroslav Dvořák	1:40	28:48.2; 14:20.6; 14:27.6	7	+1:26.4
9	12	United States; Bryan Fletcher; Taylor Fletcher	2:08	28:41.9; 14:24.2; 14:17.7	2	+1:48.1
10	11	Poland; Adam Cieślar; Paweł Słowiok	2:07	28:43.5; 14:24.5; 14:19.0	4	+1:48.7
11	7	Slovenia; Vid Vrhovnik; Marjan Jelenko	1:04	29:47.3; 14:54.8; 14:52.5	12	+1:49.5
12	10	Estonia; Kristjan Ilves; Kail Piho	1:50	29:02.9; 14:21.3; 14:41.6	9	+1:51.1
13	13	Russia; Samir Mastiev; Viacheslav Barkov	2:20	LAP		
14	14	Ukraine; Viktor Pasichnyk; Dmytro Mazurchuk	3:04	LAP		
