= Nordic combined at the 2017 Winter Universiade =

Nordic combined at the XXVIII Winter Universiade
- Venue: Alatau Cross-Country Skiing & Biathlon Complex
- Dates: 1–5 February 2017

Nordic combined at the 2017 Winter Universiade was held in Alatau Cross-Country Skiing & Biathlon Complex from February 1 to February 5, 2017.

== Events ==
Event	Gold		Silver		Bronze	
Individual normal hill/10 km	(Russia) Viacheslav Barkov	24:26.5	(Poland) Adam Cieślar	24:27.5	(Poland) Paweł Słowiok	24:34.3
Individual mass start 10 km/normal hill	(Poland) Adam Cieślar	242.2	(Germany) Tobias Simon	240.4	(Japan) Go Sonehara	233.2
Team normal hill/3 x 5 km	(Poland) Poland; Wojciech Marusarz; Adam Cieślar; Paweł Słowiok	34:27.9	(Russia) Russia; Timofey Borisov; Samir Mastiev; Viacheslav Barkov	34:57.7	(Japan) Japan; Shota Horigome; Go Yamamoto; Go Sonehara	35:29.1

== Medal table ==
Rank	Nation	Gold	Silver	Bronze	Total
1	Poland	2	1	1	4
2	Russia	1	1	0	2
3	Germany	0	1	0	1
4	Japan	0	0	2	2
Totals (4 entries)		3	3	3	9
