= Nordic combined at the 2013 Winter Universiade =

Nordic Combined at the 2013 Winter Universiade was held at the Trampolino dal Ben in Predazzo at Stadio del Fondo di Lago di Tesero in Tesero from December 13 to December 18, 2013.

== Events ==
Event	Gold		Silver		Bronze	
Individual Gundersen	Adam Cieślar; Poland	26:48.0	Johannes Wasel; Germany	26:58.1	Aguri Shimizu; Japan	27:07.2
Mass start	Aguri Shimizu; Japan	268.5	Adam Cieślar; Poland	267.1	Paweł Słowiok; Poland	262.2
Team Gundersen	Poland (POL); Szczepan Kupczak; Paweł Słowiok; Adam Cieślar	38:41.6	Slovenia (SLO); Borut Mavc; Jože Kamenik; Matič Plaznic	38:49.4	Japan (JPN); Go Yamamoto; Shota Horigome; Aguri Shimizu	38:54.0
