= Nordic combined at the 2015 Winter Universiade =

Nordic combined at the 2015 Winter Universiade was held in Štrbské Pleso from January 26 to January 31, 2015.

== Events ==
Event	Gold		Silver		Bronze	
Individual normal hill/10 km	(Poland) Adam Cieślar	26:18.3	(Germany) David Welde	26:18.3	(Poland) Szczepan Kupczak	26:55.8
Individual mass start 10 km/normal hill	(Poland) Adam Cieślar	216.9	(Germany) David Welde	210.3	(Poland) Mateusz Wantulok	208.4
Team normal hill/3 x 5 km	(Germany) Germany; Johannes Wasel; Tobias Simon; David Welde	42:33.2	(Japan) Japan; Go Yamamoto; Aguri Shimizu; Takehiro Watanabe	42:43.3	(Russia) Russia; Samir Mastiev; Niyaz Nabeev; Ernest Yahin	43:01.0

== Medal table ==
Rank	Nation	Gold	Silver	Bronze	Total
1	Poland	2	0	2	4
2	Germany	1	2	0	3
3	Japan	0	1	0	1
4	Russia	0	0	1	1
Totals (4 entries)		3	3	3	9
