= Wasel =

Wasel may refer to:

- Johannes Wasel (born 1991), German skier
- Wasel, Alberta, a locality in Canada

== See also ==
- Al Wasl SC, a multi-sports club in Dubai
