= 2017–18 FIS Nordic Combined World Cup =

International skiing competition

Nordic Combined World Cup 2017/18
Winners
- Overall: (Japan) Akito Watabe
- Nations Cup: Norway
- Triple trophy: (Japan) Akito Watabe

Competitions
- Venues: 13
- Individual: 22
- Team: 6

The 2017/18 FIS Nordic Combined World Cup was the 35th World Cup season, organized by the International Ski Federation. It started on 24 November 2017 in Ruka, Finland and concluded on 25 March 2018 in Schonach, Germany.

== Calendar ==
=== Men ===
Num	Season	Date	Place	Hill	Discipline	Winner	Second	Third	Yellow bib	Ref.
484	1	24 November 2017	(Finland) Ruka	Rukatunturi	HS142 / 5 km	(Norway) Espen Andersen	(Norway) Jan Schmid	(Japan) Akito Watabe	(Norway) Espen Andersen	
485	2	25 November 2017	(Finland) Ruka	Rukatunturi	HS142 / 10 km	(Japan) Akito Watabe	(Finland) Eero Hirvonen	(Germany) Johannes Rydzek	(Japan) Akito Watabe	
486	3	26 November 2017	(Finland) Ruka	Rukatunturi	HS142 / 10 km	(Germany) Johannes Rydzek	(Germany) Eric Frenzel	(Finland) Eero Hirvonen	(Japan) Akito Watabe	
1st Ruka Tour (24–26 November 2017)						(Japan) Akito Watabe	(Norway) Espen Andersen	(Germany) Johannes Rydzek	(Japan) Akito Watabe	
487	4	3 December 2017	(Norway) Lillehammer	Lysgårdsbakken	HS138 / 10 km	(Norway) Espen Andersen	(Norway) Jan Schmid	(Norway) Jørgen Graabak	(Norway) Espen Andersen	
488	5	16 December 2017	(Austria) Ramsau	W90-Mattensprunganlage	HS98 / 10 km	(Germany) Eric Frenzel	(Germany) Fabian Rießle	(Norway) Jan Schmid	(Norway) Espen Andersen	
489	6	17 December 2017	(Austria) Ramsau	W90-Mattensprunganlage	HS98 / 10 km	(Germany) Fabian Rießle	(Italy) Alessandro Pittin	(Finland) Eero Hirvonen	(Norway) Jan Schmid	
		6 January 2018	(Estonia) Otepää	Tehvandi	HS100 / 10 km	lack of snow and warm temperatures; not rescheduled				
490	7	12 January 2018	(Italy) Val di Fiemme	Trampolino dal Ben	HS134 / 10 km	(Norway) Jorgen Graabak	(Germany) Johannes Rydzek	(Austria) Lukas Klapfer	(Norway) Jan Schmid	
491	8	14 January 2018	(Italy) Val di Fiemme	Trampolino dal Ben	HS134 / 10 km	(Norway) Jan Schmid	(Austria) Lukas Klapfer	(Germany) Fabian Rießle	(Norway) Jan Schmid	
492	9	20 January 2018	(France) Chaux-Neuve	La Côté Feuillée	HS118 / 10 km	(Norway) Jan Schmid	(Japan) Akito Watabe	(Finland) Ilkka Herola	(Norway) Jan Schmid	
5th Nordic Combined Triple (26–28 January 2018)
493	10	26 January 2018	(Austria) Seefeld	Toni-Seelos-Olympiaschanze	HS109 / 5 km	(Japan) Akito Watabe	(Norway) Jarl Magnus Riiber	(Germany) Fabian Rießle	(Norway) Jan Schmid	
494	11	27 January 2018	(Austria) Seefeld	Toni-Seelos-Olympiaschanze	HS109 / 10 km	(Japan) Akito Watabe	(Germany) Vinzenz Geiger	(Norway) Jarl Magnus Riiber	(Norway) Jan Schmid	
495	12	28 January 2018	(Austria) Seefeld	Toni-Seelos-Olympiaschanze	HS109 / 15 km	(Japan) Akito Watabe	(Norway) Jarl Magnus Riiber	(Germany) Fabian Rießle	(Japan) Akito Watabe	
496	13	3 February 2018	(Japan) Hakuba	Olympic Hills	HS134 / 10 km	(Japan) Akito Watabe	(Norway) Jan Schmid	(Germany) Manuel Faißt	(Japan) Akito Watabe	
497	14	4 February 2018	(Japan) Hakuba	Olympic Hills	HS134 / 10 km	(Norway) Jan Schmid	(Estonia) Kristjan Ilves	(Japan) Akito Watabe	(Japan) Akito Watabe	
2018 Winter Olympics
498	15	4 March 2018	(Finland) Lahti	Salpausselkä	HS130 / 10 km	(Germany) Johannes Rydzek	(Germany) Vinzenz Geiger	(Norway) Jørgen Graabak	(Japan) Akito Watabe	
499	16	10 March 2018	(Norway) Oslo	Holmenkollbakken	HS134 / 10 km	(Japan) Akito Watabe	(Germany) Fabian Rießle	(Austria) Mario Seidl	(Japan) Akito Watabe	
500	17	13 March 2018	(Norway) Trondheim	Granåsen	HS140 / 10 km	(Germany) Eric Frenzel	(Japan) Akito Watabe	(Germany) Fabian Rießle	(Japan) Akito Watabe	
501	18	14 March 2018	(Norway) Trondheim	Granåsen	HS140 / 10 km	(Germany) Fabian Rießle	(Norway) Jarl Magnus Riiber	(Finland) Eero Hirvonen	(Japan) Akito Watabe	
502	19	17 March 2018	(Germany) Klingenthal	Vogtland Arena	HS140 / 10 km	(Germany) Fabian Rießle	(Finland) Eero Hirvonen	(Japan) Akito Watabe	(Japan) Akito Watabe	
503	20	18 March 2018	(Germany) Klingenthal	Vogtland Arena	HS140 / 10 km	(Germany) Fabian Rießle	(Germany) Johannes Rydzek	(Japan) Akito Watabe	(Japan) Akito Watabe	
504	21	24 March 2018	(Germany) Schonach	Langenwaldschanze	HS106 / 10 km	(Japan) Akito Watabe	(Norway) Jarl Magnus Riiber	(Austria) Bernhard Gruber	(Japan) Akito Watabe	
505	22	25 March 2018	(Germany) Schonach	Langenwaldschanze	HS106 / 15 km	(Japan) Akito Watabe	(Norway) Jarl Magnus Riiber	(Germany) Fabian Rießle	(Japan) Akito Watabe	

=== Men's team ===
Num	Season	Date	Place	Hill	Discipline	Winner	Second	Third	Yellow bib	Ref.
37	1	2 December 2017	(Norway) Lillehammer	Lysgårdsbakken	HS100 / 4x5 km Relay	Norway Jan Schmid; Espen Andersen; Jarl Magnus Riiber; Jørgen Graabak	Germany Eric Frenzel; Johannes Rydzek; Vinzenz Geiger; Fabian Rießle	France François Braud; Maxime Laheurte; Antoine Gerard; Jason Lamy-Chappuis	Norway	
		7 January 2018	(Estonia) Otepää	Tehvandi	HS100 / 2x7.5 km Sprint	lack of snow and warm temperatures; not rescheduled				
38	2	13 January 2018	(Italy) Val di Fiemme	Trampolino dal Ben	HS134 / 2x7.5 km Sprint	Germany II Eric Frenzel; Vinzenz Geiger	Germany I Fabian Rießle; Johannes Rydzek	Norway Mikko Kokslien; Magnus Moan	Norway	
39	3	21 January 2018	(France) Chaux-Neuve	La Côté Feuillée	HS118 / 4x5 km Relay	Norway Jan Schmid; Espen Andersen; Jarl Magnus Riiber; Jørgen Graabak	Germany Eric Frenzel; Fabian Rießle; Johannes Rydzek; Vinzenz Geiger	Finland Leevi Mutru; Arttu Maekiaho; Ilkka Herola; Eero Hirvonen	Norway	
40	4	3 March 2018	(Finland) Lahti	Salpausselkä	HS130 / 2x7.5 km Sprint	Austria I Wilhelm Denifl; Bernhard Gruber	Norway I Jan Schmid; Jørgen Graabak	Finland I Eero Hirvonen; Ilkka Herola	Norway	

== Standings ==
=== Overall ===
Rank	after all 22 events	Points
1	(Japan) Akito Watabe	1495
2	(Norway) Jan Schmid	1133
3	(Germany) Fabian Rießle	1087
4	(Germany) Johannes Rydzek	849
5	(Norway) Jørgen Graabak	830
6	(Finland) Eero Hirvonen	755
7	(Norway) Jarl Magnus Riiber	669
8	(Germany) Eric Frenzel	622
9	(Norway) Espen Andersen	593
10	(Finland) Ilkka Herola	500

=== Nations Cup ===
Rank	after all 26 events	Points
1	Norway	5033
2	Germany	4903
3	Austria	2944
4	Japan	2896
5	Finland	2247
6	France	1515
7	Italy	515
8	Estonia	270
9	Czech Republic	264
10	United States	234

=== Prize money ===
Rank	after all 27 payouts	CHF
1	(Japan) Akito Watabe	113760
2	(Germany) Fabian Rießle	81550
3	(Norway) Jan Schmid	78190
4	(Germany) Johannes Rydzek	60630
5	(Norway) Jørgen Graabak	51548
6	(Norway) Jarl Magnus Riiber	49660
7	(Germany) Eric Frenzel	44434
8	(Finland) Eero Hirvonen	41860
9	(Norway) Espen Andersen	41460
10	(Germany) Vinzenz Geiger	33030

=== Best Jumper Trophy ===
Rank	after all 22 events	Points
1	(Japan) Akito Watabe	1447
2	(Norway) Jarl Magnus Riiber	1130
3	(Austria) Mario Seidl	776
4	(Norway) Jan Schmid	751
5	(Austria) Wilhelm Denifl	746
6	(Austria) Franz-Josef Rehrl	675
7	(Norway) Espen Andersen	640
8	(Norway) Jørgen Graabak	613
9	(Japan) Gō Yamamoto	590
10	(Germany) Fabian Rießle	557

=== Best Skier Trophy ===
Rank	after all 22 events	Points
1	(Italy) Alessandro Pittin	1421
2	(Finland) Ilkka Herola	1120
3	(Germany) Johannes Rydzek	974
4	(Germany) Fabian Rießle	690
5	(Germany) Eric Frenzel	660
6	(Finland) Eero Hirvonen	656
7	(Norway) Jan Schmid	611
8	(Norway) Magnus Moan	557
9	(Germany) Björn Kircheisen	540
10	(Norway) Mikko Kokslien	478

== Achievements ==
First World Cup podium

- Espen Andersen (NOR), 24, in his 6th season – no. 1 in the WC 1 in Ruka
- Kristjan Ilves (EST), 21, in his 6th season – no. 2 in the WC 15 in Hakuba

Victories in this World Cup (in brackets victory for all time)

- Akito Watabe (JPN), 8 (17) first places
- Fabian Rießle (GER), 4 (9) first places
- Jan Schmid (NOR), 3 (5) first places
- Eric Frenzel (GER), 2 (43) first places
- Johannes Rydzek (GER), 2 (16) first places
- Espen Andersen (NOR), 2 (2) first places
- Jørgen Graabak (NOR), 1 (4) first place

== Retirements ==
Following are notable Nordic combined skiers who announced their retirement:

- Bryan Fletcher (USA)
- Hannu Manninen (FIN)
- Mikko Kokslien (NOR)
- Jason Lamy-Chappuis (FRA)
- Björn Kircheisen (GER)
- Kail Piho (EST)
- Taihei Kato (JPN)
- Adam Loomis (USA)
- Sepp Schneider (AUT)
- Armin Bauer (ITA)
- Karl-August Tiirmaa (EST)
- Han Hendrik Piho (EST)
