= Eero Hirvonen =

Finnish Nordic combined skier

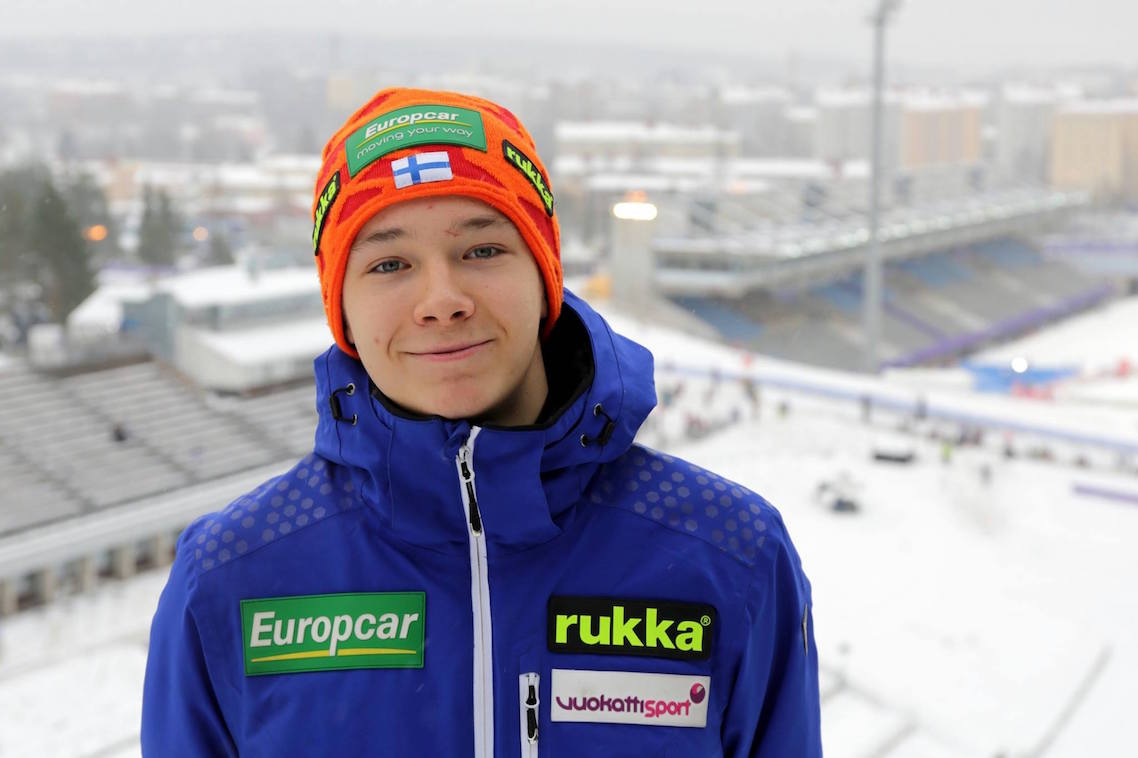
- Hirvonen in 2016

Personal information
- Born: 30 January 1996 (age 30) Laukaa, Finland
- Height: 181 cm (5 ft 11 in)

Sport
- Sport: Skiing
- Club: Jyväskylän Hiihtoseura

World Cup career
- Seasons: 2015–
- Indiv. podiums: 6
- Indiv. wins: 0
Medal record
Men's Nordic combined
Representing Finland
Olympic Games
Silver medal – second place	2026 Milano Cortina	Team LH
Bronze medal – third place	2026 Milano Cortina	Individual NH
- Updated on 19 February 2026

Eero Hirvonen (born 30 January 1996) is a Finnish Nordic combined skier. He won a silver medal in the men's team Nordic combined and a bronze medal in the men's individual normal hill Nordic combined at the 2026 Winter Olympics.

== Career ==
Hirvonen was born in Laukaa. He debuted in the World Cup in the 2015–16 season in Lahti, Finland on 6 March 2016, finishing 33rd in the Large Hill. His best result in the world cup is 2nd place in the 2016–17 World Cup in Lahti, Finland in January 2017.

Together with Ilkka Herola, he won the 2 x 7,5 km team sprint on 9 February 2019, in front of their home crowd in Lahti.

== Nordic combined results ==
=== Olympic Games ===
- 2 medals – (1 silver, 1 bronze)

Year	Individual NH	Individual LH	Team LH
2018	6	6	6
2022	17	20	8
2026	Bronze	5	Silver

=== World Championships ===
Year	Individual NH	Individual LH	Team NH/LH	Team Sprint LH/Mixed Team NH
2017	9	21	5	7
2019	DNF2	20	5	7
2021	—	18	5	5
2023	19	11	5	6
2025	26	42	4	8

=== World Cup ===
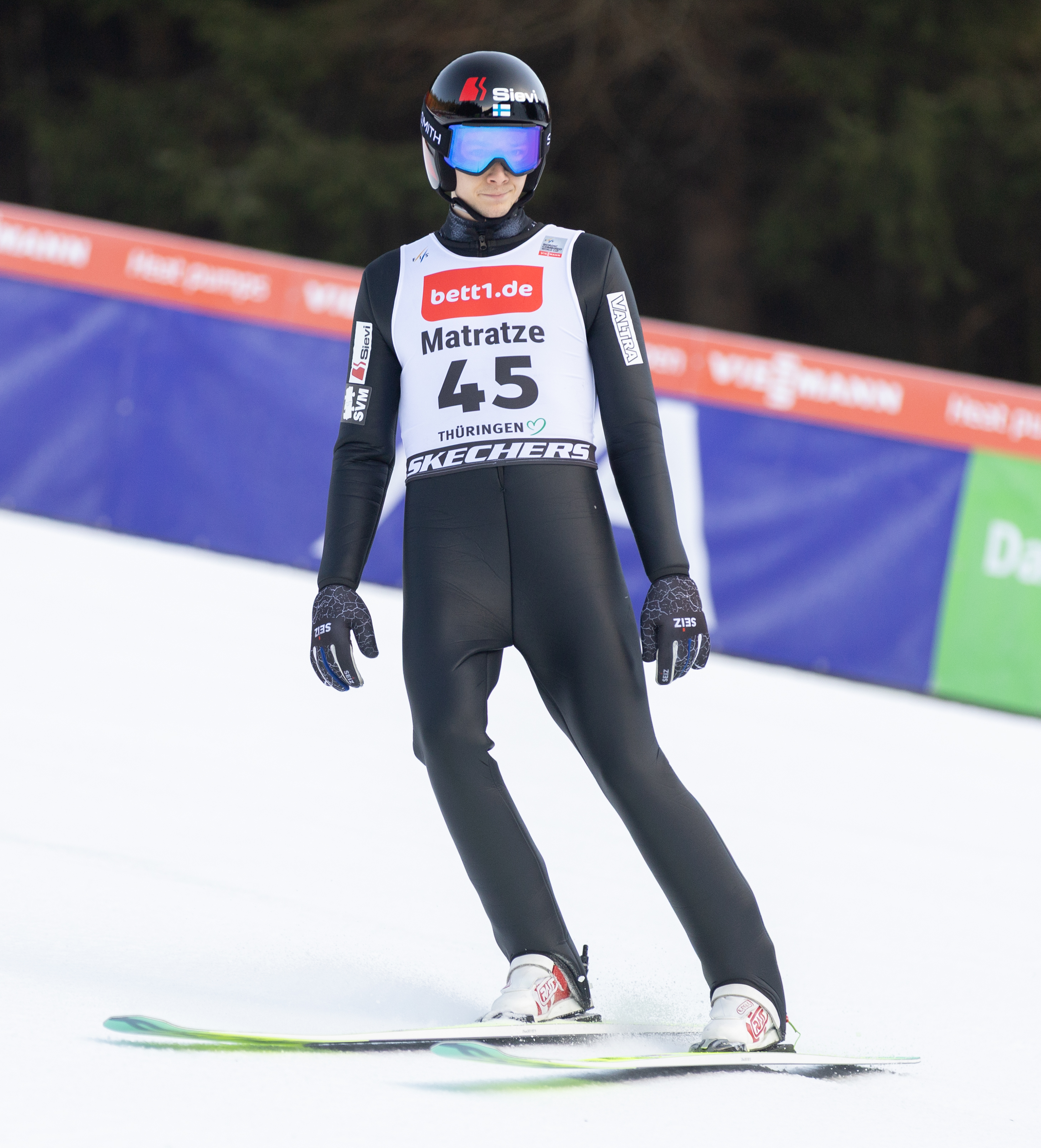
Eero Hirvonen at FIS Nordic Combined World Cup, Oberhof 2026

==== Individual Podiums ====
- 6 podiums

Season	Date	Location	Discipline	Place
2016–17	7 January 2017	(Finland) Lahti	HS130/10 km	2nd
2017–18	25 November 2017	(Finland) Rukatunturi	HS142/10 km	2nd
2017–18	26 November 2017	(Finland) Rukatunturi	HS142/10 km	3rd
2017–18	17 December 2017	(Austria) Ramsau	HS98/10 km	3rd
2017–18	14 March 2018	(Norway) Trondheim	HS140/10 km	3rd
2017–18	17 March 2018	(Germany) Klingenthal	HS140/10 km	2nd

==== Team Podiums ====
Season	Date	Location	Discipline	Place	Team member(s)
2017–18	21 January 2018	(France) Chaux-Neuve	HS118/4x5km	3rd	Leevi Mutru, Arttu Mäkiaho, Ilkka Herola
2017–18	3 March 2018	(Finland) Lahti	HS130/2x7,5 km	3rd	Ilkka Herola
2018–19	9 February 2019	(Finland) Lahti	HS130/2x7,5 km	1st	Ilkka Herola
2020–21	16 January 2021	(Italy) Val di Fiemme	HS106/2x7,5 km	3rd	Ilkka Herola
