= Vinzenz Geiger =

German Nordic combined skier

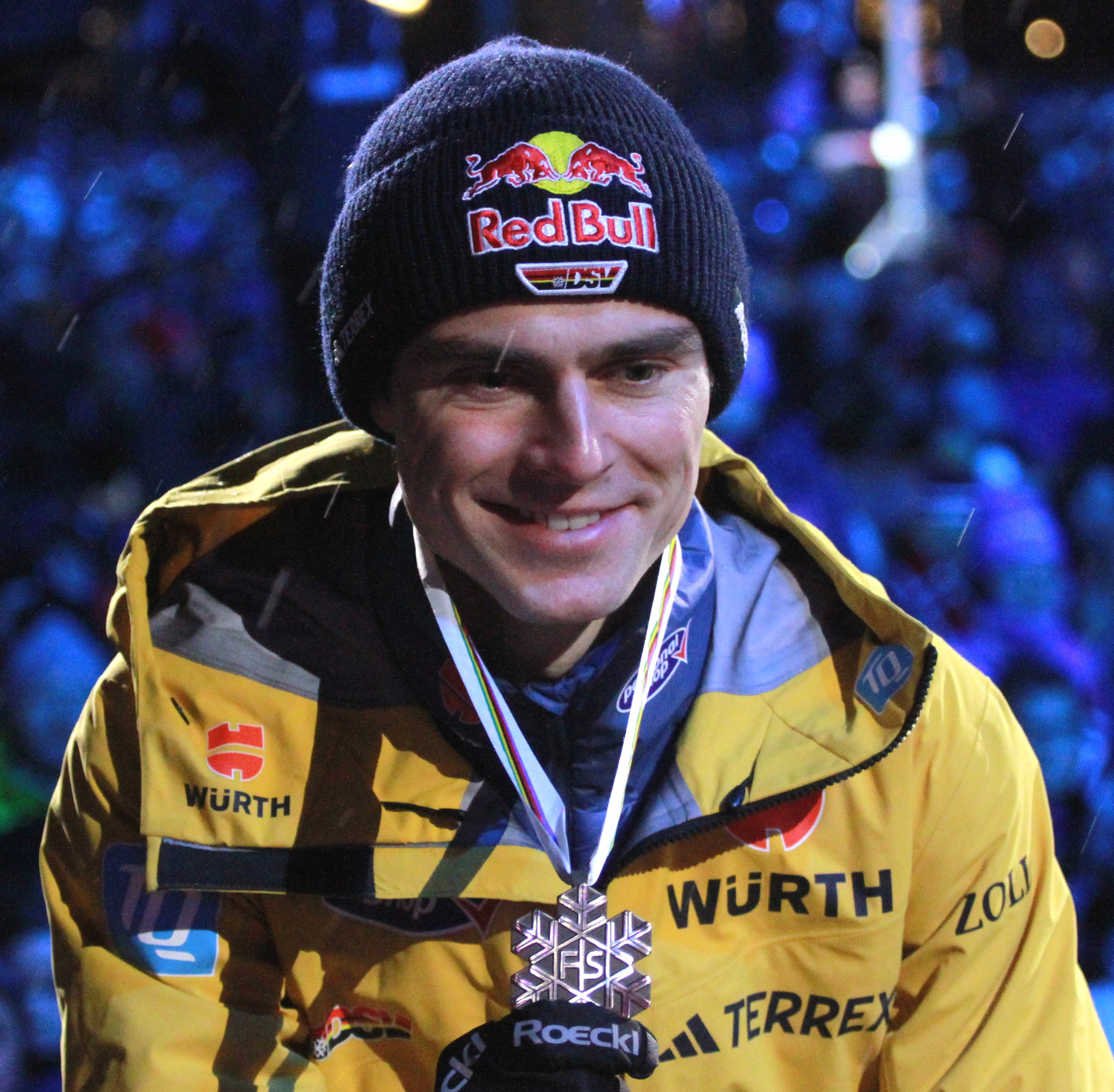
- Geiger in 2025

Personal information
- Nationality: Germany
- Born: 24 July 1997 (age 29) Oberstdorf, Germany
- Height: 1.83 m (6 ft 0 in)

Sport
- Sport: Skiing
- Club: SC 1906 Oberstdorf

World Cup career
- Seasons: 2015–
- Indiv. starts: 167
- Indiv. podiums: 49
- Indiv. wins: 16
- Team starts: 14
- Team podiums: 12
- Team wins: 3

Achievements and titles
- Personal bests: 203.0 m (666.0 ft); Oberstdorf, 17 March 2022
Medal record
Men's Nordic combined
Representing Germany
Olympic Games
Gold medal – first place	2018 Pyeongchang	Team LH
Gold medal – first place	2022 Beijing	Individual NH
Silver medal – second place	2022 Beijing	Team LH
World Championships
Gold medal – first place	2025 Trondheim	Team LH
Silver medal – second place	2019 Seefeld	Team NH
Silver medal – second place	2021 Oberstdorf	Team NH
Silver medal – second place	2023 Planica	Team LH
Silver medal – second place	2023 Planica	Mixed team
Silver medal – second place	2025 Trondheim	Mixed team
Bronze medal – third place	2025 Trondheim	Individual NH
Bronze medal – third place	2025 Trondheim	Individual LH
- Updated on 1 March 2025

Vinzenz Geiger (born 24 July 1997) is a German Nordic combined skier and the 2022 Olympic normal hill champion.

He debuted in the World Cup in the 2015–16 season in Lillehammer, Norway in December 2016 finishing 31st in the Large Hill. His first win in the World Cup came in Val di Fiemme, in the 2018–19 season, in January 2019.

He is the second cousin of the ski jumper Karl Geiger.

== Record ==
=== Olympic Games ===
Event	Normal hill	Large hill	Team
2018	9	7	Gold
2022	Gold	7	Silver
2026	10	18	5

=== World Championship ===
Year	Individual LH	Individual NH	Team	Team sprint Mixed team
2019	12	14	Silver	—
2021	15	14	Silver	—
2023	14	4	Silver	Silver
2025	Bronze	Bronze	—	Silver

== World Cup ==
=== Standings ===
Season	Overall	NC-Triple
2015/16	51	—
2016/17	20	—
2017/18	12	4
2018/19	5	10
2019/20	3rd place, bronze medalist(s)	3rd place, bronze medalist(s)
2020/21	2nd place, silver medalist(s)	5
2021/22	3rd place, bronze medalist(s)	4
2022/23	7	4

=== Individual victories ===
No.	Season	Date	Location
1	2018/19	13 January 2019	(Italy) Val di Fiemme
2	2019/20	21 December 2019	(Austria) Ramsau
3	2019/20	11 January 2020	(Italy) Val di Fiemme
4	2020/21	19 December 2020	(Austria) Ramsau
5	2020/21	20 December 2020	(Austria) Ramsau
6	2020/21	6 February 2021	(Germany) Klingenthal
7	2020/21	7 February 2021	(Germany) Klingenthal
8	2021/22	9 January 2022	(Italy) Val di Fiemme
9	2021/22	29 January 2022	(Austria) Seefeld
10	2022/23	17 December 2022	(Austria) Ramsau
