= Magnus Krog =

Norwegian Nordic combined skier (born 1987)

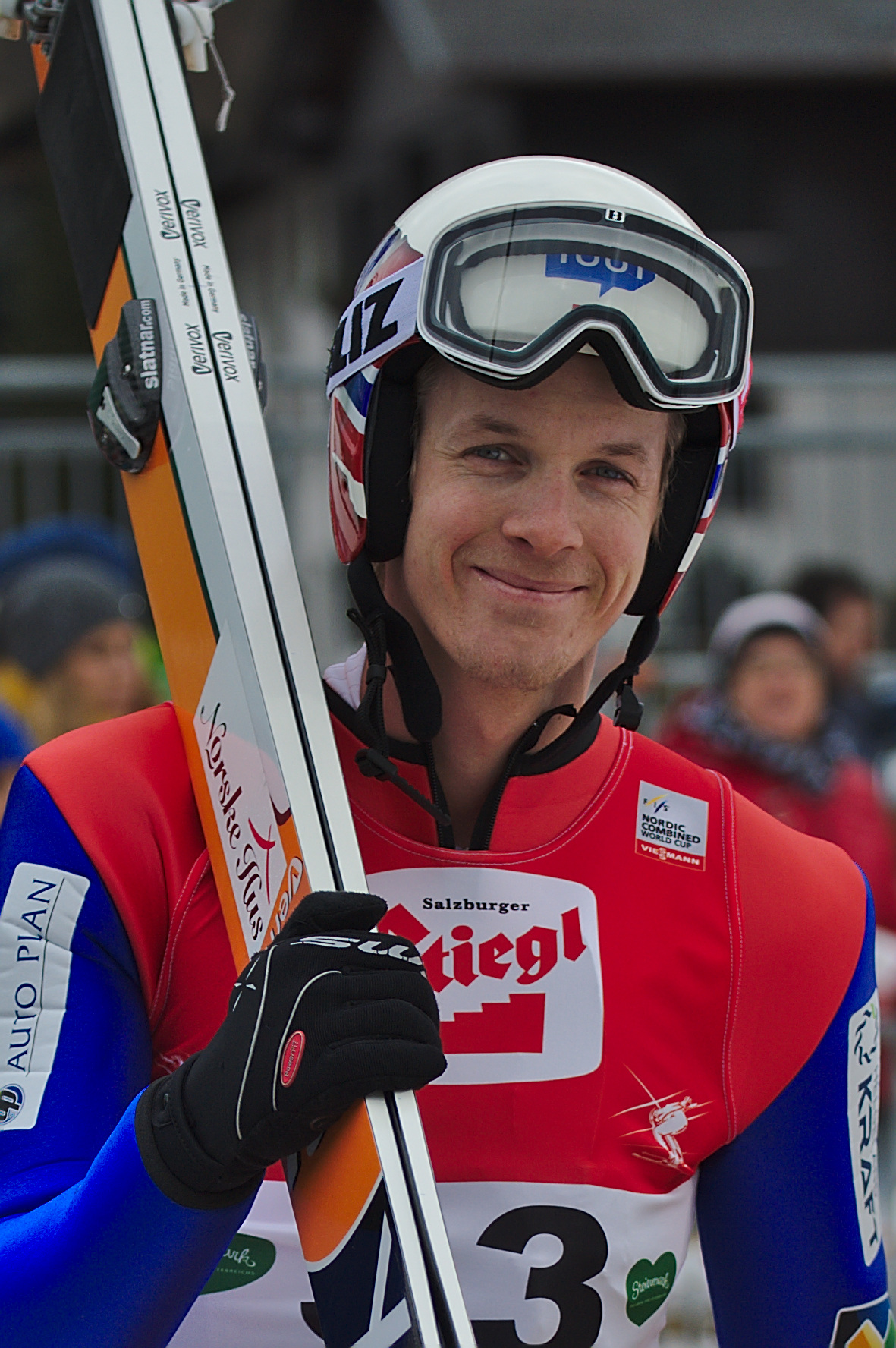
- Krog in 2016

Personal information
- Born: 19 March 1987 (age 39) Hoydalsmo, Norway
- Height: 1.87 m (6 ft 2 in)

Sport
- Sport: Skiing
- Club: Høydalsmo IL

World Cup career
- Seasons: 2008–
- Indiv. podiums: 11
- Indiv. wins: 3
Medal record
Olympic Games
Gold medal – first place	2014 Sochi	4 x 5 km relay
Bronze medal – third place	2014 Sochi	10 km normal hill
World Championships
Silver medal – second place	2013 Val di Flemme	Team normal hill
Silver medal – second place	2017 Lahti	4 x 5 km team
Silver medal – second place	2017 Lahti	Team sprint

Magnus Krog (born 19 March 1987) is a Norwegian Nordic combined skier who has competed since 2005.

== Career ==
Krog has three individual and three team World Cup wins in his career. At the 2014 Sochi Winter Olympics, he won the bronze medal in the 10 km normal hill event and the gold in the 4x5 km relay.
