= Akito Watabe =

Japanese Nordic combined skier

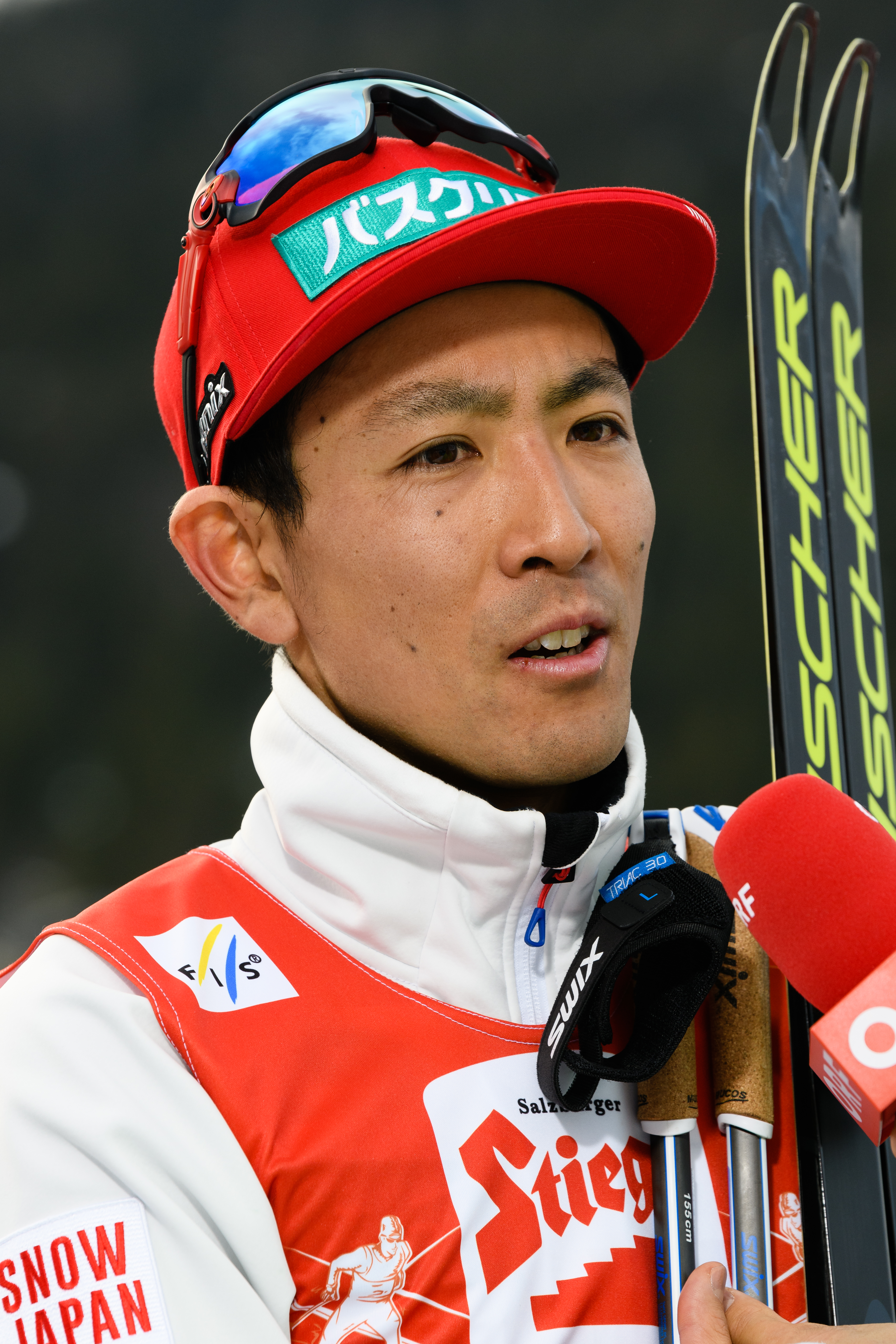
- Watabe in 2018

Personal information
- Nationality: Japan
- Born: 26 May 1988 (age 38) Hakuba, Japan
- Height: 1.73 m (5 ft 8 in)

Sport
- Sport: Skiing
- Club: Kitano Construction Corp.Ski Club

World Cup career
- Seasons: 2005–2026
- Indiv. starts: 303
- Indiv. podiums: 74
- Indiv. wins: 19
- Overall titles: 1 (2018)
Medal record
Men's Nordic combined
Representing Japan
Olympic Games
Silver medal – second place	2014 Sochi	Individual NH
Silver medal – second place	2018 Pyeongchang	Individual NH
Bronze medal – third place	2022 Beijing	Individual LH
Bronze medal – third place	2022 Beijing	Team LH
World Championships
Gold medal – first place	2009 Liberec	4 x 5 km team
Silver medal – second place	2017 Lahti	Individual LH
Bronze medal – third place	2017 Lahti	Team sprint
Bronze medal – third place	2019 Seefeld	Individual NH
Bronze medal – third place	2019 Seefeld	Team NH
Bronze medal – third place	2021 Oberstdorf	Individual LH

Akito Watabe (渡部 暁斗, Watabe Akito; born 26 May 1988) is a Japanese retired Nordic combined skier. He won a gold medal in the 4 × 5 km team event at the FIS Nordic World Ski Championships 2009 in Liberec.

== Career ==
Competing in six Winter Olympics, Watabe won four olympic medals: two silvers and two bronzes.

During the 2014 Sochi Winter Olympics, Akito Watabe took home the silver medal in the Nordic Combined Individual Gundersen NH / 10 km, Cross-Country event.

In the 2018 Olympics, Watabe won the silver medal in the normal hill/10 km Nordic combined competition.

In the 2022 Olympics, Akito Watabe won two bronze medals in the large hill/10 km and Team large hill Nordic combined competition.

He has the record of most starts in the history of the FIS Nordic Combined World Cup, 303.

== Personal life ==
His wife, Yurie Watabe, is a Japanese freestyle skier, who specialises in halfpipe. Akito's younger brother, Yoshito also competes in Nordic Combined World Cup.

== World Cup wins ==
Season	Date	Location	Hill
2011–12	5 February 2012	(Italy) Val di Fiemme	HS134/10 km
2011–12	18 February 2012	(Germany) Klingenthal	HS140/10 km
2011–12	26 February 2012	(Czech Republic) Liberec	HS134/10 km
2011–12	9 March 2012	(Norway) Oslo	HS106/10 km
2013–14	15 March 2014	(Sweden) Falun	HS134/10 km
2014–15	6 March 2015	(Finland) Lahti	HS130/10 km
2014–15	14 March 2015	(Norway) Oslo	HS104/15 km
2016–17	11 February 2017	(Japan) Sapporo	HS134/10 km
2016–17	11 March 2017	(Norway) Oslo	HS104/10 km
2017–18	25 November 2017	(Finland) Ruka	HS142/10 km
2017–18	26 January 2018	(Austria) Seefeld	HS109/5 km
2017–18	27 January 2018	(Austria) Seefeld	HS109/10 km
2017–18	28 January 2018	(Austria) Seefeld	HS109/15 km
2017–18	3 February 2018	(Japan) Hakuba	HS134/10 km
2017–18	10 March 2018	(Norway) Oslo	HS104/10 km
2017–18	24 March 2018	(Germany) Schonach	HS106/10 km
2017–18	25 March 2018	(Germany) Schonach	HS106/15 km
2019–20	1 March 2020	(Finland) Lahti	HS130/10 km
2020–21	24 January 2021	(Finland) Lahti	HS130/10 km
