= Johannes Wasel =

German Nordic combined skier

Johannes Wasel (born 1991) is a retired German Nordic combined skier.

He made his Continental Cup debut in February 2010 in Eisenerz. Competing fairly often on the Continental Cup circuit until December 2014, he finished on the podium three times in individual competition.

He made his World Cup debut in January 2012 in Oberstdorf. He collected his first World Cup points in January 2013, when he finished 23rd in Klingenthal. His last World Cup outing was a 28th place in January 2014 in Chaykovsky.

He won the silver medal in the normal hill/10 kilometres at the 2013 Winter Universiade and a gold medal in the team competition at the 2015 Winter Universiade.

He represented the sports club SK Baiersbronn.
