= Jan Schmid =

Norwegian Nordic combined skier (born 1983)

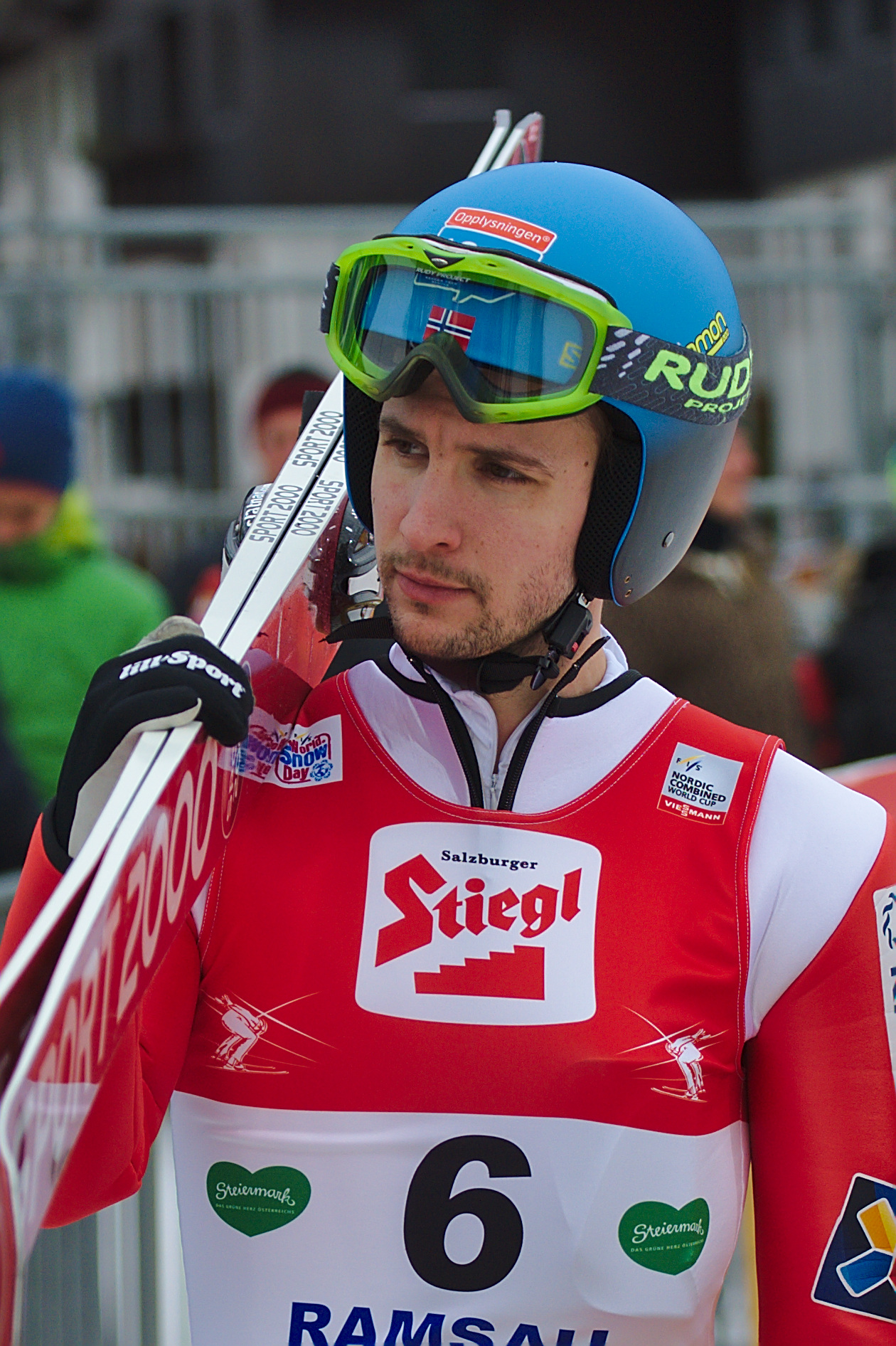

Personal information
- Nationality: Norway
- Born: 24 November 1983 (age 42) Trondheim, Norway
- Height: 1.80 m (5 ft 11 in)

Sport
- Sport: Skiing
- Club: Granaasen Ski Team

World Cup career
- Seasons: 2001–2019
- Indiv. starts: 269
- Indiv. podiums: 23
- Indiv. wins: 5
Medal record
Men's Nordic combined
Olympic Games
Silver medal – second place	2018 Pyeongchang	Team LH
World Championships
Gold medal – first place	2019 Seefeld	Team NH
Silver medal – second place	2009 Liberec	Individual NH
Silver medal – second place	2019 Seefeld	Individual LH
Silver medal – second place	2019 Seefeld	Team sprint
Bronze medal – third place	2009 Liberec	Team LH
Bronze medal – third place	2011 Oslo	Team NH
Bronze medal – third place	2011 Oslo	Team LH
- Updated on 2 March 2019

Jan Andreas Schmid (born 24 November 1983) is a Norwegian former Nordic combined skier, of Swiss origin. He won two medals at the FIS Nordic World Ski Championships 2009 in Liberec with a silver in the 10 km individual normal hill event and a bronze in the 4 x 5 km team event. Competing two Winter Olympics for Switzerland, he earned his best finish of fourth in the 4 x 5 km team event at Turin in 2006. Schmid also competed in two World Championships for Switzerland. At the 2010 Winter Olympics for Norway, he finished fifth in the 4 x 5 km team event.

== Background ==
Schmid was born in Norway, speaks Norwegian, and has lived in city of Trondheim all of his life. Until 2006 he only had a Swiss passport due to the fact that both of his parents (Rudolf and Ruth Schmid), are Swiss citizens.

== Change of nationality ==
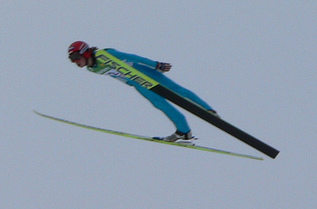

The circumstances of Schmid's transfer from the Swiss to the Norwegian Ski Federation are unusual and were discussed at the International Ski Federation Council meeting in 2006. The Swiss ski federation required that Schmid pay a transfer fee of 120,000 Norwegian kroner (approximately US$23,000) as compensation. Transfer fees of this kind are unheard of in the ski sport. The consequences of not paying the fee would have left Schmid in quarantine for a year. It was also a matter of some urgency for Schmid due to the legal complications that could arise if he did not change his nationality before his 23rd birthday.

== Family ==
Schmid's mother, Ruth Schmid, is the leader of the Nordic combined committee in the Norwegian Ski Federation. Jan's five years younger brother, Tommy Schmid, is currently on the Swiss national ski team. He also has a nine years younger sister, Marit Schmid. Their father, Rudolf, is a ski-trainer in Jan and Tommy's skiteam Sjetne IL. The entire family are active in the sport of orienteering. They are all members of a club called Trollelg Orienteeringclub, which is the local club of southern Trondheim.

== Record ==
=== World Championship ===
Year	Individual NH	Individual LH/ Sprint	Team NH	Team sprint/ Mass start/ Team LH
2003	27	30	-	-
2005	29	32	6	-
2009	2	12	3	13
2011	24	14	3	3
2015	31	31	-	-
2019	2	21	1	2

== World Cup wins ==
Season	Date	Location	Hill
2011–12	10 December 2012	(Austria) Ramsau	HS98 / 10 km
2011–12	3 March 2012	(Finland) Lahti	HS130 / Penalty Race
2017–18	14 January 2018	(Italy) Val di Fiemme	HS134 / 10 km
2017–18	20 January 2018	(France) Chaux-Neuve	HS118 / 10 km
2017–18	4 February 2018	(Japan) Hakuba	HS134 / 10 km
