= Wojciech Marusarz =

Polish Nordic combined skier

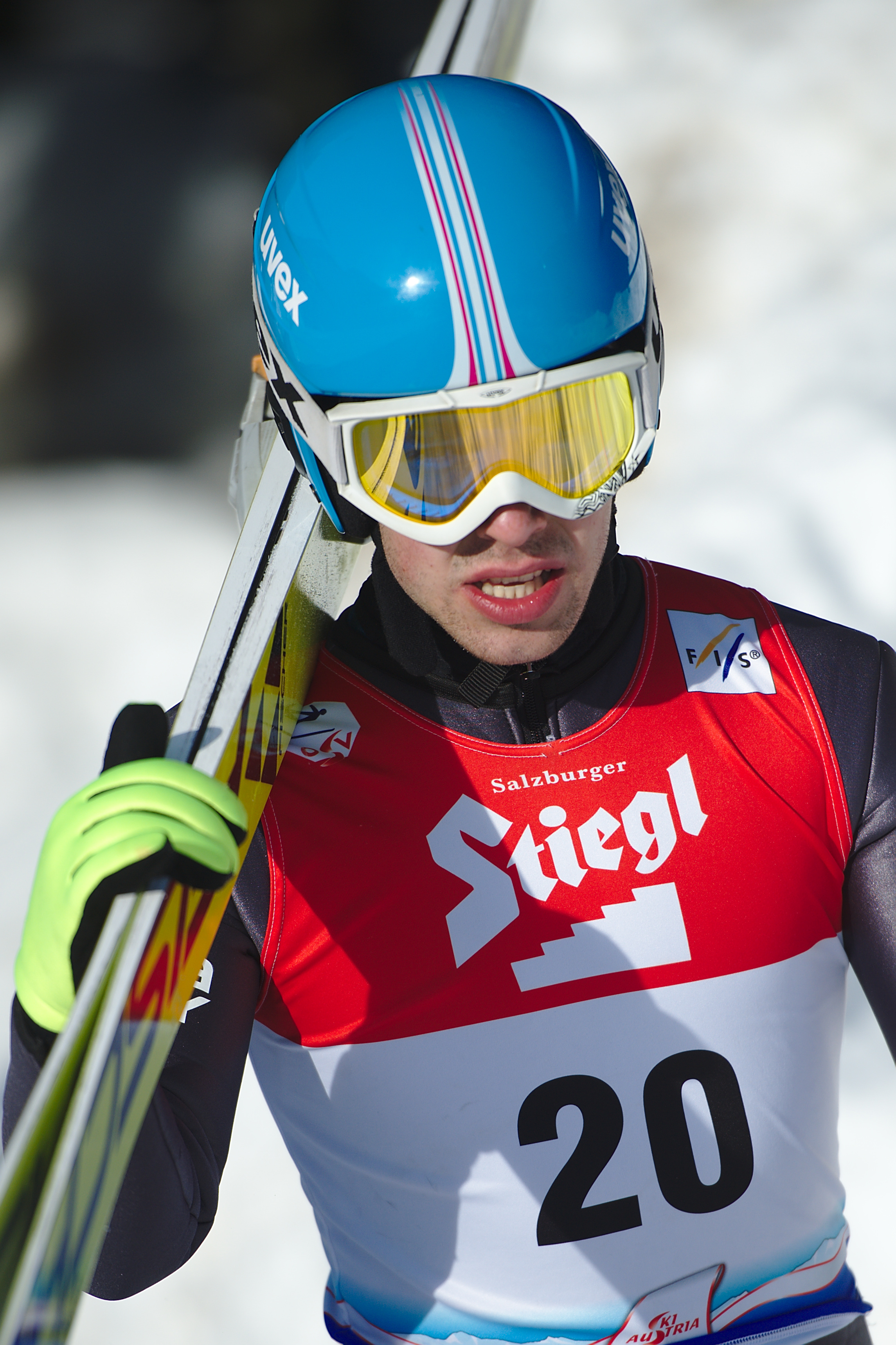
- Marusarz at the FIS Nordic Combined Continental Cup at Eisenerz in 2017
- Country: Poland
- Born: 28 May 1993 (age 31); Zakopane, Poland

World Cup career
- Seasons: 2018-2020
- Indiv. starts: 10

Wojciech Marusarz (born 28 May 1993) is a retired Polish Nordic combined skier. He represented Poland at the 2018 Winter Olympics.
