= Adam Cieślar =

Polish Nordic combined skier

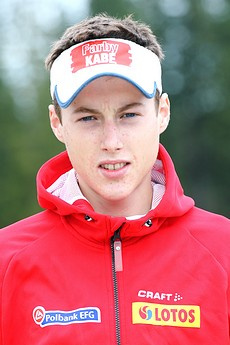

Personal information
- Born: 18 December 1992 (age 33) Cieszyn, Poland

Sport
- Sport: Skiing

World Cup career
- Seasons: 2009-2020
- Indiv. starts: 78
Medal record
Nordic combined
Representing Poland
Winter Universiade
Gold medal – first place	2013 Trentino	10 km individual
Gold medal – first place	2013 Trentino	Team
Gold medal – first place	2015 Štrbské Pleso	10 km individual
Gold medal – first place	2015 Štrbské Pleso	Mass start
Gold medal – first place	2017 Almaty	Mass start
Gold medal – first place	2017 Almaty	Team
Silver medal – second place	2013 Trentino	Mass start
Silver medal – second place	2017 Almaty	10 km individual

Adam Cieślar (born 18 December 1992) is a retired Polish Nordic combined skier. He was born in Cieszyn. He competed at the FIS Nordic World Ski Championships 2011 in Oslo, and at the 2014 Winter Olympics in Sochi.
