= Paweł Słowiok =

Polish Nordic combined skier

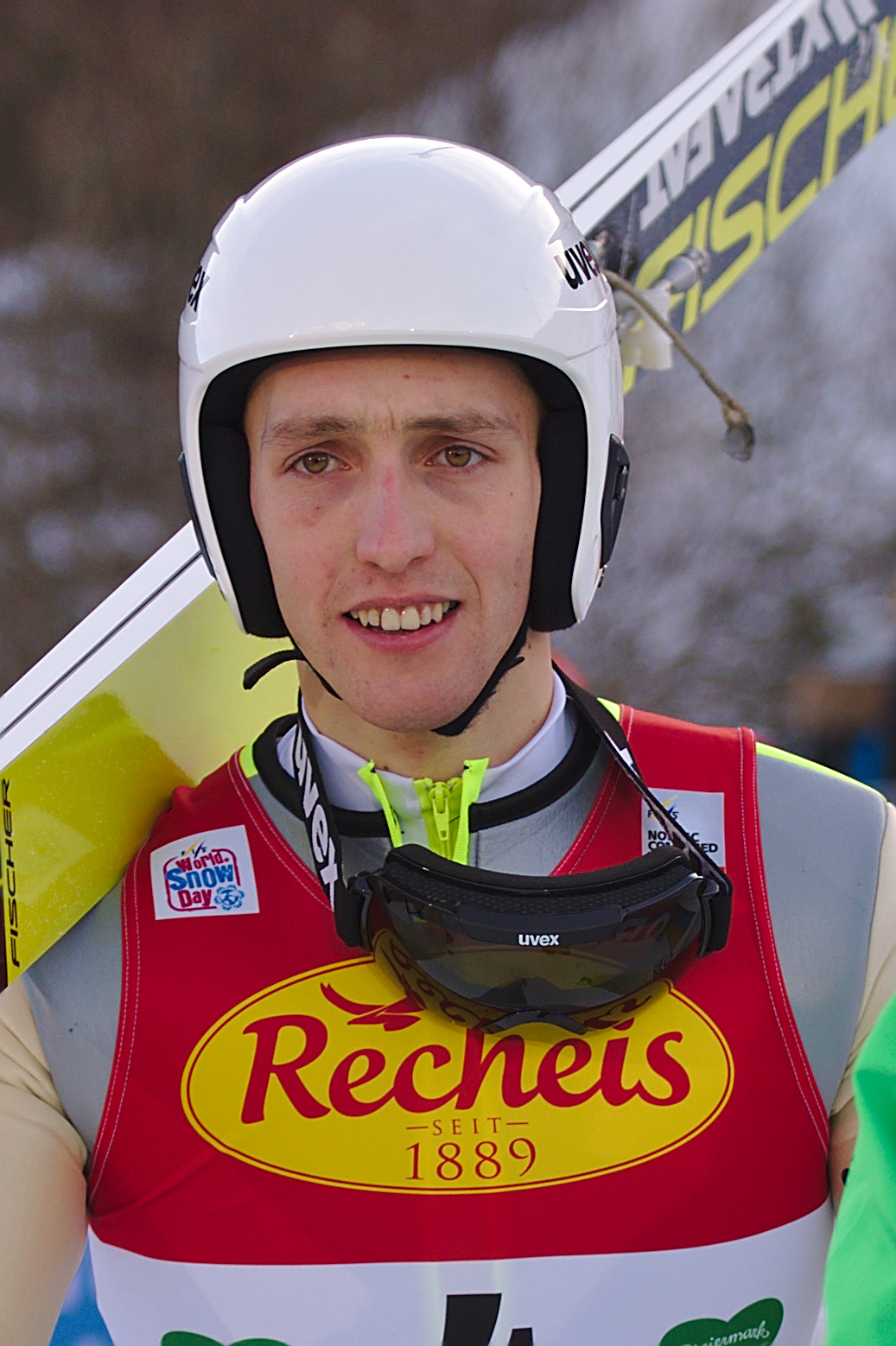

Personal information
- Nationality: Poland
- Born: 31 March 1992 (age 34) Cieszyn

Sport
- Sport: Skiing

World Cup career
- Seasons: 2009-2019
- Indiv. starts: 71

Paweł Słowiok (born March 31, 1992, in Cieszyn, Poland) is a retired Polish Nordic combined skier. He won the Gundersen (2 jumps, 15 km cross country) in the Youth Winter Olympic Festival 2009 in Szczyrk. He did also came at the second place in the Sprint (1 jump, 7,5 km cross country). He has also competed in the World Cup.
