= Szczepan Kupczak =

Polish Nordic combined skier (born 1992)

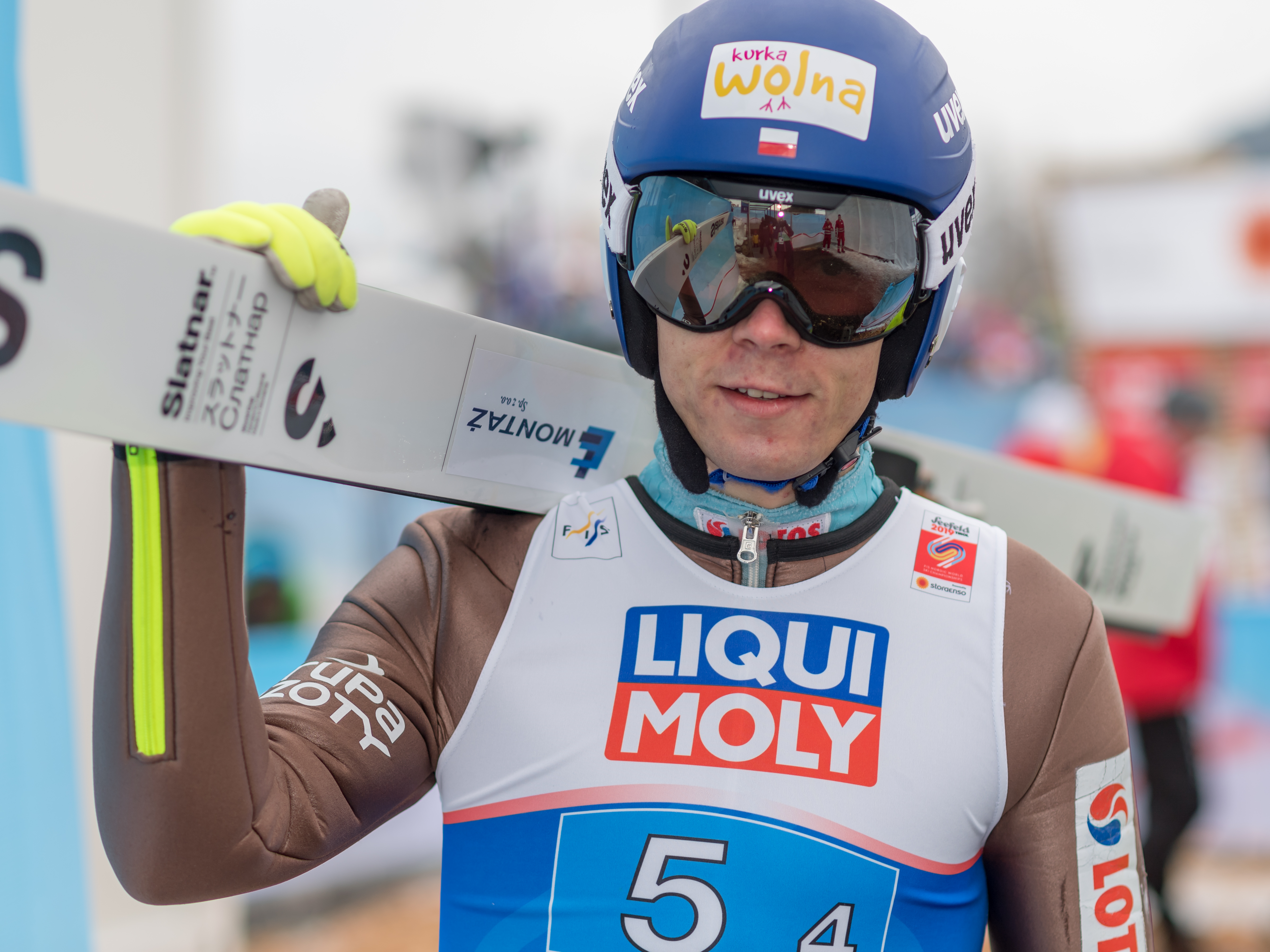
- Kupczak in 2019

Personal information
- Born: 29 November 1992 (age 33) Juszczyna, Poland

Sport
- Country: Poland
- Sport: Nordic combined skiing

Szczepan Kupczak (born 29 November 1992) is a Polish Nordic combined skier who competes internationally.

He represented Poland at the 2018 Winter Olympics.
