= Go Yamamoto =

Japanese Nordic combined skier

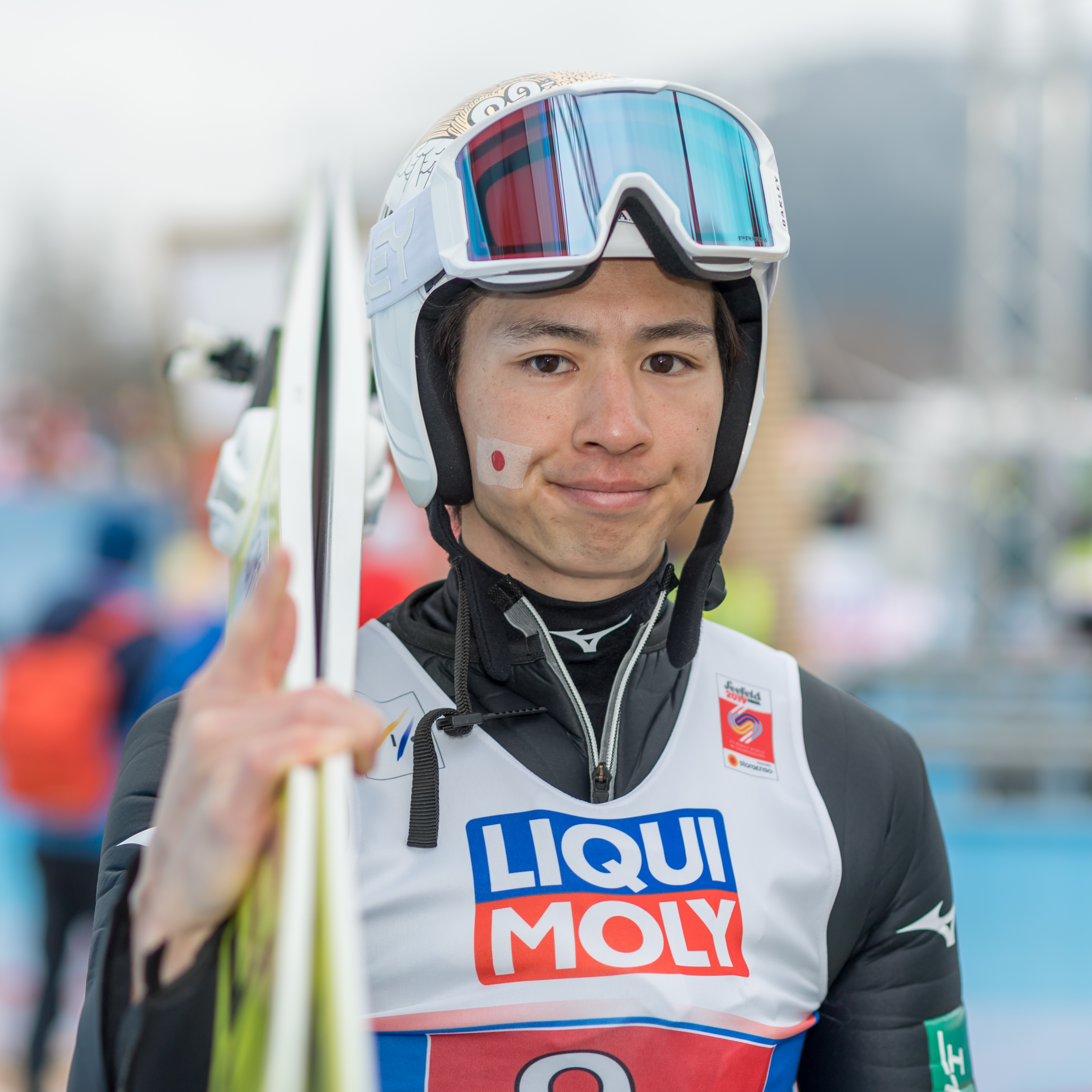

Personal information
- Born: 27 January 1995 (age 31)

Sport
- Country: Japan
- Sport: Nordic combined skiing
Medal record
Men's Nordic combined
Representing Japan
World Championships
Bronze medal – third place	2019 Seefeld	Team NH

Go Yamamoto (Japanese: 山元 豪, Hepburn: Yamamoto Gō; born 27 January 1995) is a Japanese Nordic combined skier who competes internationally.

He competed at the 2018 Winter Olympics.
