= FIS Nordic World Ski Championships 2011 – Individual large hill/10 km =

The Men's Individual large hill/10 km at the FIS Nordic World Ski Championships 2011 was held on 2 March 2011. The ski jumping part of the event took place at 11:00 CET while the cross country part took place at 16:00 CET. Bill Demong of the United States was both the defending world and Olympic champion.

== Results ==
=== Ski jumping ===
Rank	Bib	Athlete	Country	Distance (m)	Points	Time difference
1	45	Haavard Klemetsen	Norway	133.5	127.1	
2	59	Jason Lamy Chappuis	France	133.5	125.5	+0:06
3	42	Wilhelm Denifl	Austria	131.0	123.7	+0:14
4	20	Kaarel Nurmsalu	Estonia	127.5	122.3	+0:19
5	51	Johannes Rydzek	Germany	127.0	118.1	+0:36
6	55	Eric Frenzel	Germany	126.5	117.1	+0:40
7	43	François Braud	France	126.0	116.0	+0:44
8	54	Tino Edelmann	Germany	125.0	113.4	+0:55
9	35	Maxime Laheurte	France	122.0	113.0	+0:56
10	56	Mario Stecher	Austria	123.0	112.4	+0:59
11	34	Tomáš Slavík	Czech Republic	120.5	111.9	+1:01
12	39	Todd Lodwick	United States	123.0	109.2	+1:12
13	46	Sébastien Lacroix	France	122.5	108.6	+1:14
14	44	Janne Ryynänen	Finland	121.0	107.3	+1:19
15	48	Akito Watabe	Japan	119.0	106.2	+1:24
16	47	Lukas Runggaldier	Italy	121.5	106.0	+1:24
17	50	Jan Schmid	Norway	121.0	105.7	+1:26
17	49	Magnus Moan	Norway	123.5	105.7	+1:26
19	26	Gašper Berlot	Slovenia	117.0	103.9	+1:33
20	23	Bill Demong	United States	117.5	103.3	+1:35
21	32	Daito Takahashi	Japan	115.0	102.2	+1:40
22	38	Miroslav Dvořák	Czech Republic	118.5	101.5	+1:42
23	58	Mikko Kokslien	Norway	118.0	100.1	+1:48
24	52	Björn Kircheisen	Germany	115.0	99.9	+1:49
25	37	Ronny Heer	Switzerland	113.0	99.3	+1:51
25	2	Niyaz Nabeev	Russia	116.5	99.3	+1:51
27	53	David Kreiner	Austria	117.0	98.8	+1:53
28	15	Ivan Panin	Russia	116.0	98.7	+1:54
29	9	Marjan Jelenko	Slovenia	113.5	98.3	+1:55
30	28	Hannu Manninen	Finland	116.0	97.0	+2:00
31	30	Taihei Kato	Japan	113.5	96.2	+2:04
31	17	Adam Cieślar	Poland	113.5	96.2	+2:04
33	31	Tim Hug	Switzerland	111.5	94.6	+2:10
34	27	Pavel Churavý	Czech Republic	113.0	93.8	+2:13
35	22	Tomasz Pochwała	Poland	111.0	92.9	+2:17
36	24	Johnny Spillane	United States	110.5	92.7	+2:18
37	25	Yūsuke Minato	Japan	111.5	91.0	+2:24
38	3	Eetu Vähäsöyrinki	Finland	110.0	90.4	+2:26
39	57	Felix Gottwald	Austria	109.5	89.7	+2:30
40	29	Armin Bauer	Italy	107.5	89.4	+2:31
41	36	Bryan Fletcher	United States	110.0	88.2	+2:36
42	1	Kail Piho	Estonia	111.5	88.0	+2:36
43	6	Aleš Vodseďálek	Czech Republic	106.0	87.5	+2:38
44	41	Seppi Hurschler	Switzerland	108.5	87.1	+2:40
45	8	Paweł Słowiok	Poland	111.5	87.0	+2:40
46	14	Jože Kamenik	Slovenia	108.0	86.2	+2:44
47	19	Karl-August Tiirmaa	Estonia	108.5	86.1	+2:44
48	18	Sergej Maslennikov	Russia	105.5	85.5	+2:46
49	40	Alessandro Pittin	Italy	108.5	83.9	+2:53
50	21	Taylor Fletcher	United States	105.5	82.6	+2:58
51	33	Mitja Oranič	Slovenia	101.5	79.8	+3:09
52	10	Giuseppe Michielli	Italy	102.0	78.9	+3:13
53	4	Jim Härtull	Finland	101.0	74.6	+3:30
54	7	Aliaksei Muravitski	Belarus	98.0	72.5	+3:38
55	16	Wesley Savill	Canada	98.0	71.7	+3:42
56	12	Ernest Yahin	Russia	98.0	68.5	+3:54
57	13	Andriy Parkhomchuk	Ukraine	93.0	61.2	+4:24
58	11	Volodymyr Trachuk	Ukraine	91.5	57.1	+4:40
59	5	Han-Hendrik Piho	Estonia	90.5	56.4	+4:43

=== Cross-country skiing ===
Rank	Bib	Athlete	Country	Start time	Cross country time	Cross country rank	Finish time
1st place, gold medalist(s)	2	Jason Lamy Chappuis	France	+0:06	25:25.6	14	25:31.6
2nd place, silver medalist(s)	5	Johannes Rydzek	Germany	+0:36	25:02.3	8	+6.7
3rd place, bronze medalist(s)	6	Eric Frenzel	Germany	+0:40	24:58.6	7	+7.0
4	1	Haavard Klemetsen	Norway	0:00	26:09.2	25	+37.6
5	12	Todd Lodwick	United States	+1:12	24:58.4	6	+38.8
6	20	Bill Demong	United States	+1:35	24:45.9	2	+49.3
7	11	Tomáš Slavík	Czech Republic	+1:01	25:22.5	13	+51.9
8	16	Lukas Runggaldier	Italy	+1:24	25:06.8	9	+59.2
9	7	François Braud	France	+0:44	25:50.3	20	+1:02.7
10	10	Mario Stecher	Austria	+0:59	25:40.9	17	+1:08.3
11	23	Mikko Kokslien	Norway	+1:48	24:56.5	4	+1:12.9
12	27	David Kreiner	Austria	+1:53	24:53.2	3	+1:14.6
13	15	Akito Watabe	Japan	+1:24	25:26.4	15	+1:18.8
14	17	Jan Schmid	Norway	+1:26	25:33.6	16	+1:28.0
15	8	Tino Edelmann	Germany	+0:55	26:13.3	27	+1:36.7
16	30	Hannu Manninen	Finland	+2:00	25:08.5	10	+1:36.9
17	14	Janne Ryynänen	Finland	+1:19	25:52.5	22	+1:39.9
18	39	Felix Gottwald	Austria	+2:30	24:43.4	1	+1:41.8
19	3	Wilhelm Denifl	Austria	+0:14	27:08.2	37	+1:50.6
20	22	Miroslav Dvořák	Czech Republic	+1:42	25:42.8	19	+1:53.2
21	9	Maxime Laheurte	France	+0:56	26:35.3	33	+1:59.7
22	36	Johnny Spillane	United States	+2:18	25:16.1	11	+2:02.5
23	13	Sébastien Lacroix	France	+1:14	26:27.7	29	+2:10.1
24	49	Alessandro Pittin	Italy	+2:53	24:56.9	5	+2:18.3
25	31	Taihei Kato	Japan	+2:04	25:51.1	21	+2:23.5
26	44	Seppi Hurschler	Switzerland	+2:40	25:20.6	12	+2:29.0
27	25	Ronny Heer	Switzerland	+1:51	26:12.3	26	+2:31.7
28	37	Yūsuke Minato	Japan	+2:24	25:41.1	18	+2:33.5
29	19	Gašper Berlot	Slovenia	+1:33	26:34.0	32	+2:35.4
30	41	Bryan Fletcher	United States	+2:36	25:53.2	23	+2:57.6
31	4	Kaarel Nurmsalu	Estonia	+0:19	28:22.7	50	+3:10.1
32	33	Tim Hug	Switzerland	+2:10	26:33.6	31	+3:12.0
33	42	Kail Piho	Estonia	+2:36	26:30.8	30	+3:35.2
34	21	Daito Takahashi	Japan	+1:40	27:30.8	42	+3:39.2
35	50	Taylor Fletcher	United States	+2:58	26:14.8	28	+3:41.2
36	52	Giuseppe Michielli	Italy	+3:13	26:00.3	24	+3:41.7
37	34	Pavel Churavý	Czech Republic	+2:13	27:12.4	38	+3:53.8
38	40	Armin Bauer	Italy	+2:31	26:54.8	35	+3:54.2
39	29	Marjan Jelenko	Slovenia	+1:55	27:41.3	44	+4:04.7
40	47	Karl-August Tiirmaa	Estonia	+2:44	27:20.3	39	+4:32.7
41	46	Jože Kamenik	Slovenia	+2:44	27:25.5	41	+4:37.9
42	45	Paweł Słowiok	Poland	+2:40	27:37.4	43	+4:45.8
43	55	Wesley Savill	Canada	+3:42	26:36.8	34	+4:47.2
44	35	Tomasz Pochwała	Poland	+2:17	28:05.0	45	+4:50.4
45	28	Ivan Panin	Russia	+1:54	28:43.0	52	+5:05.4
46	32	Adam Cieślar	Poland	+2:04	28:41.2	51	+5:13.6
47	38	Eetu Vähäsöyrinki	Finland	+2:27	28:21.8	49	+5:17.2
48	48	Sergej Maslennikov	Russia	+2:46	28:12.6	47	+5:27.0
49	26	Niyaz Nabeev	Russia	+1:51	29:15.4	53	+5:34.8
50	59	Han-Hendrik Piho	Estonia	+4:43	27:04.0	36	+6:15.4
51	53	Jim Härtull	Finland	+3:30	28:17.6	48	+6:16.0
52	58	Volodymyr Trachuk	Ukraine	+4:40	27:20.5	40	+6:28.9
53	56	Ernest Yahin	Russia	+3:54	28:08.1	46	+6:30.5
54	54	Aliaksei Muravitski	Belarus	+3:38	LAP	54	
	57	Andriy Parkhomchuk	Ukraine	+4:24	DNF		
	18	Magnus Moan	Norway	+1:26	DNS		
	24	Björn Kircheisen	Germany	+1:49	DNS		
	43	Aleš Vodseďálek	Czech Republic	+2:38	DNS		
	51	Mitja Oranič	Slovenia	+3:09	DNS		
