= FIS Nordic World Ski Championships 2011 – Individual normal hill/10 km =

The Men's Individual normal hill/10 km at the FIS Nordic World Ski Championships 2011 was held on 26 February 2011. The ski jumping part of the event took place at 10:00 CET with the cross-country part took place at 13:00 CET. Todd Lodwick of the United States was the defending world champion while France's Jason Lamy Chappuis was the defending Olympic champion.

== Results ==
=== Ski jumping ===
Rank	Bib	Athlete	Country	Distance (m)	Points	Time difference
1	55	Eric Frenzel	Germany	109.5	131.8	
2	45	Haavard Klemetsen	Norway	104.0	127.1	+0:19
3	59	Jason Lamy Chappuis	France	102.5	123.9	+0:32
4	35	Maxime Laheurte	France	102.0	123.1	+0:35
5	43	François Braud	France	101.0	121.6	+0:41
6	54	Tino Edelmann	Germany	103.0	120.9	+0:44
7	12	Marjan Jelenko	Slovenia	102.0	119.2	+0:50
8	50	Jan Schmid	Norway	100.5	119.1	+0:51
9	51	Johannes Rydzek	Germany	97.5	118.1	+0:55
10	36	Bryan Fletcher	United States	98.5	116.7	+1:00
11	44	Janne Ryynänen	Finland	99.0	116.5	+1:01
12	34	Tomáš Slavík	Czech Republic	99.5	115.5	+1:05
13	48	Akito Watabe	Japan	99.0	114.1	+1:11
14	27	Gašper Berlot	Slovenia	99.0	114.0	+1:11
15	57	Felix Gottwald	Austria	98.0	113.7	+1:12
16	39	Todd Lodwick	United States	97.0	113.5	+1:13
17	46	Sébastien Lacroix	France	98.5	113.3	+1:14
17	42	Wilhelm Denifl	Austria	96.5	113.3	+1:14
19	47	Lukas Runggaldier	Italy	99.5	112.6	+1:17
20	56	Mario Stecher	Austria	98.0	112.5	+1:17
21	21	Kaarel Nurmsalu	Estonia	97.5	112.5	+1:17
22	53	David Kreiner	Austria	97.0	111.8	+1:20
23	49	Magnus Moan	Norway	97.5	111.4	+1:22
24	58	Mikko Kokslien	Norway	96.5	111.2	+1:22
25	5	Adam Cieślar	Poland	97.5	111.0	+1:23
26	14	Niyaz Nabeev	Russia	98.0	108.9	+1:32
27	52	Björn Kircheisen	Germany	95.0	106.8	+1:40
28	38	Miroslav Dvořák	Czech Republic	96.5	105.2	+1:46
29	24	Bill Demong	United States	93.0	105.1	+1:47
30	29	Hannu Manninen	Finland	95.0	104.2	+1:50
31	33	Mitja Oranič	Slovenia	92.0	102.2	+1:58
32	37	Ronny Heer	Switzerland	92.0	101.3	+2:02
33	7	Aleš Vodseďálek	Czech Republic	94.0	100.6	+2:05
34	25	Johnny Spillane	United States	91.5	100.5	+2:05
35	40	Alessandro Pittin	Italy	92.0	98.8	+2:12
36	13	Paweł Słowiok	Poland	93.0	97.3	+2:18
37	32	Daito Takahashi	Japan	91.0	97.2	+2:18
38	17	Karl-August Tiirmaa	Estonia	90.5	96.5	+2:21
39	22	Taylor Fletcher	United States	91.5	95.5	+2:25
40	28	Pavel Churavý	Czech Republic	90.0	94.2	+2:30
41	4	Sergej Maslennikov	Russia	89.0	94.0	+2:31
42	15	Joni Karjalainen	Finland	91.5	93.3	+2:34
43	26	Yūsuke Minato	Japan	88.0	92.9	+2:36
44	11	Eetu Vähäsöyrinki	Finland	89.5	92.7	+2:36
45	10	Kail Piho	Estonia	90.5	92.3	+2:38
46	20	Giuseppe Michielli	Italy	88.0	89.9	+2:48
47	31	Norihito Kobayashi	Japan	87.5	89.4	+2:50
48	41	Seppi Hurschler	Switzerland	86.0	88.7	+2:52
49	19	Aldo Leetoja	Estonia	86.0	86.0	+3:03
50	2	Ivan Panin	Russia	85.0	82.8	+3:16
51	3	Wesley Savill	Canada	86.0	82.3	+3:18
52	18	Jože Kamenik	Slovenia	83.0	81.0	+3:23
53	30	Samuel Costa	Italy	83.5	78.7	+3:32
54	23	Tomasz Pochwała	Poland	81.5	77.8	+3:36
55	9	Volodymyr Trachuk	Ukraine	81.5	74.0	+3:51
56	16	Ernest Yahin	Russia	79.5	69.3	+4:10
57	1	Andriy Parkhomchuk	Ukraine	77.0	62.2	+4:38
58	8	James Lambert	Great Britain	57.0	17.0	+7:39
	6	Aliaksei Muravitski	Belarus		DSQ	

=== Cross-country skiing ===
Rank	Bib	Athlete	Country	Start time	Cross country time	Cross country rank	Finish time
1st place, gold medalist(s)	1	Eric Frenzel	Germany	0:00	25:19.2	19	25:19.2
2nd place, silver medalist(s)	6	Tino Edelmann	Germany	+0:44	24:47.1	7	+11.9
3rd place, bronze medalist(s)	15	Felix Gottwald	Austria	+1:12	24:25.6	2	+18.4
4	9	Johannes Rydzek	Germany	+0:55	24:47.1	7	+22.9
5	13	Akito Watabe	Japan	+1:11	24:33.7	4	+25.5
6	24	Mikko Kokslien	Norway	+1:22	24:26.8	3	+29.6
7	29	Bill Demong	United States	+1:47	24:18.4	1	+46.2
8	16	Todd Lodwick	United States	+1:13	24:53.1	10	+46.9
9	19	Lukas Runggaldier	Italy	+1:17	24:49.2	9	+47.0
10	2	Haavard Klemetsen	Norway	+0:19	25:47.2	25	+47.0
11	12	Tomáš Slavík	Czech Republic	+1:05	25:03.2	15	+49.0
12	22	David Kreiner	Austria	+1:20	24:58.0	11	+58.8
13	18	Wilhelm Denifl	Austria	+1:14	25:04.6	16	+59.4
14	23	Magnus Moan	Norway	+1:22	24:59.9	12	+1:02.7
15	3	Jason Lamy Chappuis	France	+0:32	25:50.5	28	+1:03.3
16	4	Maxime Laheurte	France	+0:35	25:49.1	26	+1:04.9
17	35	Alessandro Pittin	Italy	+2:12	24:38.5	5	+1:31.3
18	11	Janne Ryynänen	Finland	+1:01	25:50.1	27	+1:31.9
19	34	Johnny Spillane	United States	+2:05	24:46.5	6	+1:32.3
20	5	François Braud	France	+0:41	26:11.2	32	+1:33.0
21	30	Hannu Manninen	Finland	+1:50	25:13.8	18	+1:44.6
22	10	Bryan Fletcher	United States	+1:00	26:09.0	31	+1:49.8
23	28	Miroslav Dvořák	Czech Republic	+1:46	25:29.3	21	+1:56.1
24	8	Jan Schmid	Norway	+0:51	26:36.1	37	+2:07.9
25	32	Ronny Heer	Switzerland	+2:02	25:31.2	22	+2:14.0
26	39	Taylor Fletcher	United States	+2:25	25:09.3	17	+2:15.1
27	7	Marjan Jelenko	Slovenia	+0:50	26:47.7	41	+2:18.5
28	27	Björn Kircheisen	Germany	+1:40	25:58.4	30	+2:19.2
29	20	Mario Stecher	Austria	+1:17	26:22.4	33	+2:20.2
30	17	Sébastien Lacroix	France	+1:14	26:32.2	36	+2:27.0
31	46	Giuseppe Michielli	Italy	+2:48	25:00.1	13	+2:28.9
32	48	Seppi Hurschler	Switzerland	+2:52	25:02.1	14	+2:34.9
33	43	Yūsuke Minato	Japan	+2:36	25:20.8	20	+2:37.6
34	45	Kail Piho	Estonia	+2:38	25:33.6	23	+2:52.4
35	47	Norihito Kobayashi	Japan	+2:50	25:34.1	24	+3:04.9
36	31	Mitja Oranič	Slovenia	+1:58	26:31.6	35	+3:10.4
37	14	Gašper Berlot	Slovenia	+1:11	27:33.0	47	+3:24.8
38	42	Joni Karjalainen	Finland	+2:34	26:24.9	34	+3:39.7
39	33	Aleš Vodseďálek	Czech Republic	+2:05	27:03.8	43	+3:49.6
40	26	Niyaz Nabeev	Russia	+1:32	26:43.7	40	+3:56.5
41	51	Wesley Savill	Canada	+3:18	25:58.2	29	+3:57.0
42	25	Adam Cieślar	Poland	+1:23	28:00.2	52	+4:04.0
43	41	Sergej Maslennikov	Russia	+2:31	26:58.5	42	+4:10.3
44	38	Karl-August Tiirmaa	Estonia	+2:21	27:21.8	45	+4:23.6
45	37	Daito Takahashi	Japan	+2:18	27:30.0	46	+4:28.8
46	44	Eetu Vähäsöyrinki	Finland	+2:36	27:18.9	44	+4:35.7
47	53	Samuel Costa	Italy	+3:32	26:37.0	38	+4:49.8
48	36	Paweł Słowiok	Poland	+2:18	28:08.9	54	+5:07.7
49	55	Volodymyr Trachuk	Ukraine	+3:51	26:37.0	38	+5:08.8
50	50	Ivan Panin	Russia	+3:16	27:33.0	47	+5:29.8
51	49	Aldo Leetoja	Estonia	+3:03	27:53.6	51	+5:37.4
52	54	Tomasz Pochwała	Poland	+3:36	27:46.3	50	+6:03.1
53	56	Ernest Yahin	Russia	+4:10	27:45.7	49	+6:36.5
54	52	Jože Kamenik	Slovenia	+3:23	29:08.8	55	+7:12.6
55	57	Andriy Parkhomchuk	Ukraine	+4:38	28:04.1	53	+7:22.9
	58	James Lambert	Great Britain	+7:39			DNF
	21	Kaarel Nurmsalu	Estonia	+1:17			DNS
	40	Pavel Churavý	Czech Republic	+2:30			DNS
