= FIS Nordic World Ski Championships 2013 – Individual large hill/10 km =

Individual large hill/10 km at the FIS Nordic World Ski Championships 2013
- Date: 28 February 2013
- Competitors: 55 from 16 nations
- Winning time: 27:22.8

Medalists
gold medal	Eric Frenzel	Germany
silver medal	Bernhard Gruber	Austria
bronze medal	Jason Lamy-Chappuis	France

The Men's Individual large hill/10 km at the FIS Nordic World Ski Championships 2013 was held on 28 February 2013. The ski jumping part of the event took place at 10:00 and the cross-country part at 15:00.

== Results ==
=== Ski jumping ===
The ski jumping was held at 10:00.

Rank	Bib	Athlete	Country	Distance (m)	Points	Time difference
1	55	Eric Frenzel	Germany	138.5	144.1	
2	42	Christoph Bieler	Austria	135.5	140.7	+14.0
3	33	Yoshito Watabe	Japan	131.5	137.8	+25.0
4	39	Håvard Klemetsen	Norway	135.0	137.7	+26.0
5	38	Taihei Kato	Japan	132.5	136.6	+30.0
6	53	Bernhard Gruber	Austria	136.0	135.9	+33.0
7	45	Wilhelm Denifl	Austria	135.5	135.4	+35.0
8	51	Akito Watabe	Japan	136.0	134.9	+37.0
9	41	Marjan Jelenko	Slovenia	130.5	130.8	+53.0
10	54	Jason Lamy-Chappuis	France	126.5	127.0	+1:08.0
11	52	Magnus Moan	Norway	134.5	126.6	+1:10.0
12	36	Hideaki Nagai	Japan	129.5	126.4	+1:11.0
13	46	Sébastien Lacroix	France	126.5	123.4	+1:23.0
14	47	Miroslav Dvořák	Czech Republic	125.0	120.2	+1:36.0
15	44	Johannes Rydzek	Germany	125.0	119.8	+1:37.0
16	25	Janne Ryynänen	Finland	119.5	119.2	+1:40.0
17	48	Björn Kircheisen	Germany	126.5	118.5	+1:42.0
18	49	Mikko Kokslien	Norway	126.0	118.0	+1:44.0
19	43	Magnus Krog	Norway	122.0	117.2	+1:48.0
20	35	François Braud	France	118.5	115.8	+1:53.0
21	34	Mario Stecher	Austria	118.5	115.5	+1:54.0
22	31	Tomáš Slavík	Czech Republic	116.0	112.7	+2:06.0
23	17	Gašper Berlot	Slovenia	117.0	112.5	+2:06.0
24	37	Bryan Fletcher	United States	116.0	112.2	+2:08.0
25	29	Bill Demong	United States	116.0	112.0	+2:08.0
26	22	Ilkka Herola	Finland	118.0	111.6	+2:10.0
27	40	Taylor Fletcher	United States	119.5	111.3	+2:11.0
28	32	Maxime Laheurte	France	115.5	110.3	+2:15.0
29	10	Kristjan Ilves	Estonia	115.0	108.3	+2:23.0
30	20	Eetu Vähäsöyrinki	Finland	112.0	106.5	+2:30.0
31	30	Pavel Churavý	Czech Republic	113.5	106.2	+2:32.0
32	2	Mikke Leinonen	Finland	113.0	105.7	+2:34.0
33	27	Tim Hug	Switzerland	111.5	104.0	+2:40.0
34	50	Tino Edelmann	Germany	132.5	103.4	+2:43.0
34	28	Kail Piho	Estonia	111.5	103.4	+2:43.0
36	13	Vitaliy Kalinichenko	Ukraine	113.5	103.3	+2:43.0
37	9	Evgeniy Klimov	Russia	111.0	102.2	+2:48.0
38	26	Mitja Oranič	Slovenia	110.0	101.6	+2:50.0
39	14	Giuseppe Michielli	Italy	110.0	101.3	+2:51.0
40	24	Alessandro Pittin	Italy	108.5	99.8	+2:57.0
40	23	Geoffrey Lafarge	France	109.0	99.8	+2:57.0
42	7	Viktor Pasichnyk	Ukraine	108.0	96.5	+3:10.0
43	19	Johnny Spillane	United States	107.5	96.2	+3:12.0
44	8	Samuel Costa	Italy	107.5	95.6	+3:14.0
45	6	Ivan Panin	Russia	106.0	93.1	+3:24.0
46	3	Karl-August Tiirmaa	Estonia	106.0	92.7	+3:26.0
47	4	Ernest Yahin	Russia	105.0	92.3	+3:28.0
48	12	Tomáš Portýk	Czech Republic	106.0	92.0	+3:28.0
49	21	Seppi Hürschler	Switzerland	102.5	87.9	+3:45.0
50	18	Armin Bauer	Italy	100.0	85.2	+3:56.0
50	16	Han-Hendrik Piho	Estonia	101.5	85.2	+3:56.0
52	15	Denis Isaykin	Russia	101.5	84.6	+3:58.0
53	11	Sergej Sharabayev	Kazakhstan	100.5	82.7	+4:06.0
53	5	Jože Kamenik	Slovenia	100.0	82.7	+4:06.0
55	1	Uladzimir Kudrevich	Belarus	85.0	53.7	+6:02.0

=== Cross-country skiing ===
The cross-country skiing part was started at 15:30.

Rank	Bib	Athlete	Country	Start time	Cross country time	Cross country rank	Finish time
1st place, gold medalist(s)	1	Eric Frenzel	Germany	0:00	27:22.8	14	27:22.8
2nd place, silver medalist(s)	6	Bernhard Gruber	Austria	0:33	27:26.5	16	+36.7
3rd place, bronze medalist(s)	10	Jason Lamy-Chappuis	France	1:08	26:52.0	4	+37.2
4	8	Akito Watabe	Japan	0:37	27:24.2	15	+38.4
5	12	Hideaki Nagai	Japan	1:11	26:54.1	7	+42.3
6	7	Wilhelm Denifl	Austria	0:35	27:35.5	19	+47.7
7	13	Sébastien Lacroix	France	1:23	26:50.6	3	+50.8
8	11	Magnus Moan	Norway	1:10	27:10.5	11	+57.7
9	4	Håvard Klemetsen	Norway	0:26	27:55.0	22	+58.2
10	15	Johannes Rydzek	Germany	1:37	26:53.5	6	+1:07.7
11	18	Mikko Kokslien	Norway	1:44	26:52.9	5	+1:14.1
12	3	Yoshito Watabe	Japan	0:25	28:12.4	29	+1:14.6
13	5	Taihei Kato	Japan	0:30	28:13.0	30	+1:20.2
14	17	Björn Kircheisen	Germany	1:42	27:05.3	9	+1:24.5
15	25	Bill Demong	United States	2:08	26:41.0	1	+1:26.2
16	2	Christoph Bieler	Austria	0:14	28:36.9	34	+1:28.1
17	27	Taylor Fletcher	United States	2:11	26:50.1	2	+1:38.3
18	19	Magnus Krog	Norway	1:48	27:14.8	12	+1:40.0
19	20	François Braud	France	1:53	27:31.9	17	+2:02.1
20	14	Miroslav Dvořák	Czech Republic	1:36	28:01.3	25	+2:14.5
21	21	Mario Stecher	Austria	1:54	28:07.9	28	+2:39.1
22	26	Ilkka Herola	Finland	2:10	27:52.3	21	+2:39.5
23	24	Bryan Fletcher	United States	2:08	27:55.4	23	+2:40.6
24	40	Alessandro Pittin	Italy	2:57	27:07.8	10	+2:42.0
25	28	Maxime Laheurte	France	2:15	27:56.7	24	+2:48.9
26	16	Janne Ryynänen	Finland	1:40	28:41.9	35	+2:59.1
27	35	Kail Piho	Estonia	2:43	27:42.5	20	+3:02.7
28	41	Geoffrey Lafarge	France	2:57	27:32.9	18	+3:07.1
29	22	Tomáš Slavík	Czech Republic	2:06	28:25.0	33	+3:08.2
30	43	Johnny Spillane	United States	3:12	27:20.5	13	+3:09.7
31	39	Giuseppe Michielli	Italy	2:51	28:02.1	26	+3:30.3
32	31	Pavel Churavý	Czech Republic	2:32	28:21.2	32	+3:30.4
33	33	Tim Hug	Switzerland	2:40	28:15.4	31	+3:32.6
34	50	Armin Bauer	Italy	3:56	27:03.3	8	+3:36.5
35	42	Viktor Pasichnyk	Ukraine	3:10	28:02.4	27	+3:49.6
36	32	Mikke Leinonen	Finland	2:34	28:45.3	36	+3:56.5
37	30	Eetu Vähäsöyrinki	Finland	2:30	28:50.6	37	+3:57.8
38	44	Samuel Costa	Italy	3:14	28:53.0	38	+4:44.2
39	29	Kristjan Ilves	Estonia	2:23	30:09.3	42	+5:09.5
40	23	Gašper Berlot	Slovenia	2:06	30:41.3	46	+5:24.5
41	47	Ernest Yahin	Russia	3:27	29:55.4	41	+5:59.6
42	52	Denis Isaykin	Russia	3:58	29:40.2	39	+6:15.4
43	51	Han-Hendrik Piho	Estonia	3:56	29:45.0	40	+6:18.2
44	45	Ivan Panin	Russia	3:24	30:17.0	44	+6:18.2
45	46	Karl-August Tiirmaa	Estonia	3:26	30:24.9	45	+6:28.1
46	49	Seppi Hürschler	Switzerland	3:45	30:12.4	43	+6:34.6
47	36	Vitaliy Kalinichenko	Ukraine	2:43	31:37.4	48	+6:57.6
48	54	Jože Kamenik	Slovenia	4:06	30:41.5	47	+7:24.7
	37	Evgeniy Klimov	Russia	2:48	LAP		
	55	Uladzimir Kudrevich	Belarus	6:02	LAP		
	9	Marjan Jelenko	Slovenia	0:53	DNF		
	38	Mitja Oranič	Slovenia	2:50	DNF		
	53	Sergej Sharabayev	Kazakhstan	4:06	DNF		
	34	Tino Edelmann	Germany	2:43	DNS		
	48	Tomáš Portýk	Czech Republic	3:28	DNS		
