= FIS Nordic World Ski Championships 2013 – Individual normal hill/10 km =

Individual normal hill/10 km at the FIS Nordic World Ski Championships 2013
- Date: 22 February 2013
- Competitors: 55 from 17 nations
- Winning time: 29:13.2

Medalists
gold medal	Jason Lamy-Chappuis	France
silver medal	Mario Stecher	Austria
bronze medal	Björn Kircheisen	Germany

The Men's Individual normal hill/10 km at the FIS Nordic World Ski Championships 2013 was held on 22 February 2013. The ski jumping part of the event took place at 10:00 with the cross-country part at 15:00.

== Results ==
=== Ski jumping ===
The ski jumping part was held at 10:00.

Rank	Bib	Athlete	Country	Distance (m)	Points	Time difference
1	40	Håvard Klemetsen	Norway	103.5	125.6	
2	34	Mario Stecher	Austria	106.0	121.7	+0:16
3	43	Christoph Bieler	Austria	101.5	121.4	+0:17
4	42	Marjan Jelenko	Slovenia	104.0	120.0	+0:22
5	38	Taihei Kato	Japan	101.0	116.4	+0:37
6	55	Eric Frenzel	Germany	99.5	115.4	+0:41
7	33	Yoshito Watabe	Japan	97.0	109.8	+1:03
8	52	Magnus Moan	Norway	98.5	109.5	+1:04
9	46	Wilhelm Denifl	Austria	96.0	108.8	+1:07
10	53	Bernhard Gruber	Austria	96.5	108.1	+1:10
11	54	Jason Lamy-Chappuis	France	94.5	107.3	+1:13
12	49	Björn Kircheisen	Germany	95.5	104.7	+1:24
13	3	Vitaliy Kalinichenko	Ukraine	96.5	103.8	+1:27
14	51	Akito Watabe	Japan	95.0	103.4	+1:29
15	31	Maxime Laheurte	France	97.5	102.3	+1:33
15	29	Pavel Churavý	Czech Republic	96.0	102.3	+1:33
17	36	Hideaki Nagai	Japan	96.0	101.9	+1:35
18	32	Fabian Rießle	Germany	98.0	101.8	+1:35
19	37	Bryan Fletcher	United States	92.5	100.4	+1:41
20	50	Tino Edelmann	Germany	91.0	100.3	+1:41
21	23	Janne Ryynänen	Finland	95.0	98.6	+1:48
22	45	Johannes Rydzek	Germany	89.0	98.2	+1:50
23	11	Ernest Yahin	Russia	94.0	97.8	+1:51
24	35	François Braud	France	91.5	96.5	+1:56
25	12	Patrik Lichý	Slovakia	93.0	96.3	+1:57
26	21	Ilkka Herola	Finland	94.5	96.2	+1:58
27	16	Niyaz Nabeev	Russia	93.5	95.3	+2:01
28	17	Han-Hendrik Piho	Estonia	92.5	94.3	+2:05
29	44	Magnus Krog	Norway	90.5	93.5	+2:08
29	26	Kail Piho	Estonia	94.0	93.5	+2:08
31	47	Sébastien Lacroix	France	89.0	92.6	+2:12
32	20	Todd Lodwick	United States	92.5	92.5	+2:12
33	15	Mikke Leinonen	Finland	90.5	91.4	+2:17
34	24	Mitja Oranič	Slovenia	92.0	90.5	+2:20
35	8	Petr Kutal	Czech Republic	89.0	88.4	+2:29
36	25	Tim Hug	Switzerland	92.0	88.2	+2:30
37	30	Tomáš Slavík	Czech Republic	90.5	87.9	+2:31
37	13	Kristjan Ilves	Estonia	90.0	87.9	+2:31
39	18	Gašper Berlot	Slovenia	89.0	87.8	+2:31
40	9	Giuseppe Michielli	Italy	89.5	86.4	+2:37
41	22	Alessandro Pittin	Italy	90.0	85.8	+2:39
42	19	Armin Bauer	Italy	90.5	85.2	+2:42
43	48	Miroslav Dvořák	Czech Republic	84.5	84.8	+2:43
44	10	Viktor Pasichnyk	Ukraine	88.0	84.7	+2:44
45	41	Taylor Fletcher	United States	85.5	83.9	+2:47
46	6	Matic Plaznik	Slovenia	86.5	83.2	+2:50
47	28	Bill Demong	United States	86.5	82.1	+2:54
48	2	Ivan Panin	Russia	87.5	82.0	+2:54
49	39	Jørgen Gråbak	Norway	82.5	78.6	+3:08
50	27	Lukas Runggaldier	Italy	84.0	77.6	+3:12
51	1	Karl-August Tiirmaa	Estonia	83.0	74.4	+3:25
52	14	Jim Härtull	Finland	81.0	69.7	+3:44
53	4	Denis Isaykin	Russia	80.0	69.0	+3:46
54	7	Sergej Sharabayev	Kazakhstan	77.5	59.6	+4:24
55	5	Uladzimir Kudrevich	Belarus	72.5	42.6	+5:32

=== Cross-country skiing ===
The cross-country skiing part was held at 15:00.

Rank	Bib	Athlete	Country	Start time	Cross country time	Cross country rank	Finish time
1st place, gold medalist(s)	11	Jason Lamy-Chappuis	France	1:13	28:00.2	5	29:13.2
2nd place, silver medalist(s)	2	Mario Stecher	Austria	0:16	28:57.4	17	+0.2
3rd place, bronze medalist(s)	12	Björn Kircheisen	Germany	1:24	28:11.5	9	+0.3
4	6	Eric Frenzel	Germany	0:41	28:32.7	12	+0.5
5	1	Håvard Klemetsen	Norway	0:00	29:29.4	35	+16.2
6	5	Taihei Kato	Japan	0:37	29:00.9	18	+24.7
7	4	Marjan Jelenko	Slovenia	0:22	29:23.5	29	+32.3
8	3	Christoph Bieler	Austria	0:17	29:31.7	36	+35.5
9	14	Akito Watabe	Japan	1:29	28:20.2	10	+36.0
10	29	Magnus Krog	Norway	2:08	27:52.6	3	+47.4
11	31	Sébastien Lacroix	France	2:12	27:52.8	4	+51.6
12	16	Pavel Churavý	Czech Republic	1:33	28:35.9	14	+55.7
13	10	Bernhard Gruber	Austria	1:10	29:04.2	22	+1:01.0
14	19	Bryan Fletcher	United States	1:41	28:33.4	13	+1:01.2
15	15	Maxime Laheurte	France	1:33	28:42.6	15	+1:02.4
16	7	Yoshito Watabe	Japan	1:03	29:23.9	31	+1:13.7
17	8	Magnus Moan	Norway	1:04	29:26.0	32	+1:16.8
18	17	Hideaki Nagai	Japan	1:35	29:02.0	20	+1:23.8
19	41	Alessandro Pittin	Italy	2:39	28:03.6	7	+1:29.6
20	9	Wilhelm Denifl	Austria	1:07	29:40.1	40	+1:29.9
21	20	Tino Edelmann	Germany	1:41	29:02.8	21	+1:30.6
22	42	Armin Bauer	Italy	2:42	28:02.1	6	+1:30.9
23	47	Bill Demong	United States	2:54	27:50.8	2	+1:31.6
24	18	Fabian Rießle	Germany	1:35	29:11.6	26	+1:33.4
25	45	Taylor Fletcher	United States	2:47	28:04.7	8	+1:38.5
26	50	Lukas Runggaldier	Italy	3:12	27:48.4	1	+1:47.2
27	26	Ilkka Herola	Finland	1:58	29:11.1	25	+1:55.9
28	30	Kail Piho	Estonia	2:08	29:01.4	19	+1:56.2
29	21	Janne Ryynänen	Finland	1:48	29:36.1	38	+2:10.9
30	22	Johannes Rydzek	Germany	1:50	29:34.9	37	+2:11.7
31	40	Giuseppe Michielli	Italy	2:37	28:49.5	16	+2:13.3
32	34	Mitja Oranič	Slovenia	2:20	29:10.0	24	+2:16.8
33	28	Han-Hendrik Piho	Estonia	2:05	29:26.7	33	+2:18.5
34	33	Mikke Leinonen	Finland	2:17	29:16.8	28	+2:20.6
35	32	Todd Lodwick	United States	2:12	29:23.6	30	+2:22.4
36	24	François Braud	France	1:56	29:40.4	41	+2:23.2
37	37	Tomáš Slavík	Czech Republic	2:31	29:06.4	23	+2:24.2
38	49	Jørgan Gråbak	Norway	3:08	28:31.4	11	+2:26.2
39	36	Tim Hug	Switzerland	2:30	29:15.6	27	+2:32.4
40	44	Viktor Pasichnyk	Ukraine	2:44	29:28.1	34	+2:58.9
41	43	Miroslav Dvořák	Czech Republic	2:43	29:39.9	39	+3:09.7
42	23	Ernest Yahin	Russia	1:51	30:45.4	46	+3:23.2
43	35	Petr Kutal	Czech Republic	2:29	30:26.7	44	+3:42.5
44	39	Gašper Berlot	Slovenia	2:31	30:30.6	45	+3:48.4
45	48	Ivan Panin	Russia	2:54	30:13.7	43	+3:54.5
46	53	Denis Isaykin	Russia	3:46	30:02.7	42	+4:35.5
47	46	Matic Plaznik	Slovenia	2:50	31:11.7	48	+4:48.5
48	38	Kristjan Ilves	Estonia	2:31	31:37.4	49	+4:55.2
49	27	Niyaz Nabeev	Russia	2:01	32:13.7	50	+5:01.5
50	52	Jim Härtull	Finland	3:44	30:52.3	47	+5:23.1
51	13	Vitaliy Kalinichenko	Ukraine	1:27	33:43.6	53	+5:57.4
52	51	Karl-August Tiirmaa	Estonia	3:25	32:15.1	51	+6:26.9
53	55	Uladzimir Kudrevich	Belarus	5:32	32:29.8	52	+8:48.6
	25	Patrik Lichý	Slovakia	1:57	DNF		
	54	Sergej Sharabayev	Kazakhstan	4:24	DNS		
