= FIS Nordic World Ski Championships 2011 – Team normal hill/4 × 5 km =

The Men's Team normal hill/4 x 5 km at the FIS Nordic World Ski Championships 2011 was held on 28 February 2011. The ski jumping part of this event took place at 11:30 CET while the cross country part of the event took place at 15:00 CET. This event replaced the 10 km mass start event held at the previous world championships that was won by Todd Lodwick of the United States.

== Ski Jumping ==
Rank	Bib	Country	Distance (m)	Points	Time difference
1	9	France; François Braud; Sébastien Lacroix; Maxime Laheurte; Jason Lamy-Chappuis	103.0; 100.5; 110.5; 107.0	523.2; 128.0; 120.4; 141.5; 133.3	
2	10	Germany; Johannes Rydzek; Björn Kircheisen; Tino Edelmann; Eric Frenzel	103.5; 103.0; 105.5; 106.0	513.5; 127.0; 126.1; 131.3; 129.1	+0:13
3	11	Norway; Jan Schmid; Magnus Moan; Mikko Kokslien; Håvard Klemetsen	106.0; 99.0; 101.5; 102.5	497.5; 133.8; 115.5; 120.7; 127.5	+0:34
4	12	Austria; David Kreiner; Bernhard Gruber; Felix Gottwald; Mario Stecher	101.5; 104.0; 101.0; 100.5	486.6; 122.0; 128.9; 117.0; 118.7	+0:49
5	6	United States; Johnny Spillane; Bill Demong; Bryan Fletcher; Todd Lodwick	93.0; 100.5; 101.5; 100.0	472.5; 107.8; 121.6; 122.2; 120.9	+1:08
6	3	Slovenia; Gašper Berlot; Mitja Oranič; Jože Kamenik; Marjan Jelenko	99.5; 99.0; 100.0; 101.0	471.8; 117.8; 117.0; 117.4; 119.6	+1:09
7	5	Finland; Hannu Manninen; Joni Karjalainen; Eetu Vähäsöyrinki; Janne Ryynänen	94.0; 95.5; 98.0; 100.0	448.6; 108.7; 105.5; 115.1; 119.3	+1:39
8	7	Japan; Yūsuke Minato; Norihito Kobayashi; Daito Takahashi; Akito Watabe	92.5; 90.5; 102.0; 97.0	443.1; 105.1; 97.3; 124.5; 116.2	+1:47
9	4	Czech Republic; Lukáš Havránek; Aleš Vodseďálek; Miroslav Dvořák; Tomáš Slavík	93.0; 94.5; 95.5; 98.0	437.1; 105.5; 109.0; 107.8; 114.8	+1:55
10	1	Russia; Sergey Maslennikov; Ivan Panin; Niyaz Nabeev; Dimitry Matveev	97.5; 98.5; 98.0; 88.5	432.5; 112.0; 114.5; 111.7; 94.3	+2:01
11	2	Estonia; Aldo Leetoja; Kail Piho; Karl-August Tiirmaa; Han-Hendrik Piho	95.0; 93.5; 97.0; 84.0	404.2; 108.6; 102.5; 109.7; 83.4	+2:39
12	8	Italy; Alessandro Pittin; Mattia Runggaldier; Giuseppe Michielli; Lukas Runggaldier	92.0; 79.5; 95.5; 96.5	394.9; 103.6; 72.7; 105.8; 112.8	+2:51

== Cross-Country ==
Rank	Bib	Country	Deficit	Time	Rank	Time difference
1st place, gold medalist(s)	4	Austria; David Kreiner; Bernhard Gruber; Felix Gottwald; Mario Stecher	0:49	47:18.8; 11:50.8; 11:53.3; 11:25.9; 12:08.8	1	48:07.8
2nd place, silver medalist(s)	2	Germany; Johannes Rydzek; Eric Frenzel; Björn Kircheisen; Tino Edelmann	0:13	47:55.2; 11:57.8; 12:02.9; 11:45.8; 12:08.7	3	+0.4
3rd place, bronze medalist(s)	3	Norway; Mikko Kokslien; Håvard Klemetsen; Jan Schmid; Magnus Moan	0:34	48:14.4; 11:37.1; 12:11.2; 12:00.1; 12:26.0	4	+40.6
4	5	United States; Bill Demong; Bryan Fletcher; Johnny Spillane; Todd Lodwick	1:08	47:54.6; 11:32.4; 12:16.7; 12:01.9; 12:03.6	2	+54.8
5	1	France; Maxime Laheurte; Sébastien Lacroix; François Braud; Jason Lamy-Chappuis	0:00	49:38.2; 12:30.0; 12:06.2; 12:43.7; 12:18.3	7	+1:30.4
6	8	Japan; Norihito Kobayashi; Akito Watabe; Daito Takahashi; Yūsuke Minato	1:47	48:23.8; 11:49.3; 11:55.9; 12:27.1; 12:11.5	5	+2:03.0
7	7	Finland; Hannu Manninen; Janne Ryynänen; Joni Karjalainen; Eetu Vähäsöyrinki	1:39	49:38.3; 11:56.9; 11:56.8; 12:29.6; 13:15.0	8	+3:09.5
8	6	Slovenia; Mitja Oranič; Marjan Jelenko; Jože Kamenik; Gašper Berlot	1:09	50:16.8; 12:15.7; 12:08.4; 12:58.8; 12:53.9	9	+3:18.0
9	12	Italy; Giuseppe Michielli; Lukas Runggaldier; Alessandro Pittin; Mattia Runggaldier	2:51	49:08.2; 11:57.4; 12:22.4; 12:07.0; 12:41.4	6	+3:51.4
10	9	Czech Republic; Miroslav Dvořák; Tomáš Slavík; Aleš Vodseďálek; Lukáš Havránek	1:55	50:51.0; 12:19.9; 12:32.3; 12:54.9; 13:03.9	10	+4:38.2
11	10	Russia; Ivan Panin; Niyaz Nabeev; Sergey Maslennikov; Dimitry Matveev	2:01	51:16.1; 12:53.6; 12:48.8; 12:43.8; 12:49.9	12	+5:09.3
12	11	Estonia; Kail Piho; Han-Hendrik Piho; Karl-August Tiirmaa; Aldo Leetoja	2:39	51:11.0; 12:22.3; 12:42.3; 12:57.4; 13:09.0	11	+5:42.2
