= Nordic combined at the 2014 Winter Olympics – Team large hill/4 × 5 km =

Team large hill/4 × 5 km at the XXII Olympic Winter Games
- Pictogram for Nordic combined
- Venue: RusSki Gorki Jumping Center
- Dates: 20 February 2014
- Competitors: 36 from 9 nations
- Winning time: 47:13.5

Medalists
1st place, gold medalist(s)		Magnus Moan; Magnus Krog; Jørgen Graabak; Håvard Klemetsen	Norway
2nd place, silver medalist(s)		Fabian Rießle; Björn Kircheisen; Johannes Rydzek; Eric Frenzel	Germany
3rd place, bronze medalist(s)		Lukas Klapfer; Christoph Bieler; Mario Stecher; Bernhard Gruber	Austria

The men's team large hill/4 × 5 km Nordic combined competition for the 2014 Winter Olympics in Sochi, Russia, was held at RusSki Gorki Jumping Center on 20 February.

== Results ==
=== Ski jumping ===
The Ski jumping was started at 12:00.

Rank	Bib	Country	Distance (m)	Points	Time difference
1	9	Germany; Fabian Rießle; Björn Kircheisen; Johannes Rydzek; Eric Frenzel	126.5; 131.0; 130.0; 129.0	481.7; 117.0; 120.8; 121.9; 122.0	—
2	8	Austria; Lukas Klapfer; Christoph Bieler; Mario Stecher; Bernhard Gruber	126.0; 133.0; 132.5; 122.0	476.3; 114.8; 126.7; 125.3; 109.5	+0:07
3	10	Norway; Magnus Moan; Magnus Krog; Jørgen Graabak; Håvard Klemetsen	125.5; 124.5; 123.0; 137.5	462.8; 114.8; 107.4; 110.4; 130.2	+0:25
4	7	France; Maxime Laheurte; Sébastien Lacroix; François Braud; Jason Lamy-Chappuis	121.5; 121.5; 130.0; 129.5	455.2; 106.3; 108.4; 120.0; 120.5	+0:35
5	2	Czech Republic; Tomáš Portyk; Tomáš Slavík; Miroslav Dvořák; Pavel Churavý	124.0; 119.5; 124.0; 125.5	440.0; 113.9; 104.2; 111.9; 110.0	+0:56
6	6	Japan; Akito Watabe; Yūsuke Minato; Hideaki Nagai; Yoshito Watabe	128.0; 110.5; 123.5; 126.0	433.3; 120.9; 90.2; 108.2; 114.0	+1:05
7	1	Russia; Ernest Yahin; Niyaz Nabeev; Ivan Panin; Evgenii Klimov	116.5; 121.0; 118.5; 130.5	426.2; 96.0; 105.0; 101.5; 123.7	+1:14
8	5	United States; Todd Lodwick; Taylor Fletcher; Bill Demong; Bryan Fletcher	116.5; 112.5; 121.5; 115.0	397.6; 99.9; 92.5; 108.0; 97.2	+1:52
9	4	Italy; Armin Bauer; Lukas Runggaldier; Samuel Costa; Alessandro Pittin	112.0; 110.5; 120.0; 116.5	383.9; 88.7; 88.7; 106.3; 100.2	+2:10
	3	Finland; Ilkka Herola; Mikke Leinonen; Janne Ryynänen; Eetu Vähäsöyrinki	DNS	DNS	DNS

=== Cross-country ===
The cross-country skiing was started at 15:00.

Rank	Bib	Country	Deficit	Time	Rank	Time difference
1st place, gold medalist(s)	3	Norway; Magnus Moan; Håvard Klemetsen; Magnus Krog; Jørgen Graabak	0:25	46:48.5; 11:22.9; 11:45.8; 11:42.6; 11:57.2	1	—
2nd place, silver medalist(s)	1	Germany; Eric Frenzel; Björn Kircheisen; Johannes Rydzek; Fabian Rießle	0:00	47:13.8; 11:48.2; 11:45.9; 11:42.6; 11:57.1	3	+0.3
3rd place, bronze medalist(s)	2	Austria; Lukas Klapfer; Christoph Bieler; Bernhard Gruber; Mario Stecher	0:07	47:09.9; 11:40.5; 11:47.1; 11:43.4; 11:58.9	2	+3.4
4	4	France; Sébastien Lacroix; François Braud; Maxime Laheurte; Jason Lamy-Chappuis	0:35	47:51.3; 11:42.2; 11:53.6; 12:23.3; 11:52.2	6	+1:12.8
5	6	Japan; Hideaki Nagai; Yūsuke Minato; Yoshito Watabe; Akito Watabe	1:05	47:25.6; 12:00.5; 11:37.4; 12:14.3; 11:33.4	4	+1:17.1
6	8	United States; Bryan Fletcher; Todd Lodwick; Taylor Fletcher; Bill Demong	1:52	47:43.1; 11:52.6; 12:37.2; 11:38.9; 11:34.4	5	+2:21.6
7	5	Czech Republic; Pavel Churavý; Tomáš Slavík; Miroslav Dvořák; Tomáš Portyk	0:56	48:40.1; 12:15.0; 12:19.3; 11:56.2; 12:09.6	8	+2:22.6
8	9	Italy; Lukas Runggaldier; Armin Bauer; Samuel Costa; Alessandro Pittin	2:10	47:54.7; 12:06.0; 11:44.1; 12:00.9; 12:03.7	7	+2:51.2
9	7	Russia; Evgenii Klimov; Niyaz Nabeev; Ernest Yahin; Ivan Panin	1:14	51:35.8; 13:02.8; 12:47.8; 12:38.3; 13:06.9	9	+5:36.3
