= Nordic combined at the 2014 Winter Olympics – Individual large hill/10 km =

Men's individual large hill/10 km at the XXII Olympic Winter Games
- Pictogram for Nordic combined
- Venue: RusSki Gorki Jumping Center
- Dates: 18 February 2014
- Competitors: 46 from 15 nations
- Winning time: 23:27.5

Medalists
1st place, gold medalist(s)		Jørgen Graabak	Norway
2nd place, silver medalist(s)		Magnus Moan	Norway
3rd place, bronze medalist(s)		Fabian Rießle	Germany

The men's individual large hill/10 km Nordic combined competition for the 2014 Winter Olympics in Sochi, Russia, was held at RusSki Gorki Jumping Center on 18 February.

== Results ==
=== Ski jumping ===
The ski jumping was held at 13:30.

Rank	Bib	Name	Country	Distance (m)	Points	Time difference
1	46	Eric Frenzel	Germany	139.5	129.0	0.00
2	44	Håvard Klemetsen	Norway	137.5	127.0	+0:08
3	33	Bernhard Gruber	Austria	136.5	123.4	+0:22
4	45	Akito Watabe	Japan	134.0	120.8	+0:33
5	43	Jason Lamy-Chappuis	France	133.5	120.7	+0:33
6	38	Jørgen Graabak	Norway	132.0	118.4	+0:42
7	41	Magnus Moan	Norway	133.0	117.8	+0:45
8	1	Kristjan Ilves	Estonia	125.0	117.2	+0:47
9	30	Fabian Rießle	Germany	130.0	115.1	+0:56
10	18	Tomas Portyk	Czech Republic	128.5	114.4	+0:58
11	35	Björn Kircheisen	Germany	129.0	113.2	+1:03
12	42	Johannes Rydzek	Germany	129.5	112.7	+1:05
13	39	Lukas Klapfer	Austria	127.5	109.9	+1:16
14	25	Marjan Jelenko	Slovenia	124.5	109.1	+1:20
15	17	Maxime Laheurte	France	125.0	108.0	+1:24
16	28	Ilkka Herola	Finland	126.5	106.8	+1:29
17	36	Christoph Bieler	Austria	125.5	106.4	+1:30
18	40	Magnus Krog	Norway	125.5	106.1	+1:32
19	24	François Braud	France	121.0	105.5	+1:34
20	7	Viktor Pasichnyk	Ukraine	122.5	104.6	+1:38
21	8	Karl-August Tiirmaa	Estonia	123.0	104.3	+1:39
22	32	Miroslav Dvořák	Czech Republic	125.0	104.2	+1:39
23	29	Mario Stecher	Austria	124.5	104.0	+1:40
24	14	Pavel Churavý	Czech Republic	123.0	103.6	+1:42
25	34	Tim Hug	Switzerland	123.5	102.3	+1:47
26	4	Tomáš Slavík	Czech Republic	120.5	101.0	+1:52
27	37	Bryan Fletcher	United States	121.5	99.3	+1:59
27	26	Hideaki Nagai	Japan	119.0	99.3	+1:59
27	12	Eetu Vähäsöyrinki	Finland	124.5	99.3	+1:59
30	11	Todd Lodwick	United States	126.0	98.8	+2:01
31	21	Sébastien Lacroix	France	120.0	98.0	+2.04
32	9	Adam Cieslar	Poland	122.0	97.8	+2:05
33	15	Mitja Oranič	Slovenia	118.5	96.7	+2:09
34	13	Gašper Berlot	Slovenia	120.0	96.4	+2:10
35	23	Taylor Fletcher	United States	115.5	95.8	+2:13
36	20	Yoshito Watabe	Japan	119.5	95.4	+2:14
37	16	Han Hendrik Piho	Estonia	118.0	95.3	+2:15
38	27	Bill Demong	United States	116.5	94.5	+2:18
39	31	Alessandro Pittin	Italy	119.5	93.2	+2:23
40	5	Janne Ryynänen	Finland	117.0	91.7	+2:29
41	19	Armin Bauer	Italy	115.0	91.4	+2:30
42	10	Mikke Leinonen	Finland	118.5	89.9	+2:36
43	3	Ivan Panin	Russia	114.5	89.5	+2:38
44	6	Giuseppe Michielli	Italy	114.5	89.1	+2:40
45	22	Taihei Kato	Japan	126.5	87.6	+2:46
46	2	Lukas Runggaldier	Italy	112.5	86.8	+2:49

=== Cross-country ===
The cross-country part was held at 16:00.

Rank	Bib	Name	Country	Start time	Cross country time	Cross country rank	Finish time
1st place, gold medalist(s)	6	Jørgen Graabak	Norway	+0:42	22:45.5	12	0.00
2nd place, silver medalist(s)	41	Magnus Moan	Norway	+0:45	22:43.1	10	+0.6
3rd place, bronze medalist(s)	30	Fabian Rießle	Germany	+0:56	22:33.1	8	+1.6
4	35	Björn Kircheisen	Germany	+1:03	22:26.6	4	+2.1
5	33	Bernhard Gruber	Austria	+0:22	23:16.8	24	+11.3
6	45	Akito Watabe	Japan	+0:33	23:06.0	19	+11.5
7	43	Jason Lamy-Chappuis	France	+0:33	23:10.9	22	+16.4
8	42	Johannes Rydzek	Germany	+1:05	22:46.4	13	+23.9
9	44	Håvard Klemetsen	Norway	+0:08	23:44.0	26	+24.5
10	46	Eric Frenzel	Germany	0.00	23:57.9	30	+30.4
11	32	Miroslav Dvořák	Czech Republic	+1:39	22:21.1	2	+32.6
12	40	Magnus Krog	Norway	+1:32	22:32.2	7	+36.7
13	24	François Braud	France	+1:34	22:31.2	5	+37.7
14	28	Ilkka Herola	Finland	+1:29	22:42.2	9	+43.7
15	39	Lukas Klapfer	Austria	+1:16	23:03.7	16	+52.2
16	25	Marjan Jelenko	Slovenia	+1:20	23:08.6	20	+1:01.1
17	36	Christoph Bieler	Austria	+1:30	23:03.9	17	+1:06.4
18	31	Alessandro Pittin	Italy	+2:23	22:20.5	1	+1:16.0
19	29	Mario Stecher	Austria	+1:40	23:04.1	18	+1:16.6
20	23	Taylor Fletcher	United States	+2:13	22:31.6	6	+1:17.1
21	21	Sébastien Lacroix	France	+2:04	22:47.5	14	+1:24.0
22	37	Bryan Fletcher	United States	+1:59	22:53.3	15	+1:24.8
23	19	Armin Bauer	Italy	+2:30	22:23.5	3	+1:26.0
24	34	Tim Hug	Switzerland	+1:47	23:09.5	21	+1:29.0
25	18	Tomas Portyk	Czech Republic	+0:58	24:01.8	34	+1:32.3
26	26	Hideaki Nagai	Japan	+1:59	23:11.7	23	+1:43.2
27	17	Maxime Laheurte	France	+1:24	23:55.6	29	+1:52.1
28	2	Lukas Runggaldier	Italy	+2:49	22:44.0	11	+2:05.5
29	4	Tomáš Slavík	Czech Republic	+1:52	23:44.2	27	+2:08.7
30	7	Viktor Pasichnyk	Ukraine	+1:38	23:59.6	31	+2:10.1
31	27	Bill Demong	United States	+2:18	23:23.3	25	+2:13.8
32	14	Pavel Churavý	Czech Republic	+1:42	24:10.0	35	+2:24.5
33	13	Gašper Berlot	Slovenia	+2:10	23:46.6	28	+2:29.1
34	1	Kristjan Ilves	Estonia	+0:47	25:24.5	43	+2:44.0
35	20	Yoshito Watabe	Japan	+2:14	24:00.4	33	+2:46.9
36	16	Han Hendrik Piho	Estonia	+2:15	24:00.0	32	+2:47.5
37	9	Adam Cieslar	Poland	+2:05	24:10.8	36	+2:48.3
38	12	Eetu Vähäsöyrinki	Finland	+1:59	24:25.2	39	+2:56.7
39	15	Mitja Oranič	Slovenia	+2:09	24:29.8	40	+3:11.3
40	5	Janne Ryynänen	Finland	+2:29	24:16.9	37	+3:18.4
41	6	Giuseppe Michielli	Italy	+2:40	24:16.9	38	+3:29.4
42	10	Mikke Leinonen	Finland	+2:36	24:43.4	41	+3:51.9
43	3	Ivan Panin	Russia	+2:38	24:45.8	42	+3:56.3
44	8	Karl-August Tiirmaa	Estonia	+1:39	26:06.4	44	+4:17.9
	11	Todd Lodwick	United States		DNS		
	22	Taihei Kato	Japan		DNS		
