= FIS Nordic World Ski Championships 2013 – Team normal hill/4 × 5 km =

Team normal hill/4 × 5 km at the FIS Nordic World Ski Championships 2013
- Date: 24 February 2013
- Competitors: 48 from 12 nations
- Winning time: 57:34.0

Medalists
gold medal	François Braud; Maxime Laheurte; Sébastien Lacroix; Jason Lamy-Chappuis	France
silver medal	Jørgen Gråbak; Håvard Klemetsen; Magnus Krog; Magnus Moan	Norway
bronze medal	Taylor Fletcher; Bryan Fletcher; Todd Lodwick; Bill Demong	United States

The team normal hill/4x5 km was held on 24 February 2013.

== Ski jumping ==
The ski jumping was started at 10:00.

Rank	Bib	Country	Distance (m)	Points	Time difference
1	8	Japan; Akito Watabe; Yoshito Watabe; Yusuke Minato; Taihei Kato	101.5; 99.5; 87.0; 98.0	467.5; 122.8; 122.7; 99.1; 122.9	
2	9	France; Maxime Laheurte; François Braud; Sébastien Lacroix; Jason Lamy-Chappuis	100.5; 90.0; 93.0; 95.5	451.1; 116.4; 105.2; 112.4; 117.1	+0:22
3	10	Austria; Wilhelm Denifl; Bernhard Gruber; Lukas Klapfer; Mario Stecher	101.5; 92.5; 93.0; 91.5	448.8; 120.4; 110.8; 108.9; 108.7	+0:25
4	11	Norway; Magnus Krog; Jørgen Gråbak; Magnus Moan; Håvard Klemetsen	97.5; 90.5; 94.5; 97.5	430.3; 110.8; 82.5; 113.0; 125.0	+0:50
5	7	United States; Todd Lodwick; Bill Demong; Taylor Fletcher; Bryan Fletcher	93.5; 86.5; 93.0; 95.5	421.3; 99.4; 101.0; 105.1; 115.8	+1:02
6	12	Germany; Björn Kircheisen; Fabian Rießle; Tino Edelmann; Eric Frenzel	83.0; 87.5; 92.0; 92.5	412.3; 85.1; 102.7; 110.4; 114.1	+1:14
7	5	Slovenia; Matic Plaznik; Mitja Oranič; Gašper Berlot; Marjan Jelenko	90.5; 86.0; 85.5; 95.5	403.3; 98.7; 94.7; 91.6; 118.3	+1:26
8	4	Finland; Janne Ryynänen; Eetu Vähäsöyrinki; Ilkka Herola; Mikke Leinonen	91.5; 85.5; 92.0; 85.0	398.2; 104.0; 93.3; 103.9; 97.0	+1:32
9	3	Italy; Alessandro Pittin; Lukas Runggaldier; Armin Bauer; Giuseppe Michielli	91.0; 89.5; 89.5; 85.0	396.6; 104.8; 98.0; 98.8; 95.0	+1:35
9	2	Estonia; Han Hendrik Piho; Karl-August Tiirmaa; Kail Piho; Kristjan Ilves	88.5; 95.0; 86.5; 86.5	396.6; 101.5; 103.6; 93.9; 97.6	+1:35
11	6	Czech Republic; Tomáš Portýk; Miroslav Dvořák; Tomáš Slavík; Pavel Churavý	85.5; 83.5; 91.0; 92.0	387.7; 86.5; 88.8; 103.4; 109.0	+1:46
12	1	Russia; Ivan Panin; Denis Isaykin; Ernest Yahin; Yevgeni Klimov	84.5; 83.0; 89.5; 87.5	357.8; 81.6; 82.3; 98.6; 95.3	+2:26

== Cross-country skiing ==
The cross-country skiing was started at 15:00.

Rank	Bib	Country	Deficit	Time	Rank	Deficit
1st place, gold medalist(s)	2	France; François Braud; Maxime Laheurte; Sébastien Lacroix; Jason Lamy-Chappuis	0:22	57:34.0; 14:34.9; 14:46.9; 13:51.9; 13:58.3	4	
2nd place, silver medalist(s)	4	Norway; Jørgen Gråbak; Håvard Klemetsen; Magnus Krog; Magnus Moan	0:50	57:34.4; 14:06.4; 14:43.9; 13:54.9; 13:59.2	2	+0.4
3rd place, bronze medalist(s)	5	United States; Taylor Fletcher; Bryan Fletcher; Todd Lodwick; Bill Demong	1:02	57:38.2; 13:58.6; 14:40.3; 14:01.6; 13:55.7	1	+4.2
4	1	Japan; Yoshito Watabe; Taihei Kato; Akito Watabe; Yusuke Minato	0:00	57:39.7; 15:00.1; 14:41.3; 13:53.2; 14:05.1	7	+5.7
5	3	Austria; Wilhelm Denifl; Bernhard Gruber; Lukas Klapfer; Mario Stecher	0:25	57:41.6; 14:25.1; 14:27.5; 14:25.3; 13:58.7	5	+7.6
6	6	Germany; Björn Kircheisen; Tino Edelmann; Eric Frenzel; Fabian Rießle	1:14	58:41.6; 14:16.1; 14:36.3; 14:06.3; 14:28.9	6	+1:07.6
7	9	Italy; Lukas Runggaldier; Giuseppe Michielli; Armin Bauer; Alessandro Pittin	1:35	58:44.5; 14:17.9; 14:33.0; 14:16.0; 14:02.6	3	+1:10.5
8	8	Finland; Ilkka Herola; Mikke Leinonen; Janne Ryynänen; Eetu Vähäsöyrinki	1:32	1:01:10.8; 14:39.0; 14:52.1; 14:59.1; 15:08.6	8	+3:36.8
9	7	Slovenia; Marjan Jelenko; Mitja Oranič; Matic Plaznik; Gašper Berlot	1:26	1:02:33.0; 15:30.4; 15:05.9; 15:13.1; 15:17.6	11	+4:59.0
10	11	Czech Republic; Miroslav Dvořák; Tomáš Slavík; Tomáš Portýk; Pavel Churavý	1:46	1:02:40.7; 15:22.2; 15:12.1; 15:30.2; 14:50.2	10	+5:06.7
11	10	Estonia; Kail Piho; Han Hendrik Piho; Karl-August Tiirmaa; Kristjan Ilves	1:35	1:02:52.2; 14:38.0; 15:26.4; 15:35.3; 15:37.5	12	+5:18.2
12	12	Russia; Denis Isaykin; Ivan Panin; Ernest Yahin; Yevgeni Klimov	2:26	1:03:06.9; 14:33.3; 15:03.6; 14:59.3; 16:04.7	9	+5:32.9
