= 2013–14 FIS Nordic Combined World Cup =

International skiing competition

Nordic Combined World Cup 2013/14
Winners
- Overall: (Germany) Eric Frenzel
- Nations Cup: Germany
- Triple trophy: (Germany) Eric Frenzel

Competitions
- Venues: 12
- Individual: 17
- Team: 5

The 2013/14 FIS Nordic Combined World Cup was the 31st World Cup season, a combination of ski jumping and cross-country skiing organized by FIS. It will start on 30 November 2013 in Kuusamo, Finland and will end on 16 March 2014 in Falun, Sweden.

== Calendar ==
=== Men ===
Num	Season	Date	Place	Hill	Discipline	Winner	Second	Third	Ref.
408	1	30 November 2013	(Finland) Kuusamo	Rukatunturi	HS142 / 10 km	(Germany) Eric Frenzel	(Norway) Jørgen Graabak	(Norway) Magnus Krog	
409	2	7 December 2013	(Norway) Lillehammer	Lysgårdsbakken	HS106 / 10 km	(France) Jason Lamy Chappuis	(Japan) Akito Watabe	(Norway) Mikko Kokslien	
410	3	8 December 2013	(Norway) Lillehammer	Lysgårdsbakken	HS138 / 10 km	(Germany) Eric Frenzel	(Norway) Magnus Krog	(Japan) Akito Watabe	
411	4	15 December 2013	(Austria) Ramsau	W90-Mattensprunganlage	HS98 / 10 km	(Germany) Eric Frenzel	(Norway) Håvard Klemetsen	(Norway) Mikko Kokslien	
412	5	21 December 2013	(Germany) Schonach	Langenwaldschanze	HS106 / 10 km	(Norway) Magnus Moan	(Norway) Håvard Klemetsen	(Japan) Akito Watabe	
413	6	22 December 2013	(Germany) Schonach	Langenwaldschanze	HS106 / 10 km	(France) Jason Lamy Chappuis	(Germany) Johannes Rydzek	(Japan) Akito Watabe	
414	7	4 January 2014	(Russia) Chaykovsky	Snezhinka	HS106 / 10 km	(Switzerland) Tim Hug	(Germany) Björn Kircheisen	(Czech Republic) Miroslav Dvořák	
415	8	5 January 2014	(Russia) Chaykovsky	Snezhinka	HS140 / 10 km	(Austria) Wilhelm Denifl	(Germany) Björn Kircheisen	(Czech Republic) Miroslav Dvořák	
416	9	11 January 2014	(France) Chaux-Neuve	La Côté Feuillée	HS118 / 10 km	(Norway) Mikko Kokslien	(Norway) Magnus Krog	(Norway) Jørgen Graabak	
1st Nordic Combined Triple Overall (17–19 January 2014)
417	10	17 January 2014	(Austria) Seefeld	Toni-Seelos-Olympiaschanze	HS109 / 5 km	(Germany) Eric Frenzel	(Norway) Magnus Moan	(Germany) Tino Edelmann	
418	11	18 January 2014	(Austria) Seefeld	Toni-Seelos-Olympiaschanze	HS109 / 10 km	(Germany) Eric Frenzel	(Germany) Johannes Rydzek	(Norway) Magnus Moan	
419	12	19 January 2014	(Austria) Seefeld	Toni-Seelos-Olympiaschanze	HS109 / 15 km	(Germany) Eric Frenzel	(Norway) Håvard Klemetsen	(Norway) Magnus Moan	
420	13	26 January 2014	(Germany) Oberstdorf	Schattenbergschanze	HS137 / 10 km	(Germany) Eric Frenzel	(Norway) Jan Schmid	(Japan) Akito Watabe	
2014 Winter Olympics
421	14	28 February 2014	(Finland) Lahti	Salpausselkä	HS130 / 10 km	(Germany) Johannes Rydzek	(Japan) Akito Watabe	(Germany) Eric Frenzel	
422	15	6 March 2014	(Norway) Trondheim	Granåsen	HS140 / 10 km	(Germany) Johannes Rydzek	(Norway) Jørgen Graabak	(Norway) Magnus Moan	
423	16	8 March 2014	(Norway) Oslo	Holmenkollbakken	HS134 / 10 km	(Germany) Johannes Rydzek	(Norway) Magnus Moan	(France) François Braud	
424	17	15 March 2014	(Sweden) Falun	Lugnet	HS134 / 10 km	(Japan) Akito Watabe	(Norway) Jørgen Graabak	(Italy) Alessandro Pittin	

=== Team ===
Num	Season	Date	Place	Hill	Discipline	Winner	Second	Third	Ref.
21	1	1 December 2013	(Finland) Kuusamo	Rukatunturi	HS142 / 4 x 5 km	Norway Håvard Klemetsen; Magnus Krog; Mikko Kokslien; Jørgen Graabak	Germany Björn Kircheisen; Manuel Faißt; Johannes Rydzek; Eric Frenzel	Japan Taihei Kato; Yoshito Watabe; Hideaki Nagai; Akito Watabe	
22	2	14 December 2013	(Austria) Ramsau	W90-Mattensprunganlage	HS98 / 2 x 7.5 km Sprint	Norway I Mikko Kokslien; Jørgen Graabak	Norway II Håvard Klemetsen; Magnus Krog	Italy Samuel Costa; Alessandro Pittin	
23	3	12 January 2014	(France) Chaux-Neuve	La Côté Feuillée	HS118 / 2 x 7.5 km Sprint	Germany II Tino Edelmann; Fabian Rießle	Norway II Mikko Kokslien; Jørgen Graabak	Germany I Johannes Rydzek; Eric Frenzel	
24	4	25 January 2014	(Germany) Oberstdorf	Schattenbergschanze	HS137 / 4 x 5 km	Germany Tino Edelmann; Johannes Rydzek; Fabian Rießle; Eric Frenzel	France Maxime Laheurte; François Braud; Sébastien Lacroix; Jason Lamy Chappuis	Austria Wilhelm Denifl; Marco Pichlmayer; Christoph Bieler; Mario Stecher	
25	5	1 March 2014	(Finland) Lahti	Salpausselkä	HS130 / 2 x 7.5 km Sprint	Norway I Håvard Klemetsen; Jørgen Graabak	Germany I Eric Frenzel; Johannes Rydzek	France I François Braud; Sébastien Lacroix	
		16 March 2014	(Sweden) Falun	Lugnet	HS100 / 4 x 5 km	strong wind			

== Standings ==
=== Overall ===
Rank		Points
1	(Germany) Eric Frenzel	1031
2	(Germany) Johannes Rydzek	779
3	(Japan) Akito Watabe	730
4	(Norway) Magnus Moan	571
5	(Norway) Håvard Klemetsen	530
6	(France) Jason Lamy Chappuis	526
7	(Norway) Jørgen Gråbak	509
8	(Norway) Mikko Kokslien	454
9	(Austria) Wilhelm Denifl	380
10	(Norway) Magnus Krog	368

Rank		Points
11	(Austria) Christoph Bieler	349
12	(Germany) Björn Kircheisen	340
13	(Austria) Lukas Klapfer	327
14	(Norway) Jan Schmid	324
15	(Germany) Tino Edelmann	304
16	(Austria) Bernhard Gruber	292
17	(Italy) Alessandro Pittin	285
18	(United States) Bryan Fletcher	255
18	(Germany) Fabian Rießle	255
20	(France) François Braud	252

Rank		Points
21	(Switzerland) Tim Hug	248
22	(Finland) Ilkka Herola	228
23	(Czech Republic) Miroslav Dvořák	212
24	(Austria) Mario Stecher	196
25	(United States) Bill Demong	167
26	(Germany) Manuel Faißt	149
27	(United States) Taylor Fletcher	130
27	(Slovenia) Marjan Jelenko	130
29	(Japan) Hideaki Nagai	126
30	(Norway) Thomas Kjelbotn	115

- Standings after 17 events.

=== Nations Cup ===
Rank		Points
1	Germany	4123
2	Norway	4025
3	Austria	2707
4	France	1905
5	Japan	1628
6	United States	916
7	Italy	825
8	Finland	670
9	Slovenia	564
10	Czech Republic	471

- Standings after 22 events.

== Achievements ==
First World Cup podium

- Sebastien Lacroix (FRA), 29, in his 11th season – no. 3 in the WC 3 in Kuusamo
- Miroslav Dvořák (CZE), 25, in his 8th season – no. 3 in the WC 14 in Almaty

Victory in this World Cup (in brackets victory for all time)

- Eric Frenzel (GER), 4 (7) first places
- Magnus Moan (NOR), 3 (21) first places
- Jason Lamy-Chappuis (FRA), 2 (22) first places
- Björn Kircheisen (GER), 1 (16) first places
- Christoph Bieler (AUT), 1 (6) first places
- Mikko Kokslien (NOR), 1 (5) first places
- Bernhard Gruber (AUT), 1 (4) first places
- Tino Edelmann (GER), 1 (3) first places
