= 2011–12 FIS Nordic Combined World Cup =

International skiing competition

Nordic Combined World Cup 2011/12
Winners
- Overall: (France) Jason Lamy-Chappuis
- Nations Cup: Norway

Competitions
- Venues: 12
- Individual: 23
- Team: 3
- Cancelled: 5

The 2011–12 FIS Nordic Combined World Cup was the 29th world cup season, a combination of ski jumping and cross-country skiing organized by FIS. It started on 25 November 2011 in Kuusamo, Finland and ended on 10 March 2012 in Oslo, Norway.

== Calendar ==
=== Men ===
| Num | Season | Date | Place | Hill | Discipline | Winner | Second | Third | Ref. |
|---|---|---|---|---|---|---|---|---|---|
| 368 | 1 | 25 November 2011 | (Finland) Kuusamo | Rukatunturi | HS142 / 10 km | (Norway) Magnus Krog | (Japan) Akito Watabe | (Germany) Tino Edelmann | |
| 369 | 2 | 26 November 2011 | (Finland) Kuusamo | Rukatunturi | HS142 / 10 km | (Germany) Tino Edelmann | (Finland) Janne Ryynänen | (Japan) Akito Watabe | |
| 370 | 3 | 3 December 2011 | (Norway) Lillehammer | Lysgårdsbakken | HS100 / 10 km | (Norway) Haavard Klemetsen | (Italy) Alessandro Pittin | (Germany) Tino Edelmann | |
| 371 | 4 | 4 December 2011 | (Norway) Lillehammer | Lysgårdsbakken | HS138 / Penalty Race | (Germany) Eric Frenzel | (France) Jason Lamy-Chappuis | (Germany) Björn Kircheisen | |
| 372 | 5 | 10 December 2011 | (Austria) Ramsau | W90-Mattensprunganlage | HS98 / 10 km | (Norway) Jan Schmid | (France) Jason Lamy-Chappuis | (Germany) Tino Edelmann | |
| 373 | 6 | 11 December 2011 | (Austria) Ramsau | W90-Mattensprunganlage | HS98 / 10 km | (France) Jason Lamy-Chappuis | (Norway) Magnus Krog | (Austria) Mario Stecher | |
| 374 | 7 | 17 December 2011 | (Austria) Seefeld | Toni-Seelos-Olympiaschanze | HS109 / 10 km | (France) Jason Lamy-Chappuis | (Japan) Akito Watabe | (Italy) Alessandro Pittin | |
| 375 | 8 | 18 December 2011 | (Austria) Seefeld | Toni-Seelos-Olympiaschanze | HS109 / 10 km | (France) Jason Lamy-Chappuis | (Italy) Alessandro Pittin | (Norway) Jørgen Graabak | |
| | | 8 January 2012 | (Germany) Schonach | Langenwaldschanze | HS106 / 10 km | moved to Oberstdorf | | | |
| 376 | 9 | 8 January 2012 | (Germany) Oberstdorf (Note: Rescheduled from Schonach.) | Schattenbergschanze | HS137 / 10 km | (Norway) Mikko Kokslien | (Norway) Magnus Moan | (Germany) Björn Kircheisen | |
| 377 | 10 | 13 January 2012 | (France) Chaux-Neuve | La Côté Feuillée | HS117 / 10 km | (Italy) Alessandro Pittin | (France) Jason Lamy-Chappuis | (Germany) Fabian Rießle | |
| 378 | 11 | 14 January 2012 | (France) Chaux-Neuve | La Côté Feuillée | HS117 / 10 km | (Italy) Alessandro Pittin | (France) Jason Lamy-Chappuis | (Germany) Fabian Rießle | |
| 379 | 12 | 15 January 2012 | (France) Chaux-Neuve | La Côté Feuillée | HS117 / 10 km | (Italy) Alessandro Pittin | (Norway) Jørgen Graabak | (Norway) Mikko Kokslien | |
| | | 28 January 2012 | (Poland) Zakopane | Wielka Krokiew | HS134 / 10 km | technical problems | | | |
| | | 29 January 2012 | (Poland) Zakopane | Wielka Krokiew | HS134 / Penalty Race | technical problems | | | |
| 380 | 13 | 3 February 2012 | (Italy) Val di Fiemme | Trampolino dal Ben | HS134 / Penalty Race | (France) Jason Lamy-Chappuis | (Germany) Björn Kircheisen | (Norway) Mikko Kokslien | |
| 381 | 14 | 5 February 2012 | (Italy) Val di Fiemme | Trampolino dal Ben | HS134 / 10 km | (Japan) Akito Watabe | (Norway) Mikko Kokslien | (United States) Bill Demong | |
| 382 | 15 | 11 February 2012 | (Kazakhstan) Almaty | Gorney Gigant | HS140 / 10 km | (Norway) Mikko Kokslien | (Germany) Björn Kircheisen | (Japan) Akito Watabe | |
| 383 | 16 | 12 February 2012 | (Kazakhstan) Almaty | Gorney Gigant | HS140 / 10 km | (Norway) Mikko Kokslien | (Japan) Akito Watabe | (Austria) Bernhard Gruber | |
| 384 | 17 | 18 February 2012 | (Germany) Klingenthal | Vogtland Arena | HS140 / 10 km | (Japan) Akito Watabe | (France) Jason Lamy-Chappuis | (Austria) Bernhard Gruber | |
| 385 | 18 | 19 February 2012 | (Germany) Klingenthal | Vogtland Arena | HS140 / 10 km | (France) Jason Lamy-Chappuis | (Austria) Bernhard Gruber | (Czech Republic) Tomáš Slavík | |
| 386 | 19 | 25 February 2012 | (Czech Republic) Liberec | Ještěd A | HS134 / 10 km | (Austria) Bernhard Gruber | (Germany) Eric Frenzel | (Austria) Wilhelm Denifl | |
| 387 | 20 | 26 February 2012 | (Czech Republic) Liberec | Ještěd A | HS134 / 10 km | (Japan) Akito Watabe | (France) Jason Lamy-Chappuis | (Austria) Mario Stecher | |
| | | 2 March 2012 | (Finland) Lahti | Salpausselkä | HS106 / 10 km | cancelled | | | |
| 388 | 21 | 3 March 2012 | (Finland) Lahti | Salpausselkä | HS130 / 10 km | (Norway) Jan Schmid | (Germany) Tino Edelmann | (Germany) Johannes Rydzek | |
| 389 | 22 | 9 March 2012 | (Norway) Oslo | Midtstubakken | HS106 / 10 km | (Japan) Akito Watabe | (Norway) Mikko Kokslien | (Austria) Bernhard Gruber | |
| 390 | 23 | 10 March 2012 | (Norway) Oslo | Midtstubakken | HS134 / 10 km | (United States) Bryan Fletcher | (Norway) Mikko Kokslien | (Japan) Taihei Kato | |

=== Team ===
| Num | Season | Date | Place | Hill | Discipline | Winner | Second | Third | Ref. |
|---|---|---|---|---|---|---|---|---|---|
| 13 | 1 | 16 December 2011 | (Austria) Seefeld | Toni-Seelos-Olympiaschanze | HS109 / 2 x 7,5 km Sprint | France I Sébastien Lacroix; Jason Lamy-Chappuis | Italy I Lukas Runggaldier; Alessandro Pittin | Norway I Mikko Kokslien; Magnus Krog | |
| | | 7 January 2012 | (Germany) Schonach | Langenwaldschanze | HS106 / 4 x 5 km | moved to Oberstdorf | | | |
| 14 | 2 | 7 January 2012 | (Germany) Oberstdorf | Schattenbergschanze | HS137 / 4 x 5 km | Norway Magnus Moan; Mikko Kokslien; Jan Schmid; Jørgen Graabak | Germany Johannes Rydzek; Fabian Rießle; Eric Frenzel; Tino Edelmann | Austria Wilhelm Denifl; Christoph Bieler; Mario Stecher; Bernhard Gruber | |
| 15 | 3 | 4 February 2012 | (Italy) Val di Fiemme | Trampolino dal Ben | HS106 / 2 x 7,5 km Sprint | Norway I Mikko Kokslien; Magnus Moan | France I Maxime Laheurte; Jason Lamy-Chappuis | France II François Braud; Sébastien Lacroix | |

== Standings ==
=== Overall ===
| Rank | | Points |
|---|---|---|
| 1 | (France) Jason Lamy-Chappuis | 1306 |
| 2 | (Japan) Akito Watabe | 1238 |
| 3 | (Norway) Mikko Kokslien | 1061 |
| 4 | (Austria) Bernhard Gruber | 765 |
| 5 | (Germany) Björn Kircheisen | 728 |
| 6 | (Germany) Eric Frenzel | 727 |
| 7 | (Italy) Alessandro Pittin | 724 |
| 8 | (Germany) Tino Edelmann | 685 |
| 9 | (Norway) Jan Schmid | 619 |
| 10 | (Norway) Håvard Klemetsen | 559 |

| Rank | | Points |
|---|---|---|
| 11 | (Austria) Wilhelm Denifl | 537 |
| 12 | (Norway) Magnus Moan | 509 |
| 13 | (Germany) Johannes Rydzek | 467 |
| 14 | (Germany) Fabian Rießle | 458 |
| 15 | (Austria) Mario Stecher | 452 |
| 16 | (Norway) Jørgen Graabak | 442 |
| 17 | (United States) Bryan Fletcher | 431 |
| 18 | (Austria) Christoph Bieler | 419 |
| 19 | (France) Sébastien Lacroix | 402 |
| 20 | (United States) Bill Demong | 393 |

| Rank | | Points |
|---|---|---|
| 21 | (Norway) Magnus Krog | 373 |
| 22 | (France) Maxime Laheurte | 302 |
| 23 | (France) François Braud | 293 |
| 24 | (Italy) Lukas Runggaldier | 260 |
| 25 | (Japan) Taihei Kato | 202 |
| 26 | (Finland) Janne Ryynänen | 200 |
| 27 | (Norway) Gudmund Storlien | 183 |
| 28 | (United States) Johnny Spillane | 162 |
| 29 | (Czech Republic) Miroslav Dvořák | 160 |
| 29 | (Japan) Yūsuke Minato | 160 |

- Standings after 23 events.

=== Nations Cup ===
| Rank | | Points |
|---|---|---|
| 1 | Norway | 4903 |
| 2 | Germany | 4109 |
| 3 | France | 3303 |
| 4 | Austria | 3027 |
| 5 | Japan | 2029 |
| 6 | United States | 1668 |
| 7 | Italy | 1623 |
| 8 | Czech Republic | 461 |
| 9 | Finland | 381 |
| 10 | Slovenia | 268 |

- Standings after 26 events.

== Achievements ==
First World Cup career victory

- Magnus Krog (NOR), 24, in his 4th season – the WC 1 in Kuusamo; it also was his first podium
- Haavard Klemetsen (NOR), 32, in his 10th season – the WC 3 in Lillehammer; it also was his first podium
- Jan Schmid (NOR), 28, in his 11th season – the WC 5 in Ramsau; first podium was 2008–09 WC 7 in Ramsau
- Alessandro Pittin (ITA), 21, in his 5th season – the WC 10 in Chaux-Neuve; first podium was 2009–10 WC 6 in Ramsau
- Akito Watabe (JPN), 23, in his 7th season – the WC 14 in Val di Fiemme; first podium was 2009–10 WC 15 in Seefeld
- Bryan Fletcher (USA), 25, in his 4th season – the WC 23 in Oslo; it also was his first podium

First World Cup podium

- Jørgen Graabak (NOR), 20, in his 2nd season – no. 3 in the WC 8 in Seefeld
- Fabian Rießle (GER), 21, in his 4th season – no. 3 in the WC 10 in Chaux-Neuve
- Tomáš Slavík (CZE), 30, in his 9th season – no. 3 in the WC 18 in Klingenthal
- Wilhelm Denifl (AUT), 31, in his 12th season – no. 3 in the WC 19 in Liberec

Victory in this World Cup (in brackets victory for all time)

- Jason Lamy-Chappuis (FRA), 5 (20) first places
- Mikko Kokslien (NOR), 3 (4) first places
- Alessandro Pittin (ITA), 3 (3) first place
- Akito Watabe (JPN), 3 (3) first place
- Jan Schmid (NOR), 2 (2) first place
- Eric Frenzel (GER), 1 (3) first places
- Bernhard Gruber (AUT), 1 (3) first places
- Tino Edelmann (GER), 1 (2) first places
- Magnus Krog (NOR), 1 (1) first place
- Haavard Klemetsen (NOR), 1 (1) first place
- Bryan Fletcher (USA), 1 (1) first place
