= FIS Nordic World Ski Championships 2013 – Team sprint large hill/2 × 7,5 km =

Team sprint large hill/2 × 7.5 km at the FIS Nordic World Ski Championships 2013
- Date: 2 March 2013
- Competitors: 28 from 14 nations
- Winning time: 35:37.9

Medalists
gold medal	Sébastien Lacroix; Jason Lamy-Chappuis	France
silver medal	Wilhelm Denifl; Bernhard Gruber	Austria
bronze medal	Tino Edelmann; Eric Frenzel	Germany

The Team sprint large hill/2 × 7.5 km was held on 2 March 2013.

== Ski jumping ==
The ski jumping was started at 10:00.

Rank	Bib	Country	Distance (m)	Points	Time difference
1	14	Germany; Tino Edelmann; Eric Frenzel	124.5; 127.0	264.3; 128.0; 136.3	0:00
2	10	Japan; Akito Watabe; Taihei Kato	123.5; 126.0	258.4; 126.4; 132.0	+0:12
3	12	Austria; Bernhard Gruber; Wilhelm Denifl	123.0; 122.0	251.8; 123.3; 128.5	+0:25
4	11	France; Jason Lamy-Chappuis; Sébastien Lacroix	120.5; 118.5	242.7; 121.8; 120.9	+0:43
5	13	Norway; Mikko Kokslien; Magnus Moan	118.0; 118.5	238.1; 116.8; 121.3	+0:52
6	8	Czech Republic; Miroslav Dvořák; Pavel Churavý	114.5; 120.0	232.8; 110.7; 122.1	+1:03
7	7	Slovenia; Mitja Oranič; Marjan Jelenko	109.5; 123.5	227.8; 99.5; 128.3	+1:13
8	6	Finland; Ilkka Herola; Eetu Vähäsöyrinki	120.5; 113.5	226.6; 115.4; 111.2	+1:15
9	4	Estonia; Han-Hendrik Piho; Kail Piho	113.0; 113.0	217.5; 107.4; 110.1	+1:34
10	9	United States; Bill Demong; Taylor Fletcher	111.0; 112.5	214.1; 104.9; 109.2	+1:40
11	1	Ukraine; Viktor Pasichnyk; Vitaliy Kalinichenko	107.0; 115.0	206.2; 95.7; 110.5	+1:56
12	2	Russia; Ernest Yahin; Ivan Panin	110.0; 109.5	204.8; 101.8; 103.0	+1:59
13	5	Italy; Armin Bauer; Alessandro Pittin	105.0; 113.5	203.0; 92.7; 110.3	+2:03
14	3	Switzerland; Seppi Hurschler; Tim Hug	102.5; 113.0	196.2; 88.1; 108.1	+2:16

== Cross-country skiing ==
The Cross-country skiing was started at 15:00.

Rank	Bib	Country	Deficit	Time	Rank	Time Behind
1st place, gold medalist(s)	4	France; Sébastien Lacroix; Jason Lamy-Chappuis	+0:43	34:54.9; 17:16.4; 17:38.5	1	35:37.9
2nd place, silver medalist(s)	3	Austria; Wilhelm Denifl; Bernhard Gruber	+0:25	35:29.5; 17:41.1; 17:48.4	4	+16.6
3rd place, bronze medalist(s)	1	Germany; Tino Edelmann; Eric Frenzel	+0:00	36:21.8; 18:27.4; 17:54.4	7	+43.9
4	2	Japan; Taihei Kato; Akito Watabe	+0:12	36:10.4; 18:16.2; 17:54.2	6	+44.5
5	5	Norway; Magnus Moan; Mikko Kokslien	+0:52	35:49.2; 17:55.7; 17:53.5	5	+1:03.3
6	10	United States; Taylor Fletcher; Bill Demong	+1:40	35:22.5; 17.15.8; 18:06.7	2	+1:24.6
7	13	Italy; Armin Bauer; Alessandro Pittin	+2:03	35:28.4; 17:45.1; 17:43.3	3	+1:53.5
8	6	Czech Republic; Pavel Churavý; Miroslav Dvořák	+1:03	36:30.6; 18:33.5; 17:57.1	9	+1:55.7
9	7	Slovenia; Marjan Jelenko; Mitja Oranič	+1:13	36:25.0; 18.15.5; 18:09.5	8	+2:00.1
10	9	Estonia; Kail Piho; Han-Hendrik Piho	+1:34	37:17.9; 18:22.1; 18:55.8	10	+3:14.0
11	8	Finland; Ilkka Herola; Eetu Vähäsöyrinki	+1:15	38:02.5; 18:58.9; 19:03.6	11	+3:39.6
	11	Ukraine; Vitaliy Kalinichenko; Viktor Pasichnyk	+1:56	LAP		
	12	Russia; Ivan Panin; Ernest Yahin	+1:59	LAP		
	14	Switzerland; Tim Hug; Seppi Hurschler	+2:16	LAP		
