= Nordic combined at the FIS Nordic World Ski Championships 2009 =

At the FIS Nordic World Ski Championships 2009 in Liberec, Czech Republic, four Nordic combined were held. It also showed the biggest format changes since the introduction of the Gundersen method at the 1985 World Championships in Seefeld, Austria. In addition to the 10 km mass start event, there were changes in the Gundersen-based individual events. The 7.5 km sprint event was changed to a 10 km individual large hill event while the 15 km individual event was changed to a 10 km individual normal hill event with both being approved in September 2008. These changes also affected the Nordic combined program for the 2010 Winter Olympics in Vancouver though the mass start was excluded. The United States, which had two medals in Nordic combined prior to this championships (Johnny Spillane: gold in 7.5 km sprint at Val di Fiemme in 2003 and Bill Demong: silver in 15 km individual at Sapporo in 2007), won a total of four medals with three golds and a bronze. Todd Lodwick, whose previous best individual finish at the world championships was 13th in the 7.5 km sprint at Oberstdorf in 2005, won golds in the 10 km mass start and 10 km individual normal hill events. His teammate Bill Demong won a gold in the 10 km individual large hill and bronze in the 10 km individual normal hill events. Germans Tino Edelmann and Björn Kircheisen each won a silver in the 4 x 5 km freestyle team event, then won individual silver medals in the 10 km mass start and 10 km individual large hills events, respectively. France's Jason Lamy Chappuis earned two bronze medals, earning them in the 10 km individual large hill and 10 km mass start. Norway's Jan Schmid won a silver in the 10 km mass start and a bronze in the 4 x 5 km freestyle event. A fourth American medal was prevented when Demong was disqualified in the ski jumping part of the 4 x 5 km freestyle team event for failing to wear his bib during competition, dropping the US to 12th and forcing their withdrawal from the cross country portion of the event. The Japanese won their first gold medal at the championships in the team event since 1995 when they edged the Germans in a photo finish. Current World Cup leader Anssi Koivuranta of Finland has a disappointing world championships, earning his best finish of fourth both in the 10 km individual normal hill and 10 km mass start events. Norway's Magnus Moan, second in the World Cup standings, also had a disappointing championships as well, with a best place finish of fifth in the 10 km individual large hill events even though he set the fastest cross-country skiing portion time in both the 10 km individual large hill and the 10 km individual normal hill events.

== Competition changes ==
Nordic combined had the greatest changes in it schedule with the debut of the 10 km mass start and the replacement of the 7.5 km sprint and 15 km individual Gundersen events with two separate 10 km individual events. The first event, replacing the 15 km Gundersen, was a single jump from the individual normal hill followed by a 10 km cross country event using the Gundersen system while the second event, replacing the 7.5 km sprint, was a single jump from the individual large hill followed by a 10 km cross country event also using the Gundersen system. The Nordic combined changes were approved at an autumn seasonal meeting in Zürich, Switzerland, the week of 29 September 2008. Other changes listed in the ski jumping part of the team Nordic combined was only one jump and being listed was the point time differential will be 1 point equals 1.33 seconds. At the closing ceremony of the championships, FIS President Gian Franco Kasper stated that the event will be thoroughly analyzed as part of an overall season assessment as part of the discipline's current overhaul at season's end.

== 10 km individual normal hill ==
22 February. Formerly the 15 km Individual Gundersen, the event consisted of one jump from the normal (HS 100) hill followed by the 10 km cross country race using the Gundersen system. Ronny Ackermann of Germany was three-time defending champion when the event was the 15 km Gundersen and finished 13th in this event. Schmid had the longest jump of the jumping part of the competition, but lost out to Lodwick and Koivuranta on style points with the American outscoring the Finn by 0.5 points by the judges. Koivuranta would fade to fourth during the cross country portion of the event while Demong would ski from 12th to claim bronze in the event. Norway's Magnus Moan had the fastest time in the cross country portion to move from 44th to his final position of 17th, followed by Demong and Lodwick. This was Lodwick's second gold medal and the fourth overall for the United States at these championships, more than they had earned in the country's history in the championships (3 total as of the 2007 championships.).

HS 100

Rank	Athlete	Jump (m)	Points
1	Todd Lodwick (USA)	99.5	135.5
2	Anssi Koivuranta (FIN)	99.5	135.0
3	Jan Schmid (NOR)	100.5	135.0

Medal	Athlete	Start time (pos)	Finish time
Gold	Todd Lodwick (USA)	0.0 (1)	24:22.3
Silver	Jan Schmid (NOR)	+ 2.0 (3)	+ 13.0
Bronze	Bill Demong (USA)	+ 36.0 (12)	+ 33.5

== 10 km individual large hill ==
28 February. Formerly the 7.5 km sprint, the event now consisted of one jump from the large (HS 134) hill followed by the 10 km cross country race using the Gundersen system. Finland's Hannu Manninen was the defending champion, but did not defend his title to his retirement following the 2007–08 season. Lamy Chappius had the longest jump at the ski jumping part of the event while Koivuranta finished ahead of Ryynänen to better style points by the judges even though both jumped the same distance. Ryynänen would finish fourth while Koivuranta would not start in the cross-country part of the event. Norway's Magnus Moan would have the fastest time in the cross country portion of the event, moving from 34th to his fifth-place finish. American Bill Demong redeemed himself from his disqualification in the 4 x 5 km team event two days earlier by winning his first individual world championship gold medal and his second overall. Demong's gold brought the total American gold count to three which tied all of medals the country had won at the world championships prior to Liberec, and their sixth overall. Kircheisen's silver was the eighth overall for Germany at these championships.

HS 134

Rank	Athlete	Jump (m)	Points
1	Jason Lamy Chappuis (FRA)	131.0	133.0
2	Anssi Koivuranta (FIN)	127.0	126.5
3	Janne Ryynänen (FIN)	127.0	126.0

Medal	Athlete	Start time (pos)	Finish time
Gold	Bill Demong (USA)	+ 52.0 (8)	23:36.6
Silver	Björn Kircheisen (GER)	+ 44.0 (7)	+ 12.8
Bronze	Jason Lamy Chappuis (FRA)	0.0 (1)	+ 31.4

== 10 km mass start ==
19–20 February. This event debuted at these championships. It consisted of a 10 km mass start of cross country skiing. The winner of this part of the event was awarded 120 points with those finishing behind having points awarded by how they finish using the Gundersen method (1 point equals 4 seconds). The athletes then had two ski jumps from the normal (HS 100) hill measured by distance only and scored using the K-point of the hill. HS 100 has a K-point of 90 meters which was set at 60 points. Anything before or after 90 m had two points per meter change from the set 60 point standard. Points shown are to rounded time. The top three leaders after the cross country portion of the event were Lodwick (United States), Edelmann (Germany), and Demong (United States). A trial round was held for the ski jump, but the ski jump portion was postponed on the 19th to continuous snowfall and high winds. As a result, the jumping part of the event took place 16:00 to 17:45 CET the next day. Mario Stecher of Austria had the longest first jump of 101.0 m while Lamy-Chappius had the longest second jump. It was the first individual world championship medals for all the top three finishers.

10 km cross country

Rank	Athlete	Time	Points
1	Todd Lodwick (USA)	24:49.7	120.0
2	Tino Edelmann (GER)	+ 4.6	118.7
3	Bill Demong (USA)	+ 5.2	118.7

HS 100

Medal	Athlete	Start points (pos)	Jump 1 (m)	Jump 2 (m)	Jump points	Total points
Gold	Todd Lodwick (USA)	120.0 (1)	100.5 m	97.5 m	156.0	276.0
Silver	Tino Edelmann (GER)	118.7 (2)	100.5 m	97.0 m	155.0	273.7
Bronze	Jason Lamy Chappuis (FRA)	115.2 (20)	95.5 m	99.5 m	150.0	265.2

== 4 × 5 km freestyle team ==
26 February. The Finnish team of Anssi Koivuranta, Janne Ryynänen, Jaakko Tallus and Hannu Manninen were the defending champions, but was only able to finish eighth with Ryynänen and Tallus. The biggest shock in the ski jumping part of the event was American Bill Demong being disqualified for not wearing his bib during competition (ICR 526.1), causing the team to not start the cross-country part of the event (This incident would later be known as "Bibgate".). Asikainen had the longest jump of the ski jumping part with 136.0 m. Kokslien had the fastest first leg of the relay to move Norway from sixth to fourth with the top three leaders at the first exchange being Japan, Austria (who would finish fifth), and France (who would finish fourth). Braud of France had the fastest second leg to move the French from third to first. Second and third after the second exchange were Norway and Germany, respectively. Kircheisen of Germany ran the fastest third leg to move his country at the third exchange from third to first with Japan and Norway holding second and third, respectively. Japan's Kobayashi had both the fastest anchor leg and fastest overall leg to help his country beat Germany in a photo finish to win their first Winter Olympic or world championships in this event since the 1995 event in Thunder Bay.

HS 134 hill

Rank	Team	Jumpers	Jump 1 (m)	Points
1	France	François Braud	127.0	470.6
1	France	Maxime Laheurte	120.5	470.6
1	France	Sébastien Lacroix	116.5	470.6
1	France	Jason Lamy Chappuis	127.0	470.6
2	Austria	Mario Stecher	119.0	464.8
2	Austria	Bernhard Gruber	128.5	464.8
2	Austria	Wilhelm Denifl	123.0	464.8
2	Austria	Christoph Bieler	118.0	464.8
3	Finland	Janne Ryynänen	124.0	460.5
3	Finland	Lauri Asikainen	136.0	460.5
3	Finland	Jaakko Tallus	119.0	460.5
3	Finland	Jim Härtull	110.0	460.5

4 x 5 km freestyle

Medal	Team	Athletes	Start time (position)	Finish time
Gold	Japan	Yūsuke Minato	+24.0 (5)	48:32.3
Gold	Japan	Taihei Kato	+24.0 (5)	48:32.3
Gold	Japan	Akito Watabe	+24.0 (5)	48:32.3
Gold	Japan	Norihito Kobayashi	+24.0 (5)	48:32.3
Silver	Germany	Ronny Ackermann	+17.0 (4)	+ 0.0
Silver	Germany	Eric Frenzel	+17.0 (4)	+ 0.0
Silver	Germany	Björn Kircheisen	+17.0 (4)	+ 0.0
Silver	Germany	Tino Edelmann	+17.0 (4)	+ 0.0
Bronze	Norway	Mikko Kokslien	+42.0 (6)	+ 3.6
Bronze	Norway	Petter Tande	+42.0 (6)	+ 3.6
Bronze	Norway	Jan Schmid	+42.0 (6)	+ 3.6
Bronze	Norway	Magnus Moan	+42.0 (6)	+ 3.6
