= Joni Karjalainen =

Finnish ice hockey player

- Born: 13 April 1991 (age 33); Helsinki, Finland
- Height: 5 ft 8 in (173 cm)
- Weight: 168 lb (76 kg; 12 st 0 lb)
- Position: Forward
- Shot: Left
- Played for: Tappara
- NHL draft: Undrafted
- Playing career: 2010–2012

Joni Karjalainen (born 13 April 1991) is a Finnish former ice hockey player who played for Tappara of the SM-liiga.
