= Sergey Maslennikov =

Russian Nordic combined skier (born 1982)

Sergej Yevgenyevich Maslennikov (Russian: Серге́й Евгеньевич Масленников, born 18 April 1982 in Ufa) is a Russian Nordic combined skier who has competed since 2002.

== Career ==
Competing in two Winter Olympics, he earned his best finish of ninth in the 4 x 5 km team event at Turin in 2006 while his best individual finish was tenth in the 15 km individual event at those same games.

Maslennikov's best finish at the FIS Nordic World Ski Championships was tenth twice (4 x 5 km team: 2005, 2009) while his best individual finish was 20th in the 10 km mass start at Liberec in 2009.

His best World Cup finish was tenth twice, both in 2005.

Since 2012 he has been working as a specialist in the Winter Sports department at the Saint Petersburg National Team Training Center.
