= Niyaz Nabeev =

Russian Nordic combined skier (born 1989)

Personal information
- Born: March 31, 1989 Kazan, Tatar ASSR, Soviet Union

Sport
- Sport: Skiing
Medal record
Nordic combined
Representing Russia
Winter Universiade
Bronze medal – third place	2011 Erzurum	Team normal hill
Bronze medal – third place	2015 Štrbské Pleso	Team normal hill

Niyaz Gabdulkhakovich Nabeev (Russian: Нияз Габдулхакович Набеев; born March 31, 1989) is a Russian Nordic combined skier who has competed since 2007. He finished 43rd in the 10 km individual large hill event at the 2010 Winter Olympics in Vancouver.

At the FIS Nordic World Ski Championships 2009 in Liberec, Nabeev finished tenth in the 4 x 5 km team and 48th in the 10 km individual large hill events.

His best World Cup finish was 8th in a 4 x 5 km team event in Oberstdorf, Germany in 2014, while his best individual finish was 28th in Kuusamo, Finland in December 2012.
