= Mikke Leinonen =

Finnish Nordic combined skier (born 1992)

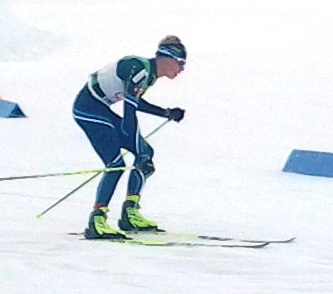
- Leinonen in Lahti, 2014

Personal information
- Nationality: Finnish
- Born: 14 January 1992 (age 33); Lahti

Sport
- Country: Finland
- Sport: Nordic combined skiing

Mikke Leinonen (born 14 January 1992) is a Finnish Nordic combined skier. He was born in Lahti. He competed at the FIS Nordic World Ski Championships 2013 in Val di Fiemme, and at the 2014 Winter Olympics in Sochi.
