= Giuseppe Michielli =

Italian skier

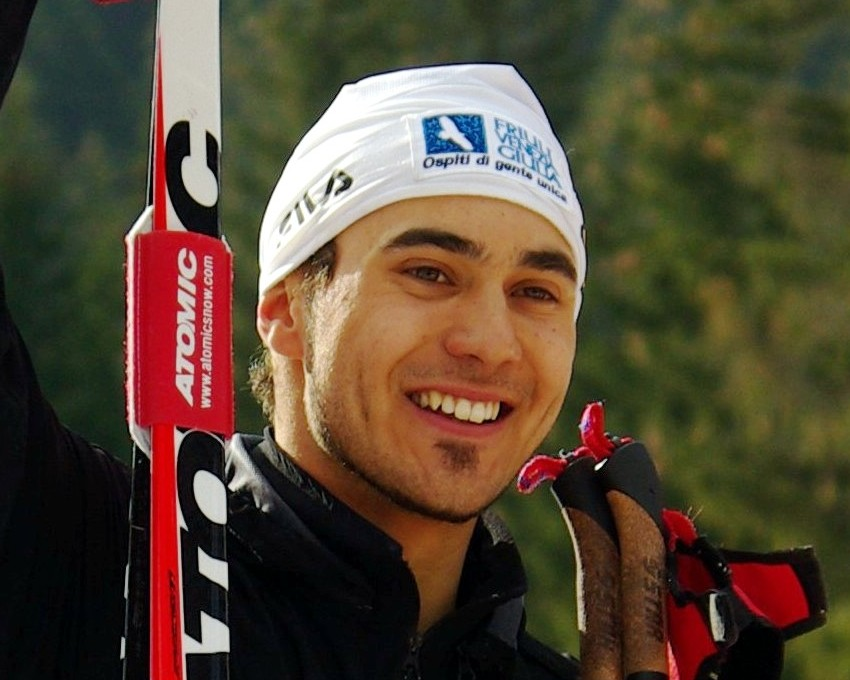
- Giuseppe Michielli in 2008.

Personal information
- Nationality: Italy
- Born: 13 May 1985 (age 41) Gemona del Friuli, Italy

Sport
- Sport: Skiing
- Club: Fiamme Oro

World Cup career
- Seasons: 2012–present

Giuseppe Michielli (born 23 May 1985) is an Italian Nordic combined skier who has competed since 2002. Competing in two Winter Olympics, he earned his best finish of tenth in the 4 x 5 km team event at Vancouver in 2010 while earning his best finish of 14th in the 15 km individual event at Turin four years earlier.

== Biography ==
Michielli's best finish at the FIS Nordic World Ski Championships was seventh in the 4 x 5 km team event at Liberec in 2009 while his best individual finish was 28th in the 10 km individual normal hill event at those same championships.

His best World Cup finish was ninth in a 4 x 5 km team event in Italy in 2005 while his best individual finish was tenth in a 10 km individual normal hill event in Germany in 2010.

Further notable results

- 2004: 3rd, Italian championships of Nordic combined skiing
- 2005:
  - 2nd, Italian championships of Nordic combined skiing
  - 2nd, Italian championships of Nordic combined skiing, sprint
- 2006:
  - 1st, Italian championships of Nordic combined skiing, sprint
  - 2nd, Italian championships of Nordic combined skiing
- 2007:
  - 1st, Italian championships of Nordic combined skiing
  - 1st, Italian championships of Nordic combined skiing, sprint
- 2008: 3rd, Italian championships of Nordic combined skiing, sprint
- 2010: 2nd, Italian championships of Nordic combined skiing
- 2011: 2nd, Italian championships of Nordic combined skiing
