= Johnny Spillane =

American athlete (born 1980)

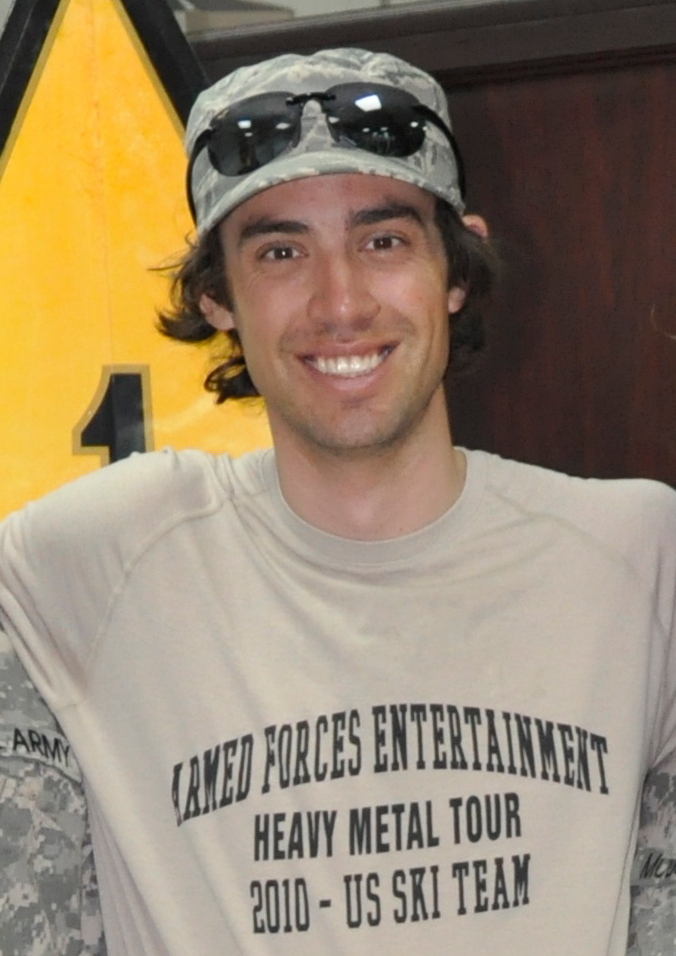
- Spillane in 2010

Personal information
- Born: November 24, 1980 (age 45) Steamboat Springs, Colorado, U.S.
- Height: 183 cm (6 ft 0 in)
- Weight: 67 kg (148 lb)
- Spouse: Hilary Spillane
- Other interests: Flyfishing. Owner of Steamboat Flyfisher and Trout Creek Flies.

Sport
- Sport: Nordic combined
- Club: SSWSC, Steamboat Springs

Achievements and titles
- Olympic finals: 1998, 2002, 2006, 2010
Medal record
Representing the United States
Olympic Games
Silver medal – second place	2010 Vancouver	10 km large hill
Silver medal – second place	2010 Vancouver	10 km normal hill
Silver medal – second place	2010 Vancouver	4×5 km team
World Championships
Gold medal – first place	2003 Val di Fiemme	7.5 km sprint

Johnny Spillane (born November 24, 1980) is an American athlete who competes in Nordic combined, a combination event consisting of ski jumping and cross-country skiing. Spillane is a world champion and three-time Olympic silver medalist. He announced his retirement from Nordic combined on April 18, 2013.

== Early life ==
Spillane was born to Jim and Nancy Spillane on November 24, 1980. He was raised in Steamboat Springs, Colorado, and graduated from the Lowell Whiteman School. For the first couple years, he used alpine skis on jumps, not getting his first pair of jumping skis until he was 13.

== Athletic career ==
Spillane made the United States team for the 1998 Winter Olympics in Nagano, Japan, but did not compete in any events. The next year at the 1999 World Championships he placed 32nd in the individual event and 37th in sprint. Two years later, at the 2001 World Championships, he placed 32nd again in the individual event but vaulted to 14th place in the sprint event. At his second Olympics, the 2002 Games in Salt Lake City, Utah, he finished 32nd in both sprint and individual events.

Spillane won his first championship in 2003, securing first place and the gold medal in the 7.5 km sprint event at the World Championships in Val di Fiemme. In so doing, he became the first American athlete to win a gold medal at the FIS Nordic World Ski Championships. However, an injury prevented him from defending his title at the 2005 Championships. At the 2006 Winter Olympics in Turin, Italy, Spillane finished a disappointing tenth in the 7.5 km sprint and 30th in the individual. World Championships in 2007 and 2009 would continue to be disappointing for him as he placed no higher than 16th in any event. Spillane's coaches reported that although he struggled in the latter half of the 2009 season, they expected him to be ready and competitive for the 2010 Winter Olympics in Vancouver, British Columbia, Canada.

=== 2010 Winter Olympics ===
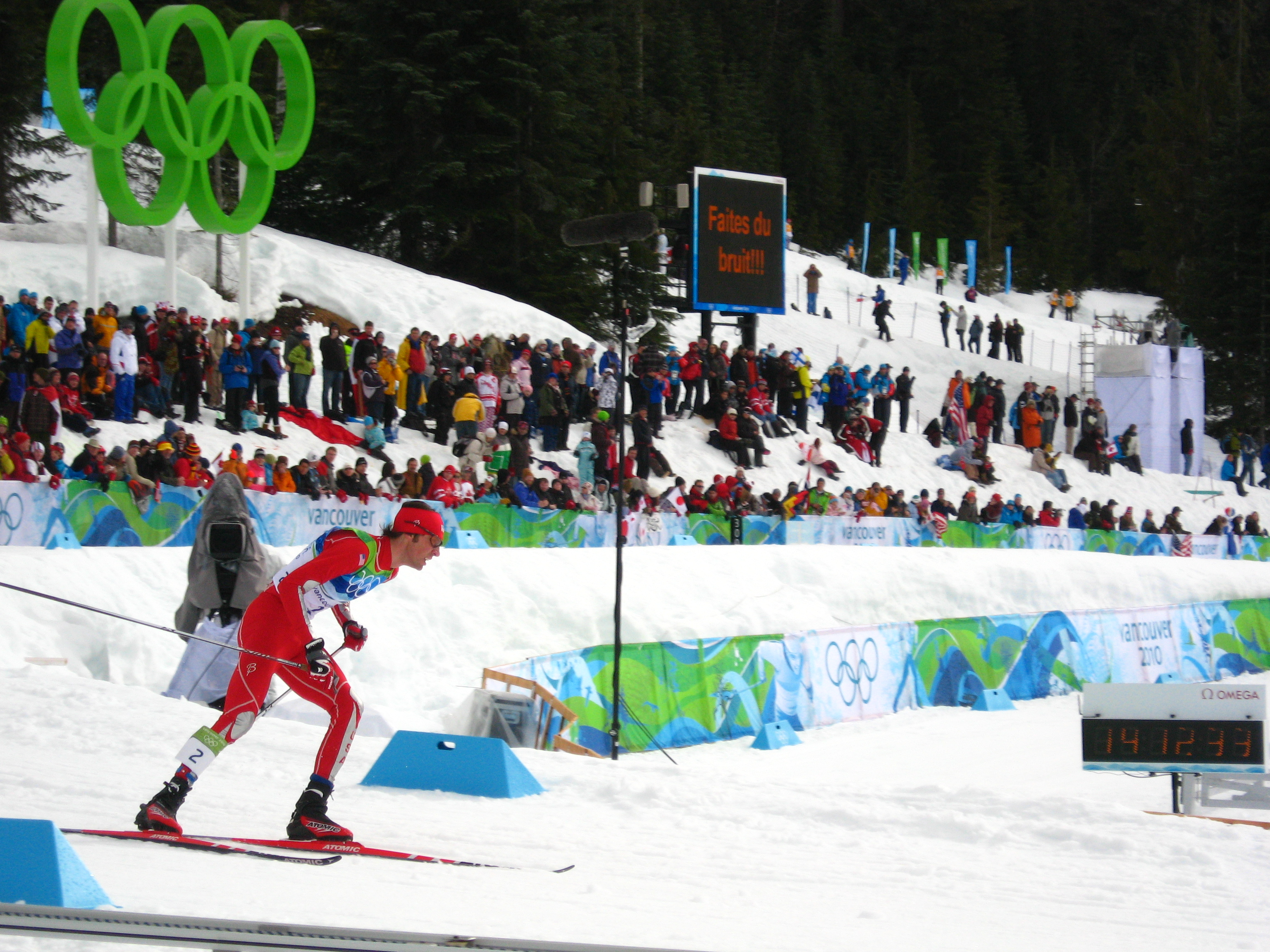
Spillane racing for his third silver during the 10 km individual large hill event

At the 2010 Winter Olympics, in Vancouver, Spillane competed in three events. In his first event, the 10 km individual normal hill event, Spillane won the silver medal – the first American medal in the sport of Nordic Combined, and only the third American medal to be earned in any Nordic sport. After the ski jumping portion of the event, Finnish competitor Janne Ryynänen was in the lead. Spillane, Jason Lamy-Chappuis, and a number of other skiers raced hard to make up the difference with Ryyänen in the cross-country portion of the event. In the middle of the last lap, after Norihito Kobayashi attempted a breakaway and was caught, Spillane took a strong lead. However, he had overexerted himself and slowed down after entering the stadium where the race was to finish. Lamy-Chappuis was able to catch up and pass him in the final stretch. The .4 second difference between their times is the closest finish in the history of Nordic Combined events at the Olympics. Despite the near win, Spillane told media afterwards that he was happy to have won any medal.

In his second event, the 4×5 team event, Spillane helped earn America's second medal, another silver.

In his third event, the 10 km individual large hill, Spillane won the silver medal, finishing behind fellow American Bill Demong.

== Post skiing career ==
Starting with the 2014 Winter Olympics, Spillane has called ski jumping events for NBC Sports and Olympic Channel.
