= Tino Edelmann =

German Nordic combined skier (born 1985)

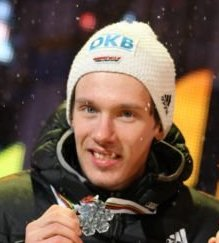
- Edelmann in 2011

Personal information
- Born: 13 April 1985 (age 41) Annaberg-Buchholz, East Germany

Sport
- Sport: Skiing

World Cup career
- Seasons: 2003–2016
- Indiv. podiums: 17
- Indiv. wins: 3
Medal record
Men's Nordic combined
Representing Germany
Winter Olympics
| Bronze medal – third place | 2010 Vancouver | 4 x 5 km team |
World Championships
| Gold medal – first place | 2015 Falun | 4 x 5 km team |
| Silver medal – second place | 2007 Sapporo | 4 x 5 km team |
| Silver medal – second place | 2009 Liberec | 10 km mass start |
| Silver medal – second place | 2009 Liberec | 4 x 5 km team |
| Silver medal – second place | 2011 Oslo | 10 km normal hill |
| Silver medal – second place | 2011 Oslo | 4 x 5 km team normal hill |
| Silver medal – second place | 2011 Oslo | 4 x 5 km team large hill |
| Bronze medal – third place | 2013 Val di Flemme | Team sprint |

Tino Edelmann (born 13 April 1985) is a retired German Nordic combined skier who has competed since 2001. He won a bronze medal in the 4 x 5 km team event at the 2010 Winter Olympics in Vancouver and six silver medals at the FIS Nordic World Ski Championships.

He has five World Cup victories, three individually and two in team.
