= Yūsuke Minato =

Japanese Nordic combined skier (born 1985)

Medal record

Men's Nordic combined

Representing Japan

World Championships
Gold medal – first place	2009 Liberec	4 x 5 km team

Yūsuke Minato (湊 祐介, Minato Yūsuke; born May 13, 1985) is a Japanese Nordic combined skier who has been competing since 2002. He won a gold medal in the 4 x 5 km team event at the FIS Nordic World Ski Championships 2009 in Liberec and earned his best individual finish of sixth in the 10 km individual normal hill event at those same championships.

Minato's best World Cup finish was 12th twice (2008, 2009). His lone victory was in the 7.5 km sprint event at Pragelato in 2007.

He competed for Japan at the 2010 Winter Olympics and 2014 Winter Olympics.
