= Mikko Kokslien =

Norwegian Nordic combined skier

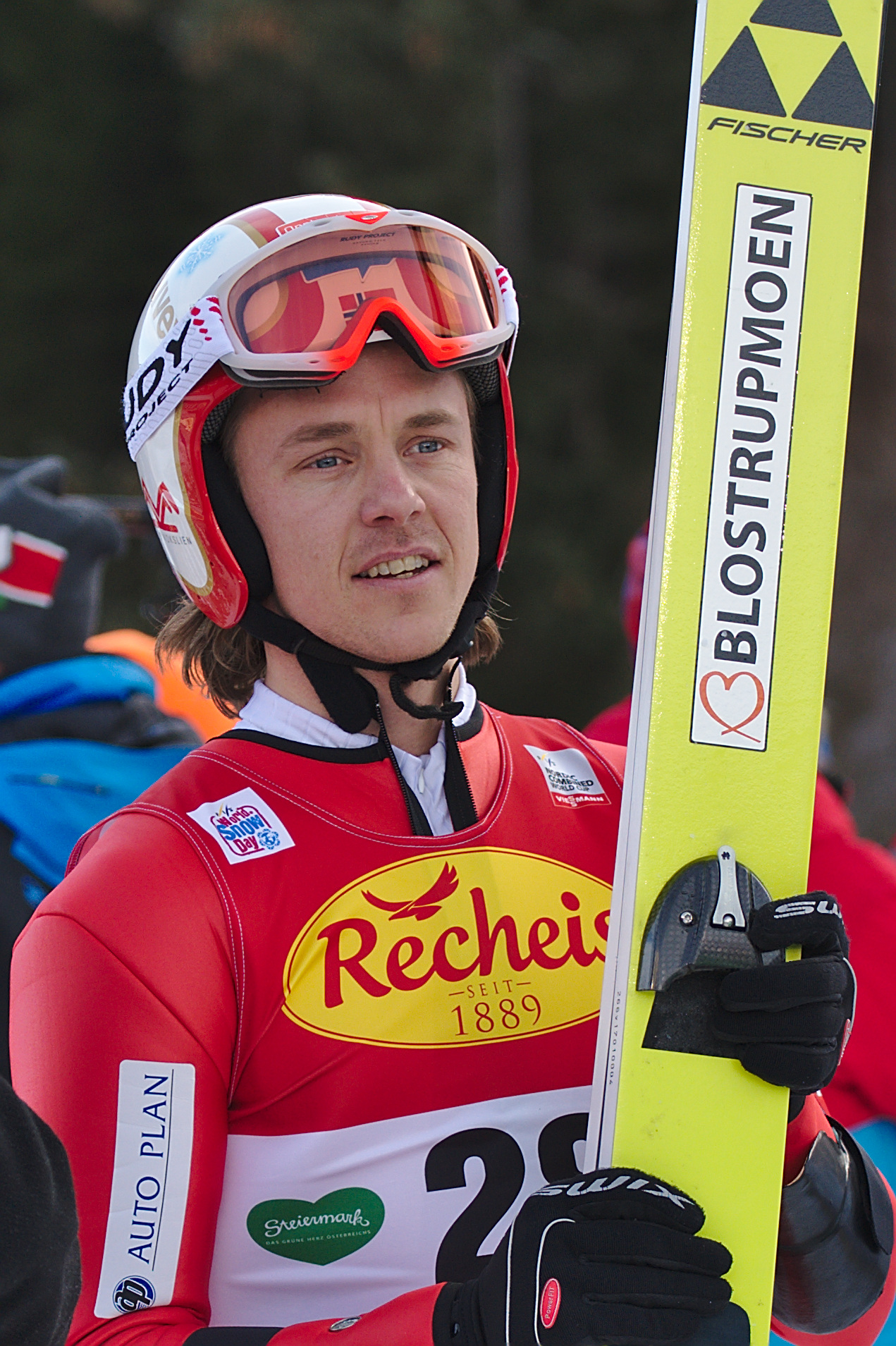

Personal information
- Born: 10 March 1985 (age 41) Lillehammer, Norway

Sport
- Sport: Skiing
- Club: Søre Ål Idrettslag

World Cup career
- Seasons: 2005–2018
- Indiv. podiums: 24
- Indiv. wins: 7
Medal record
World Championships
Silver medal – second place	2015 Falun	4 x 5 km team
Silver medal – second place	2017 Lahti	4 x 5 km team
Bronze medal – third place	2009 Liberec	4 x 5 km team
Bronze medal – third place	2011 Oslo	4 x 5 km team normal hill
Bronze medal – third place	2011 Oslo	4 x 5 km team large hill

Mikko Kokslien (born 10 March 1985) is a Norwegian Nordic combined skier.

He won a bronze medal in the 4 x 5 km team event at the FIS Nordic World Ski Championships 2009 in Liberec and earned his best individual finish of 13th in the 10 km individual large hill at those same championships.

At the 2010 Winter Olympics in Vancouver, Kokslien finished 32nd in the 10 km individual normal hill and 39th in the individual large hill event.

He was the runner-up in the 2010–11 World Cup season.

His mother is a Finn (from Lahti) and Mikko speaks Finnish fluently. He represents the club Søre Ål IL.
