= Armin Bauer =

Italian Nordic combined skier (born 1990)

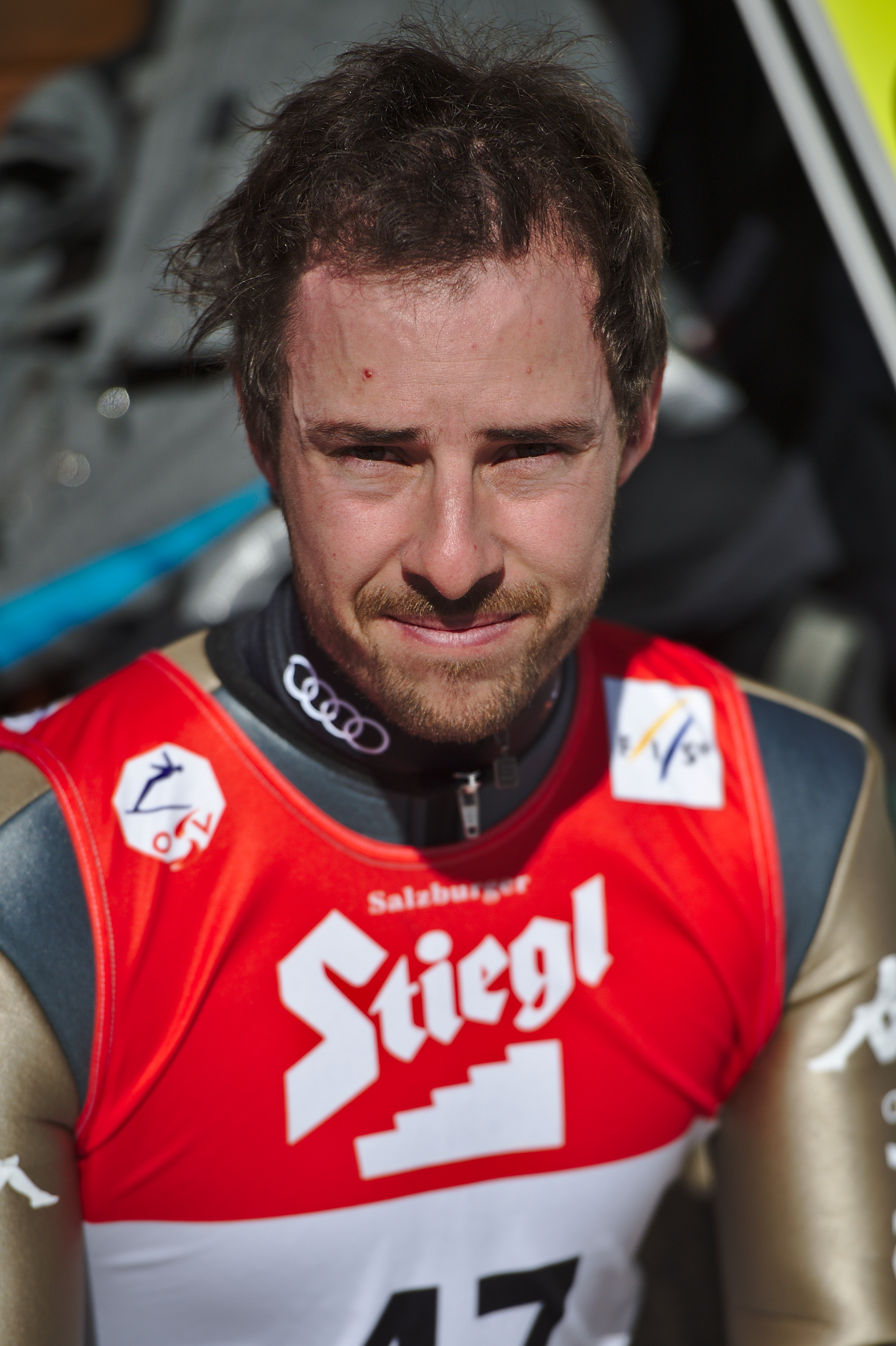

Armin Bauer (born July 15, 1990 in Bolzano) is an Italian Nordic combined skier who has competed since 2005. At the 2010 Winter Olympics in Vancouver, he finished tenth in the 4 x 5 km team, 21st in the 10 km individual large hill, and 43rd in the 10 km individual large hill events.

At the FIS Nordic World Ski Championships 2009 in Liberec, Bauer finished seventh in the 4 x 5 km team, 41st in the 10 km individual large hill, and 49th in the 10 km individual normal hill events.

His best World Cup finish was tenth in a 4 x 5 km team event at Germany in 2009 while his best individual finish was 26th in a 10 km individual large hill event at Norway in 2010.

Further notable results

- 2007: 3rd, Italian championships of Nordic combined skiing, sprint
- 2008: 2nd, Italian championships of Nordic combined skiing
- 2010:
  - 3rd, Italian championships of Nordic combined skiing
  - 3rd, Italian championships of Nordic combined skiing, sprint

Bauer speaks German, Italian and Ladin.
