= Taylor Fletcher =

American Nordic combined skier

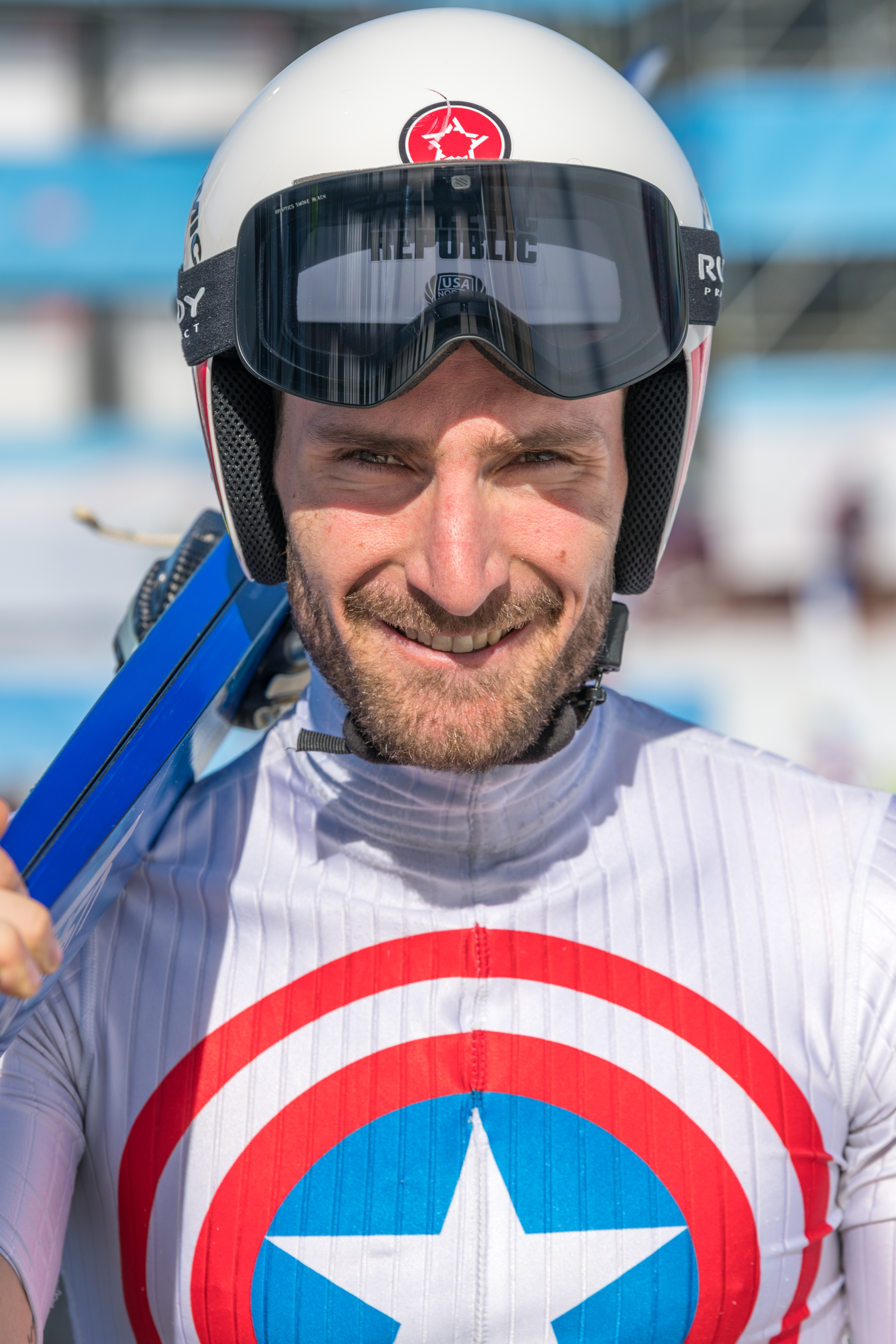

Personal information
- Nationality: United States
- Born: May 11, 1990 (age 36) Steamboat Springs, U.S.
- Height: 183 cm (6 ft 0 in)

Sport
- Sport: Skiing
- Club: Steamboat Springs WSC

World Cup career
- Seasons: 2009–2022
- Indiv. podiums: 2
- Indiv. wins: 0
Medal record
Men's Nordic combined
Representing United States
World Championships
| Bronze medal – third place | 2013 Val di Flemme | Team normal hill |

Taylor Fletcher (born May 11, 1990 in Steamboat Springs, Colorado) is an American Nordic combined skier who has competed since 2006 and ski jumper since 2010. At the 2010 Winter Olympics in Vancouver, he finished 11th in the team large hill ski jumping event and 45th in the Nordic combined 10 km individual large hill event.

Fletcher's best World Cup finish was 3rd in the HS 109/ 10 km event in Seefeld (Austria) in January 2013.

His brother is also a skier, Bryan Fletcher.
