= Wilhelm Denifl =

Austrian Nordic combined skier (born 1980)

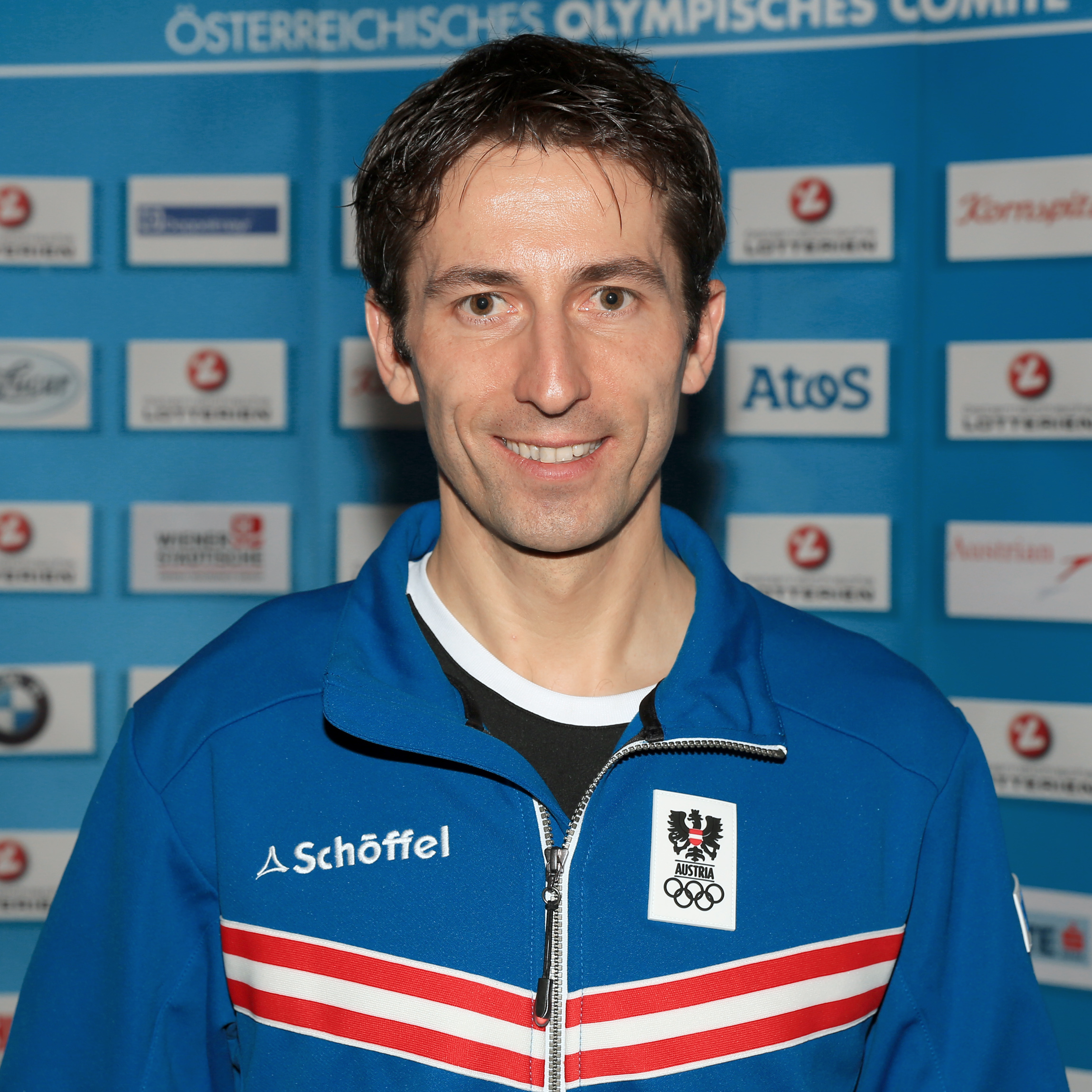

Personal information
- Born: 10 November 1980 (age 46) Rum, Austria
- Height: 1.78 m (5 ft 10 in)

Sport
- Sport: Skiing
- Club: SV Innsbruck-Bergisel

World Cup career
- Seasons: 2000–2019
- Indiv. podiums: 9
- Indiv. wins: 1
Medal record
Men's Nordic combined
Representing Austria
Olympic Games
Bronze medal – third place	2018 Pyeongchang	Team LH
World Championships
Gold medal – first place	2003 Val di Fiemme	4 x 5 km team
Silver medal – second place	2013 Val di Flemme	Team sprint

Wilhelm Denifl (born 10 November 1980) is a retired Austrian Nordic combined skier who has competed between 2000 and 2019. He won a gold medal in the 4 x 5 km team event at the 2003 FIS Nordic World Ski Championships in Val di Fiemme and finished 8th in the 15 km individual event at those same championships.

Denifil has only one victory in his career in the World Cup, in January 2014, in Chaykovsky. He owns the record for the most starts in the World Cup - 295.
