= Mitja Oranič =

Slovenian Nordic combined (born 1986)

Mitja Oranič (born 3 April 1986) is a Slovenian Nordic combined who has competed since 2002. At the 2010 Winter Olympics in Vancouver, he finished 31st in the 10 km individual large hill and 41st in the 10 km individual large hill events.

Oranič's best finish at the FIS Nordic World Ski Championships was 24th in the 10 km individual large hill event at Liberec in 2009.

His best World Cup finish was 11th in a 10 km individual normal hill event at France in 2009.
