= Håvard Klemetsen =

Norwegian Nordic combined skier

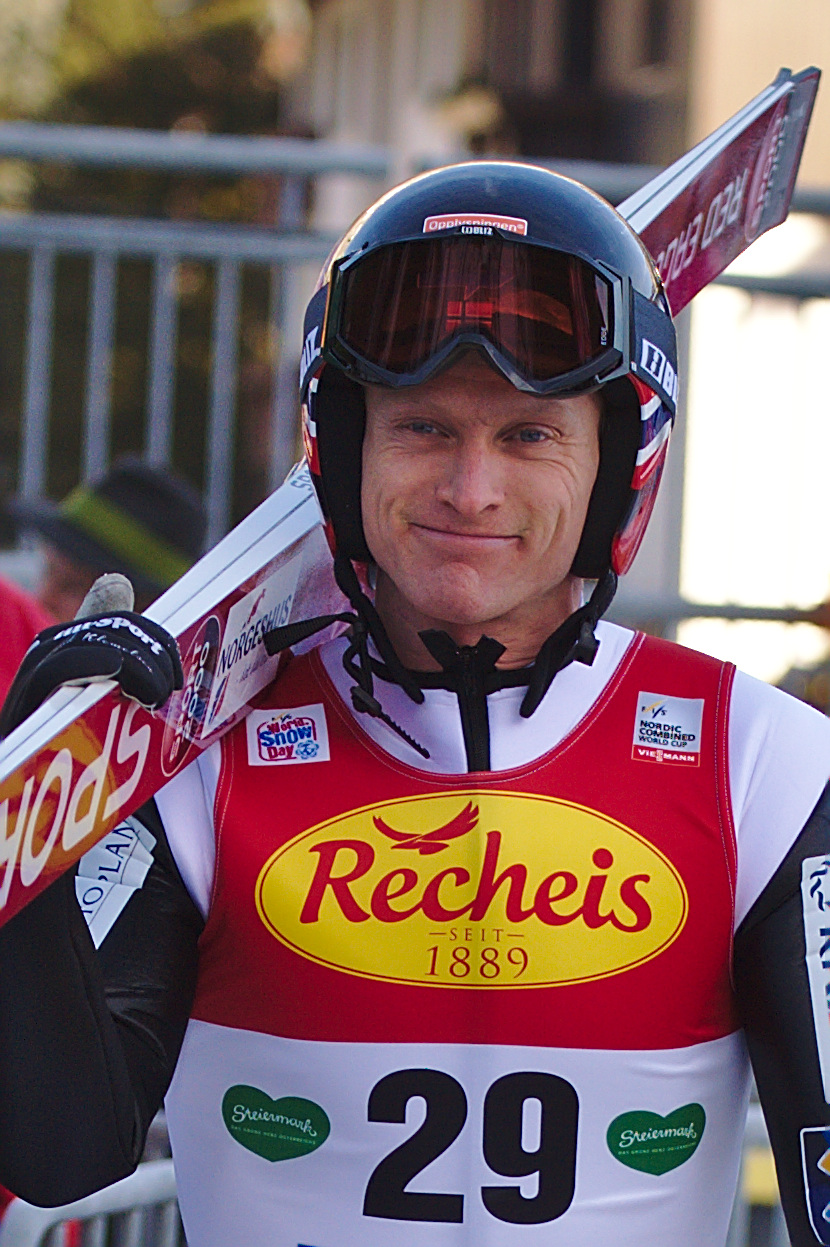

Personal information
- Born: 5 January 1979 (age 47) Kautokeino, Norway
- Height: 181 cm (5 ft 11 in)

Sport
- Sport: Skiing
- Club: Kautokeino IL

World Cup career
- Seasons: 2003–2017
- Indiv. podiums: 7
- Indiv. wins: 1
Medal record
Men's Nordic combined
Representing Norway
Olympic Games
Gold medal – first place	2014 Sochi	4 x 5 km team
World Championships
Gold medal – first place	2005 Oberstdorf	4 x 5 km team
Silver medal – second place	2013 Val di Flemme	Team normal hill
Silver medal – second place	2015 Falun	4 x 5 km team
Bronze medal – third place	2007 Sapporo	4 x 5 km team
Bronze medal – third place	2011 Oslo	4 x 5 km team normal hill
Bronze medal – third place	2011 Oslo	4 x 5 km team large hill
Bronze medal – third place	2015 Falun	Team sprint

Håvard Klemetsen (born 5 January 1979) is a Norwegian former Nordic combined skier who has competed since 2002, representing Kautokeino IL. He debuted in the World Cup in 2003. He has four 4 x 5 km team medals at the FIS Nordic World Ski Championships with a gold in 2005 and bronze in 2007 and twice in 2011. Klemetsen also finished 20th in the 15 km individual event at the 2005 championships.

Klemetsen finished 20th in the 15 km individual at the 2006 Winter Olympics in Turin. His best individual career finish was second in a 7.5 km sprint event in Park City, Utah in the United States in 2002.

In April 2017, he announced his retirement from sport.
