= Eetu Vähäsöyrinki =

Finnish Nordic combined skier (born 1990)

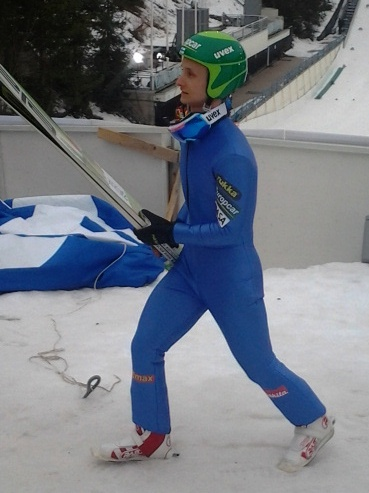
- Vähäsöyrinki in 2014.

Personal information
- Nationality: Finnish
- Born: 12 April 1990 (age 34); Jyväskylä, Finland

Sport
- Sport: Nordic combined skiing

Eetu Vähäsöyrinki (born 12 April 1990) is a Finnish Nordic combined skier. He was born in Jyväskylä. He competed at the FIS Nordic World Ski Championships 2013 in Val di Fiemme, and at the 2014 Winter Olympics in Sochi.
