= Ivan Panin (skier) =

Russian Nordic combined skier (born 1987)

Ivan Panin (Russian: Иван Панин; born 22 July 1987) is a Russian Nordic combined skier. He has competed in the World Cup many times but ever reached podium. Panin is better in ski jumping than in cross country skiing.
