= Sébastien Lacroix =

French Nordic combined skier (born 1983)

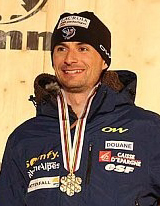

Medal record

Men's Nordic combined

Representing France

World Championships
Gold medal – first place	2013 Val di Flemme	Team normal hill
Gold medal – first place	2013 Val di Flemme	Team sprint
Bronze medal – third place	2015 Falun	4 x 5 km team

Sébastien Lacroix (born 20 April 1983) is a French Nordic combined skier who has competed between 2001 and 2015. At the 2010 Winter Olympics in Vancouver, he finished fourth in the 4 x 5 km team event and finished 19th in both the 10 km individual normal hill and the 10 km individual large hill events.

Lacroix finished fourth in the 4 x 5 km team event and 27th in the 10 km individual large hill event at the FIS Nordic World Ski Championships 2009 in Liberec.

In the FIS Nordic World Ski Championships in Val di Fiemme 2013 he won gold medals in both team events; normal and large hill.

His best World Cup finish was fifth in a 4 x 5 km team event at Germany in 2009 while his best individual finish was seventh in a 10 km individual large hill event at Italy that same year. His best career finish is second on seven occasions in lesser events since 2003.
