= Maxime Laheurte =

French Nordic combined skier (born 1985)

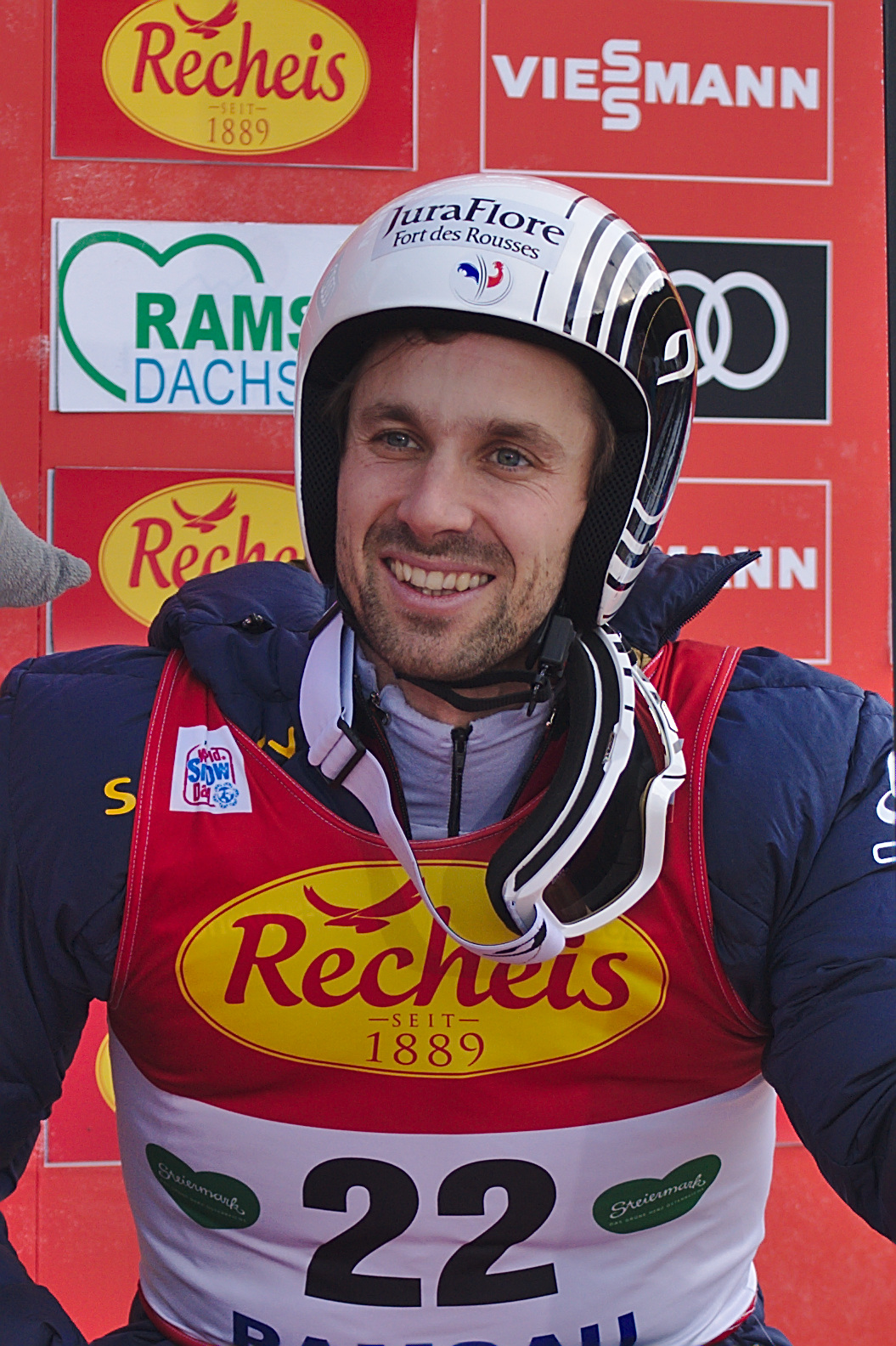

Personal information
- Nationality: France
- Born: 20 May 1985 (age 41) Gérardmer
- Height: 1.73 m (5 ft 8 in)

Sport
- Sport: Skiing
- Club: AS Gérardmer

World Cup career
- Seasons: 2002-2019
- Indiv. starts: 209
- Indiv. podiums: 2
Medal record
World Championships
Gold medal – first place	2013 Val di Flemme	Team normal hill
Bronze medal – third place	2015 Falun	4 x 5 km team

Maxime Laheurte (born 20 May 1985 in Gérardmer) is a retired French Nordic combined athlete who has competed since 2002, including 4 Winter Olympic Games. At the 2010 Winter Olympics, he finished fourth in the 4 x 5 km team and 38th in the 10 km individual large hill event.

Laheurte's best finish at the FIS Nordic World Ski Championships was fourth in the 4 x 5 km team event at Liberec in 2009 while his best individual finish was sixth in the 7.5 km sprint at Sapporo two tears earlier.

His best World Cup finish was third twice, both earned in 2006.
