= FIS Nordic World Ski Championships 2015 – Individual large hill/10 km =

Individual large hill/10 km at the FIS Nordic World Ski Championships 2015
- Date: 26 February 2015
- Competitors: 47 from 15 nations
- Winning time: 22:45.8

Medalists
gold medal	Bernhard Gruber	Austria
silver medal	François Braud	France
bronze medal	Johannes Rydzek	Germany

The individual large hill/10 km event of the FIS Nordic World Ski Championships 2015 was held on 26 February 2015.

== Results ==
=== Ski jumping ===
The ski jumping was started at 10:00

Rank	Bib	Athlete	Country	Distance (m)	Points	Time difference
1	46	Bernhard Gruber	Austria	133.0	119.8	
2	36	Jason Lamy Chappuis	France	129.0	118.5	+0:05
3	34	François Braud	France	129.0	118.0	+0:07
4	32	Yoshito Watabe	Japan	134.0	116.9	+0:12
5	24	Maxime Laheurte	France	128.5	114.1	+0:23
6	47	Eric Frenzel	Germany	132.5	113.8	+0:24
7	41	Håvard Klemetsen	Norway	127.5	113.6	+0:25
8	23	Christoph Bieler	Austria	129.5	112.5	+0:29
9	43	Akito Watabe	Japan	125.0	111.8	+0:32
10	35	Tino Edelmann	Germany	127.5	110.4	+0:38
11	22	Tomáš Portyk	Czech Republic	126.0	110.2	+0:38
12	28	Taihei Kato	Japan	125.5	109.0	+0:43
13	37	Bryan Fletcher	United States	123.5	108.7	+0:44
14	40	Magnus Moan	Norway	125.5	108.1	+0:47
14	25	Tim Hug	Switzerland	126.0	108.1	+0:47
16	10	Ernest Yahin	Russia	122.5	107.4	+0:50
17	42	Johannes Rydzek	Germany	124.5	107.1	+0:51
18	31	Ilkka Herola	Finland	127.0	106.0	+0:55
19	26	Sébastien Lacroix	France	121.5	105.8	+0:56
20	19	Samuel Costa	Italy	121.0	105.4	+0:58
21	13	Takehiro Watanabe	Japan	122.0	104.6	+1:01
22	30	Miroslav Dvořák	Czech Republic	125.0	104.5	+1:01
23	20	Sepp Schneider	Austria	123.0	103.5	+1:05
24	39	Lukas Klapfer	Austria	120.0	103.4	+1:06
25	44	Fabian Rießle	Germany	120.0	100.8	+1:16
26	29	Björn Kircheisen	Germany	121.5	100.6	+1:17
27	45	Jan Schmid	Norway	123.0	99.5	+1:21
28	11	Jim Härtull	Finland	119.0	98.0	+1:27
29	38	Jørgen Gråbak	Norway	116.5	96.4	+1:34
30	16	Bill Demong	United States	116.0	93.7	+1:44
31	8	Leevi Mutru	Finland	114.5	93.6	+1:45
32	21	Gašper Berlot	Slovenia	114.0	92.1	+1:51
33	1	Viktor Pasichnyk	Ukraine	114.5	89.9	+2:00
34	27	Taylor Fletcher	United States	114.0	89.5	+2:01
35	3	Eetu Vähäsöyrinki	Finland	113.5	87.9	+2:08
36	9	Kristjan Ilves	Estonia	115.0	86.7	+2:12
37	15	Lukas Runggaldier	Italy	109.5	85.5	+2:17
38	6	Park Je-un	South Korea	111.5	84.0	+2:23
39	33	Alessandro Pittin	Italy	108.5	80.0	+2:39
39	14	Kail Piho	Estonia	108.5	80.0	+2:39
41	18	Armin Bauer	Italy	107.5	79.7	+2:40
42	7	Petr Kutal	Czech Republic	108.0	78.6	+2:45
43	2	Karl-August Tiirmaa	Estonia	99.5	71.8	+3:12
44	12	Adam Loomis	United States	102.5	70.8	+3:16
45	17	Marjan Jelenko	Slovenia	100.5	66.1	+3:35
45	4	Lukáš Rypl	Czech Republic	98.0	66.1	+3:35
47	5	Ruslan Balanda	Ukraine	95.5	59.1	+4:03

=== Cross-country ===
The Cross-country was started at 15:15.

Rank	Bib	Athlete	Country	Start time	Cross country time	Cross country rank	Finish time
1st place, gold medalist(s)	1	Bernhard Gruber	Austria	0:00	22:45.8	15	22:45.8
2nd place, silver medalist(s)	3	François Braud	France	0:07	22:50.7	16	+11.9
3rd place, bronze medalist(s)	17	Johannes Rydzek	Germany	0:51	22:09.7	3	+14.9
4	14	Magnus Moan	Norway	0:47	22:13.9	4	+15.1
5	13	Bryan Fletcher	United States	0:44	22:25.2	8	+23.7
6	2	Jason Lamy Chappuis	France	0:05	23:07.8	23	+27.0
7	9	Akito Watabe	Japan	0:32	22:44.1	14	+30.3
8	19	Sébastien Lacroix	France	0:56	22:20.7	7	+30.9
9	10	Tino Edelmann	Germany	0:38	22:39.3	12	+31.5
10	6	Eric Frenzel	Germany	0:24	22:53.3	17	+31.5
11	7	Håvard Klemetsen	Norway	0:25	22:56.6	18	+35.8
12	25	Fabian Rießle	Germany	1:16	22:06.1	2	+36.3
13	23	Sepp Schneider	Austria	1:05	22:17.7	5	+36.9
14	5	Maxime Laheurte	France	0:23	23:06.9	22	+44.1
15	15	Tim Hug	Switzerland	0:47	22:43.4	13	+44.6
16	18	Ilkka Herola	Finland	0:55	22:36.8	11	+46.0
17	22	Miroslav Dvořák	Czech Republic	1:01	22:32.9	9	+48.1
18	4	Yoshito Watabe	Japan	0:12	23:22.0	31	+48.2
19	8	Christoph Bieler	Austria	0:29	23:16.1	27	+59.3
20	12	Taihei Kato	Japan	0:43	23:26.2	32	+1:23.4
21	24	Lukas Klapfer	Austria	1:06	23:05.1	21	+1:25.3
22	20	Samuel Costa	Italy	0:58	23:18.0	29	+1:30.2
23	26	Björn Kircheisen	Germany	1:17	23:00.5	20	+1:31.7
24	29	Jørgen Gråbak	Norway	1:34	22:59.4	19	+1:47.6
25	39	Alessandro Pittin	Italy	2:39	21:54.7	1	+1:47.9
26	37	Lukas Runggaldier	Italy	1:17	22:18.9	6	+1:50.1
27	28	Jim Härtull	Finland	1:27	23:09.2	24	+1:50.4
28	21	Takehiro Watanabe	Japan	1:01	23:35.7	35	+1:50.9
29	34	Taylor Fletcher	United States	2:01	22:36.5	10	+1:51.7
30	11	Tomáš Portyk	Czech Republic	0:38	24:09.3	41	+2:01.5
31	27	Jan Schmid	Norway	1:21	23:50.1	36	+2:25.3
32	32	Gašper Berlot	Slovenia	1:51	23:21.0	30	+2:26.2
33	30	Bill Demong	United States	1:44	23:29.1	34	+2:27.3
34	16	Ernest Yahin	Russia	0:50	24:27.7	43	+2:31.9
35	31	Leevi Mutru	Finland	1:45	23:58.6	40	+2:57.8
36	41	Armin Bauer	Italy	2:40	23:12.7	25	+3:06.9
37	40	Kail Piho	Estonia	2:39	23:14.5	26	+3:07.7
38	36	Kristjan Ilves	Estonia	2:12	23:55.6	38	+3:21.8
39	42	Petr Kutal	Czech Republic	2:45	23:27.9	33	+3:27.1
40	33	Viktor Pasichnyk	Ukraine	2:00	24:13.7	42	+3:27.9
41	44	Adam Loomis	United States	3:16	23:16.3	28	+3:46.5
42	35	Eetu Vähäsöyrinki	Finland	2:08	24:48.9	45	+4:11.1
43	38	Park Je-un	South Korea	2:23	24:46.8	44	+4:24.0
44	45	Marjan Jelenko	Slovenia	3:35	23:51.4	37	+4:40.6
45	46	Lukáš Rypl	Czech Republic	3:35	23:58.1	39	+4:47.3
46	43	Karl-August Tiirmaa	Estonia	3:12	24:55.4	46	+5:21.6
47	47	Ruslan Balanda	Ukraine	4:03	25:11.8	47	+6:29.0
