= FIS Nordic World Ski Championships 2015 – Individual normal hill/10 km =

Individual normal hill/10 km at the FIS Nordic World Ski Championships 2015
- Date: 20 February 2015
- Competitors: 50 from 16 nations
- Winning time: 26:38.9

Medalists
gold medal	Johannes Rydzek	Germany
silver medal	Alessandro Pittin	Italy
bronze medal	Jason Lamy-Chappuis	France

The Individual normal hill/10 km event of the FIS Nordic World Ski Championships 2015 was held on 20 February 2015.

== Results ==
=== Ski jumping ===
The ski jumping part was scheduled at 10:00, but was postponed until 13:30.

Rank	Bib	Athlete	Country	Distance (m)	Points	Time difference
1	50	Eric Frenzel	Germany	99.0	121.6	
2	35	Yoshito Watabe	Japan	95.0	116.4	+0:21
3	39	Jason Lamy Chappuis	France	94.5	115.4	+0:25
4	46	Akito Watabe	Japan	92.0	114.8	+0:27
5	45	Johannes Rydzek	Germany	93.0	113.8	+0:31
6	44	Håvard Klemetsen	Norway	95.5	112.9	+0:35
7	48	Jan Schmid	Norway	93.0	109.4	+0:49
8	31	Taihei Kato	Japan	92.0	109.0	+0:50
9	38	Tino Edelmann	Germany	91.0	107.6	+0:56
10	19	Bill Demong	United States	93.5	107.2	+0:58
11	41	Jørgen Gråbak	Norway	91.5	106.4	+1:01
12	21	Hideaki Nagai	Japan	91.0	104.7	+1:08
13	23	Samuel Costa	Italy	95.0	104.3	+1:09
14	36	Alessandro Pittin	Italy	87.0	102.5	+1:16
15	25	Tomáš Portyk	Czech Republic	89.0	102.1	+1:18
16	9	Ben Berend	United States	90.5	101.9	+1:19
17	49	Bernhard Gruber	Austria	89.5	100.5	+1:24
18	27	Tim Hug	Switzerland	88.0	100.4	+1:25
19	37	François Braud	France	88.0	100.0	+1:26
20	40	Bryan Fletcher	United States	88.5	99.8	+1:27
21	28	Sébastien Lacroix	France	87.5	99.6	+1:28
22	15	Ernest Yahin	Russia	87.5	99.5	+1:28
23	47	Fabian Rießle	Germany	89.0	99.4	+1:29
24	30	Philipp Orter	Austria	87.0	98.9	+1:31
25	29	Taylor Fletcher	United States	88.0	98.8	+1:31
26	26	Maxime Laheurte	France	87.0	98.7	+1:32
26	24	Gašper Berlot	Slovenia	89.0	98.7	+1:32
28	14	Kristjan Ilves	Estonia	86.5	98.5	+1:32
29	5	Szczepan Kupczak	Poland	90.0	97.4	+1:37
30	13	Leevi Mutru	Finland	86.0	95.2	+1:46
31	10	Karl-August Tiirmaa	Estonia	85.0	94.9	+1:47
32	33	Miroslav Dvořák	Czech Republic	84.0	94.6	+1:48
33	43	Magnus Moan	Norway	87.0	94.4	+1:49
34	18	Lukas Runggaldier	Italy	88.0	94.3	+1:49
35	34	Ilkka Herola	Finland	84.5	93.4	+1:53
36	32	Wilhelm Denifl	Austria	83.0	91.6	+2:00
37	22	Armin Bauer	Italy	88.5	91.4	+2:01
38	16	Jim Härtull	Finland	84.0	90.9	+2:03
39	3	Viktor Pasichnyk	Ukraine	86.0	89.6	+2:08
40	42	Lukas Klapfer	Austria	83.0	89.5	+2:08
41	2	Antoine Gerard	France	84.5	88.3	+2:13
42	12	Adam Cieślar	Poland	83.0	87.9	+2:15
43	7	Petr Kutal	Czech Republic	85.5	87.6	+2:16
44	6	Jussi Salo	Finland	82.0	86.6	+2:20
45	20	Marjan Jelenko	Slovenia	83.0	83.1	+2:34
46	11	Ruslan Balanda	Ukraine	79.0	80.1	+2:46
47	17	Kail Piho	Estonia	78.5	78.6	+2:52
48	1	Lukáš Rypl	Czech Republic	74.5	72.0	+3:18
49	8	Park Je-un	South Korea	75.0	70.1	+3:26
49	4	Han Hendrik Piho	Estonia	76.5	70.1	+3:26

=== Cross-country skiing ===
The cross-country skiing part was held at 16:00.

Rank	Bib	Athlete	Country	Start time	Cross country time	Cross country rank	Finish time
1st place, gold medalist(s)	5	Johannes Rydzek	Germany	0:31	26:07.9	4	
2nd place, silver medalist(s)	14	Alessandro Pittin	Italy	1:16	25:24.2	1	+1.3
3rd place, bronze medalist(s)	3	Jason Lamy Chappuis	France	0:25	26:18.9	11	+5.0
4	1	Eric Frenzel	Germany	0:00	26:45.0	20	+6.1
5	6	Håvard Klemetsen	Norway	0:35	26:13.5	8	+9.6
6	4	Akito Watabe	Japan	0:27	26:24.1	14	+12.2
7	2	Yoshito Watabe	Japan	0:21	26:32.3	17	+14.4
8	11	Jørgen Gråbak	Norway	1:01	26:30.5	15	+52.6
9	23	Fabian Rießle	Germany	1:29	26:08.6	5	+58.7
10	17	Bernhard Gruber	Austria	1:24	26:14.4	9	+59.5
11	21	Sébastien Lacroix	France	1:28	26:12.3	7	+1:01.4
12	34	Lukas Runggaldier	Italy	1:49	25:52.2	3	+1:02.3
13	19	François Braud	France	1:26	26:15.2	10	+1:02.3
14	24	Philipp Orter	Austria	1:31	26:11.1	6	+1:03.4
15	40	Lukas Klapfer	Austria	2:08	25:38.2	2	+1:07.3
16	26	Maxime Laheurte	France	1:32	26:21.0	12	+1:14.1
17	8	Taihei Kato	Japan	0:50	27:06.2	27	+1:17.3
18	12	Hideaki Nagai	Japan	1:08	26:54.3	26	+1:23.4
19	25	Taylor Fletcher	United States	1:31	26:40.4	18	+1:32.5
20	9	Tino Edelmann	Germany	0:56	27:22.5	30	+1:39.6
21	20	Bryan Fletcher	United States	1:27	26:52.8	25	+1:40.9
22	13	Samuel Costa	Italy	1:09	27:14.5	=28	+1:44.6
23	35	Ilkka Herola	Finland	1:53	26:31.2	16	+1:45.3
24	37	Armin Bauer	Italy	2:01	26:23.5	13	+1:45.6
25	10	Bill Demong	United States	0:58	27:32.7	32	+1:51.8
26	33	Magnus Moan	Norway	1:49	26:48.2	21	+1:58.3
27	18	Tim Hug	Switzerland	1:25	27:23.4	31	+2:09.5
28	36	Wilhelm Denifl	Austria	2:00	26:49.8	22	+2:10.9
29	38	Jim Härtull	Finland	2:03	26:51.1	24	+2:15.2
30	32	Miroslav Dvořák	Czech Republic	1:48	27:14.5	=28	+2:23.6
31	7	Jan Schmid	Norway	0:49	28:21.3	40	+2:31.4
32	30	Leevi Mutru	Finland	1:46	27:42.9	34	+2:50.0
33	15	Tomáš Portyk	Czech Republic	1:18	28:14.7	37	+2:53.8
34	47	Kail Piho	Estonia	2:52	26:50.4	23	+3:03.5
35	41	Antoine Gerard	France	2:13	27:33.5	33	+3:07.6
36	31	Karl-August Tiirmaa	Estonia	1:47	27:59.7	36	+3:07.8
37	29	Szczepan Kupczak	Poland	1:37	28:15.0	38	+3:13.1
38	50	Han Hendrik Piho	Estonia	3:26	26:41.3	19	+3:28.4
39	27	Gašper Berlot	Slovenia	1:32	28:42.5	41	+3:35.6
40	28	Kristjan Ilves	Estonia	1:32	28:43.0	42	+3:36.1
41	43	Petr Kutal	Czech Republic	2:16	27:59.1	35	+3:36.2
42	44	Jussi Salo	Finland	2:20	28:18.7	39	+3:59.8
43	22	Ernest Yahin	Russia	1:28	29:13.0	46	+4:02.1
44	39	Viktor Pasichnyk	Ukraine	2:08	28:44.4	43	+4:13.5
45	16	Ben Berend	United States	1:19	30:14.5	49	+4:54.6
46	45	Marjan Jelenko	Slovenia	2:34	28:59.8	45	+4:54.9
47	48	Lukáš Rypl	Czech Republic	3:18	28:49.9	44	+5:29.0
48	46	Ruslan Balanda	Ukraine	2:46	29:26.6	47	+5:33.7
49	49	Park Je-un	South Korea	3:26	29:57.5	48	+6:44.6
	42	Adam Cieślar	Poland	2:15	DNS		
