= FIS Nordic World Ski Championships 2015 – Team normal hill/4 × 5 km =

Team normal hill/4 × 5 km at the FIS Nordic World Ski Championships 2015
- Date: 22 February 2015
- Competitors: 40 from 10 nations
- Winning time: 44:20.7

Medalists
gold medal	Tino Edelmann; Eric Frenzel; Fabian Rießle; Johannes Rydzek	Germany
silver medal	Magnus Moan; Håvard Klemetsen; Mikko Kokslien; Jørgen Graabak	Norway
bronze medal	François Braud; Maxime Laheurte; Sébastien Lacroix; Jason Lamy-Chappuis	France

The Team normal hill/4 × 5 km event of the FIS Nordic World Ski Championships 2015 was held on 22 February 2015.

== Results ==
=== Ski jumping ===
The ski jumping was started at 10:01, but was meant to start at 10:00 but the officials were late.

Rank	Bib	Country	Distance (m)	Points	Time difference
1	9	Germany; Tino Edelmann; Fabian Rießle; Johannes Rydzek; Eric Frenzel	93.5; 93.5; 97.0; 92.5	448.3; 112.5; 109.1; 117.0; 109.7	
2	6	Japan; Taihei Kato; Hideaki Nagai; Akito Watabe; Yoshito Watabe	93.5; 94.0; 99.5; 90.5	445.5; 107.8; 110.7; 121.0; 106.0	+0:04
3	7	France; François Braud; Sébastien Lacroix; Maxime Laheurte; Jason Lamy-Chappuis	96.5; 90.5; 92.0; 97.5	438.1; 116.4; 101.1; 105.0; 115.6	+0:14
4	8	Austria; Bernhard Gruber; Philipp Orter; Sepp Schneider; Lukas Klapfer	93.0; 93.5; 94.0; 86.0	427.6; 112.2; 107.2; 111.3; 96.9	+0:28
5	10	Norway; Jørgen Graabak; Mikko Kokslien; Magnus Moan; Håvard Klemetsen	90.5; 91.0; 91.0; 101.0	427.5; 106.4; 102.1; 99.6; 119.4	+0:28
6	5	Italy; Samuel Costa; Lukas Runggaldier; Armin Bauer; Alessandro Pittin	92.5; 84.5; 85.0; 87.5	383.4; 108.3; 92.8; 90.3; 92.0	+1:27
7	3	Czech Republic; Petr Kutal; Lukáš Rypl; Miroslav Dvořák; Tomáš Portyk	87.5; 80.5; 90.0; 90.0	376.0; 94.2; 77.6; 102.8; 101.4	+1:36
8	4	United States; Bill Demong; Adam Loomis; Taylor Fletcher; Bryan Fletcher	87.0; 83.5; 90.0; 89.0	374.0; 95.1; 91.1; 98.8; 89.0	+1:39
9	2	Finland; Leevi Mutru; Eetu Vähäsöyrinki; Jim Härtull; Ilkka Herola	89.5; 83.0; 87.0; 83.0	364.8; 99.1; 87.2; 93.9; 84.6	+1:51
10	1	Estonia; Kail Piho; Karl-August Tiirmaa; Kristjan Ilves; Han Hendrik Piho	83.0; 91.0; 91.0; 74.0	348.4; 85.8; 100.9; 99.8; 61.9	+2:13

=== Cross-country skiing ===
The cross-country skiing was started at 16:00.

Rank	Bib	Country	Deficit	Time	Rank	Deficit
1st place, gold medalist(s)	1	Germany; Tino Edelmann; Eric Frenzel; Fabian Rießle; Johannes Rydzek	0:00	44:20.7; 11:08.9; 11:03.5; 10:57.1; 11:11.2	3	
2nd place, silver medalist(s)	5	Norway; Magnus Moan; Håvard Klemetsen; Mikko Kokslien; Jørgen Graabak	0:28	44:43.8; 10:45.3; 11:17.0; 10:45.9; 11:27.6	2	+23.1
3rd place, bronze medalist(s)	3	France; François Braud; Maxime Laheurte; Sébastien Lacroix; Jason Lamy-Chappuis	0:14	45:00.3; 11:03.5; 11:15.2; 10:52.6; 11:35.0	4	+39.6
4	6	Italy; Armin Bauer; Lukas Runggaldier; Samuel Costa; Alessandro Pittin	1:27	45:30.8; 11:02.8; 10:56.5; 11:12.6; 10:51.9	1	+1:10.1
5	4	Austria; Philipp Orter; Lukas Klapfer; Bernhard Gruber; Sepp Schneider	0:28	45:31.2; 11:01.4; 11:11.8; 11:01.2; 11:48.8	5	+1:10.5
6	2	Japan; Taihei Kato; Yoshito Watabe; Hideaki Nagai; Akito Watabe	0:04	45:32.2; 11:17.0; 11:27.6; 11:20.7; 11:22.9	7	+1:11.5
7	8	United States; Bryan Fletcher; Taylor Fletcher; Adam Loomis; Bill Demong	1:39	46:58.5; 10:54.9; 10.52.7; 11:19.2; 12:12.7	6	+2:37.8
8	7	Czech Republic; Tomáš Portyk; Petr Kutal; Lukáš Rypl; Miroslav Dvořák	1:36	48:07.1; 11:38.1; 11:37.4; 11:38.5; 11:37.1	8	+3:46.4
9	9	Finland; Leevi Mutru; Eetu Vähäsöyrinki; Ilkka Herola; Jim Härtull	1:51	48:28.7; 11:46.2; 11:48.1; 11:23.1; 11:40.3	9	+4:08.0
10	10	Estonia; Kail Piho; Kristjan Ilves; Karl-August Tiirmaa; Han Hendrik Piho	2:13	49:46.5; 11:24.4; 11:47.3; 12:11.1; 12:10.7	10	+5:25.8
