= FIS Nordic World Ski Championships 2017 – Individual normal hill/10 km =

Individual normal hill/10 km at the FIS Nordic World Ski Championships 2017
- Venue: Salpausselkä
- Location: Lahti, Finland
- Date: 24 February
- Competitors: 55 from 18 nations
- Winning time: 26:19.6

Medalists
gold medal	Johannes Rydzek	Germany
silver medal	Eric Frenzel	Germany
bronze medal	Björn Kircheisen	Germany

The Individual normal hill/10 km event of the FIS Nordic World Ski Championships 2017 was held on 24 February 2017.

== Results ==
=== Ski jumping ===
The ski jumping part was held at 10:30.

Rank	Bib	Name	Country	Distance (m)	Points	Time difference
1	54	Eric Frenzel	Germany	99.0	128.1	
2	55	Johannes Rydzek	Germany	99.0	124.5	+0:14
3	26	Kristjan Ilves	Estonia	98.0	122.2	+0:24
4	45	Bernhard Gruber	Austria	95.5	121.6	+0:26
5	50	Mario Seidl	Austria	95.5	120.8	+0:29
6	52	Akito Watabe	Japan	95.5	120.3	+0:31
7	46	Eero Hirvonen	Finland	95.0	119.9	+0:33
8	51	Björn Kircheisen	Germany	94.0	119.7	+0:34
9	38	Hideaki Nagai	Japan	95.5	119.6	+0:34
9	37	François Braud	France	94.5	119.6	+0:34
11	20	Marjan Jelenko	Slovenia	98.0	118.7	+0:38
12	53	Fabian Rießle	Germany	94.5	118.2	+0:40
13	42	Manuel Faißt	Germany	93.5	117.8	+0:41
14	44	Tim Hug	Switzerland	94.5	116.4	+0:47
15	39	David Pommer	Austria	93.5	115.7	+0:50
16	32	Bryan Fletcher	United States	93.5	114.0	+0:56
17	35	Yoshito Watabe	Japan	92.5	113.8	+0:57
18	43	Espen Andersen	Norway	89.5	113.7	+0:58
19	21	Adam Cieślar	Poland	93.0	112.9	+1:01
20	19	Karl-August Tiirmaa	Estonia	92.5	111.9	+1:05
21	23	Ernest Yahin	Russia	93.5	110.9	+1:09
22	9	Ben Berend	United States	92.0	110.8	+1:09
23	48	Jørgen Gråbak	Norway	91.5	111.5	+1:10
24	36	Mikko Kokslien	Norway	89.5	110.3	+1:11
25	30	Maxime Laheurte	France	89.5	109.7	+1:14
25	24	Viacheslav Barkov	Russia	92.0	109.7	+1:14
27	49	Ilkka Herola	Finland	90.0	109.3	+1:15
28	41	Magnus Krog	Norway	89.5	107.8	+1:21
29	47	Samuel Costa	Italy	90.5	107.6	+1:22
30	40	Philipp Orter	Austria	90.5	107.3	+1:23
31	33	Antoine Gérard	France	90.5	106.6	+1:26
32	34	Takehiro Watanabe	Japan	92.0	106.0	+1:28
32	22	Arttu Mäkiaho	Finland	89.0	106.0	+1:28
34	10	Jan Vytrval	Czech Republic	90.5	105.5	+1:30
35	31	Leevi Mutru	Finland	90.0	105.0	+1:32
36	17	Paweł Słowiok	Poland	88.5	103.6	+1:38
37	29	Miroslav Dvořák	Czech Republic	88.5	103.3	+1:39
38	27	Alessandro Pittin	Italy	90.0	102.4	+1:43
38	16	Adam Loomis	United States	88.5	102.4	+1:43
40	4	Lukáš Daněk	Czech Republic	88.0	102.3	+1:43
41	14	Nathaniel Mah	Canada	88.5	101.4	+1:47
42	13	Viktor Pasichnyk	Ukraine	86.5	100.3	+1:51
43	28	Tomáš Portyk	Czech Republic	90.0	100.0	+1:52
44	15	Lukas Runggaldier	Italy	86.5	99.0	+1:56
45	8	Vid Vrhovnik	Slovenia	85.5	98.3	+1:59
46	11	Armin Bauer	Italy	86.5	96.8	+2:05
47	25	Taylor Fletcher	United States	85.0	94.1	+2:16
48	12	Samir Mastiev	Russia	85.5	92.6	+2:22
49	7	Niyaz Nabeev	Russia	81.5	90.6	+2:30
50	18	Park Je-un	South Korea	81.0	88.5	+2:38
51	2	Dmytro Mazurchuk	Ukraine	82.5	88.0	+2:40
52	5	Han Hendrik Piho	Estonia	80.5	87.5	+2:42
53	6	Kail Piho	Estonia	76.5	82.3	+3:03
54	1	Hugo Buffard	France	79.0	80.7	+3:10
55	3	Chingiz Rakparov	Kazakhstan	77.0	78.0	+3:20

=== Cross-country skiing ===
The cross-country skiing part was held at 13:30.

Rank	Bib	Athlete	Country	Start time	Cross country time	Cross country rank	Finish time
1st place, gold medalist(s)	2	Johannes Rydzek	Germany	0:14	26:05.6	9	26:19.6
2nd place, silver medalist(s)	1	Eric Frenzel	Germany	0:00	26:34.5	20	26:34.5
3rd place, bronze medalist(s)	8	Björn Kircheisen	Germany	0:34	26:15.6	13	26:49.6
4	12	Fabian Rießle	Germany	0:40	26:11.8	12	26:51.8
5	6	Akito Watabe	Japan	0:31	26:20.9	15	26:51.9
6	10	François Braud	France	0:34	26:21.6	16	26:55.6
7	4	Bernhard Gruber	Austria	0:26	26:32.7	19	26:58.7
8	30	Philipp Orter	Austria	1:23	25:36.9	1	26:59.9
9	7	Eero Hirvonen	Finland	0:33	26:31.7	17	27:04.7
10	28	Magnus Krog	Norway	1:21	25:43.9	4	27:04.9
11	23	Jørgen Gråbak	Norway	1:10	25:56.4	7	27:06.4
12	27	Ilkka Herola	Finland	1:15	25:51.5	5	27:06.5
13	24	Mikko Kokslien	Norway	1:11	25:55.8	6	27:06.8
14	16	Bryan Fletcher	United States	0:56	26:11.0	11	27:07.0
15	14	Tim Hug	Switzerland	0:47	26:20.7	14	27:07.7
16	15	David Pommer	Austria	0:50	26:32.3	18	27:22.3
17	13	Manuel Faißt	Germany	0:41	26:50.5	22	27:31.5
18	5	Mario Seidl	Austria	0:29	27:04.2	27	27:33.2
19	38	Alessandro Pittin	Italy	1:43	26:08.9	10	27:51.9
20	9	Hideaki Nagai	Japan	0:34	27:19.5	32	27:53.5
21	47	Taylor Fletcher	United States	2:16	25:42.0	3	27:58.0
22	44	Lukas Runggaldier	Italy	1:56	26:05.2	8	28:01.2
23	3	Kristjan Ilves	Estonia	0:24	27:44.3	40	28:08.3
24	26	Viacheslav Barkov	Russia	1:14	26:56.3	24	28:10.3
25	18	Espen Andersen	Norway	0:58	27:21.3	33	28:19.3
26	31	Antoine Gérard	France	1:26	26:54.0	23	28:20.0
27	25	Maxime Laheurte	France	1:14	27:06.9	28	28:20.9
28	37	Miroslav Dvořák	Czech Republic	1:39	26:47.7	21	28:26.7
29	19	Adam Cieślar	Poland	1:01	27:27.5	34	28:28.5
30	29	Samuel Costa	Italy	1:22	27:08.3	29	28:30.3
31	35	Leevi Mutru	Finland	1:32	26:58.9	25	28:30.9
32	21	Ernest Yahin	Russia	1:09	27:32.4	36	28:41.4
33	39	Adam Loomis	United States	1:43	27:00.2	26	28:43.2
34	32	Takehiro Watanabe	Japan	1:28	27:18.5	31	28:46.5
35	54	Hugo Buffard	France	3:10	25:39.1	2	28:49.1
36	20	Karl-August Tiirmaa	Estonia	1:05	27:47.2	41	28:52.2
37	36	Paweł Słowiok	Poland	1:38	27:18.2	30	28:67.2
38	33	Arttu Mäkiaho	Finland	1:28	27:47.4	42	29:15.4
39	42	Viktor Pasichnyk	Ukraine	1:51	27:37.4	39	29:28.4
40	43	Tomáš Portyk	Czech Republic	1:52	27:36.6	37	29:28.6
41	22	Ben Berend	United States	1:09	28:21.4	44	29:30.4
42	11	Marjan Jelenko	Slovenia	0.38	28:58.6	46	29:36.6
43	48	Samir Mastiev	Russia	2:22	27:36.8	38	29:58.8
44	17	Yoshito Watabe	Japan	0:57	29:05.5	47	30:02.5
45	53	Kail Piho	Estonia	3:03	27:29.2	35	30:32.2
46	46	Armin Bauer	Italy	2:05	28:41.8	45	30:46.8
47	52	Han Hendrik Piho	Estonia	2:42	28:05.0	43	30:47.0
48	34	Jan Vytrval	Czech Republic	1:30	29:29.1	49	30:59.1
49	45	Vid Vrhovnik	Slovenia	1:59	29:35.0	50	31:34.0
50	40	Lukáš Daněk	Czech Republic	1:43	30:03.0	53	31:46.0
51	50	Park Je-un	South Korea	2:38	29:17.2	48	31:55.2
52	51	Dmytro Mazurchuk	Ukraine	2:40	29:40.5	51	32:20.5
53	49	Niyaz Nabeev	Russia	2:30	30:24.9	54	32:54.9
54	55	Chingiz Rakparov	Kazakhstan	3:20	29:44.5	52	33:04.5
	41	Nathaniel Mah	Canada	1:47	Did not finish		
