= FIS Nordic World Ski Championships 2015 – Team sprint large hill/2 × 7,5 km =

Team sprint large hill/2 × 7.5 km at the FIS Nordic World Ski Championships 2015
- Date: 28 February 2015
- Competitors: 24 from 12 nations
- Winning time: 38:31.6

Medalists
gold medal	François Braud; Jason Lamy-Chappuis	France
silver medal	Johannes Rydzek; Eric Frenzel	Germany
bronze medal	Magnus Moan; Håvard Klemetsen	Norway

The Team sprint large hill/2 × 7.5 km event of the FIS Nordic World Ski Championships 2015 was held on 28 February 2015.

== Results ==
=== Ski jumping ===
The ski jumping was started at 10:00.

Rank	Bib	Country	Distance (m)	Points	Time difference
1	9	France; François Braud; Jason Lamy-Chappuis	126.0; 126.0	227.1; 113.7; 113.4	
2	8	Japan; Akito Watabe; Yoshito Watabe	128.5; 124.5	221.4; 110.0; 111.4	+0:11
3	11	Germany; Johannes Rydzek; Eric Frenzel	118.5; 128.0	216.5; 101.8; 114.7	+0:21
4	12	Norway; Magnus Moan; Håvard Klemetsen	127.5; 123.0	205.2; 100.1; 105.1	+0:44
5	5	Czech Republic; Miroslav Dvořák; Tomáš Portyk	123.5; 116.0	199.7; 104.2; 95.5	+0:55
6	4	Finland; Jim Härtull; Ilkka Herola	117.5; 116.5	187.5; 92.1; 95.4	+1:19
7	10	Austria; Sepp Schneider; Bernhard Gruber	114.5; 117.0	181.3; 88.3; 93.0	+1:32
8	7	Italy; Samuel Costa; Alessandro Pittin	121.5; 108.5	181.2; 100.6; 80.6	+1:32
9	3	Slovenia; Marjan Jelenko; Gašper Berlot	113.5; 116.0	171.1; 78.5; 92.6	+1:52
10	6	United States; Taylor Fletcher; Bryan Fletcher	117.0; 98.5	165.0; 95.1; 69.6	+2:04
11	2	Estonia; Kail Piho; Kristjan Ilves	94.5; 114.5	147.9; 58.4; 89.5	+2:38
12	1	Ukraine; Ruslan Balanda; Viktor Pasichnyk	102.0; 109.5	146.9; 66.5; 80.4	+2:40

=== Cross-country skiing ===
The Cross-country skiing was started at 16:00.

Rank	Bib	Country	Deficit	Time	Rank	Deficit
1st place, gold medalist(s)	1	France; François Braud; Jason Lamy-Chappuis	0:00	38:31.6; 18:49.2; 19:42.5	6	
2nd place, silver medalist(s)	3	Germany; Eric Frenzel; Johannes Rydzek	0:21	38:13.3; 19:02.3; 19:11.0	2	+2.7
3rd place, bronze medalist(s)	4	Norway; Magnus Moan; Håvard Klemetsen	0:44	38:07.0; 18:15.2; 19:51.8	1	+19.4
4	6	Finland; Ilkka Herola; Jim Härtull	1:19	38:16.8; 19:02.1; 19:14.7	3	+1:04.2
5	8	Italy; Samuel Costa; Alessandro Pittin	1:32	38:18.3; 19:52.6; 18:25.7	4	+1:18.7
6	2	Japan; Yoshito Watabe; Akito Watabe	0:11	39:46.3; 20:04.8; 19:41.5	10	+1:25.7
7	7	Austria; Sepp Schneider; Bernhard Gruber	1:32	38:40.5; 19:10.6; 19:29.9	7	+1:40.9
8	5	Czech Republic; Tomáš Portyk; Miroslav Dvořák	0:55	39:27.0; 20:16.3; 19:10.7	8	+1:50.4
9	10	United States; Bryan Fletcher; Taylor Fletcher	2:04	38:27.5; 19:11.8; 19:15.7	5	+1:59.9
10	9	Slovenia; Marjan Jelenko; Gašper Berlot	1:52	40:13.8; 20:19.8; 19:54.0	11	+3:34.2
11	11	Estonia; Kristjan Ilves; Kail Piho	2:38	39:30.1; 19:59.7; 19:30.4	9	+3:36.5
12	12	Ukraine; Ruslan Balanda; Viktor Pasichnyk	2:40	42:12.3; 21:05.9; 21:06.4	12	+6:20.7
