= FIS Nordic World Ski Championships 2017 – Individual large hill/10 km =

Individual large hill/10 km at the FIS Nordic World Ski Championships 2017
- Venue: Salpausselkä
- Location: Lahti, Finland
- Date: 1 March
- Competitors: 55 from 18 nations
- Winning time: 26:41.6

Medalists
gold medal	Johannes Rydzek	Germany
silver medal	Akito Watabe	Japan
bronze medal	François Braud	France

The Individual large hill/10 km event of the FIS Nordic World Ski Championships 2017 was held on 1 March 2017.

== Results ==
=== Ski jumping ===
The ski jumping part was held at 12:00.

Rank	Bib	Name	Country	Distance (m)	Points	Time difference
1	50	Mario Seidl	Austria	132.0	137.3	
2	44	Wilhelm Denifl	Austria	125.5	125.7	+0:46
3	52	Akito Watabe	Japan	125.0	123.8	+0:54
3	37	François Braud	France	122.5	123.8	+0:54
5	55	Johannes Rydzek	Germany	122.0	122.2	+1:00
6	34	Takehiro Watanabe	Japan	125.0	121.4	+1:04
7	33	Antoine Gérard	France	125.0	121.3	+1:04
8	45	Bernhard Gruber	Austria	121.0	118.3	+1:16
9	42	Espen Andersen	Norway	120.5	118.0	+1:17
10	35	Magnus Moan	Norway	122.0	117.1	+1:21
11	43	Tim Hug	Switzerland	120.5	115.9	+1:26
12	36	Yoshito Watabe	Japan	119.5	115.6	+1:27
13	54	Eric Frenzel	Germany	121.0	115.0	+1:29
14	39	David Pommer	Austria	119.5	114.4	+1:32
15	40	Philipp Orter	Austria	119.5	113.8	+1:34
16	41	Magnus Krog	Norway	120.5	113.7	+1:34
17	53	Fabian Rießle	Germany	119.5	112.9	+1:38
18	51	Björn Kircheisen	Germany	118.5	111.4	+1:44
19	31	Leevi Mutru	Finland	118.0	110.3	+1:48
20	47	Samuel Costa	Italy	117.5	108.9	+1:54
21	4	Ben Berend	United States	116.5	108.6	+1:55
22	49	Ilkka Herola	Finland	117.5	108.4	+1:56
23	19	Marjan Jelenko	Slovenia	116.5	108.2	+1:56
24	26	Kristjan Ilves	Estonia	115.0	105.2	+2:08
25	46	Eero Hirvonen	Finland	113.5	104.0	+2:13
26	28	Tomáš Portyk	Czech Republic	113.0	103.4	+2:16
27	22	Hannu Manninen	Finland	112.5	99.7	+2:30
28	48	Jørgen Graabak	Norway	112.0	99.1	+2:33
29	23	Ernest Yahin	Russia	110.0	98.9	+2:34
30	27	Alessandro Pittin	Italy	110.5	97.7	+2:38
31	32	Bryan Fletcher	United States	111.5	97.5	+2:39
32	12	Timofey Borisov	Russia	111.5	96.7	+2:42
33	21	Adam Cieślar	Poland	109.5	96.4	+2:44
34	24	Viacheslav Barkov	Russia	111.5	94.2	+2:52
35	6	Lukáš Daněk	Czech Republic	111.5	93.9	+2:54
36	10	Armin Bauer	Italy	110.0	93.7	+2:54
37	20	Ondřej Pažout	Czech Republic	108.5	92.5	+2:59
38	38	Hideaki Nagai	Japan	107.5	91.4	+3:04
39	14	Vid Vrhovnik	Slovenia	108.0	89.6	+3:11
39	7	Viktor Pasichnyk	Ukraine	109.5	89.6	+3:11
41	13	Raffaele Buzzi	Italy	107.5	89.0	+3:13
42	15	Paweł Słowiok	Poland	107.0	87.4	+3:20
43	18	Laurent Muhlethaler	France	106.0	87.3	+3:20
44	17	Karl-August Tiirmaa	Estonia	107.0	86.6	+3:23
45	9	Adam Loomis	United States	103.5	85.1	+3:29
46	29	Miroslav Dvořák	Czech Republic	105.5	84.4	+3:32
47	5	Samir Mastiev	Russia	101.0	80.9	+3:46
48	11	Han Hendrik Piho	Estonia	100.0	77.8	+3:58
49	3	Dmytro Mazurchuk	Ukraine	100.5	74.3	+4:12
50	16	Park Je-un	South Korea	99.0	72.7	+4:18
51	25	Taylor Fletcher	United States	98.5	70.7	+4:26
52	1	Nathaniel Mah	Canada	94.0	65.3	+4:48
53	8	Kail Piho	Estonia	92.0	63.1	+4:57
54	2	Chingiz Rakparov	Kazakhstan	80.0	35.1	+6:49
—	30	Maxime Laheurte	France	DSQ		

=== Cross-country skiing ===
The cross-country skiing part was held at 16:15.

Rank	Bib	Athlete	Country	Start time	Cross country time	Cross country rank	Finish time	Deficit
1st place, gold medalist(s)	5	Johannes Rydzek	Germany	1:00	25:41.6	2	26:41.6	
2nd place, silver medalist(s)	3	Akito Watabe	Japan	0:54	25:52.4	5	26:46.4	+4.8
3rd place, bronze medalist(s)	4	François Braud	France	0:54	26:00.6	7	26:54.6	+13.0
4	1	Mario Seidl	Austria	0:00	26:59.0	20	26:59.0	+17.4
5	2	Wilhelm Denifl	Austria	0:46	26:22.1	13	27:08.1	+26.5
6	17	Fabian Rießle	Germany	1:38	25:40.5	1	27:18.5	+36.9
7	13	Eric Frenzel	Germany	1:29	25:50.1	4	27:19.1	+37.5
8	14	David Pommer	Austria	1:32	25:47.3	3	27:19.3	+37.7
9	8	Bernhard Gruber	Austria	1:16	26:03.9	9	27:19.9	+38.3
10	9	Espen Andersen	Norway	1:17	26:15.2	11	27:32.2	+50.6
11	16	Magnus Krog	Norway	1:34	25:59.5	6	27:33.5	+51.9
12	15	Philipp Orter	Austria	1:34	26:01.3	8	27:35.3	+53.7
13	10	Magnus Moan	Norway	1:21	26:20.7	12	27:41.7	+1:00.1
14	11	Tim Hug	Switzerland	1:26	26:26.1	14	27:52.1	+1:10.5
15	12	Yoshito Watabe	Japan	1:27	26:30.5	16	27:57.5	+1:15.9
16	18	Björn Kircheisen	Germany	1:44	26:39.4	18	28:23.4	+1:41.8
17	22	Ilkka Herola	Finland	1:56	26:34.2	17	28:30.2	+1:48.6
18	7	Antoine Gérard	France	1:04	27:33.0	30	28:37.0	+1:55.4
19	6	Takehiro Watanabe	Japan	1:04	27:33.9	31	28:37.9	+1:56.3
20	30	Alessandro Pittin	Italy	2:38	26:07.7	10	28:45.7	+2:04.1
21	25	Eero Hirvonen	Finland	2:13	26:44.1	19	28:57.1	+2:15.5
22	28	Jørgen Graabak	Norway	2:33	26:26.1	14	28:59.1	+2:17.5
23	19	Leevi Mutru	Finland	1:48	27:27.1	28	29:15.1	+2:33.5
24	27	Hannu Manninen	Finland	2:30	27:00.0	21	29:30.0	+2:48.4
25	20	Samuel Costa	Italy	1:54	27:58.9	35	29:52.9	+3:11.3
26	33	Adam Cieślar	Poland	2:44	27:25.9	27	30:09.9	+3:28.3
27	24	Kristjan Ilves	Estonia	2:08	28:04.8	37	30:12.8	+3:31.2
28	36	Armin Bauer	Italy	2:54	27:20.0	26	30:14.0	+3:32.4
29	38	Hideaki Nagai	Japan	3:04	27:13.3	24	30:17.3	+3:35.7
30	40	Viktor Pasichnyk	Ukraine	3:11	27:13.1	23	30:24.1	+3:42.5
31	31	Bryan Fletcher	United States	2:39	28:00.9	36	30:39.9	+3:58.3
32	34	Viacheslav Barkov	Russia	2:52	27:53.3	34	30:45.3	+4:03.7
33	42	Paweł Słowiok	Poland	3:20	27:29.8	29	30:49.8	+4:08.2
34	26	Tomáš Portyk	Czech Republic	2:16	29:11.7	42	31:27.7	+4:46.1
35	47	Samir Mastiev	Russia	3:46	27:41.8	32	31:27.8	+4:46.2
36	51	Taylor Fletcher	United States	4:26	27:11.2	22	31:37.2	+4:55.6
37	41	Raffaele Buzzi	Italy	3:13	28:24.5	39	31:37.5	+4:55.9
38	43	Laurent Muhlethaler	France	3:20	28:23.5	38	31:43.5	+5:01.9
39	48	Han Hendrik Piho	Estonia	3:58	27:46.9	33	31:44.9	+5:03.3
40	21	Ben Berend	United States	1:55	29:55.2	45	31:50.2	+5:08.6
41	29	Ernest Yahin	Russia	2:34	29:20.7	43	31:54.7	+5:13.1
42	46	Miroslav Dvořák	Czech Republic	3:32	28:26.3	40	31:58.3	+5:16.7
43	53	Kail Piho	Estonia	4:57	27:19.0	25	32:16.0	+5:34.4
44	45	Adam Loomis	United States	3:29	29:00.5	41	32:29.5	+5:47.9
45	44	Karl-August Tiirmaa	Estonia	3:23	29:24.9	44	32:47.9	+6:06.3
46	37	Ondřej Pažout	Czech Republic	2:59	30:02.6	46	33:01.6	+6:20.0
47	39	Vid Vrhovnik	Slovenia	3:11	30:54.1	48	34:05.1	+7:23.5
48	32	Timofey Borisov	Russia	2:42	31:31.7	50	34:13.7	+7:32.1
49	35	Lukáš Daněk	Czech Republic	2:54	31:33.6	51	34:27.6	+7:46.0
50	50	Park Je-un	South Korea	4:18	30:10.0	47	34:28.0	+7:46.4
51	49	Dmytro Mazurchuk	Ukraine	4:12	31:07.0	49	35:19.0	+8:37.4
52	52	Nathaniel Mah	Canada	4:48	Lapped			
53	54	Chingiz Rakparov	Kazakhstan	6:49	Lapped			
	23	Marjan Jelenko	Slovenia	1:56	Did not finish			
