= 2012–13 FIS Nordic Combined World Cup =

International skiing competition

Nordic Combined World Cup 2012/13
Winners
- Overall: (Germany) Eric Frenzel
- Nations Cup: Germany

Competitions
- Venues: 11
- Individual: 17
- Team: 5
- Cancelled: 2

The 2012/13 FIS Nordic Combined World Cup was the 30th world cup season, a combination of ski jumping and cross-country skiing organized by FIS. It started on 24 November 2012 in Lillehammer, Norway and ended on 16 March 2013 in Oslo, Norway.

== Calendar ==
=== Men ===
Num	Season	Date	Place	Hill	Discipline	Winner	Second	Third	Ref.
391	1	24 November 2012	(Norway) Lillehammer	Lysgårdsbakken	HS100 / 10 km	(Norway) Magnus Moan	(France) Jason Lamy-Chappuis	(Austria) Bernhard Gruber	
392	2	25 November 2012	(Norway) Lillehammer	Lysgårdsbakken	HS138 / Penalty Race	(Norway) Magnus Moan	(Norway) Haavard Klemetsen	(Germany) Eric Frenzel	
393	3	1 December 2012	(Finland) Kuusamo	Rukatunturi	HS142 / 10 km	(France) Jason Lamy-Chappuis	(Norway) Magnus Krog	(France) Sébastien Lacroix	
		8 December 2012	(Turkey) Erzurum	Kiremitliktepe	HS140 / 10 km	financial reasons			
		9 December 2012	(Turkey) Erzurum	Kiremitliktepe	HS140 / 10 km	financial reasons			
394	4	15 December 2012	(Austria) Ramsau	W90-Mattensprunganlage	HS98 / 10 km	(Norway) Magnus Moan	(Norway) Mikko Kokslien	(Germany) Fabian Rießle	
395	5	16 December 2012	(Austria) Ramsau	W90-Mattensprunganlage	HS98 / 10 km	(Norway) Mikko Kokslien	(France) Jason Lamy-Chappuis	(Austria) Mario Stecher	
396	6	6 January 2013	(Germany) Schonach	Langenwaldschanze	HS106 / 10 km	(France) Jason Lamy-Chappuis	(Japan) Akito Watabe	(Norway) Magnus Moan	
397	7	12 January 2013	(France) Chaux-Neuve	La Côté Feuillée	HS118 / 10 km	(Germany) Tino Edelmann	(Austria) Bernhard Gruber	(Japan) Akito Watabe	
398	8	19 January 2013	(Austria) Seefeld	Toni-Seelos-Olympiaschanze	HS109 / 10 km	(Germany) Eric Frenzel	(Norway) Magnus Moan	(Germany) Tino Edelmann	
399	9	20 Jan 2013	(Austria) Seefeld	Toni-Seelos-Olympiaschanze	HS109 / 10 km	(Germany) Eric Frenzel	(Norway) Mikko Kokslien	(United States) Taylor Fletcher	
400	10	26 January 2013	(Germany) Klingenthal	Vogtland Arena	HS140 / 10 km	(Germany) Eric Frenzel	(Germany) Tino Edelmann	(Austria) Wilhelm Denifl	
401	11	27 January 2013	(Germany) Klingenthal	Vogtland Arena	HS140 / Penalty Race	(Germany) Eric Frenzel	(Germany) Tino Edelmann	(Germany) Johannes Rydzek	
402	12	2 February 2013	(Russia) Sochi	RusSki Gorki	HS140 / 10 km	(Austria) Bernhard Gruber	(Germany) Eric Frenzel	(Austria) Wilhelm Denifl	
403	13	9 February 2013	(Kazakhstan) Almaty	Gorney Gigant	HS140 / 10 km	(Germany) Björn Kircheisen	(Japan) Akito Watabe	(Austria) Christoph Bieler	
404	14	10 February 2013	(Kazakhstan) Almaty	Gorney Gigant	HS140 / 10 km	(Austria) Christoph Bieler	(Japan) Akito Watabe	(Czech Republic) Miroslav Dvořák	
FIS Nordic World Ski Championships 2013
405	15	8 March 2013	(Finland) Lahti	Salpausselkä	HS130 / 10 km	(Germany) Eric Frenzel	(Japan) Akito Watabe	(Japan) Taihei Kato	
406	16	15 March 2013	(Norway) Oslo	Holmenkollbakken	HS134 / 10 km	(Germany) Eric Frenzel	(Japan) Akito Watabe	(Japan) Yoshito Watabe	
407	17	16 March 2013	(Norway) Oslo	Holmenkollbakken	HS134 / 15 km	(France) Jason Lamy-Chappuis	(Germany) Eric Frenzel	(Austria) Wilhelm Denifl	

=== Team ===
Num	Season	Date	Place	Hill	Discipline	Winner	Second	Third	Ref.
16	1	2 December 2012	(Finland) Kuusamo	Rukatunturi	HS142 / 2 x 7.5 km Sprint	Austria I Bernhard Gruber; Mario Stecher	Norway II Haavard Klemetsen; Mikko Kokslien	France I Sébastien Lacroix; Jason Lamy-Chappuis	
17	2	5 January 2013	(Germany) Schonach	Langenwaldschanze	HS106 / 4 x 5 km	Norway Haavard Klemetsen; Magnus Moan; Mikko Kokslien; Jørgen Gråbak	Germany Johannes Rydzek; Tino Edelmann; Björn Kircheisen; Eric Frenzel	United States Bryan Fletcher; Taylor Fletcher; Todd Lodwick; Bill Demong	
18	3	13 January 2013	(France) Chaux-Neuve	La Côté Feuillée	HS118 / 2 x 7.5 km Sprint	Germany I Eric Frenzel; Tino Edelmann	Norway I Magnus Moan; Jørgen Gråbak	France I Sébastien Lacroix; Jason Lamy-Chappuis	
19	4	3 February 2013	(Russia) Sochi	RusSki Gorki	HS140 / 4 x 5 km	Germany Manuel Faißt; Johannes Rydzek; Björn Kircheisen; Eric Frenzel	France Sebastien Lacroix; François Braud; Maxime Laheurte; Jason Lamy Chappuis	Austria Bernhard Gruber; Tomaz Druml; Lukas Klapfer; Wilhelm Denifl	
20	5	9 March 2013	(Finland) Lahti	Salpausselkä	HS130 / 2 x 7.5 km Sprint	Germany I Johannes Rydzek; Eric Frenzel	Germany II Tino Edelmann; Fabian Rießle	Norway I Håvard Klemetsen; Mikko Kokslien	

== Standings ==
=== Overall ===
Rank		Points
1	(Germany) Eric Frenzel	1034
2	(France) Jason Lamy-Chappuis	818
3	(Japan) Akito Watabe	721
4	(Austria) Bernhard Gruber	619
5	(Norway) Magnus Moan	592
6	(Germany) Tino Edelmann	523
7	(Norway) Mikko Kokslien	454
8	(Austria) Wilhelm Denifl	418
9	(Germany) Johannes Rydzek	407
10	(France) Sebastien Lacroix	403

Rank		Points
11	(Germany) Björn Kircheisen	384
12	(Czech Republic) Miroslav Dvořák	348
13	(Austria) Christoph Bieler	327
14	(Japan) Taihei Kato	323
15	(Japan) Yoshito Watabe	310
16	(United States) Taylor Fletcher	303
17	(Norway) Håvard Klemetsen	272
18	(Norway) Magnus Krog	264
19	(Slovenia) Marjan Jelenko	261
19	(Norway) Jørgen Graabak	259

Rank		Points
21	(United States) Bryan Fletcher	256
22	(France) Francois Braud	230
23	(Japan) Hideaki Nagai	220
24	(Austria) Mario Seidl	206
25	(Germany) Fabian Rießle	173
26	(Austria) Mario Stecher	171
27	(Norway) Jan Schmid	160
28	(France) Maxime Laheurte	137
29	(Germany) Janis Morweiser	133
30	(Austria) Tomaz Druml	126

- Standings after 17 events.

=== Nations Cup ===
Rank		Points
1	Germany	4105
2	Norway	3178
3	Austria	2932
4	France	2460
5	Japan	2236
6	United States	1287
7	Czech Republic	1043
8	Slovenia	578
9	Finland	226
10	Italy	208

- Standings after 22 events.

== Achievements ==
First World Cup podium

- Sebastien Lacroix (FRA), 29, in his 11th season – no. 3 in the WC 3 in Kuusamo
- Miroslav Dvořák (CZE), 25, in his 8th season – no. 3 in the WC 14 in Almaty

Victory in this World Cup (in brackets victory for all time)

- Eric Frenzel (GER), 4 (7) first places
- Magnus Moan (NOR), 3 (21) first places
- Jason Lamy-Chappuis (FRA), 2 (22) first places
- Björn Kircheisen (GER), 1 (16) first places
- Christoph Bieler (AUT), 1 (6) first places
- Mikko Kokslien (NOR), 1 (5) first places
- Bernhard Gruber (AUT), 1 (4) first places
- Tino Edelmann (GER), 1 (3) first places
