= Nordic combined at the 2014 Winter Olympics – Individual normal hill/10 km =

Men's individual normal hill/10 km at the XXII Olympic Winter Games
- Pictogram for Nordic combined
- Venue: RusSki Gorki Jumping Center
- Dates: 12 February 2014
- Competitors: 46 from 15 nations
- Winning time: 23:50.2

Medalists
1st place, gold medalist(s)		Eric Frenzel	Germany
2nd place, silver medalist(s)		Akito Watabe	Japan
3rd place, bronze medalist(s)		Magnus Krog	Norway

The men's individual normal hill/10 km Nordic combined competition for the 2014 Winter Olympics in Sochi, Russia, was held at RusSki Gorki Jumping Center on 12 February.

== Results ==
=== Ski jumping ===
The ski jumping was started at 13:30.

Rank	Bib	Name	Country	Distance (m)	Points	Time difference
1	46	Eric Frenzel	Germany	103.0	131.5	—
2	45	Akito Watabe	Japan	100.5	130.0	+0:06
3	1	Evgenii Klimov	Russia	99.0	124.7	+0:27
4	21	Taihei Kato	Japan	100.0	124.1	+0:30
5	37	Lukas Klapfer	Austria	99.0	124.0	+0:30
5	33	Tino Edelmann	Germany	98.0	124.0	+0:30
7	25	Marjan Jelenko	Slovenia	99.0	123.9	+0:30
8	43	Jason Lamy-Chappuis	France	98.5	123.7	+0:31
9	44	Håvard Klemetsen	Norway	99.0	122.7	+0:35
10	19	Yoshito Watabe	Japan	100.0	122.4	+0:36
11	35	Christoph Bieler	Austria	98.5	121.9	+0:38
12	42	Johannes Rydzek	Germany	98.0	121.2	+0:41
13	17	Tomáš Portýk	Czech Republic	97.5	119.8	+0:47
14	26	Hideaki Nagai	Japan	97.0	119.6	+0:48
15	40	Magnus Moan	Norway	99.5	119.4	+0:48
16	38	Wilhelm Denifl	Austria	97.0	117.6	+0:56
17	16	Maxime Laheurte	France	97.0	117.3	+0:57
17	2	Kristjan Ilves	Estonia	97.5	117.3	+0:57
19	30	Fabian Rießle	Germany	95.5	116.5	+1:00
20	39	Magnus Krog	Norway	97.0	115.8	+1:03
21	3	Lukas Runggaldier	Italy	97.0	115.7	+1:03
22	13	Pavel Churavý	Czech Republic	96.5	114.9	+1:07
23	29	Mario Stecher	Austria	95.5	114.6	+1:08
24	24	François Braud	France	95.0	113.5	+1:12
25	31	Alessandro Pittin	Italy	94.5	113.4	+1:12
26	11	Eetu Vähäsöyrinki	Finland	94.5	112.4	+1:16
27	6	Viktor Pasichnyk	Ukraine	95.0	112.1	+1:18
28	20	Sébastien Lacroix	France	94.5	112.0	+1:18
29	28	Ilkka Herola	Finland	94.0	111.9	+1:18
30	14	Mitja Oranič	Slovenia	93.5	109.2	+1:29
31	27	Bill Demong	United States	92.5	108.2	+1:33
31	5	Janne Ryynänen	Finland	93.5	108.2	+1:33
33	4	Tomáš Slavík	Czech Republic	94.0	108.1	+1:34
34	10	Todd Lodwick	United States	92.5	108.0	+1:34
35	41	Mikko Kokslien	Norway	93.0	107.3	+1:37
35	18	Armin Bauer	Italy	92.5	107.3	+1:37
37	9	Mikke Leinonen	Finland	92.0	106.7	+1:39
38	34	Tim Hug	Switzerland	91.5	106.5	+1:40
39	12	Gašper Berlot	Slovenia	92.5	106.3	+1:41
40	22	Samuel Costa	Italy	91.0	106.1	+1:42
41	36	Bryan Fletcher	United States	90.5	105.6	+1:44
42	8	Adam Cieślar	Poland	90.5	104.1	+1:50
43	15	Han Hendrik Piho	Estonia	90.5	102.8	+1:55
44	32	Miroslav Dvořák	Czech Republic	89.5	101.8	+1:59
45	7	Karl-August Tiirmaa	Estonia	89.5	99.9	+2:06
46	23	Taylor Fletcher	United States	85.5	92.9	+2:34

=== Cross-country ===
The Cross-country was started at 16:30.

Rank	Bib	Name	Country	Start time	Cross country time	Cross country rank	Finish time
1st place, gold medalist(s)	1	Eric Frenzel	Germany	0:00	23:50.2	12	—
2nd place, silver medalist(s)	2	Akito Watabe	Japan	0:06	23:48.4	10	+4.2
3rd place, bronze medalist(s)	20	Magnus Krog	Norway	1:03	22:55.3	2	+8.1
4	25	Alessandro Pittin	Italy	1:12	22:47.5	1	+9.3
5	15	Magnus Moan	Norway	0:48	23:14.9	4	+12.7
6	12	Johannes Rydzek	Germany	0:41	23:26.5	8	+17.3
7	21	Lukas Runggaldier	Italy	1:03	23:06.9	3	+19.7
8	19	Fabian Rießle	Germany	1:00	23:19.6	6	+29.4
9	6	Tino Edelmann	Germany	0:30	23:57.2	16	+37.0
10	9	Håvard Klemetsen	Norway	0:35	23:53.4	14	+38.2
11	11	Christoph Bieler	Austria	0:38	23:52.4	13	+40.2
12	5	Lukas Klapfer	Austria	0:30	24:24.5	26	+1:04.3
13	35	Mikko Kokslien	Norway	1:37	23:19.5	5	+1:06.3
14	36	Armin Bauer	Italy	1:37	23:19.7	7	+1:06.5
15	10	Yoshito Watabe	Japan	0:36	24:22.3	25	+1:08.1
16	29	Ilkka Herola	Finland	1:18	23:41.9	9	+1:09.7
17	17	Maxime Laheurte	France	0:57	24:05.4	20	+1:12.2
18	23	Mario Stecher	Austria	1:08	23:54.8	15	+1:12.6
19	16	Wilhelm Denifl	Austria	0:56	24:10.4	24	+1:16.2
20	24	François Braud	France	1:12	23:57.3	17	+1:19.1
21	7	Marjan Jelenko	Slovenia	0:30	24:53.2	32	+1:33.0
22	14	Hideaki Nagai	Japan	0:48	24:42.1	30	+1:39.9
23	22	Pavel Churavý	Czech Republic	1:06	24:26.1	27	+1:41.9
24	31	Bill Demong	United States	1:33	24:06.8	21	+1:49.6
25	33	Tomáš Slavík	Czech Republic	1:34	24:09.4	22	+1:53.2
26	41	Bryan Fletcher	United States	1:44	24:01.7	19	+1:55.5
27	38	Tim Hug	Switzerland	1:40	24:09.4	23	+1:59.2
28	28	Sébastien Lacroix	France	1:18	24:40.2	29	+2:08.0
29	44	Miroslav Dvořák	Czech Republic	1:59	23:59.6	18	+2:08.4
30	40	Samuel Costa	Italy	1:42	24:31.2	28	+2:23.0
31	4	Taihei Kato	Japan	0:30	25:45.0	39	+2:24.8
32	13	Tomáš Portýk	Czech Republic	0:47	25:30.2	36	+2:27.0
33	46	Taylor Fletcher	United States	2:34	23:48.9	11	+2:32.7
34	39	Gašper Berlot	Slovenia	1:41	24:44.9	31	+2:35.7
35	8	Jason Lamy-Chappuis	France	0:31	25:56.7	41	+2:37.5
36	32	Janne Ryynänen	Finland	1:33	25:01.0	33	+2:43.8
37	30	Mitja Oranič	Slovenia	1:29	25:17.4	34	+2:56.2
38	26	Eetu Vähäsöyrinki	Finland	1:16	25:32.7	38	+2:58.5
39	42	Adam Cieślar	Poland	1:50	25:18.7	35	+3:18.5
40	37	Mikke Leinonen	Finland	1:39	25:30.3	37	+3:19.1
41	18	Kristjan Ilves	Estonia	0:57	26:26.8	44	+3:33.6
42	27	Viktor Pasichnyk	Ukraine	1:18	26:13.5	42	+3:41.3
43	43	Han Hendrik Piho	Estonia	1:55	25:47.4	40	+3:52.2
44	45	Karl-August Tiirmaa	Estonia	2:06	26:23.2	43	+4:39.0
45	3	Evgenii Klimov	Russia	0:27	28:04.0	45	+4:40.8
	34	Todd Lodwick	United States	1:34	DNS		
