= Nordic combined at the 2018 Winter Olympics – Team large hill/4 × 5 km =

Men's team large hill/4 × 5 km at the XXIII Olympic Winter Games
- Venue: Alpensia Ski Jumping Centre (ski jumping); Alpensia Cross-Country Skiing Centre (cross-country skiing)
- Dates: 22 February 2018
- Competitors: 40 from 10 nations
- Winning time: 46:09.8

Medalists
1st place, gold medalist(s)		Vinzenz Geiger; Fabian Rießle; Eric Frenzel; Johannes Rydzek	Germany
2nd place, silver medalist(s)		Jan Schmid; Espen Andersen; Jarl Magnus Riiber; Jørgen Graabak	Norway
3rd place, bronze medalist(s)		Wilhelm Denifl; Lukas Klapfer; Bernhard Gruber; Mario Seidl	Austria

The men's team large hill/4 × 5 km Nordic combined competition for the 2018 Winter Olympics in Pyeongchang, South Korea, was held on 22 February 2018 at the Alpensia Ski Jumping Centre and Alpensia Cross-Country Skiing Centre on 22 February.

== Qualification ==
Using the Olympic Quota Allocation List and Continental Cup Standings, when no athletes remain in the allocation list (which includes results from 1 July 2016 to 21 January 2018), the top 50 athletes were awarded quotas (with maximum of five per country). Only a maximum of one team of four athletes could be entered into the event. The remaining five quotas were given to countries with three athletes to make a team. If a minimum of ten teams were already formed in the first 50, then the remaining five quotas would be allocated to the individual competition.

The qualified teams are:

- Austria
- Czech Republic
- Finland
- France
- Germany
- Italy
- Japan
- Norway
- Poland
- United States

== Results ==
=== Ski jumping ===
The ski jumping was held at 16:30.

Rank	Bib	Country	Distance (m)	Points	Time difference
1	7; 7–1; 7–2; 7–3; 7–4	Austria; Mario Seidl; Bernhard Gruber; Lukas Klapfer; Wilhelm Denifl	131.0; 136.0; 131.0; 138.5	469.5; 112.6; 117.9; 114.6; 124.4	–
2	9; 9–1; 9–2; 9–3; 9–4	Germany; Eric Frenzel; Vinzenz Geiger; Fabian Rießle; Johannes Rydzek	137.0; 129.5; 127.5; 138.0	464.7; 123.6; 102.6; 109.2; 129.3	+0:06
3	8; 8–1; 8–2; 8–3; 8–4	Japan; Hideaki Nagai; Go Yamamoto; Yoshito Watabe; Akito Watabe	127.0; 132.5; 128.0; 137.5	455.3; 106.8; 111.3; 110.9; 126.3	+0:19
4	10; 10–1; 10–2; 10–3; 10–4	Norway; Jørgen Graabak; Jarl Magnus Riiber; Espen Andersen; Jan Schmid	133.5; 133.5; 128.5; 132.0	449.2; 114.4; 117.9; 105.0; 111.9	+0:27
5	5; 5–1; 5–2; 5–3; 5–4	France; François Braud; Jason Lamy-Chappuis; Antoine Gérard; Maxime Laheurte	129.5; 127.5; 127.0; 133.0	417.9; 127.0; 92.2; 97.6; 116.4	+1:09
6	3; 3–1; 3–2; 3–3; 3–4	Czech Republic; Ondřej Pažout; Miroslav Dvořák; Lukáš Daněk; Tomáš Portyk	123.0; 120.5; 119.5; 131.0	382.2; 100.1; 88.0; 81.5; 112.6	+1:56
7	6; 6–1; 6–2; 6–3; 6–4	Finland; Ilkka Herola; Leevi Mutru; Hannu Manninen; Eero Hirvonen	133.0; 108.0; 116.0; 133.5	381.3; 116.6; 61.3; 82.4; 121.0	+1:58
8	1; 1–1; 1–2; 1–3; 1–4	Poland; Wojciech Marusarz; Paweł Słowiok; Adam Cieślar; Szczepan Kupczak	114.0; 107.0; 121.5; 130.0	337.2; 72.8; 67.9; 85.6; 110.9	+2:56
9	2; 2–1; 2–2; 2–3; 2–4	United States; Ben Loomis; Ben Berend; Taylor Fletcher; Bryan Fletcher	111.5; 120.0; 100.0; 129.5	324.8; 78.2; 87.5; 52.9; 106.2	+3:13
10	4; 4–1; 4–2; 4–3; 4–4	Italy; Aaron Kostner; Lukas Runggaldier; Alessandro Pittin; Raffaele Buzzi	106.5; 105.5; 112.5; 123.0	291.8; 69.4; 56.9; 77.0; 88.5	+3:57

=== Cross-country ===
The cross-country relay was held at 19:20.

Rank	Bib	Country	Start time	Cross-country time	Rank	Finish time	Deficit
1st place, gold medalist(s)	2; 2–1; 2–2; 2–3; 2–4	Germany; Vinzenz Geiger; Fabian Rießle; Eric Frenzel; Johannes Rydzek	0:06	46:03.8; 11:33.8; 11:24.1; 11:05.4; 12:00.5	1	46:09.8	—
2nd place, silver medalist(s)	4; 4–1; 4–2; 4–3; 4–4	Norway; Jan Schmid; Espen Andersen; Jarl Magnus Riiber; Jørgen Graabak	0:27	46:35.5; 11:24.9; 11:55.5; 11:28.2; 11:46.9	2	47:02.5	+52.7
3rd place, bronze medalist(s)	1; 1–1; 1–2; 1–3; 1–4	Austria; Wilhelm Denifl; Lukas Klapfer; Bernhard Gruber; Mario Seidl	0:00	47:17.6; 11:52.2; 11:53.8; 11:23.6; 12:08.0	5	47:17.6	+1:07.8
4	3; 3–1; 3–2; 3–3; 3–4	Japan; Yoshito Watabe; Hideaki Nagai; Go Yamamoto; Akito Watabe	0:19	47:59.6; 11:43.5; 11:49.7; 12:22.1; 12:04.3	7	48:18.6	+2:08.8
5	5; 5–1; 5–2; 5–3; 5–4	France; Antoine Gérard; François Braud; Maxime Laheurte; Jason Lamy-Chappuis	1:09	47:28.0; 11:39.8; 11:47.2; 12:00.8; 12:00.2	6	48:37.0	+2:27.2
6	7; 7–1; 7–2; 7–3; 7–4	Finland; Leevi Mutru; Ilkka Herola; Eero Hirvonen; Hannu Manninen	1:58	46:42.5; 11:41.0; 11:26.5; 11:26.7; 12:08.3	3	48:40.5	+2:30.7
7	6; 6–1; 6–2; 6–3; 6–4	Czech Republic; Tomáš Portyk; Ondřej Pažout; Lukáš Daněk; Miroslav Dvořák	1:56	48:11.1; 11:41.5; 12:09.3; 12:08.1; 12:12.2	8	50:07.1	+3:57.3
8	10; 10–1; 10–2; 10–3; 10–4	Italy; Lukas Runggaldier; Aaron Kostner; Raffaele Buzzi; Alessandro Pittin	3:57	47:17.1; 11:45.2; 12:06.3; 11:37.5; 11:48.1	4	51:14.1	+5:04.3
9	8; 8–1; 8–2; 8–3; 8–4	Poland; Paweł Słowiok; Wojciech Marusarz; Szczepan Kupczak; Adam Cieślar	2:56	48:28.8; 11:44.3; 12:20.8; 12:22.9; 12:00.8	10	51:24.8	+5:15.0
10	9; 9–1; 9–2; 9–3; 9–4	United States; Taylor Fletcher; Ben Berend; Ben Loomis; Bryan Fletcher	3:13	48:13.5; 11:38.7; 12:42.3; 11:51.3; 12:01.2	9	51:26.5	+5:16.7
