= Viktor Pasichnyk =

Ukrainian Nordic combined skier (born 1992)

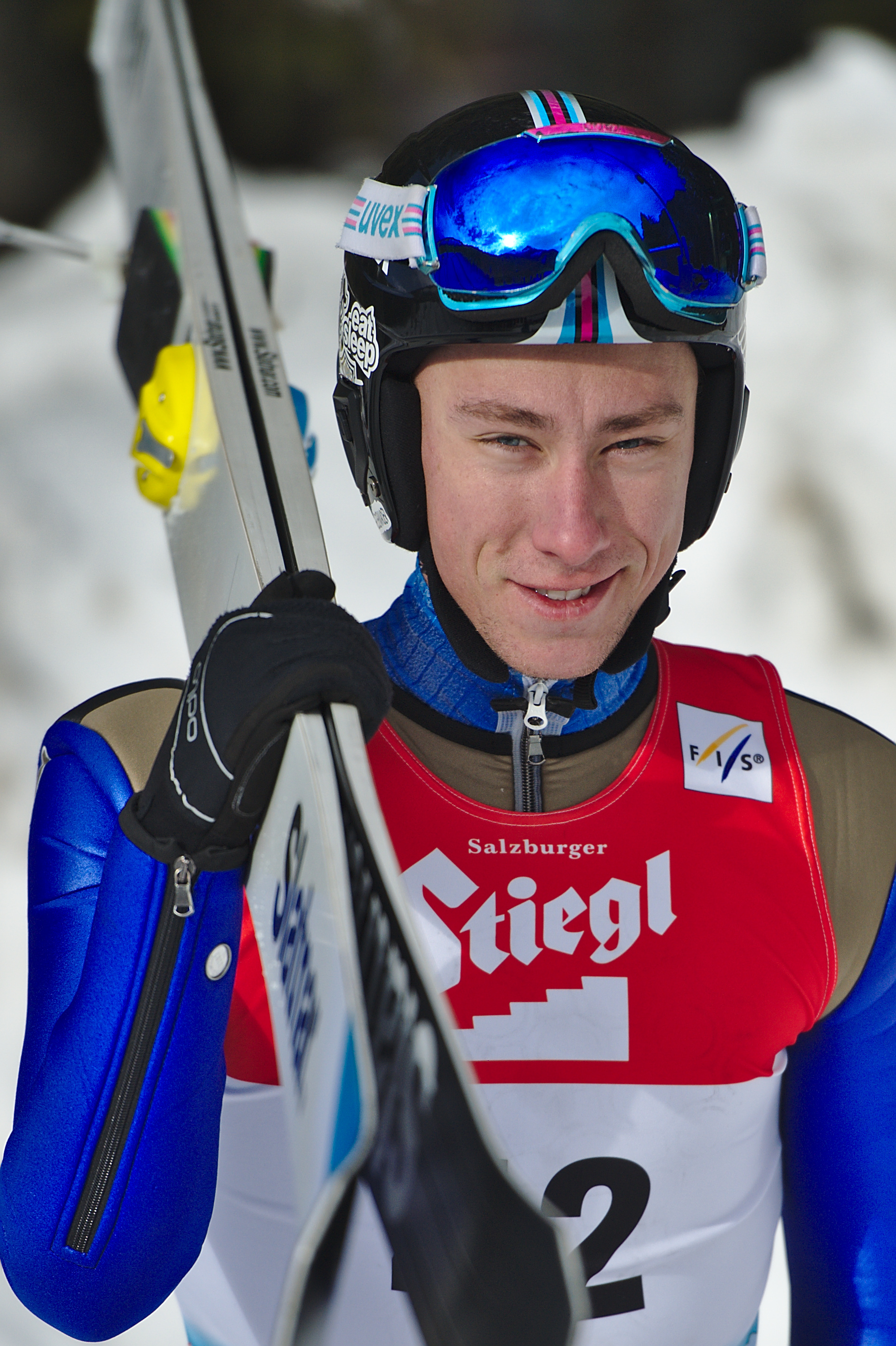

Personal information
- Full name: Viktor Pasichnyk
- Born: 2 December 1992 (age 33) Kremenets, Ukraine
- Height: 6 ft (183 cm)
- Weight: 158.7 lb (72 kg)

Sport
- Sport: Skiing
- Club: Kremenets Ski School

World Cup career
- Seasons: 2013–
- Indiv. wins: 0
- Updated on February 2, 2018

Viktor Viktorovich Pasichnyk (Ukrainian: Віктор Вікторович Пасічник) (born December 2, 1992, in Kremenets, Ukraine) is a Ukrainian Nordic combined skier. He participated at the 2014 and 2018 Winter Olympics.

== Career ==
He began to compete at World Cup in 2012-13 season. In his first race in Almaty, Kazakhstan on February 9, 2013, he was 36th. Next day he was 34th. That season was over for him without any World Cup point. In pre-Olympic season he had more World Cup starts. On January 5, 2014, Pasichnyk was 19th in Russian Chaikovskiy which is his best result so far.

Viktor participated at 2014 Winter Olympics in Sochi, Russia. He was 30th in LH competition and 42nd in NH competition.

After 2014 Olympics he didn't actively participate at World Cup having started just in several races. He had good results at Winter Universiades: in 2015 he was 4th in NH competition, and 5th in 2017 in team competition. In 2017-18 season he took part in 5 individual and one team races but didn't manage to earn any point.

Before the 2018 Winter Olympics Viktor set his personal best in the World Cup which was 16th in Val di Fiemme, Italy, on January 13, 2018, and later he repeated this achievement in Hakuba, Japan, on February 3, 2018. He gained Olympic quota for the 2018 Games. In Pyeongchang he finished 30th and 23rd.

== Career results ==
=== Winter Olympics ===
Year	Place	NH	LH
2014	Sochi, Russia	42	30
2018	Pyeongchang, South Korea	30	23

=== World Championships ===
Year	Place	NH	LH	TS
2013	Val di Fiemme, Italy	40	35	14
2015	Falun, Sweden	44	40	12
2017	Lahti, Finland	39	30	14
2019	Seefeld, Austria	44	42	13

=== World Cup ===
==== Rankings ====
Season	Overall
2013–14	60
2017–18	57
2018–19	68
