= Nordic combined at the 2014 Winter Olympics – Qualification =

A total of 55 quota spots are available to athletes to compete at the games. A maximum of 5 athletes can be entered by a National Olympic Committee. Competitors are eligible to compete if they have scored points at a World or Continental cup event during the qualification period of July 2012 to January 19, 2014. The top 50 on the Olympic quota allocation list respecting the maximum of 5 per country will qualify to compete, including the host. The host will be allowed to enter one competitor in each competition including the relay provided the athletes are on the allocation list. Following the top 50, quota spots will be given to nations competing in the relay competition who do not have the required four entrants yet to bring the number of relay teams up to ten. If at that point, the maximum has not been achieved the highest ranking athletes from the Continental Cup will be chosen.

== Quota allocation ==
Current allocation as of January 22, 2014 (includes the 2012–13 season and the 2013-14 season up to January 19).

=== Current summary ===
Nations	Athletes	Team
Austria	5	X
Czech Republic	4	X
Estonia	3	
Finland	4	X
France	5	X
Germany	5	X
Italy	5	X
Japan	5	X
Norway	5	X
Poland	1	
Russia	4	X
Switzerland	1	
Slovenia	3	
Ukraine	1	
United States	4	X
Total: 15 NOCs	55	10
