= Fabian Rießle =

German Nordic combined skier

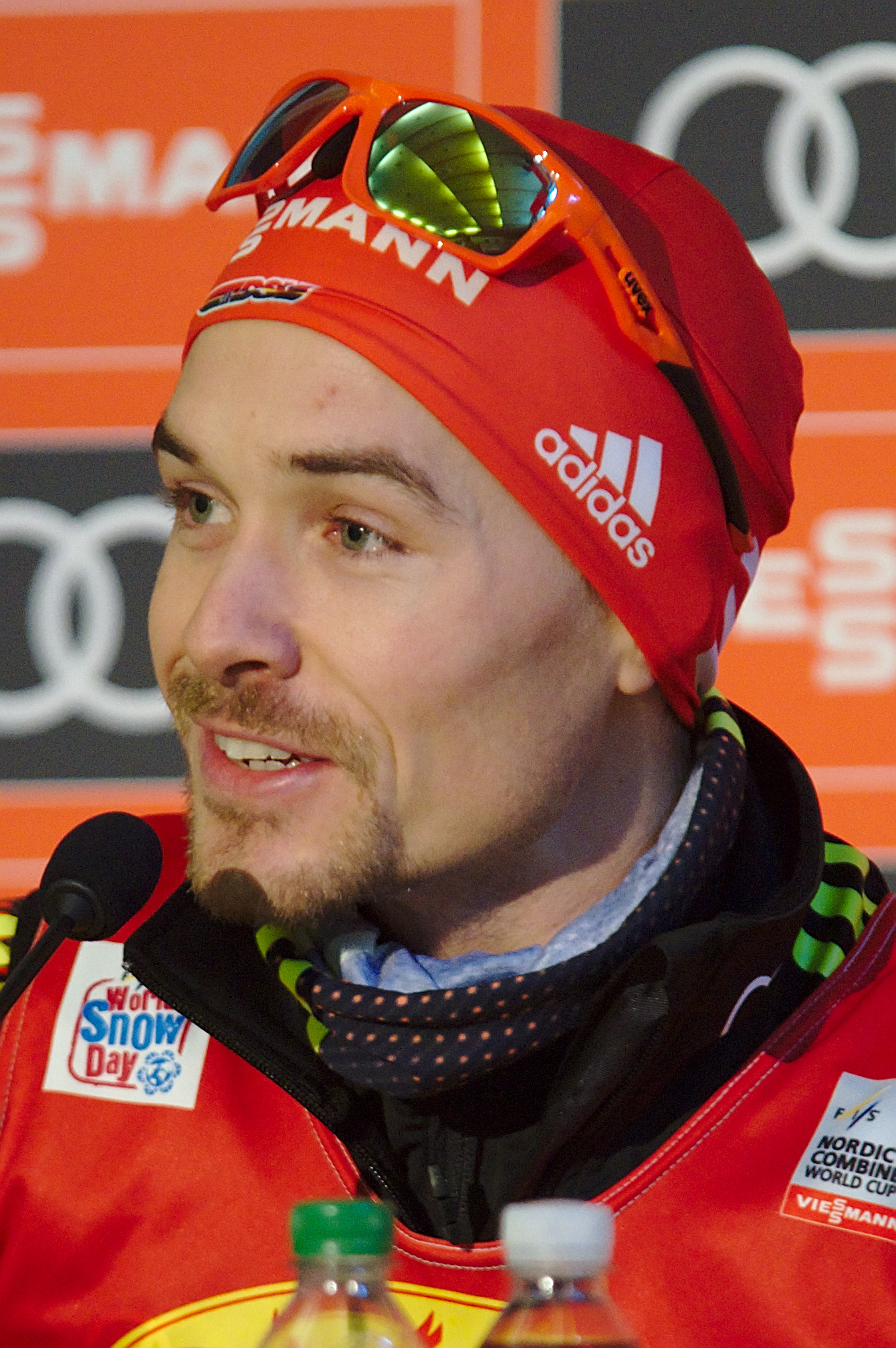

Personal information
- Nationality: Germany
- Born: 18 December 1990 (age 35) Freiburg im Breisgau, Germany
- Height: 1.72 m (5 ft 8 in)

Sport
- Sport: Skiing
- Club: SZ Breitnau

World Cup career
- Seasons: 2009–2024
- Indiv. starts: 209
- Indiv. podiums: 53
- Indiv. wins: 9
- Team podiums: 19
- Team wins: 7
Medal record
Olympic Games
Gold medal – first place	2018 Pyeongchang	Team LH
Silver medal – second place	2014 Sochi	Team LH
Silver medal – second place	2018 Pyeongchang	Individual LH
Bronze medal – third place	2014 Sochi	Individual LH
World Championships
Gold medal – first place	2015 Falun	Team NH
Gold medal – first place	2017 Lahti	Team NH
Gold medal – first place	2019 Seefeld	Team sprint
Silver medal – second place	2019 Seefeld	Team NH
Silver medal – second place	2021 Oberstdorf	Team NH
Bronze medal – third place	2021 Oberstdorf	Team sprint

Fabian Rießle (also spelled Riessle, born 18 December 1990) is a German former Nordic combined skier.

== Career ==
At the 2014 Winter Olympics in Sochi he won the bronze medal in the individual large hill/10 km competition. He became 9th in the ski jumping and started 56 seconds behind the leader, teammate Eric Frenzel. Rießle joined the leading group by mid-distance, and at the finish line became third. Six days earlier, in the individual normal hill/10 km event he finished 8th. On 20 March 2014, Rießle together with Björn Kircheisen, Johannes Rydzek, and Eric Frenzel won the silver medal in the team event.

At the 2018 Winter Olympics in Pyeongchang he won the silver medal in the individual large hill/10 km competition. On 22 February 2018, Rießle together with Vinzenz Geiger, Eric Frenzel, and Johannes Rydzek won the gold medal in the team event.

== Record ==
=== Olympic Games ===
Event	Normal hill	Large hill	Team relay
2014	8	Bronze	Silver
2018	7	Silver	Gold

=== World Championship ===
Year	Individual LH	Individual NH	Team NH	Team sprint
2013	—	24	6	—
2015	12	9	Gold	—
2017	6	4	Gold	—
2019	7	17	Silver	Gold
2021	5	6	Silver	Bronze

== World Cup ==
=== Standings ===
Season	Overall	NC-Triple
2009/10	60	—
2011/12	14	—
2012/13	25	—
2013/14	18	12
2014/15	4	6
2015/16	3rd place, bronze medalist(s)	3rd place, bronze medalist(s)
2016/17	4	6
2017/18	3rd place, bronze medalist(s)	3rd place, bronze medalist(s)
2018/19	8	2nd place, silver medalist(s)
2019/20	5	10
2020/21	4	7
2021/22	20	31
2022/23	23	10
2023/24	66	—

=== Individual victories ===
No.	Season	Date	Location
1	2015/16	5 December 2015	(Norway) Lillehammer
2	2015/16	24 January 2016	(France) Chaux-Neuve
3	2015/16	21 February 2016	(Finland) Lahti
4	2016/17	8 January 2017	(Finland) Lahti
5	2016/17	22 January 2017	(France) Chaux-Neuve
6	2017/18	17 December 2017	(Austria) Ramsau
7	2017/18	14 March 2018	(Norway) Trondheim
8	2017/18	17 March 2018	(Germany) Klingenthal
9	2017/18	18 March 2018	(Germany) Klingenthal
