= Samuel Costa =

Samuel Costa may refer to:

- Samuel Costa (skier) (born 1992), Italian skier
- Samuel Costa (footballer) (born 2000), Portuguese footballer
