= Jørgen Graabak =

Norwegian Nordic combined skier (born 1991)

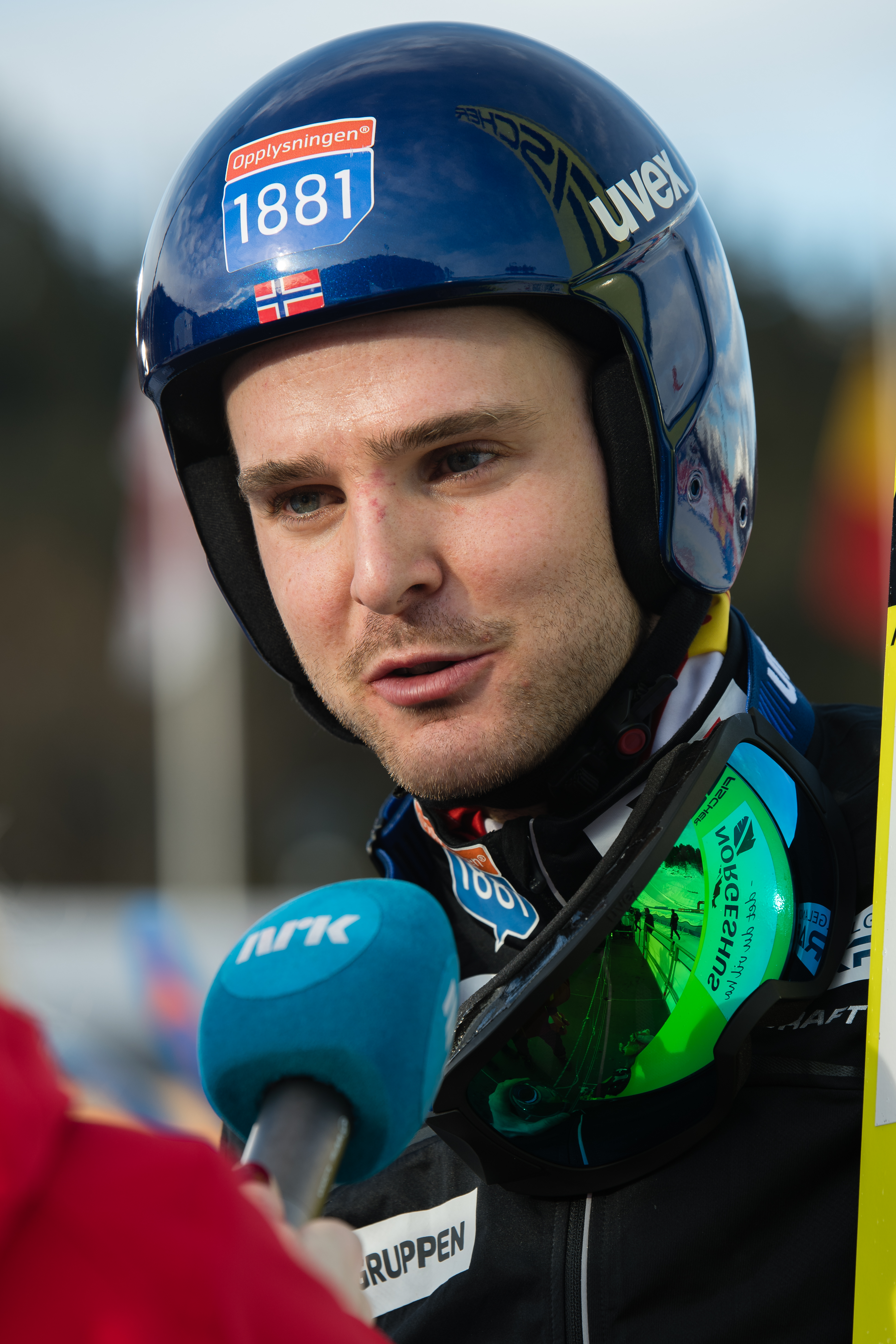
- Graabak in 2018

Personal information
- Full name: Jørgen Nyland Graabak
- Nationality: Norway
- Born: 26 April 1991 (age 35) Melhus Municipality, Norway
- Height: 1.85 m (6 ft 1 in)

Sport
- Sport: Skiing
- Club: Byåsen IL

World Cup career
- Seasons: 2011–2025
- Indiv. starts: 228
- Indiv. podiums: 46
- Indiv. wins: 7
- Discipline titles: 0 – (2nd in 2020)
Medal record
Men's Nordic combined
Representing Norway
Olympic Games
Gold medal – first place	2014 Sochi	Individual LH
Gold medal – first place	2014 Sochi	Team LH
Gold medal – first place	2022 Beijing	Individual LH
Gold medal – first place	2022 Beijing	Team LH
Silver medal – second place	2018 Pyeongchang	Team LH
Silver medal – second place	2022 Beijing	Individual NH
World Championships
Gold medal – first place	2019 Seefeld	Team NH
Gold medal – first place	2021 Oberstdorf	Team NH
Gold medal – first place	2023 Planica	Team LH
Silver medal – second place	2013 Val di Fiemme	Team NH
Silver medal – second place	2015 Falun	Team NH
Silver medal – second place	2017 Lahti	Team NH
Silver medal – second place	2025 Trondheim	Individual LH
Bronze medal – third place	2025 Trondheim	Team LH
- Updated on 23 May 2025

Jørgen Nyland Graabak (born 26 April 1991) is a Norwegian former Nordic combined skier. With four victories, he has won more Olympic gold medals in the sport than any other athlete.

== Biography ==
He hails from Trondheim Municipality and represents the club Byåsen IL.

== Career ==
Graabak has seven world cup victories. He competed for Norway at the 2014 Winter Olympics. After not participating in the Normal Hill race, he replaced Mikko Kokslien in the large hill event and won gold, having placed 6th after the jumping stage. In the Men's Nordic combined relay, he won a second gold, racing Norway's final leg.

He was awarded the Holmenkollen Medal in 2022.

== Record ==
=== Olympic Games ===
- 6 medals (4 gold, 2 silver)

Year	Individual NH	Individual LH	Team LH
2014	—	Gold	Gold
2018	18	10	Silver
2022	Silver	Gold	Gold

=== World Championships ===
- 8 medals (3 gold, 4 silver, 1 bronze)

Year	Individual NH	Individual LH	Team NH	Team sprint LH
2013	38	—	Silver	—
2015	8	24	Silver	—
2017	11	22	Silver	—
2019	9	DNS2	Gold	—
2021	9	14	Gold	—
2023	8	8	Gold	—N/a
2025	6	Silver	Bronze	—N/a
