= Kristjan Ilves =

Estonian Nordic combined skier (born 1996)

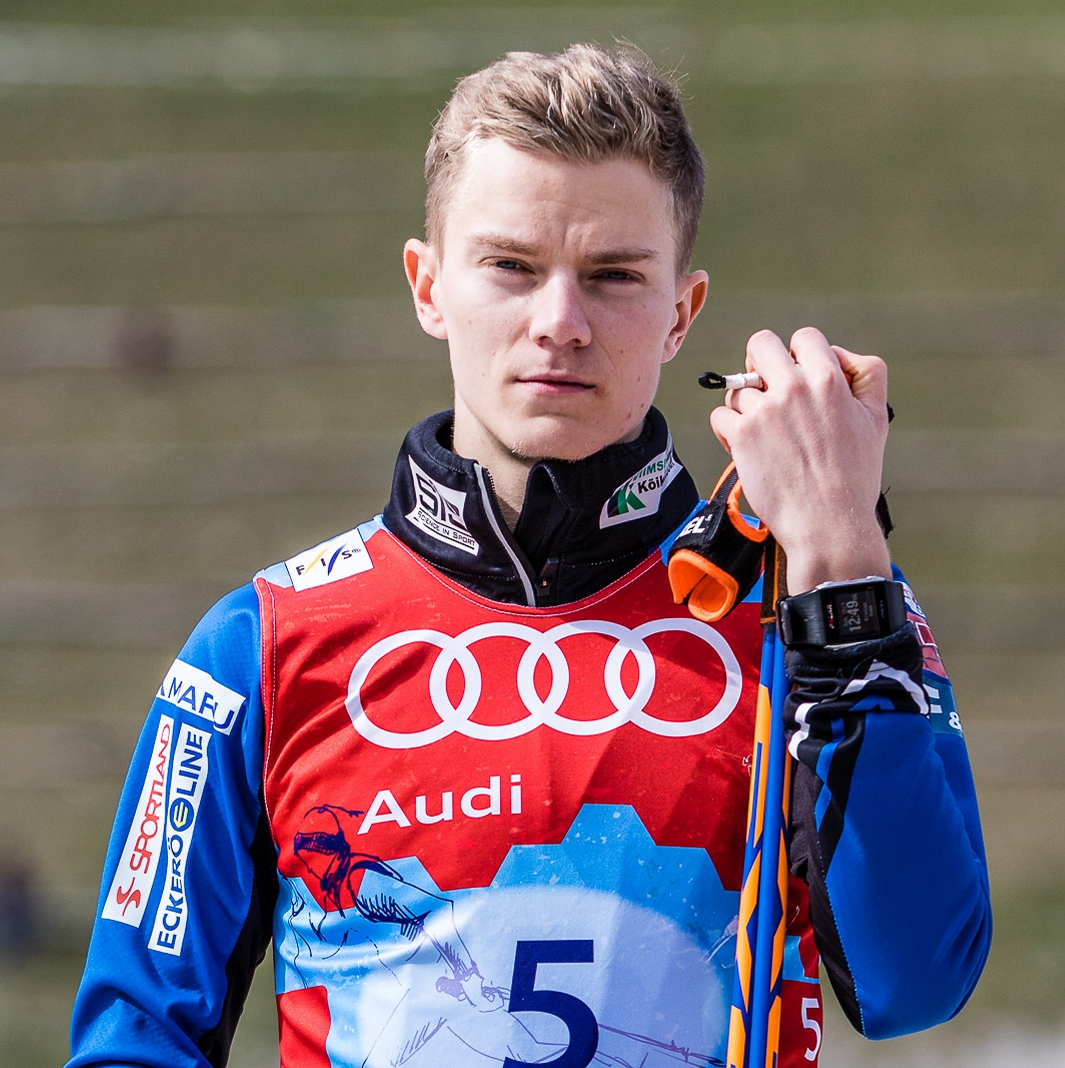

Personal information
- Born: 10 June 1996 (age 30) Tartu, Estonia

Sport
- Sport: Skiing
- Club: Elva Skiclub

World Cup career
- Seasons: 2013–
- Indiv. podiums: 12
Medal record
Men's Nordic combined
Representing Estonia
World Junior Championships
Bronze medal – third place	2013 Liberec	Individual NH
Bronze medal – third place	2015 Almaty	Individual NH
Bronze medal – third place	2016 Râșnov	Individual NH
- Updated on 3 March 2025

Kristjan Ilves (born 10 June 1996 in Tartu) is an Estonian Nordic combined skier.

Ilves competed at the 2014 Winter Olympics for Estonia. He placed 41st in the normal hill Nordic combined event and 34th in the large hill event.

As of March 2021, his best showing at the World Championships was 8th in the 2021 team sprint. His best individual finish was 11th in the large hill event during the same championships.

Ilves made his World Cup debut in February 2013. His best overall finish in the World Cup is 5th in the 2021–22 season.

He represented Estonia at the 2018 Winter Olympics and finished 16th in the Individual normal hill event. He competed in the 2022 Winter Olympics, placing 9th in the large hill event.

His best Olympic result came at the 2026 Games, where he finished 6th in the normal hill competition.

== Record ==
=== Olympic Games ===
Year	Age	Individual NH	Individual LH	Team LH
2014	17	41	34	—
2018	21	16	28	—
2022	25	—	9	—
2026	29	6	7	.

=== World Championship ===
Year	Age	Individual NH	Individual LH	Team NH	Team LH
2013	16	48	39	11	—
2015	18	40	38	10	11
2017	20	23	27	9	12
2019	22	43	DNS2	—	—
2021	24	19	11	—	8
2023	26	6	4	—N/a	—
2025	28	20	11	—N/a	—

== World Cup results ==
=== Season standings ===
Season	Age	Points	Overall
2013–14	17	1	80
2014–15	18	2	66
2015–16	19	7	54
2016–17	20	81	42
2017–18	21	264	19
2018–19	22	22	54
2019–20	23	56	31
2020–21	24	187	17
2021–22	25	627	5
2022–23	26	753	5
2023–24	27	1207	5
2024–25	28	743	10

=== Podiums ===
No.	Season	Date	Location	Hill	Discipline	Place
1	2017–18	4 February 2018	Hakuba, Japan	Olympic Hills	HS134/10 km	2nd
2	2021–22	15 January 2022	Klingenthal, Germany	Vogtland Arena	HS140/10 km	2nd
3	2021–22	16 January 2022	Klingenthal, Germany	Vogtland Arena	HS140/10 km	2nd
4	2022–23	11 February 2023	Schonach, Germany	Langenwaldschanze	HS100/10 km	3rd
5	2022–23	25 March 2023	Lahti, Finland	Salpausselkä	HS130/10 km	2nd
6	2022–23	26 March 2023	Lahti, Finland	Salpausselkä	HS130/10 km	3rd
7	2023–24	9 February 2024	Otepää, Estonia	Tehvandi	10 km/HS97	2nd
8	2023–24	10 February 2024	Otepää, Estonia	Tehvandi	HS97/10 km	2nd
9	2023–24	3 March 2024	Lahti, Finland	Salpausselkä	HS130/10 km	3rd
10	2023–24	10 March 2024	Oslo, Norway	Holmenkollbakken	HS134/10 km	3rd
11	2023–24	17 March 2024	Trondheim, Norway	Granåsen	HS138/10 km	3rd
12	2024–25	20 December 2024	Ramsau, Austria	W90-Mattensprunganlage	10 km/HS98	3rd
