= Bernhard Gruber =

Austrian Nordic combined skier

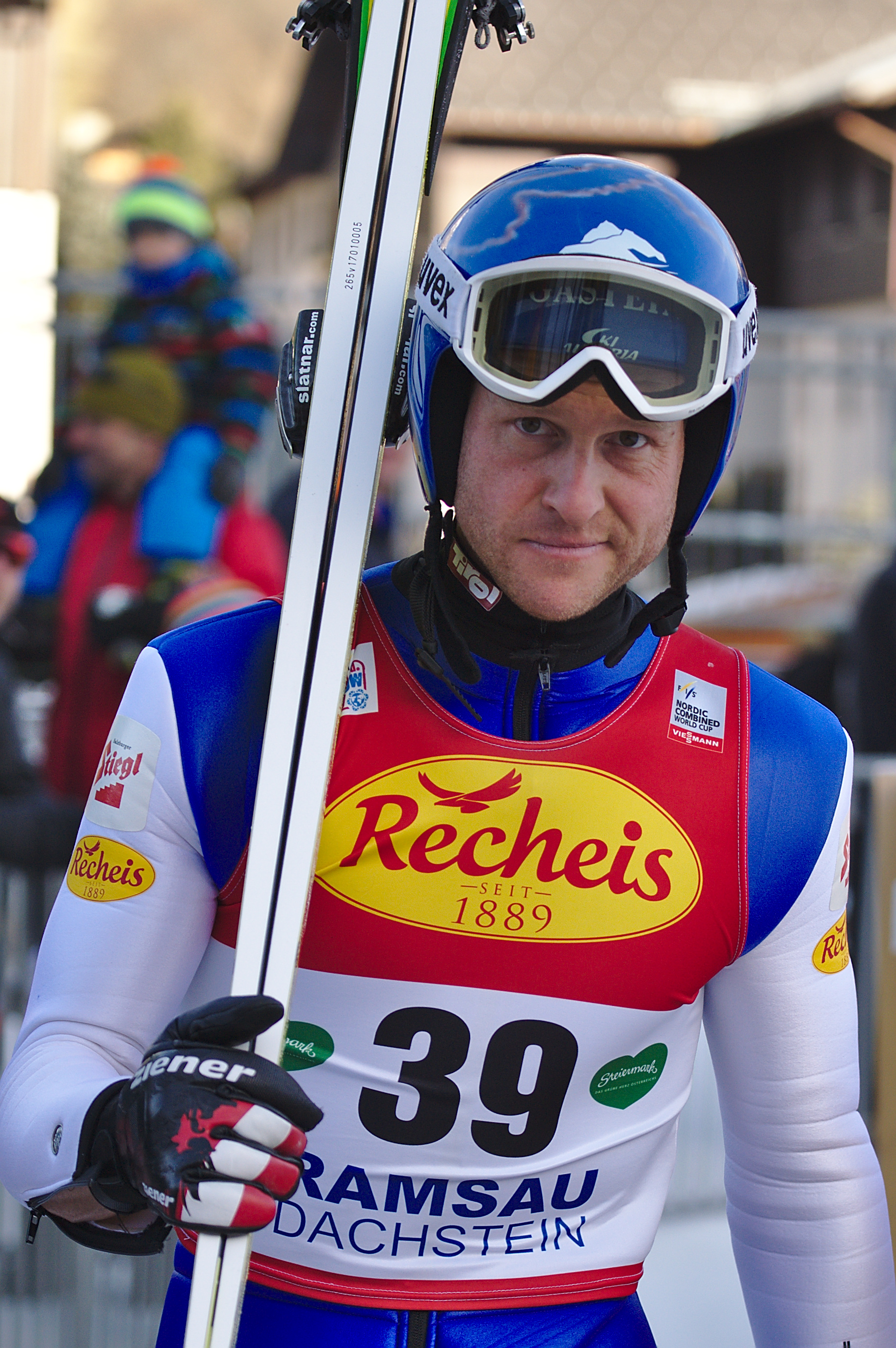

Personal information
- Nationality: Austria
- Born: 12 August 1982 (age 43) Schwarzach im Pongau, Austria
- Height: 1.85 m (6 ft 1 in)

Sport
- Sport: Skiing
- Club: SC Bischofshofen-Salzburg

World Cup career
- Seasons: 2003–2021
- Indiv. starts: 243
- Indiv. podiums: 27
- Indiv. wins: 7
Medal record
Olympic Games
Gold medal – first place	2010 Vancouver	Team LH
Bronze medal – third place	2010 Vancouver	Individual LH
Bronze medal – third place	2014 Sochi	Team LH
Bronze medal – third place	2018 Pyeongchang	Team LH
World Championships
Gold medal – first place	2011 Oslo	Team NH
Gold medal – first place	2011 Oslo	Team LH
Gold medal – first place	2015 Falun	Individual LH
Silver medal – second place	2013 Val di Fiemme	Individual LH
Silver medal – second place	2013 Val di Flemme	Team sprint
Silver medal – second place	2019 Seefeld	Individual NH
Bronze medal – third place	2017 Lahti	Team NH
Bronze medal – third place	2019 Seefeld	Team sprint
Disqualified	2019 Seefeld	Team NH

Bernhard Gruber (born 12 August 1982) is an Austrian former Nordic combined skier who competed between 2003 and 2021.

== Career ==
At the 2010 Winter Olympics, he won a gold in the 4 x 5 km team and a bronze in the 10 km individual large hill events.

At the FIS Nordic World Ski Championships 2009 in Liberec, Gruber finished fifth in the 4 x 5 km team, 11th in both the 10 km individual large hill and individual normal hill events, and 22nd in the 10 km mass start event.

He had seven World Cup victories in his career. His first wins came in 2008. One of these wins that year was in the 15 km individual event at the Holmenkollen ski festival in Oslo.

He retired in 2021 after his second heart surgery.

== Record ==
=== Olympic Games ===
- 4 medals – (1 gold, 3 bronze)

Year	Individual NH	Individual LH	Team LH
2010	—	Bronze	Gold
2014	—	5	Bronze
2018	20	21	Bronze

=== World Championship ===
- 8 medals – (3 gold, 3 silver, 2 bronze)

Year	Individual NH	Individual LH	Team NH	Team LH	Mass start NH	Team sprint LH
2009	11	11	—N/a	5	22	—N/a
2011	—	—	Gold	Gold	—N/a	—N/a
2013	13	Silver	5	—N/a	—N/a	Silver
2015	10	Gold	5	—N/a	—N/a	7
2017	7	9	Bronze	—N/a	—N/a	4
2019	Silver	10	DSQ	—N/a	—N/a	Bronze
