= Sepp Schneider =

Austrian Nordic combined skier (born 1991)

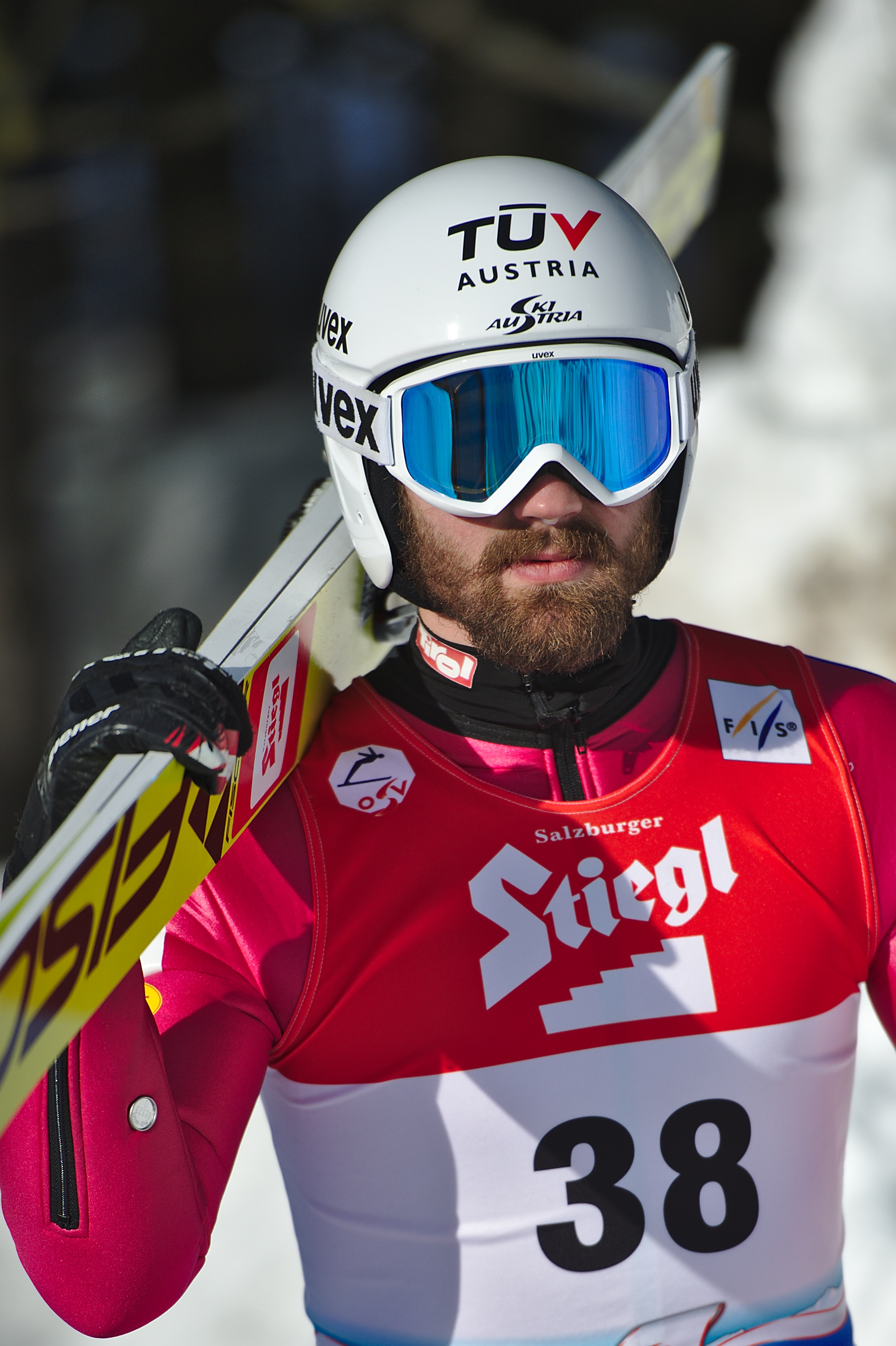

Personal information
- Full name: Sepp Schneider
- Born: 3 June 1991 (age 35)

Sport
- Sport: Skiing
- Club: SC Egg-Vorarlberg

World Cup career
- Seasons: -
Medal record
Men's Nordic combined skiing
Representing Austria

Sepp Schneider (born 3 June 1991) is an Austrian Nordic combined skier. He competed in the World Cup 2015 season.

He represented Austria at the FIS Nordic World Ski Championships 2015 in Falun.
