= Ruslan Balanda =

Ukrainian Nordic combined skier (born 1992)

Personal information
- Full name: Ruslan Balanda
- Born: 26 December 1992 (age 33) Kremenets

Sport
- Sport: Skiing
- Club: Kremenets Ski School

World Cup career
- Seasons: -
Medal record
Men's Nordic combined skiing
Representing Ukraine

Ruslan Balanda (Ukrainian: Руслан Баланда; born 26 December 1992) is a Ukrainian Nordic combined skier. He was born in Kremenets.

He represented Ukraine at the FIS Nordic World Ski Championships 2015 in Falun.
