= Lukáš Rypl =

Czech Nordic combined skier (born 1991)

Personal information
- Full name: Lukáš Rypl
- Born: 11 December 1991 (age 34) Kraslice

Sport
- Sport: Skiing
- Club: Dukla Liberec

World Cup career
- Seasons: -
Medal record
Men's Nordic combined skiing
Representing Czech Republic

Lukáš Rypl (born 11 December 1991) is a Czech Nordic combined skier. He was born in Kraslice. He competed in the World Cup 2015 season.

He represented the Czech Republic at the FIS Nordic World Ski Championships 2015 in Falun.
