= Petr Kutal =

Czech Nordic combined skier

Personal information
- Born: 31 August 1988 (age 37) Nové Město na Moravě

Sport
- Sport: Skiing
- Club: Dukla Liberec

World Cup career
- Seasons: 2010–2016
Medal record
Men's Nordic combined skiing
Representing Czech Republic

Petr Kutal (born 31 August 1988) is a retired Czech Nordic combined skier. He was born in Nové Město na Moravě.

Highlights of his career include a bronze medal at the Universiade in Harbin in 2009 and a third rank with the team at the Junior World Championships in Rovaniemi in 2005.

He represented the Czech Republic at the FIS Nordic World Ski Championships 2015 in Falun.
