= Jim Härtull =

Finnish Nordic combined skier

Jim Härtull (born March 11, 1990) is a Finnish Nordic combined skier who has been competing since 2007. At the FIS Nordic World Ski Championships 2009 in Liberec, he finished eighth in the 4 x 5 km team and 51st in the 10 km individual normal hill events.

Härtull's best World Cup finish was a 43rd in the 10 km Gundersen event at Klingenthal in February 2009. His best career finish was 12th in a Gundersen Continental Cup event also held at Klingenthal a month earlier.
