= François Braud =

Former French Nordic combined skier (born 1986)

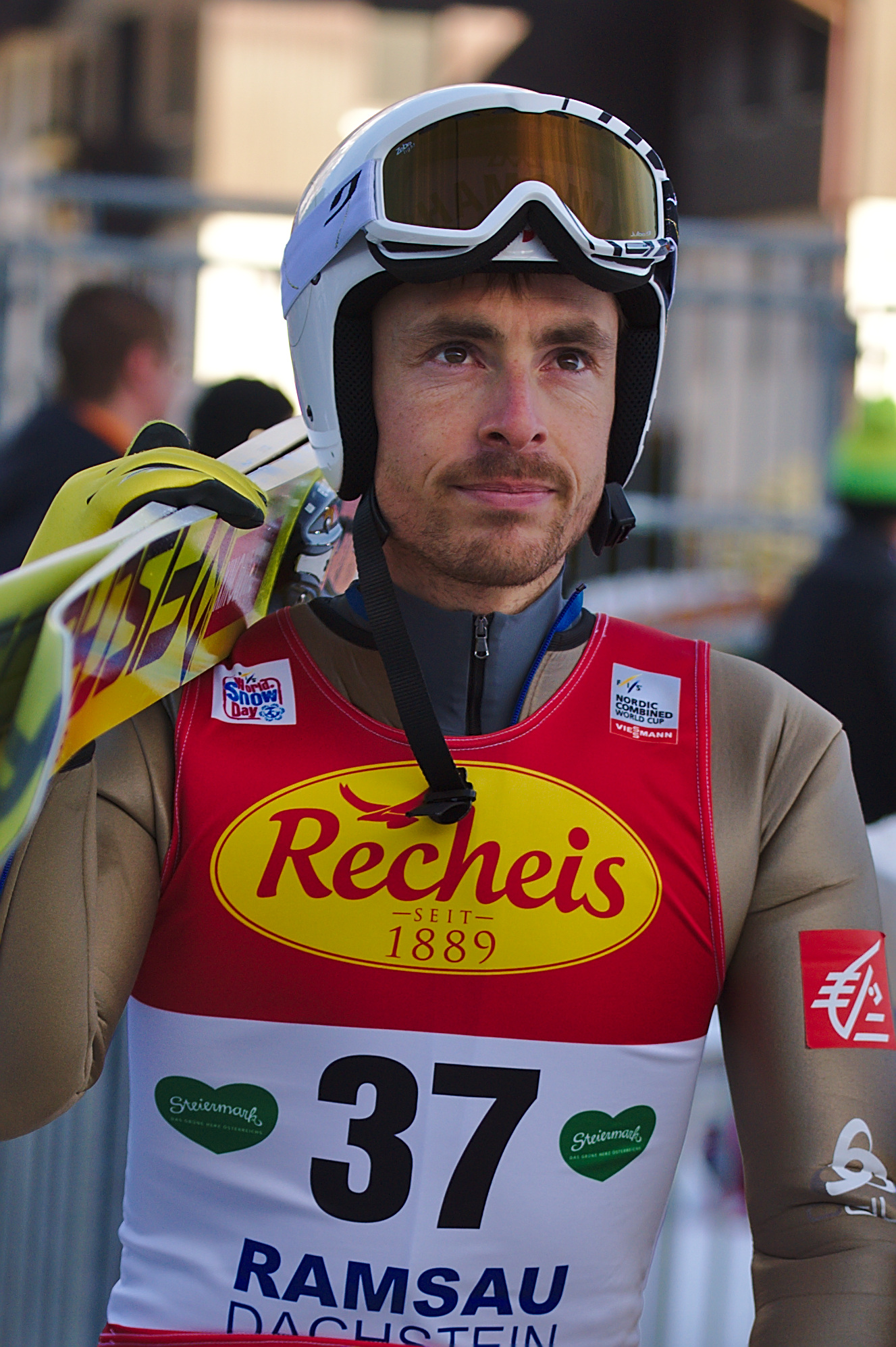

Personal information
- Nationality: France
- Born: 27 July 1986 (age 40) Pontarlier
- Height: 1.77 m (5 ft 10 in)
- Spouse: Elena Runggaldier (m. 2020)

Sport
- Sport: Skiing
- Club: C.S. Chamonix / Armée de terre

World Cup career
- Seasons: 2002–2019
- Indiv. starts: 234
- Indiv. podiums: 2
Medal record
World Championships
Gold medal – first place	2013 Val di Flemme	Team normal hill
Gold medal – first place	2015 Falun	Team sprint
Silver medal – second place	2015 Falun	10 km individual large hill
Bronze medal – third place	2015 Falun	4 x 5 km team
Bronze medal – third place	2017 Lahti	10 km individual large hill

François Braud (born 27 July 1986 in Pontarlier, Doubs) is a retired French Nordic combined skier and non-commissioned officer.

== Career ==
Competing in two Winter Olympics, he earned his best finish of fourth in the 4 x 5 km team event at Vancouver in 2010 while earning his best finish of 14th in the 10 km individual large hill event at those same games.

Braud's best finish at the FIS Nordic World Ski Championships was fourth in the 4 x 5 km team event at Liberec in 2009 while his best individual finish was tenth in the 10 km mass start at those same championships.

He has two individual career victories at various levels in the 15 km individual (2004, 2006). Braud's best World cup finish was fifth twice in a team 4 x 5 km event (2007, 2009) while his best individual finish was sixth three times, all in 2009.

== Personal life ==
In 2020, the International Ski and Snowboard Federation news outlet reported that Braud has registered his marriage to former ski jumping athlete, Elena Runggaldier.
