= Lukas Klapfer =

Austrian Nordic combined skier

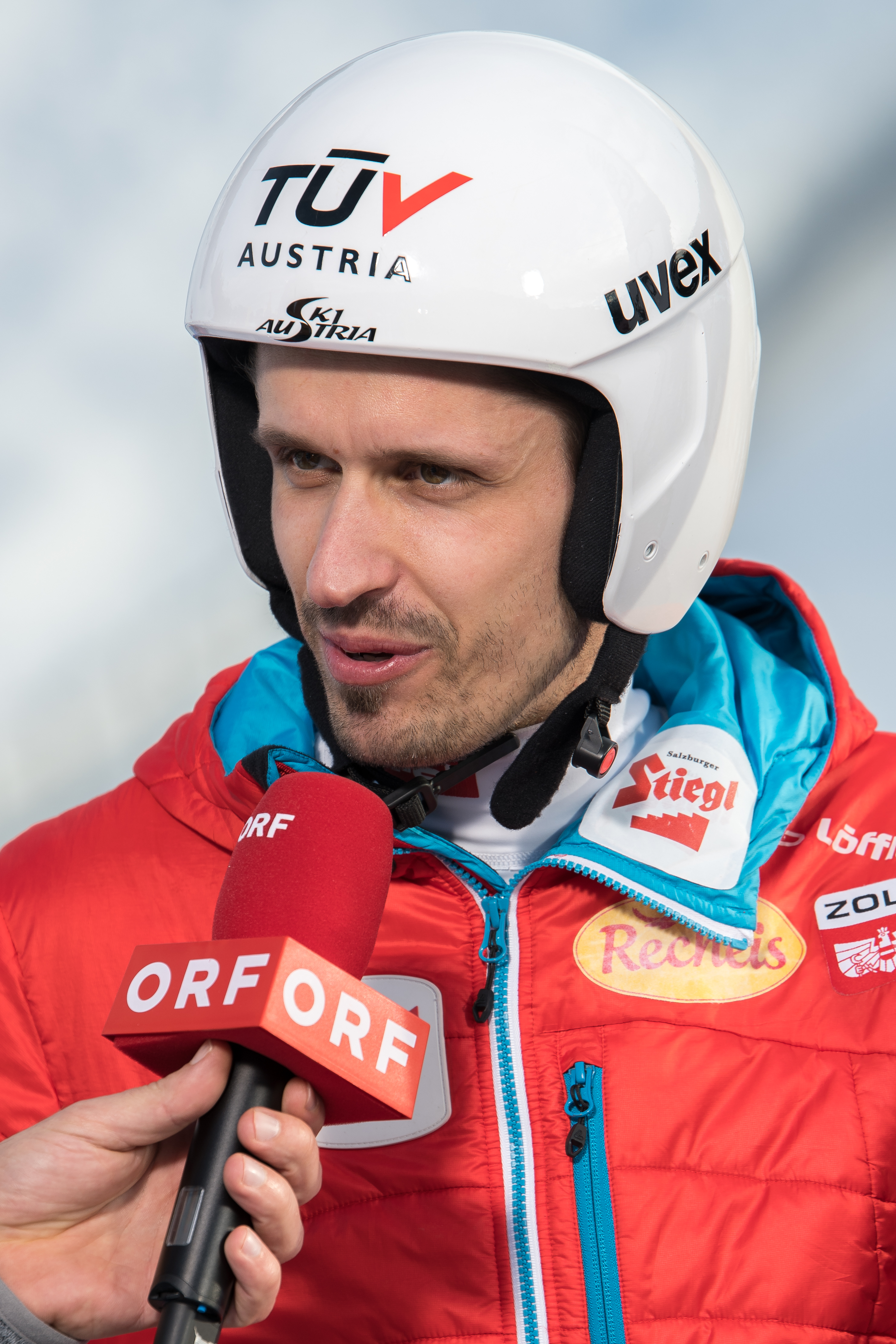

Personal information
- Nationality: Austria
- Born: 25 December 1985 (age 40) Eisenerz, Austria
- Height: 1.82 m (6 ft 0 in)

Sport
- Sport: Skiing
- Club: WSV Eisenerz-Steiermark

World Cup career
- Seasons: 2005–2022
- Indiv. podiums: 4
- Indiv. wins: 1
Medal record
Men's Nordic combined
Representing Austria
Olympic Games
Bronze medal – third place	2014 Sochi	Team LH
Bronze medal – third place	2018 Pyeongchang	Individual NH
Bronze medal – third place	2018 Pyeongchang	Team LH
World Championships
Bronze medal – third place	2021 Oberstdorf	Team NH
Disqualified	2019 Seefeld	Team NH
- Updated on 28 February 2021

Lukas Klapfer (born 25 December 1985) is an Austrian Nordic combined skier who has been competing since 2002. His best World Cup finish was second in the normal hill Gundersen event in Austria in February 2009.

At the FIS Nordic World Ski Championships 2009 in Liberec, Klapfer was scheduled to compete in the 10 km normal hill mass start event, but did not start.

== World Cup wins ==
Season	Date	Location	Hill
2014–15	4 January 2015	(Germany) Schonach	HS106
