= Alessandro Pittin =

Italian Nordic combined skier

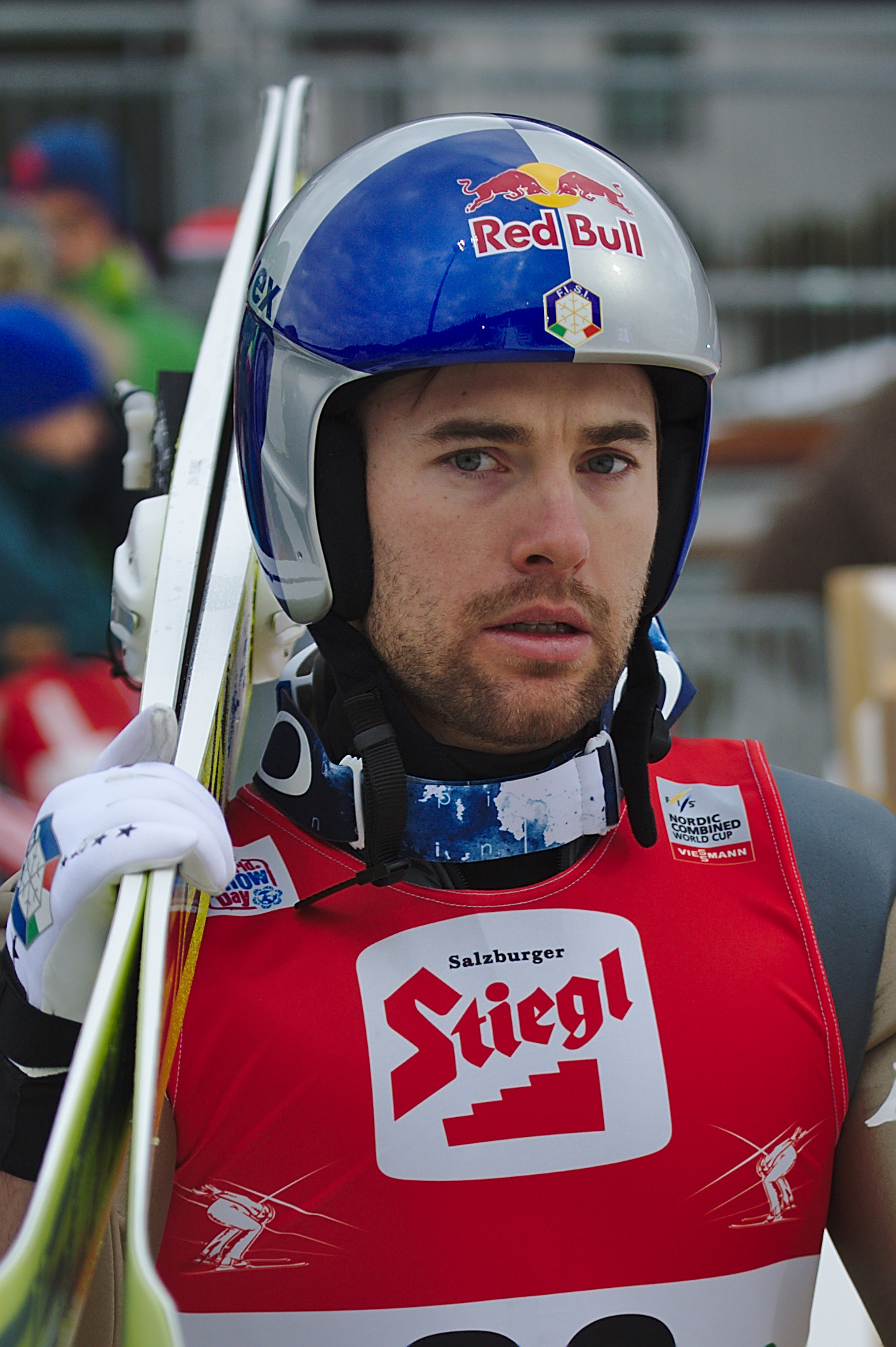
- Pittin in 2016

Personal information
- Born: 11 February 1990 (age 36) Tolmezzo, Italy

Sport
- Sport: Skiing
- Club: Fiamme Gialle

World Cup career
- Seasons: 2007–2026
- Indiv. starts: 207
- Indiv. podiums: 12
- Indiv. wins: 3
Medal record
Men's Nordic combined
Representing Italy
Olympic Games
Bronze medal – third place	2010 Vancouver	10 km individual NH
World Championships
Silver medal – second place	2015 Falun	10 km individual NH
World Junior Championships
Gold medal – first place	2008 Zakopane	10 km Individual NH
Bronze medal – third place	2008 Zakopane	5 km Individual NH
Gold medal – first place	2009 Štrbské Pleso	5 km Individual NH
Gold medal – first place	2009 Štrbské Pleso	10 km Individual NH

Alessandro Pittin (born 11 February 1990 in Tolmezzo) is a former Italian Nordic combined athlete. He has competed in six Olympic Games.

== Career ==
Pittin resides in Cercivento, Udine, Italy. He is a four-time Junior World Championships medallist, winning three gold and one bronze. He has won 3 World Cup races and placed on 16 podiums.

Pittin was the first Italian to medal in Nordic combined at the Winter Olympics with his bronze in the 10 km individual normal hill event at the 2010 Winter Olympics in Vancouver. Four years later at the 2014 Winter Olympics in Sochi, he placed fourth in the normal hill event. At the 2015 World Championships in Falun, Pittin was the silver medallist in the same discipline. He also participated in the three following Winter Olympics held in Pyongyang, Beijing and Milano Cortina.

== Nordic combined results ==
- All results are sourced from FIS.

=== Olympic games ===
- 1 medal (1 bronze)

Year	Individual NH	Individual LH	Team LH
2006	46	—	—
2010	Bronze	7	10
2014	4	18	8
2018	19	27	8
2022	32	33	9
2026	19	24	—
