= Leevi Mutru =

Finnish Nordic combined skier (born 1995)

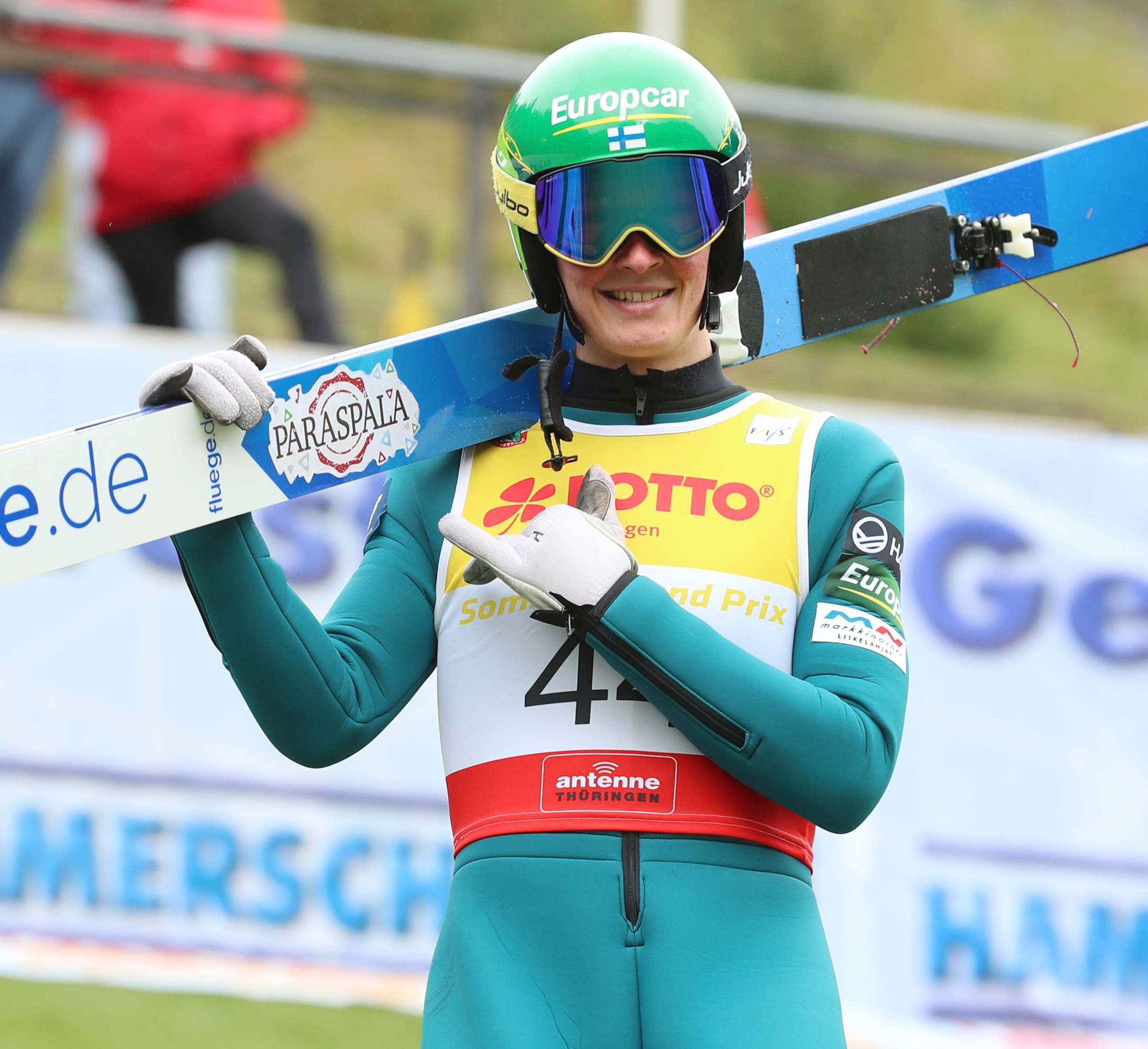

Personal information
- Full name: Leevi Mutru
- Born: 16 May 1995 (age 31)

Sport
- Sport: Skiing
- Club: Lahti SC

World Cup career
- Seasons: 2014-2024
- Indiv. starts: 80
- Indiv. podiums: 1 (Team event)

Leevi Mutru (born 16 May 1995) is a Finnish former Nordic combined skier. He competed in the World Cup for ten seasons. His best result is a 9th place in February 2019, in Lahti and a 3rd place in a team event 4x5km, in Chaux-Neuve, in January 2018, alongside Arttu Maekiaho, Ilkka Herola and Eero Hirvonen.

He represented Finland at the 2018 Winter Olympics and the FIS Nordic World Ski Championships in 2015, 2017 and 2019.

He retired in March 2024.
