= Marjan Jelenko =

Slovenian Nordic combined skier (born 1991)

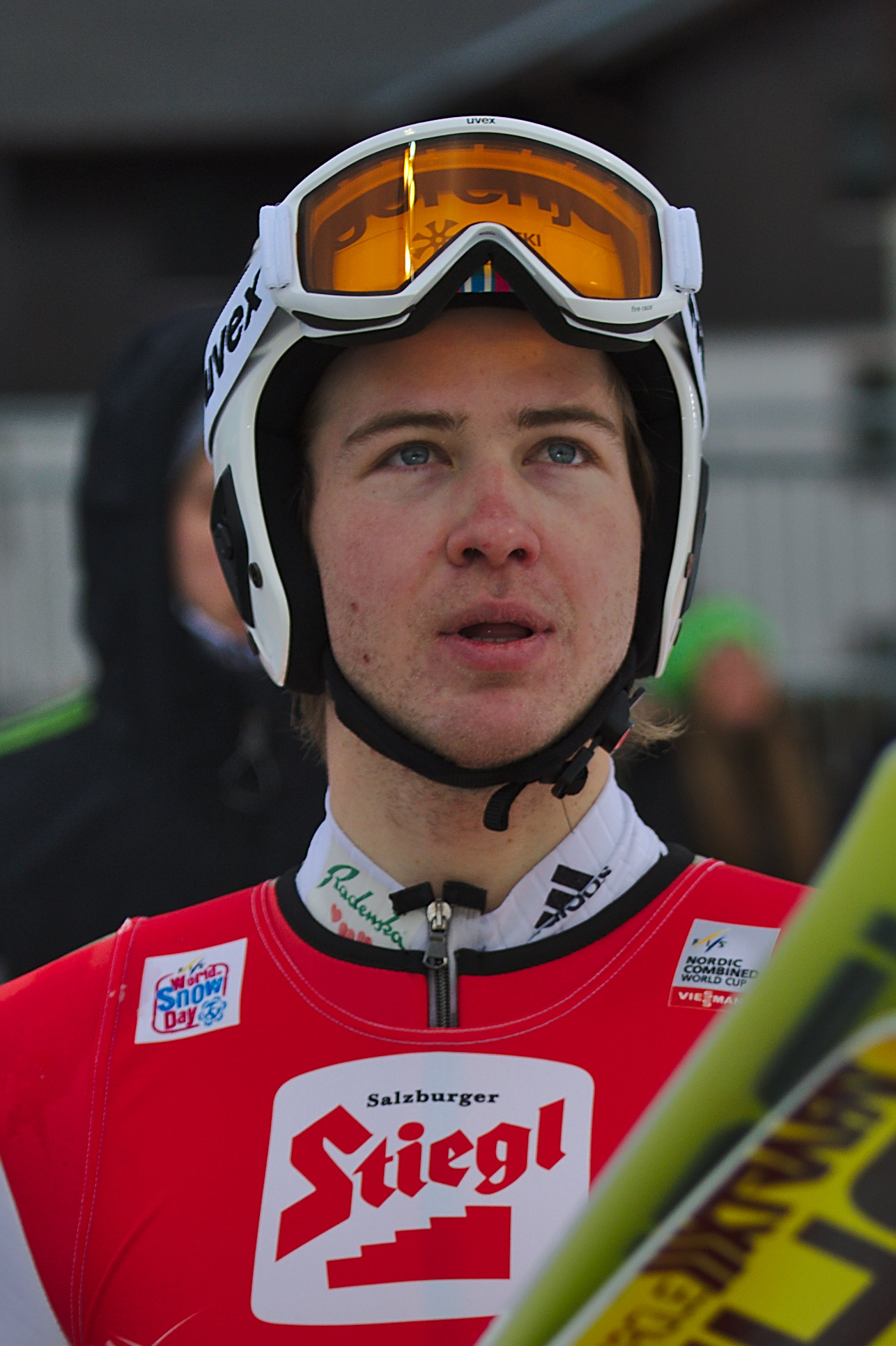

Personal information
- Nationality: Slovenia
- Born: 22 July 1991 (age 34) Maribor, Slovenia

Sport
- Sport: Skiing

World Cup career
- Seasons: 2007–2019
- Indiv. starts: 95

Marjan Jelenko (born 22 July 1991 in Maribor) is a Slovenian former Nordic combined skier and junior world champion.

He won a gold medal and a silver medal at the Junior World Championships in Otepää in 2011. At the FIS Nordic World Ski Championships 2011 in Oslo, Jelenko finished 27th in the 10 km individual normal hill event.
