= Samuel Costa (skier) =

Italian Nordic combined skier (born 1992)

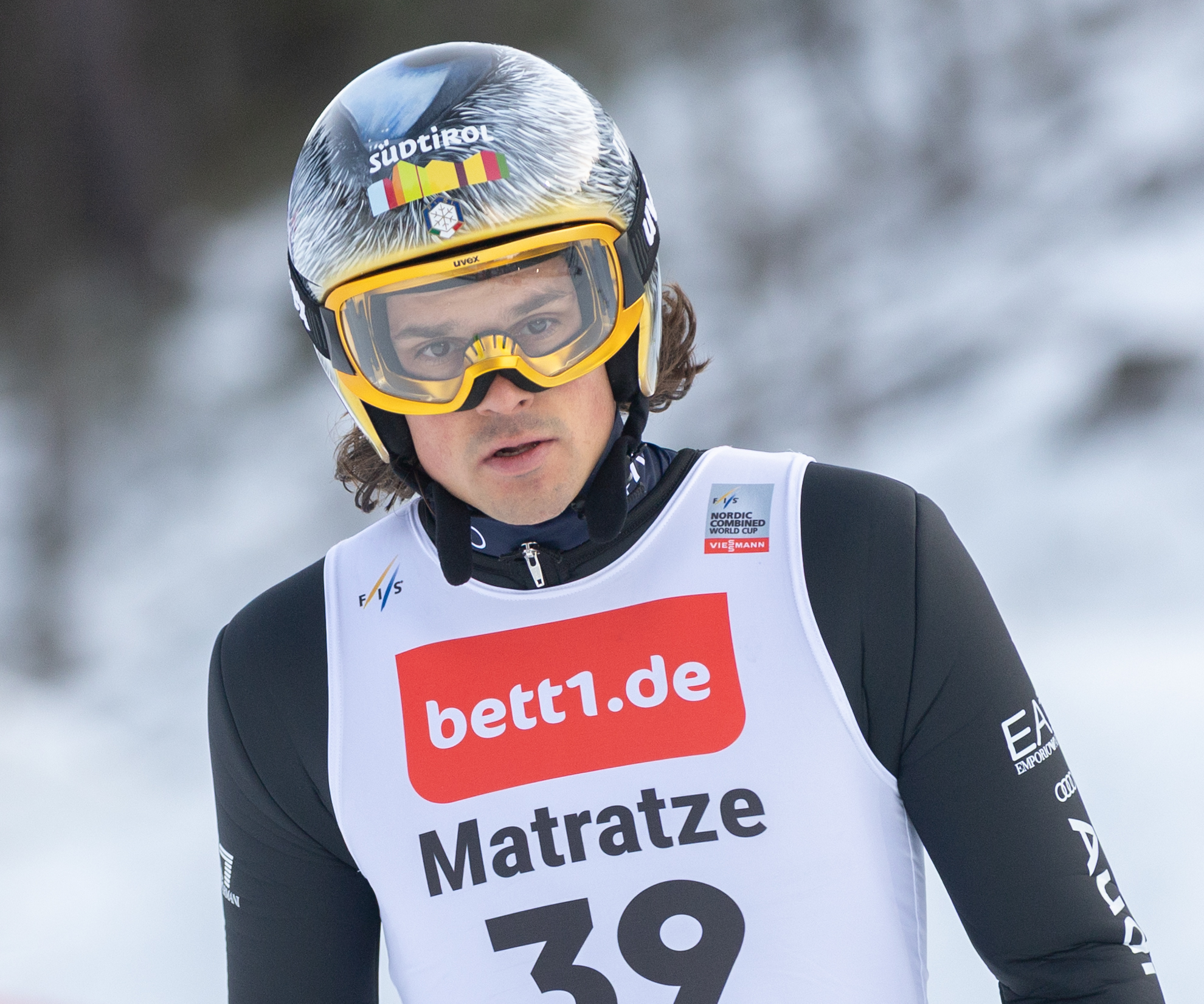
- Costa in 2026

Personal information
- Nationality: Italy
- Born: 30 November 1992 (age 33) Bolzano, Italy

Sport
- Sport: Skiing
- Club: Fiamme Oro

World Cup career
- Seasons: 2012–2026
- Indiv. starts: 182
- Indiv. podiums: 2
- Team podiums: 2

Samuel Costa (born 30 November 1992) is a former Italian Nordic combined skier. He was born in Bolzano. He competed at the FIS Nordic World Ski Championships 2011 in Oslo, the FIS Nordic World Ski Championships 2013 in Val di Fiemme, the 2014 Winter Olympics in Sochi, the 2022 Winter Olympics in Beijing and at the 2026 Winter Olympics in Milan-Cortina.

== Record ==
=== Olympic Games ===
Event	Normal hill	Large hill	Team relay
(Russia) 2014 Sochi	30	—	8
(China) 2022 Beijing	—	38	9
(Italy) 2026 Milano Cortina	13	23	4
