= Yoshito Watabe =

Japanese Nordic combined skier (born 1991)

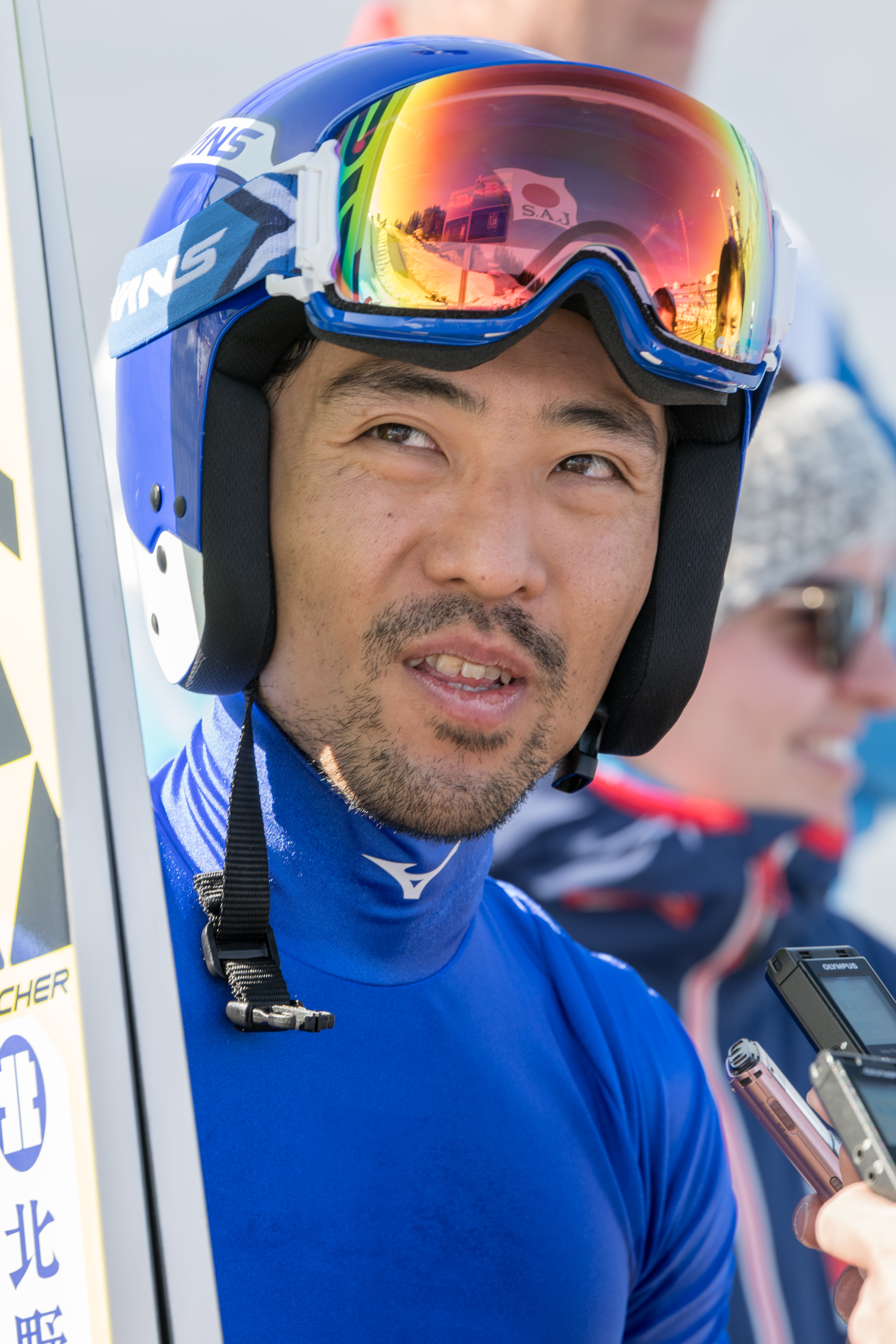
- Watabe in 2019

Medal record

Men's Nordic combined

Representing Japan

Olympic Games
Bronze medal – third place	2022 Beijing	Team LH

World Championships
Bronze medal – third place	2017 Lahti	Team sprint
Bronze medal – third place	2019 Seefeld	Team NH

Yoshito Watabe (渡部善斗, Watabe Yoshito; born 4 October 1991 in Hakuba, Nagano) is a Japanese Nordic combined skier who has competed since 2007. He skis with the Waseda University club. He has one FIS Nordic Combined World Cup podium from Oslo in season 2012–13 FIS Nordic Combined World Cup. His older brother Akito is one of the most successful athletes in Nordic combined history.
