= Miroslav Dvořák (skier) =

Czech Nordic combined skier (born 1987)

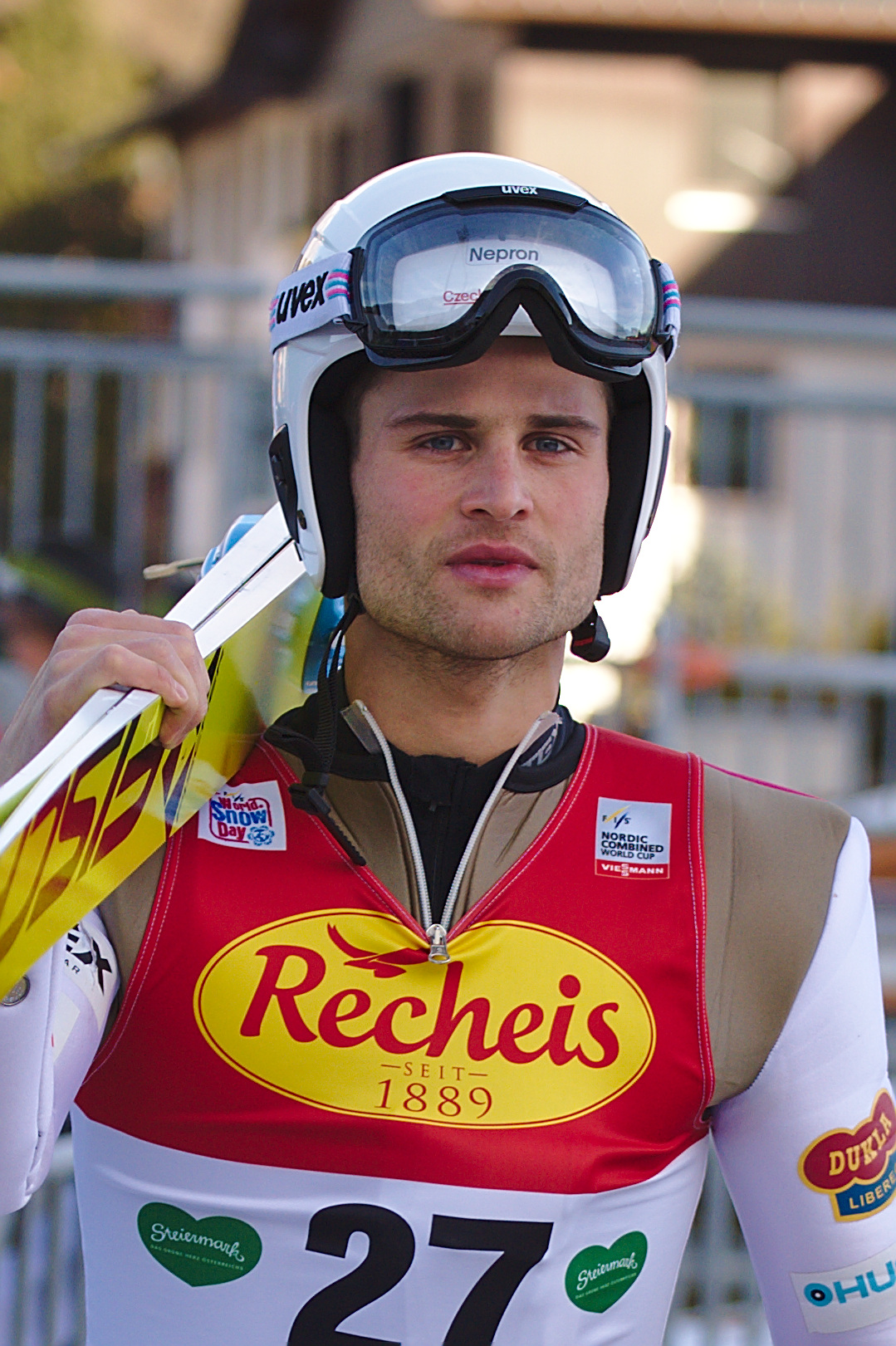

Personal information
- Born: 3 March 1987 (age 39) Liberec, Czechoslovakia

Sport
- Sport: Skiing
- Club: ASO Dukla Liberec

World Cup career
- Seasons: 2006–2019
- Indiv. starts: 143
- Indiv. podiums: 4

Miroslav Dvořák (born 3 March 1987) is a retired Czech Nordic combined skier who competed from 2003 until 2019. At the 2010 Winter Olympics, he finished eighth in the 4 x 5 km team, 39th in the 10 km individual normal hill, and 28th in the 10 km individual large hill events. He improved his results four years later, in Sochi. He was part from the Czech team that finished seventh, and in the individual races, Dvořák got was 29th in the 10 km individual normal hill, and 11th in the 10 km individual large hill events.

Dvořák's best finish at the FIS Nordic World Ski Championships was sixth in the 4 x 5 km team event at Liberec in 2009 while his best individual finish was 16th in the 10 km mass start event at those same championships.

He has four World Cup podium finishes, all of them in third place.
