= La Transjurassienne =

Transjurassienne
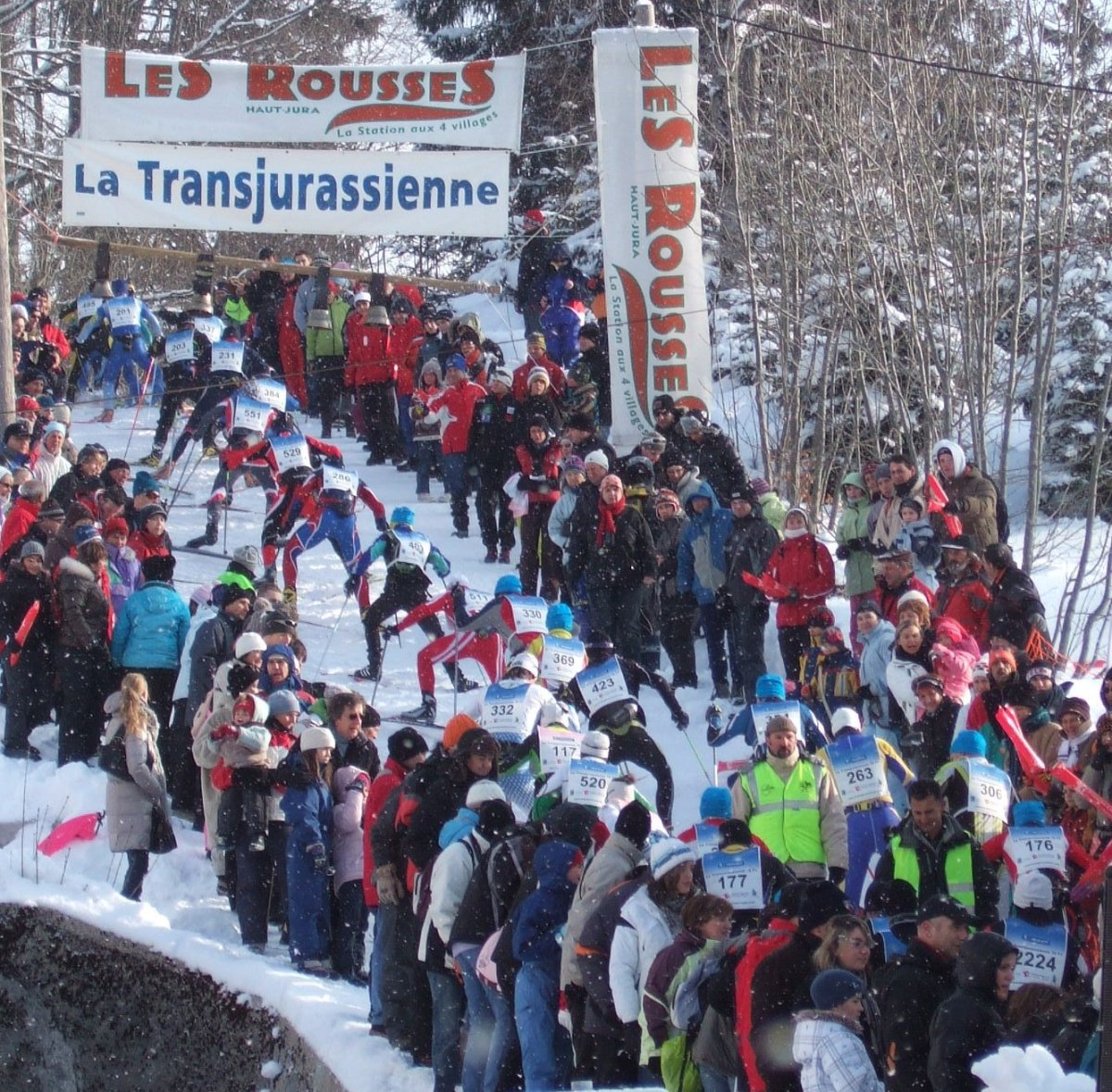
- Transjurassienne
- Status: active
- Genre: sporting event
- Date: February
- Frequency: annual
- Location: Jura Mountains
- Country: France & Switzerland
- Inaugurated: 1980

The Transjurassienne is an annual cross-country ski race (ski marathon) held on the second Weekend of February between Lamoura and Mouthe in the French Jura mountains. It debuted in 1980 and has been a part of Worldloppet since 1981. It is also part of the FIS Marathon Cup and the biggest cross-country skiing event in France. More than 4,000 skiers participate over the two days each year. Saturday is devoted to classic-style with races taking place over 25 km and 50 km. The main race takes place on Sunday - the 76 km long Tranjurassienne in skating-style - the longest skating race on the Worldloppet tour. Shorter races over 57 km and 25 km are also offered. Participation is open to anyone from the age of 16, and while no licence is required to sign up, the organisers demand a medical certificate to demonstrate the ability to take part in a long-distance skiing event.

== Track ==
The traditional 76 km course connects the villages Lamoura (1120m), Prémanon, Les Rousses, Bois-d'Amont, Le Brassus (Switzerland), Bellefontaine, Chapelle-des-Bois, Le Pré Poncet, Chaux-Neuve, Petite-Chaux and Mouthe (930m). The total ascent is around 1000m. Difficulties include the ascent to Risoux (the highest point at 1237m), the fast and tricky descent to Bellefontaine and a short but steep ascent before Le Pré Poncet after 65 km. The area is also renowned for its freezing conditions as temperatures can hit -20 °C and lower.

== See also ==
- Skiing and skiing topics
- Côte Feuillée stadium
