= Morbier, Jura =

Commune in Bourgogne-Franche-Comté, France

Morbier
- Commune
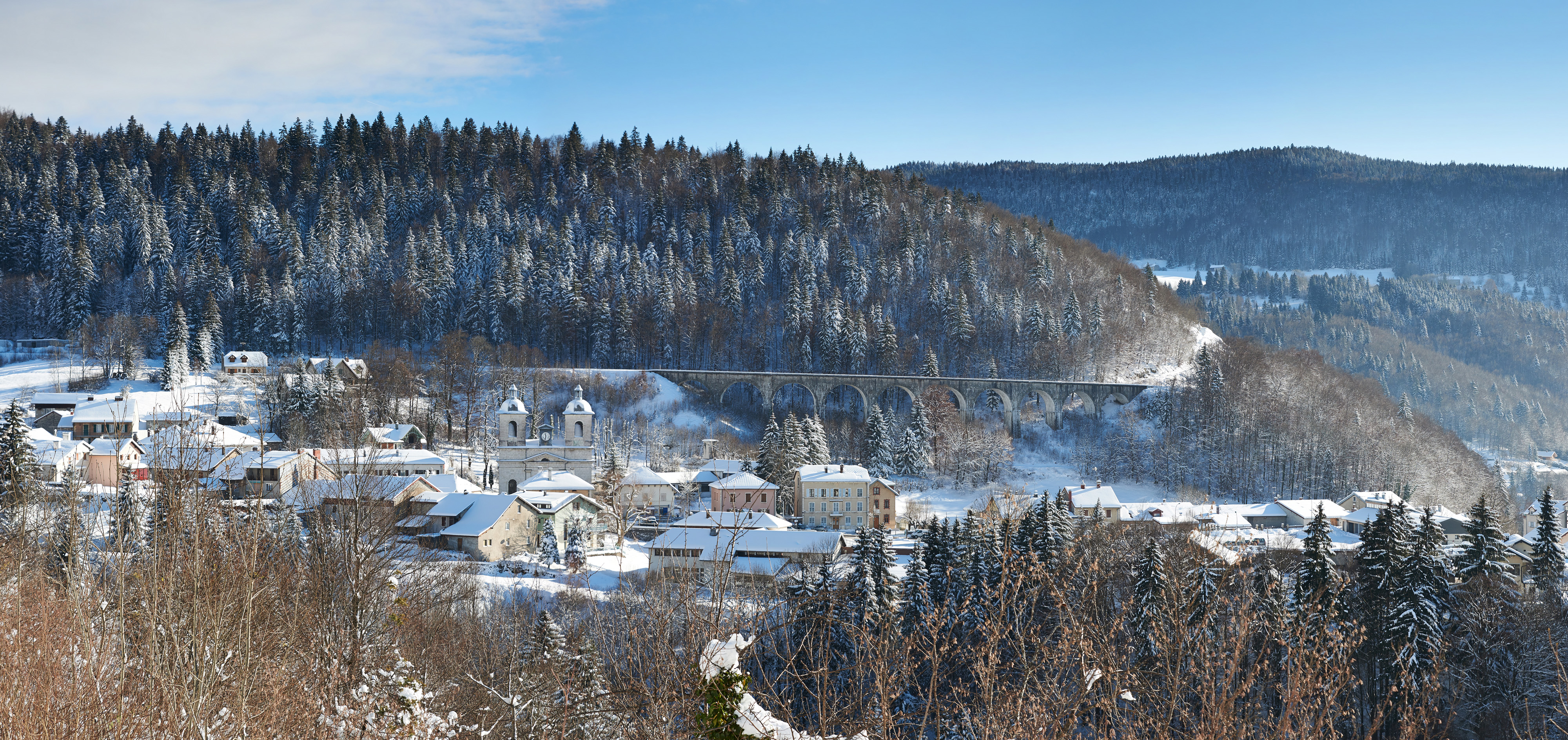
- A view of Morbier

- Coat of arms
- Location of Morbier
- Location within France Location within Bourgogne-Franche-Comté
- Coordinates: 46°32′15″N 6°01′03″E
- Country: France
- Region: Bourgogne-Franche-Comté
- Department: Jura
- Arrondissement: Saint-Claude
- Canton: Hauts de Bienne
- Intercommunality: CC Haut-Jura Arcade

Government
  - Mayor (2023–2026): Philippe Huguenet
- Area^{1}: 34.84 km^{2} (13.45 sq mi)
- Highest elevation: 1,180 m (3,870 ft)
- Lowest elevation: 650 m (2,130 ft)
- Population (2023): 2,456
  - Density: 70.49/km^{2} (182.6/sq mi)
- Time zone: UTC+01:00 (CET)
  - Summer (DST): UTC+02:00 (CEST)
- INSEE/Postal code: 39367 /39400
- ^{1} French Land Register data, which excludes lakes, ponds, glaciers > 1 km^{2} (0.386 sq mi or 247 acres) and river estuaries.

Morbier (French pronunciation: [mɔʁbje]) is a commune in the Jura department in the Bourgogne-Franche-Comté region in Eastern France. From 1680 to 1920, Morbier was, with Morez, the centre of Comtoise clock production. It gave its name to the Morbier cheese, which is produced in a larger area in the Jura Mountains. It is part of Haut-Jura Regional Natural Park.

== Population ==
In January 2007, Morbier absorbed the formerly independent commune of Tancua. Population data in the table below before 2007 refer to the commune of Morbier without Tancua.

Historical population

Year	Pop.	±% p.a.
1793	1,880	—
1800	1,880	+0.00%
1806	1,903	+0.20%
1821	1,911	+0.03%
1831	2,042	+0.67%
1836	2,090	+0.47%
1841	2,087	−0.03%
1846	1,978	−1.07%
1851	1,944	−0.35%
1856	1,880	−0.67%
1861	1,660	−2.46%
1866	1,681	+0.25%
1872	1,681	+0.00%
1876	1,657	−0.36%
1881	1,577	−0.98%
1886	1,545	−0.41%
1891	1,573	+0.36%
1896	1,719	+1.79%
1901	1,456	−3.27%

Year	Pop.	±% p.a.
1906	1,466	+0.14%
1911	1,433	−0.45%
1921	1,002	−3.51%
1926	1,060	+1.13%
1931	1,020	−0.77%
1936	966	−1.08%
1946	886	−0.86%
1954	1,123	+3.01%
1962	1,217	+1.01%
1968	1,273	+0.75%
1975	1,547	+2.82%
1982	1,667	+1.07%
1990	1,964	+2.07%
1999	2,069	+0.58%
2007	2,248	+1.04%
2012	2,290	+0.37%
2017	2,292	+0.02%
2023	2,456	+1.16%

Source: EHESS and INSEE (2009–2023)

== See also ==
- Communes of the Jura department
