= Côte Feuillée stadium =

French ski jumping stadium

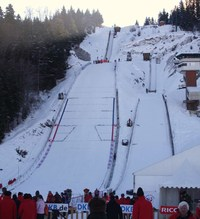
- The Chaux-Neuve ski jumps
- Location: Chaux-Neuve; France
- Coordinates: 46°40′44″N 6°07′59″E
- Opened: 1990

Size
- K–point: K 106, K 56, (Note: The second-largest hill is a K 56 and HS 64 in winter and a K 57 and HS 60 in summer. It is officially certified by the FIS in its winter configuration.) K 28, K 10, K8
- Hill size: HS 118, HS 64, HS 28

The Côte Feuillée stadium is a venue with ski jumping hills, located in Chaux-Neuve in the French department of Doubs, within the Bourgogne-Franche-Comté region.

Built with the 1990 Junior Nordic Ski World Championships in mind, the site has hosted Nordic Combined World Cup events since 1996. Over time, the Chaux-Neuve stage has become a key stop in this competition. The stadium also hosts summer competitions and, in 2018, served as the finish line for the Transjurassienne race.

The Côte Feuillée stadium has five ski jumping hills constructed in 1989 and 1995. The largest hill has been progressively improved and was upgraded to HS 118 status in 2010. (Note: HS: hill size, an English term used for "size of the ski jump." The associated number corresponds to the longest jump that can be made safely.) The hill record is held by Swiss jumper Sandro Hauswirth, with a distance of 121.5 meters.

== Geography ==
The ski jumps are located in Chaux-Neuve, in Franche-Comté. This small commune in the Doubs is situated at an altitude of 1,000 meters in the Jura Mountain Range, 6 km south of Mouthe, a village nicknamed "The Little Siberia of France" due to its record low temperature of −36.7 °C, the coldest ever recorded in France. Mouthe traditionally hosts the finish line for the Transjurassienne race.

== History ==
Ski jumping competitions have been held in Chaux-Neuve since the early 20th century. The Ski Club du Risoux was established in 1909. In 1965, the municipality of Chaux-Neuve initiated a project to construct an Olympic-sized ski jump, which was supported by a grant from the Directorate of Youth and Sports. However, difficulties encountered concerning earthworks and funding led to the project being terminated. Two decades later, neighboring communes collaborated to construct the stadium, primarily in preparation for the 1990 Junior Nordic Ski World Championships. The ski jump was constructed between 1989 and 1990 under the direction of architect Gérard Boucton, at an approximate cost of 15 million francs. The ski jump was inaugurated in January 1990; however, the Junior World Championships were relocated due to insufficient snow in Chaux-Neuve. In December 1990, the stadium hosted a round of the World Cup B. Since 1996, it has been the site of an annual Nordic Combined World Cup event.

In 2005, the hill was reclassified as HS 100. In 2010, the largest hill underwent renovations costing 6 million euros. These renovations included an extension and refrigeration of the track, which enabled the hill to be upgraded to HS 118. In 2012, the hills were equipped with plastic landing areas, allowing for year-round use.

At one juncture, Chaux-Neuve was under consideration as a prospective venue for the ski jumping events of the 2020 Winter Youth Olympic Games. However, it was ultimately not selected to host the ski jumping and Nordic combined events. Instead, the organizing committee chose the Tuffes site. In 2018, the finish line of the Transjurassienne race was set at the base of the hill for the first time due to insufficient snowfall in Mouthe.

== Description of the stadium ==
Technical details of the largest ski jump
Overview of a springboard	The Grand tremplin with the first red line representing point K and the second red line, point HS
K–point (Note: The ideal landing point on the hill is the K point.)	106
HS (Note: Since 2004, the FIS has used the HS (hill size) point to define the size of a ski jump (instead of the K point). The HS (hill size) is the distance between the end of the take-off ramp and the end of the landing area.)	118
Runway length	98 m
Table tilt angle	11 °
Angle of inclination of K–point	33.230°

The Côte Feuillée stadium features five ski jumps built in 1989 and 1995. Three jumps were constructed in 1989: the K 90, the K 57, and the K 28. The two beginner jumps, the K 10 and the K 8, were added in 1995.

The most significant increase has been observed in the K 90, which has been progressively upgraded to a K 106 (HS 118). In addition, the facility has included a refrigerated inrun track measuring 98 meters since 2010. As of 2016, the K 57 jump has a comparable system. Since 2012, the landing areas of the jumps have been covered in plastic, allowing for year-round use. Over time, the stadium has been equipped with additional facilities, including bleachers, a control tower, a rotunda serving as a locker room, a press room, a referee's room, a chairlift, and snow cannons. These upgrades were necessary to maintain the stadium's status as part of the international circuit.

The three largest jumps are certified by the French Ski Federation, while the two largest are also certified by the International Ski Federation.

Many cross-country ski trails, with lengths ranging from 1.5 to 2.5 kilometers, are situated close to the jump. In 2015, a footbridge was constructed, and the trail system underwent modifications in 2016. The course was shortened from 2.5 km to 2 km, enabling athletes to traverse the stadium five times, facilitating snow maintenance, and enhancing spectator engagement along the course. The cross-country race finish line is situated at the landing jump area.

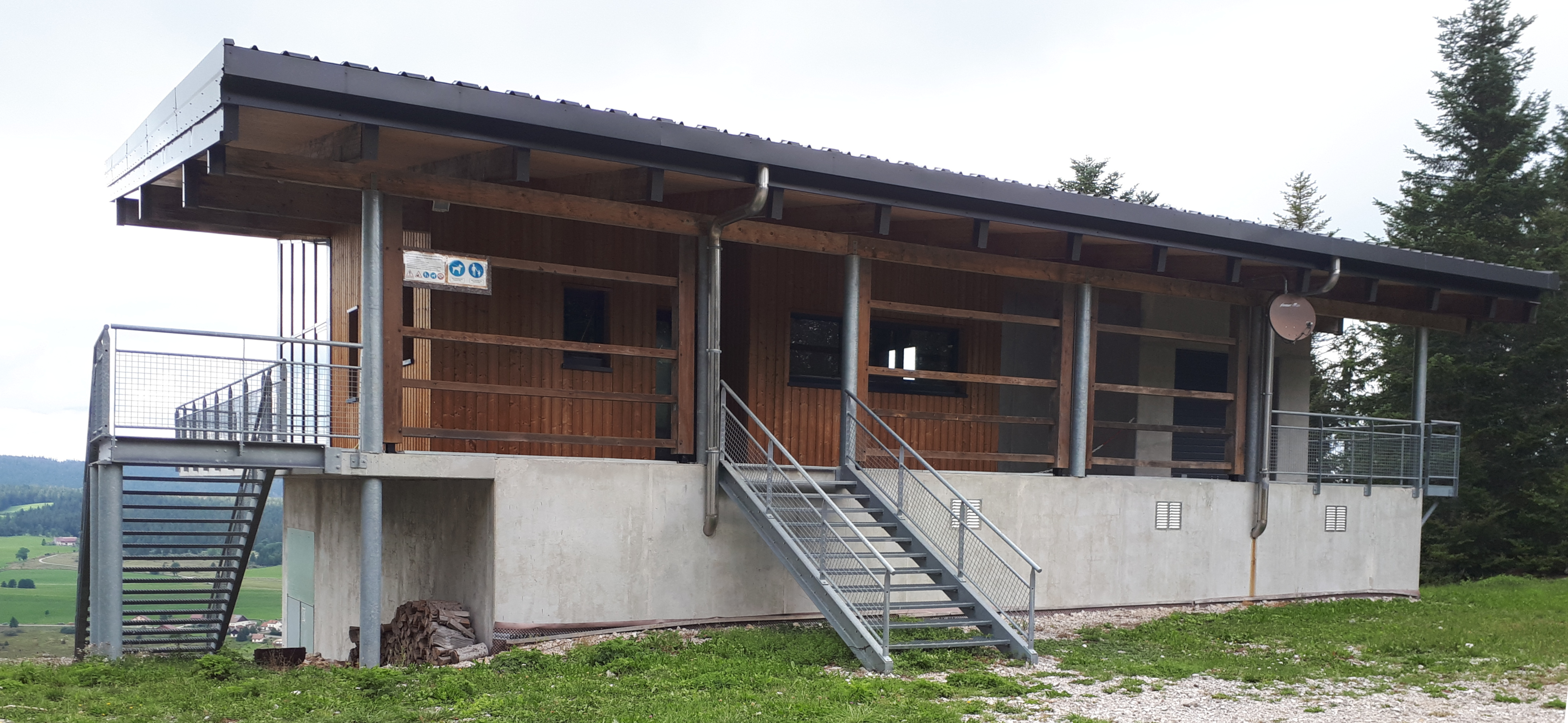
The building at the top of the ski jump

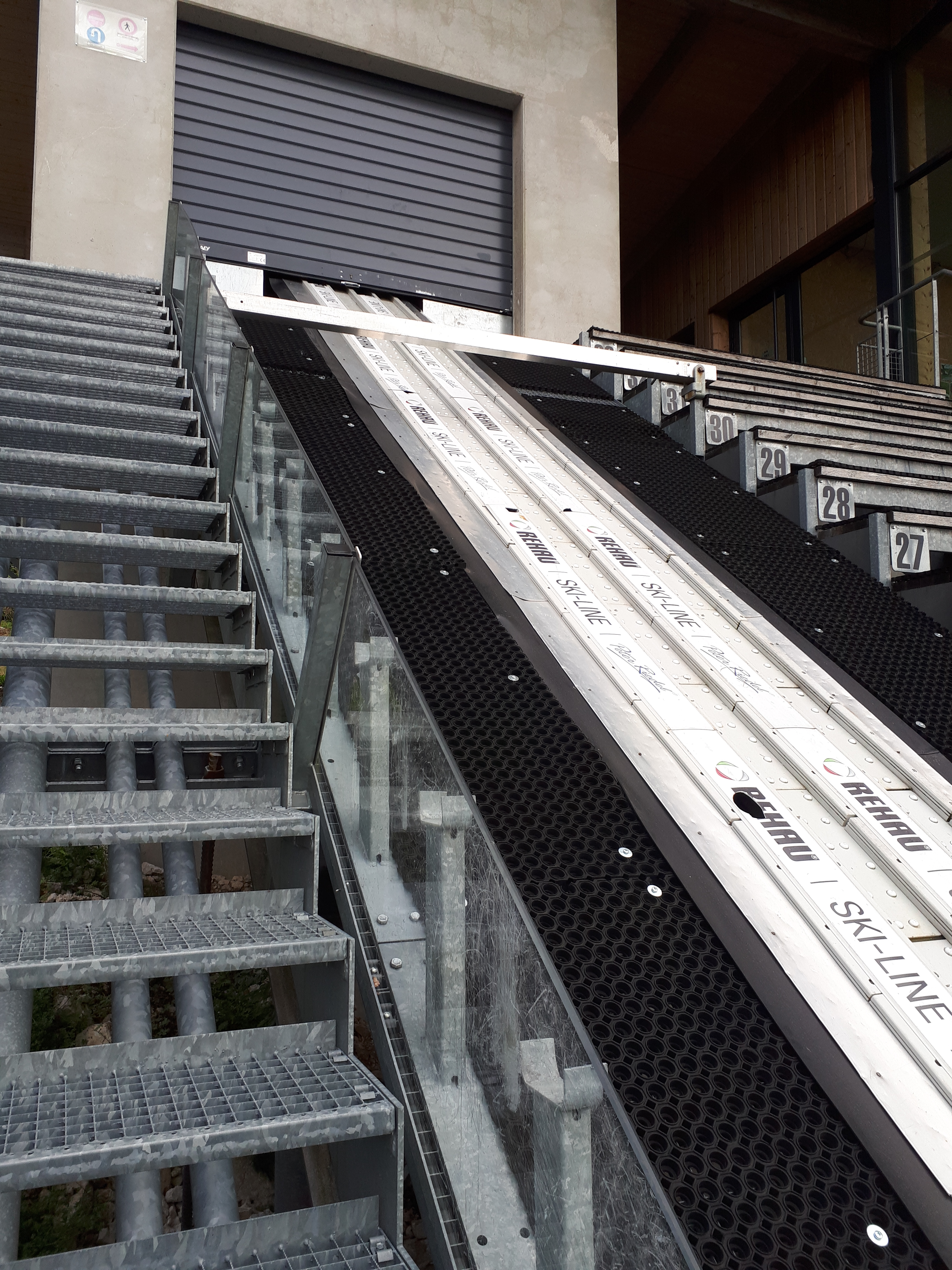
The starting area of the Grand tremplin

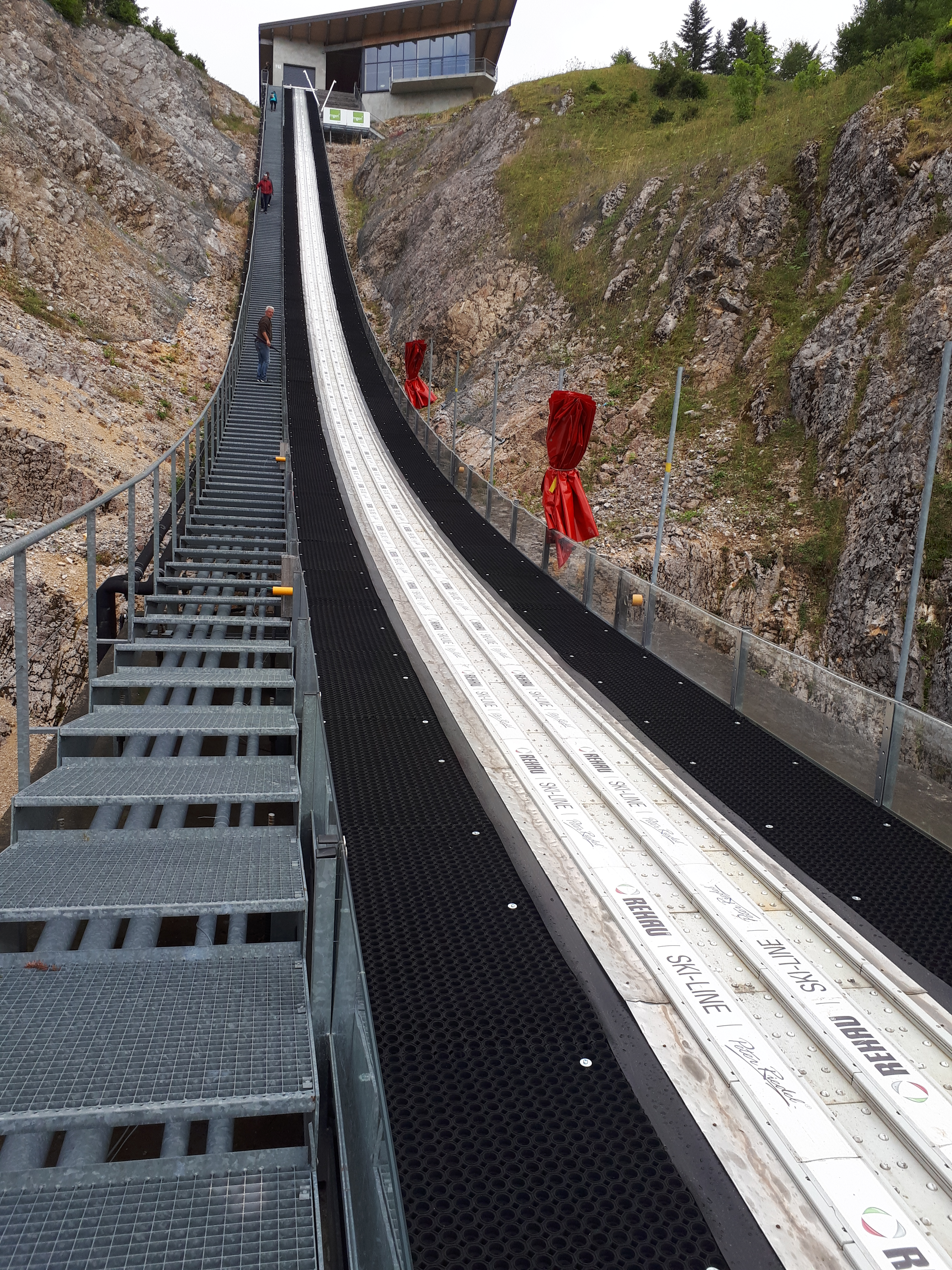
The springboard

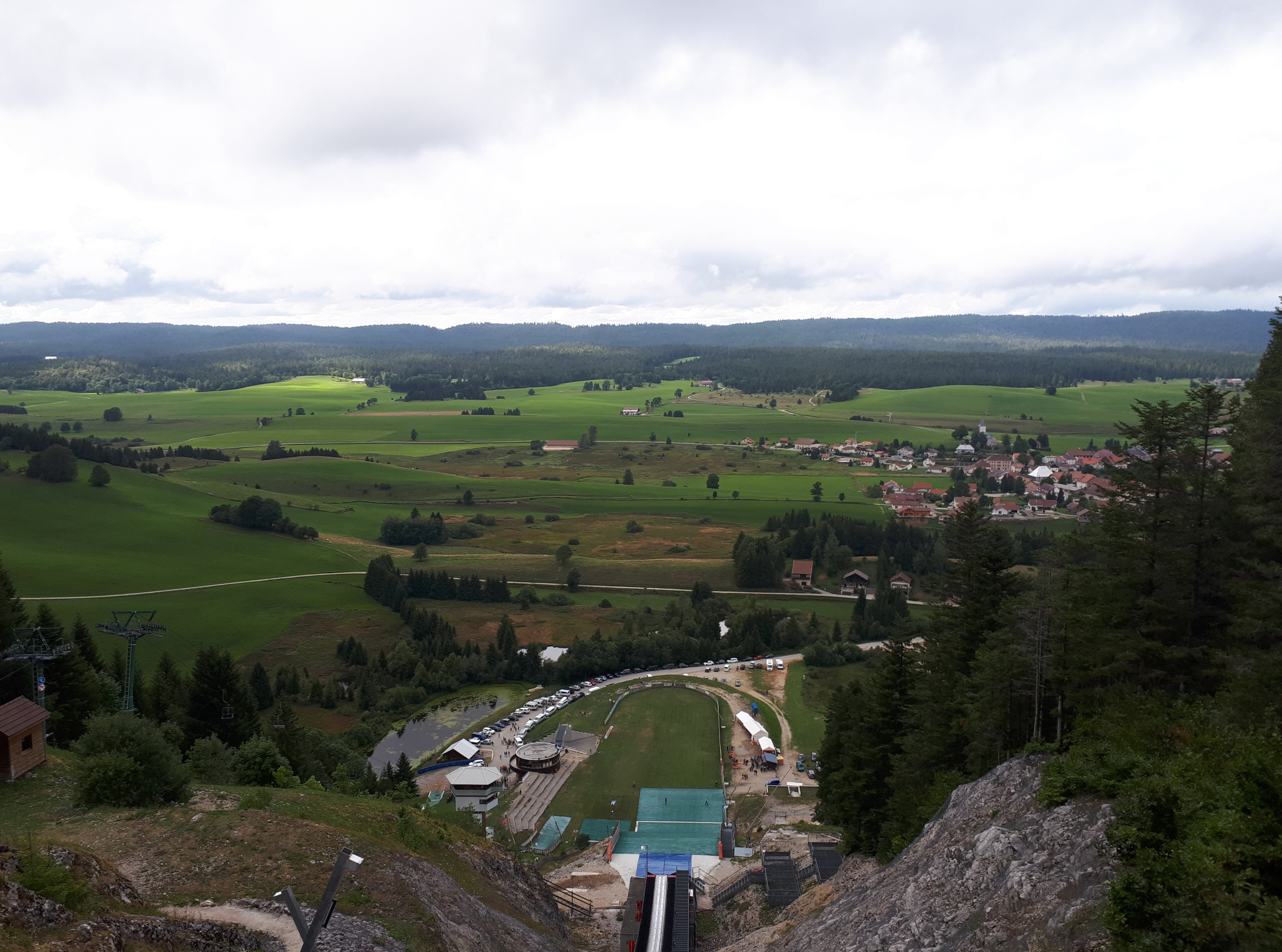
What a jumper sees when seated

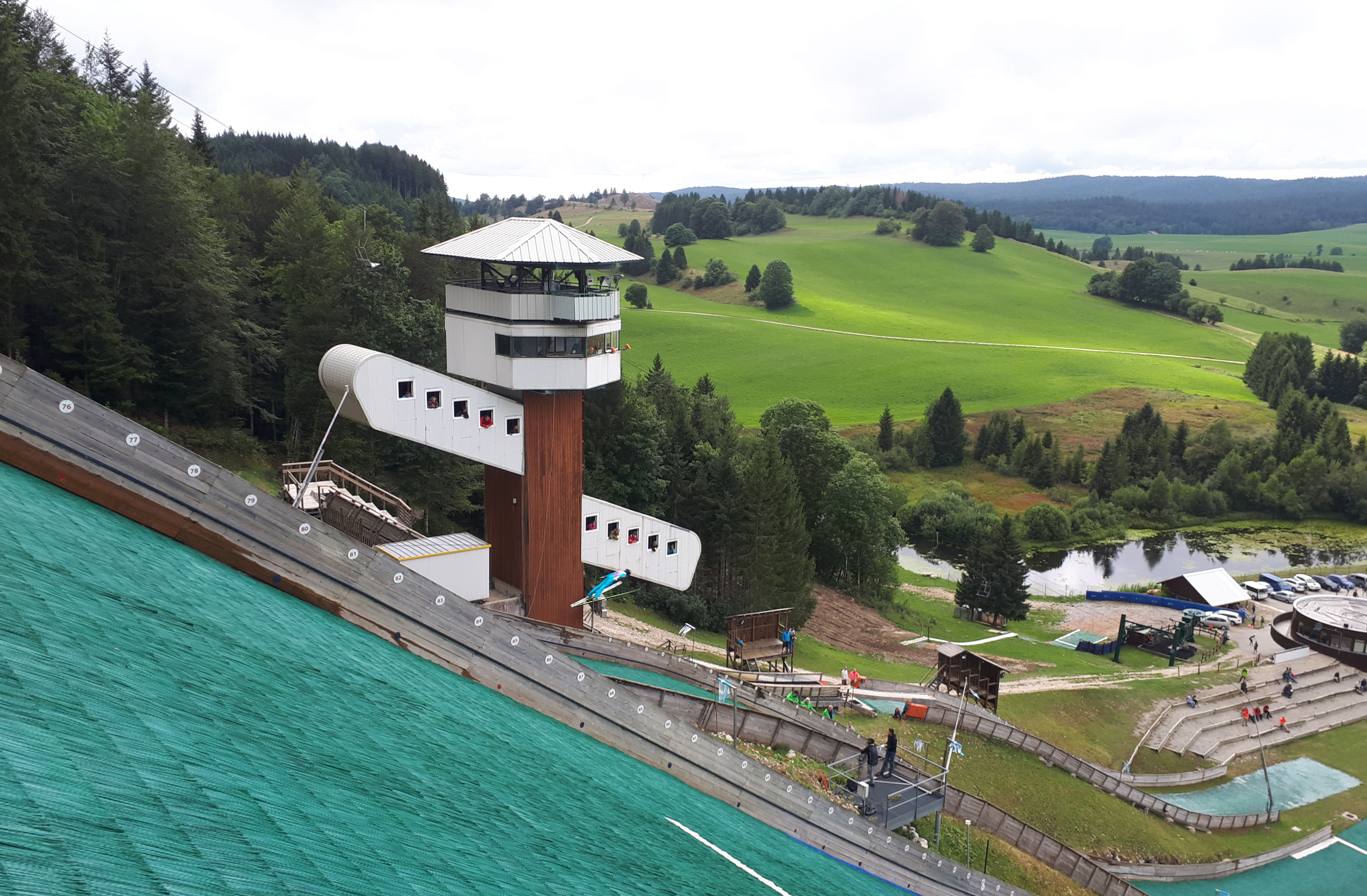
The judges' tower

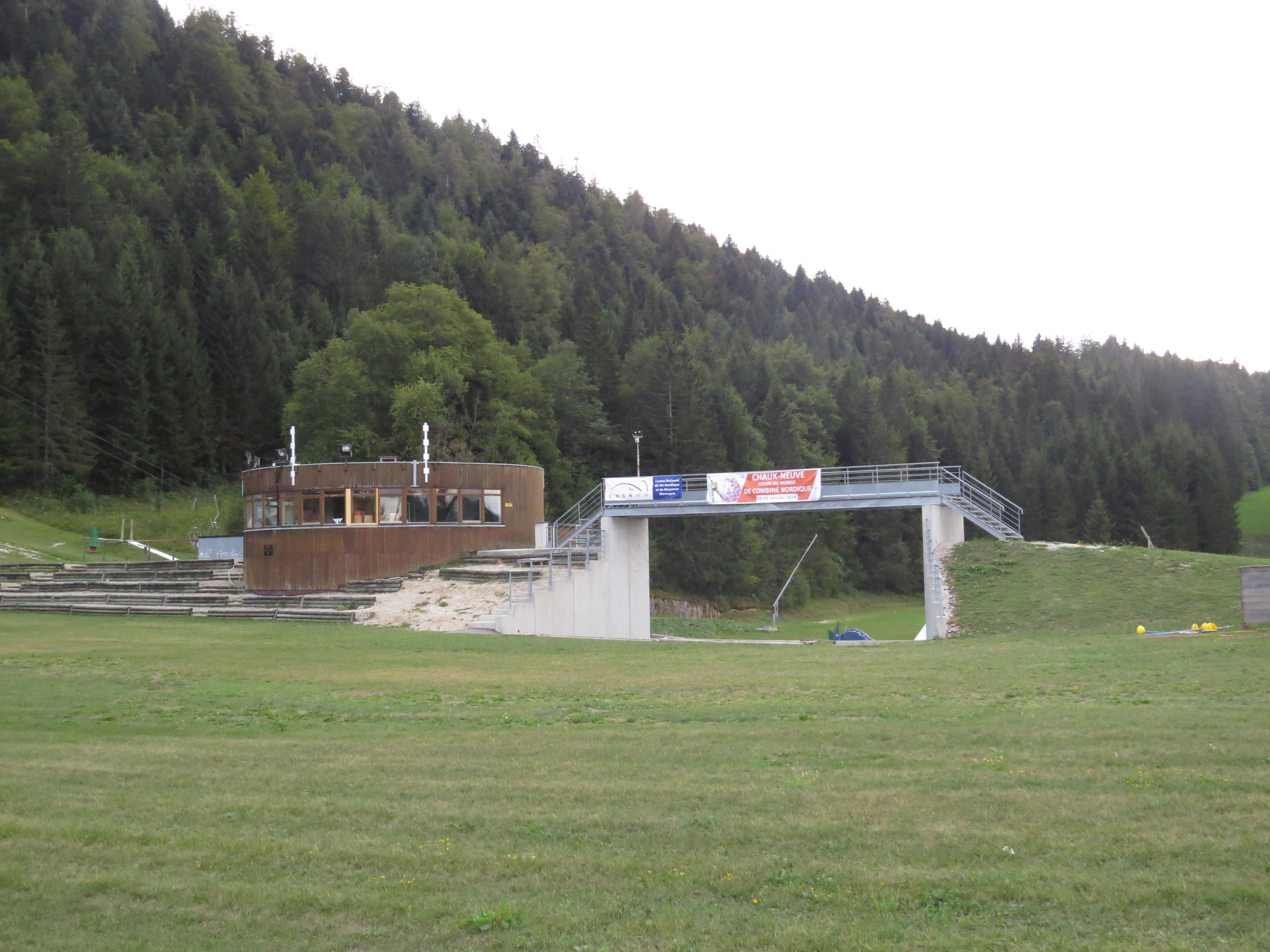
The footbridge used for cross-country events

== Events hosted at the stadium ==
=== Nordic combined World Cup ===
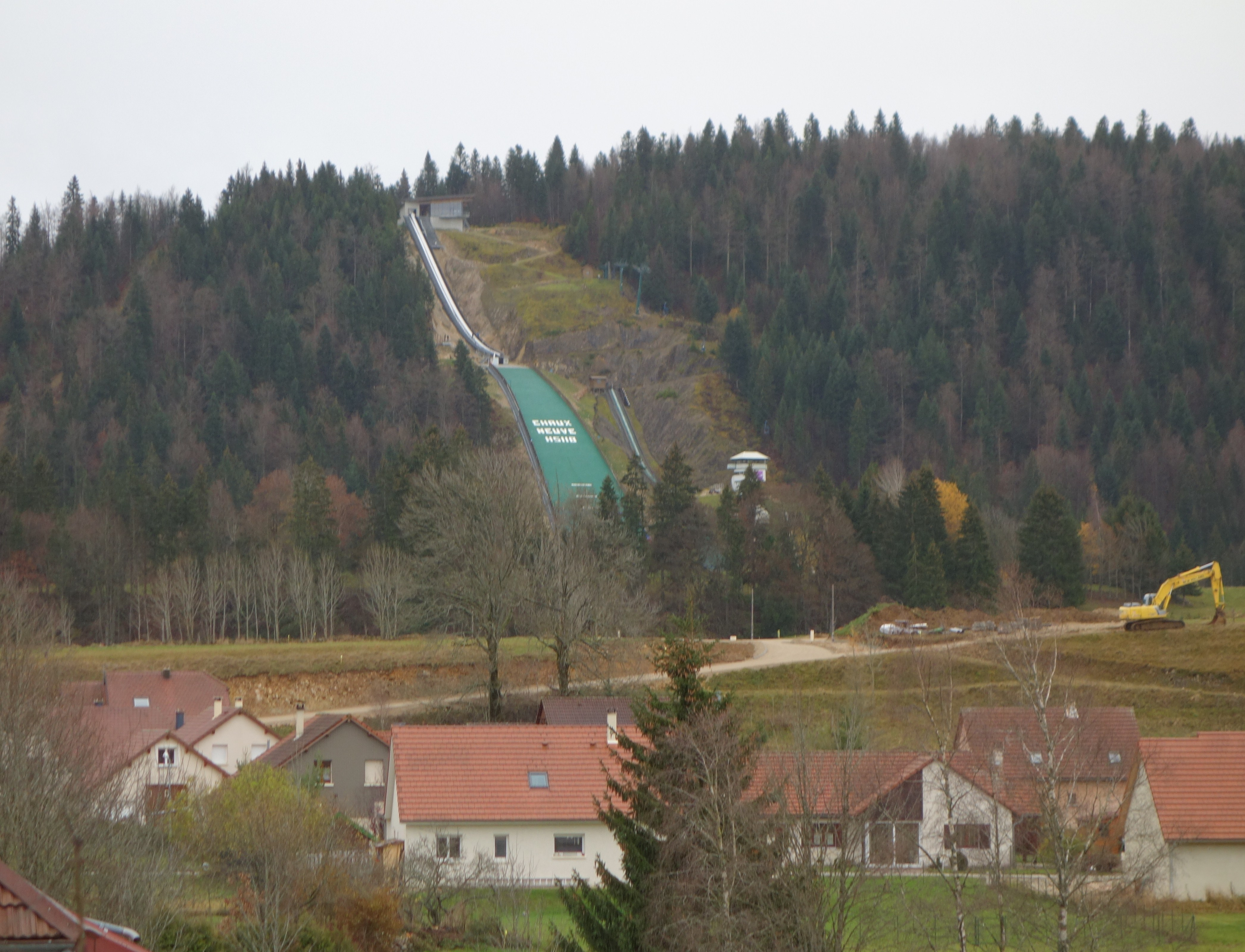
View of the village of Chaux-Neuve with the ski jump in the background

The event, originally scheduled for December 1993, was ultimately relocated to Saint-Moritz due to inclement weather conditions. Two years later, volunteers from three clubs (AS Mouthe, the Ski Club of Mont Noir, and the Risoux Club) established the Association for an International Nordic Stadium intending to manage international events at the ski jumping hill.

In 1996, the stadium hosted its inaugural Nordic Combined World Cup event, which paid tribute to local athletes Fabrice Guy and Sylvain Guillaume. In 1999 and 2000, the events were co-organized with Switzerland, as the stages were still held over a weekend. The ski jumping took place in Chaux-Neuve on Saturday, and the cross-country skiing event was held in Le Brassus (Canton of Vaud) on Sunday. However, due to a broadcasting rights’ issue, the competitions could not be aired live.

In 2003, the event exhibited a deficit of €45,000. In 2009, the competition returned, having been revitalized by the participation of Jason Lamy-Chappuis. The event attracted approximately 30,000 international spectators over a weekend, with a budget of around €400,000 and the involvement of 400 volunteers. In 2012, three races were held. Alessandro Pittin achieved a triple victory in front of 15,000 spectators. In 2019, the "Triple" was hosted in Chaux-Neuve, replacing Seefeld in Tirol.

For fifteen years, this event has become a significant and integral component of the Nordic Combined World Cup. The event is held in high regard by numerous athletes, including Felix Gottwald, Mario Stecher, and Jason Lamy-Chappuis, who compares it to the "Alpe d'Huez of Nordic Combined." In the 2020 season, no World Cup events were held due to the scheduling of the Winter Youth Olympic Games. The 2021 edition was similarly cancelled as a consequence of the global pandemic caused by the SARS-CoV-2 virus. The organizers were required to attract a significant number of spectators to balance the event's budget and were concerned about the potential impact of a closed-door edition. The World Cup resumed its place on the calendar in 2023. In 2022, it was announced that the associations responsible for the World Cups in Chaux-Neuve and the Station des Rousses (cross-country skiing) would merge into Nordic Événements. However, the 2023 edition was ultimately canceled due to a lack of snow, and the 2024 competition was also called off due to insufficient financial resources.

=== Summer Grand Prix of Nordic combined ===
In the wake of the 2024 World Cup's cancellation, the organizing committee has pivoted its focus to hosting races for the 2024 Summer Grand Prix.

=== Other competitions ===
The ski jump was originally constructed with the 1990 Nordic Junior World Ski Championships in mind, scheduled to take place in late January 1990. However, due to the rapid melting of the snow, the junior championships could not be held on the ski jump as planned. Instead, the inaugural event was held on January 14, 1990, with an OPA Cup.

After the conclusion of construction, the stadium served as the venue for a World Cup B event in December 1990. The race was won by Fabrice Guy, a local athlete. The ski jump has also been used for the French national championships, notably in 2015, and the Swiss championships in ski jumping and Nordic combined. In March 2018, the finals of the OPA Nordic Combined Cup and the Alpen Cup in ski jumping were held at the site. During these events, Sandro Hauswirth, a Swiss athlete, set the hill record with a jump of 121.5 meters.

Summer competitions, including ski jumping and Nordic combined (on rollerskis), have been organized at the hill since its creation.

== Results and records ==
=== Results of World Cup competitions ===
Results of Nordic Combined World Cup Competitions
Date	Format	First	Second	Third
February 11, 1996	Individual Gundersen – K 90 / 15 km	(Japan) Kenji Ogiwara	(Norway) Knut Tore Apeland	(Norway) Halldor Skard
January 18, 1998	Individual Gundersen – K 90 / 15 km	(Czech Republic) Milan Kučera	(Austria) Felix Gottwald	(France) Ludovic Roux
January 30, 1999	Individual Gundersen – K 90 / 15 km	(Finland) Samppa Lajunen	(United States) Todd Lodwick	(Czech Republic) Ladislav Rygl
February 26, 2000	Individual Gundersen – K 90 / 15 km	(Finland) Samppa Lajunen	(Finland) Jaakko Tallus	(Austria) Mario Stecher
January 12, 2003	Individual Gundersen – K 90 / 15 km	(Austria) Felix Gottwald	(Germany) Ronny Ackermann	(United States) Todd Lodwick
January 31, 2009	Individual Gundersen – HS 100 / 10 km	(Norway) Magnus Moan	(Finland) Anssi Koivuranta	(Germany) Björn Kircheisen
February 1, 2009	Individual Gundersen – HS 100 / 10 km	(Finland) Anssi Koivuranta	(Austria) Christoph Bieler	(Norway) Magnus Moan
January 16, 2010	Individual Gundersen – HS 100 / 10 km	(Norway) Magnus Moan	(France) Jason Lamy-Chappuis	(United States) Todd Lodwick
January 17, 2010	Individual Gundersen – HS 100 / 10 km	(Norway) Magnus Moan	(France) Jason Lamy-Chappuis	(Austria) Mario Stecher
January 22, 2011	Individual Gundersen – HS 118 / 10 km	(Austria) David Kreiner	(Norway) Mikko Kokslien	(Austria) Felix Gottwald
January 23, 2011	Individual Gundersen – HS 118 / 10 km	(France) Jason Lamy-Chappuis	(Austria) Felix Gottwald	(Norway) Mikko Kokslien
January 13, 2012	Individual Gundersen – HS 118 / 10 km	(Italy) Alessandro Pittin	(France) Jason Lamy-Chappuis	(Germany) Fabian Riessle
January 14, 2012	Individual Gundersen – HS 118 / 10 km	(Italy) Alessandro Pittin	(France) Jason Lamy-Chappuis	(Germany) Fabian Riessle
January 15, 2012	Individual Gundersen – HS 118 / 10 km	(Italy) Alessandro Pittin	(Norway) Jørgen Graabak	(Norway) Mikko Kokslien
January 12, 2013	Individual Gundersen – HS 118 / 10 km	(Germany) Tino Edelmann	(Austria) Bernhard Gruber	(Japan) Akito Watabe
January 13, 2013	Team sprint – HS 118 – 2 x 7.5 km	Germany I Eric Frenzel Tino Edelmann	Norway I Magnus Moan Jørgen Graabak	France I Sébastien Lacroix Jason Lamy-Chappuis
January 11, 2014	Individual Gundersen – HS 118 / 10 km	(Norway) Mikko Kokslien	(Norway) Magnus Krog	(Norway) Jørgen Graabak
January 12, 2014	Team sprint – HS 118 – 2 x 7.5 km	Germany II Tino Edelmann Fabian Rießle	Norway I Mikko Kokslien Jørgen Graabak	Germany I Johannes Rydzek Eric Frenzel
January 10, 2015	Individual Gundersen – HS 118 / 10 km	(Germany) Eric Frenzel	(Germany) Fabian Riessle	(Norway) Magnus Moan
January 11, 2015	Individual Gundersen – HS 118 / 10 km	(Norway) Magnus Moan	(Norway) Magnus Krog	(Austria) Bernhard Gruber
January 23, 2016	Individual Gundersen – HS 118 / 10 km	(Germany) Eric Frenzel	(Austria) Bernhard Gruber	(Japan) Akito Watabe
January 24, 2016	Individual Gundersen – HS 118 / 10 km	(Germany) Fabian Riessle	(Germany) Eric Frenzel	(Japan) Akito Watabe
January 21, 2017	Individual Gundersen – HS 118 / 10 km	(Germany) Johannes Rydzek	(Germany) Fabian Riessle	(Japan) Akito Watabe
January 22, 2017	Individual Gundersen – HS 118 / 10 km	(Norway) Fabian Riessle	(Germany) Johannes Rydzek	(Germany) Eric Frenzel
January 20, 2018	Individual Gundersen – HS 118 / 10 km	(Norway) Jan Schmid	(Japan) Akito Watabe	(Finland) Ilkka Herola
January 21, 2018	Per team HS 118 – 4 x 5 km	Norway Jan Schmid Espen Andersen Jarl Magnus Riiber Jørgen Graabak	Germany Eric Frenzel Fabian Rießle Johannes Rydzek Vinzenz Geiger	Finland Leevi Mutru Arttu Mäkiaho Ilkka Herola Eero Hirvonen
January 18, 2019	Individual Gundersen – HS 118 – 5 km	(Austria) Franz-Josef Rehrl	(Norway) Espen Bjørnstad	(Germany) Fabian Rießle
January 19, 2019	Individual Gundersen – HS 118 – 10 km	(Austria) Franz-Josef Rehrl	(Japan) Akito Watabe	(Germany) Fabian Rießle
January 20, 2019	Individual Gundersen – HS 118 – 15 km	(Austria) Mario Seidl	(Germany) Fabian Rießle	(Austria) Franz-Josef Rehrl

=== Results of Summer Grand Prix competitions ===
==== Women ====
Nordic Combined Summer Grand Prix competition results
Date	Format	Premier	Deuxième	Troisième
August 31, 2024	Individual Gundersen – HS 118 – 5 km	(Germany) Jenny Nowak	(Slovenia) Ema Volavšek	(Finland) Minja Korhonen
September 1, 2024	Individual compact test – HS 118 – 5 km	(Germany) Nathalie Armbruster	(Slovenia) Ema Volavšek	(Germany) Jenny Nowak

==== Men ====
Nordic Combined Summer Grand Prix competition results
Date	Format	Premier	Deuxième	Troisième
August 31, 2024	Individual Gundersen – HS 118 – 10 km	(Germany) Johannes Rydzek	(Germany) Manuel Faißt	(France) Laurent Muhlethaler
September 1, 2024	Individual compact test – HS 118 – 10 km	Competition cancelled due to bad weather.		

=== Hill records ===
==== Men ====
Men's hill records since the 2010 enlargement
Date	Athlete	Distance	Competition
December 14, 2010	(France) Jason Lamy Chappuis	115 meters	
January 8, 2011	(Switzerland) Luca Egloff	115.5 meters	
January 21, 2011	(Austria) Christoph Bieler	116.5 meters	World Cup
January 22, 2011	(Austria) Wilhelm Denifl	120 meters	World Cup
January 23, 2011	(Germany) Eric Frenzel	120 meters	World Cup
March 26, 2011	(France) Jason Lamy Chappuis	120.5 meters	French Nordic Ski Championships
March 28, 2015	(France) Vincent Descombes Sevoie	120.5 meters	French Nordic Ski Championships
March 9, 2018	(Switzerland) Sandro Hauswirth	121.5 meters	FIS Ski Jumping Alpen Cup

==== Women ====
Women's hill records since the 2010 enlargement
Date	Athlete	Distance	Competition
March 26, 2011	(France) Coline Mattel	111 meters	French Nordic Ski Championships
December 22, 2012	(France) Coline Mattel	105 meters	
December 22, 2012	(France) Coline Mattel	108 meters	
March 30, 2013	(France) Coline Mattel	113 meters	French Nordic Ski Championships

== Personalities linked to the stadium ==
- Fabrice Guy: Originally from Mouthe, he became the Olympic champion in Nordic combined at Albertville in 1992 and won the World Cup in the same year.
- Sylvain Guillaume: Originally from Foncine-le-Haut, he won two Olympic medals.
- Jason Lamy-Chappuis: Originally from Bois-d'Amont, he is the Olympic champion in 2010 at the Vancouver Winter Olympics, a four-time World Champion (individual in 2011 on the large hill in Holmenkollen and in 2013 on the small hill in Val di Fiemme, team events, and sprint relay), and a three-time Nordic combined World Cup winner (2010, 2011, and 2012).

== Bibliography ==
- Givre, Olivier (2006). Voyage dans le monde du saut : stade de saut à ski de la Côte Feuillée, Chaux-Neuve : un site, une histoire [Journey into the world of ski jumping: Côte Feuillée ski jumping stadium, Chaux-Neuve: a site, a history] (in French). Parc naturel régional du Haut-Jura.
- Nordic Evénements (2016). Dossier de presse Chaux-Neuve Coupe du Monde de Combiné Nordique 16–17 janvier 2016 [Press kit Chaux-Neuve Nordic Combined World Cup January 16–17, 2016] (PDF) (in French). Archived from the original (PDF) on March 31, 2018.
- Piguet, Jacques (2017). Épreuves internationales de ski Le Brassus Vallée de Joux [International ski events Le Brassus Vallée de Joux] (in French). Jacques Piguet. Archived from the original on January 2, 2022.
- L'émission spéciale "Chaux-Neuve a 20 ans" [The “Chaux-Neuve is 20” special] (Video) (in French). January 23, 2016. Archived from the original on January 2, 2022.
