= Les Rousses =

Commune in Bourgogne-Franche-Comté, France

- Commune
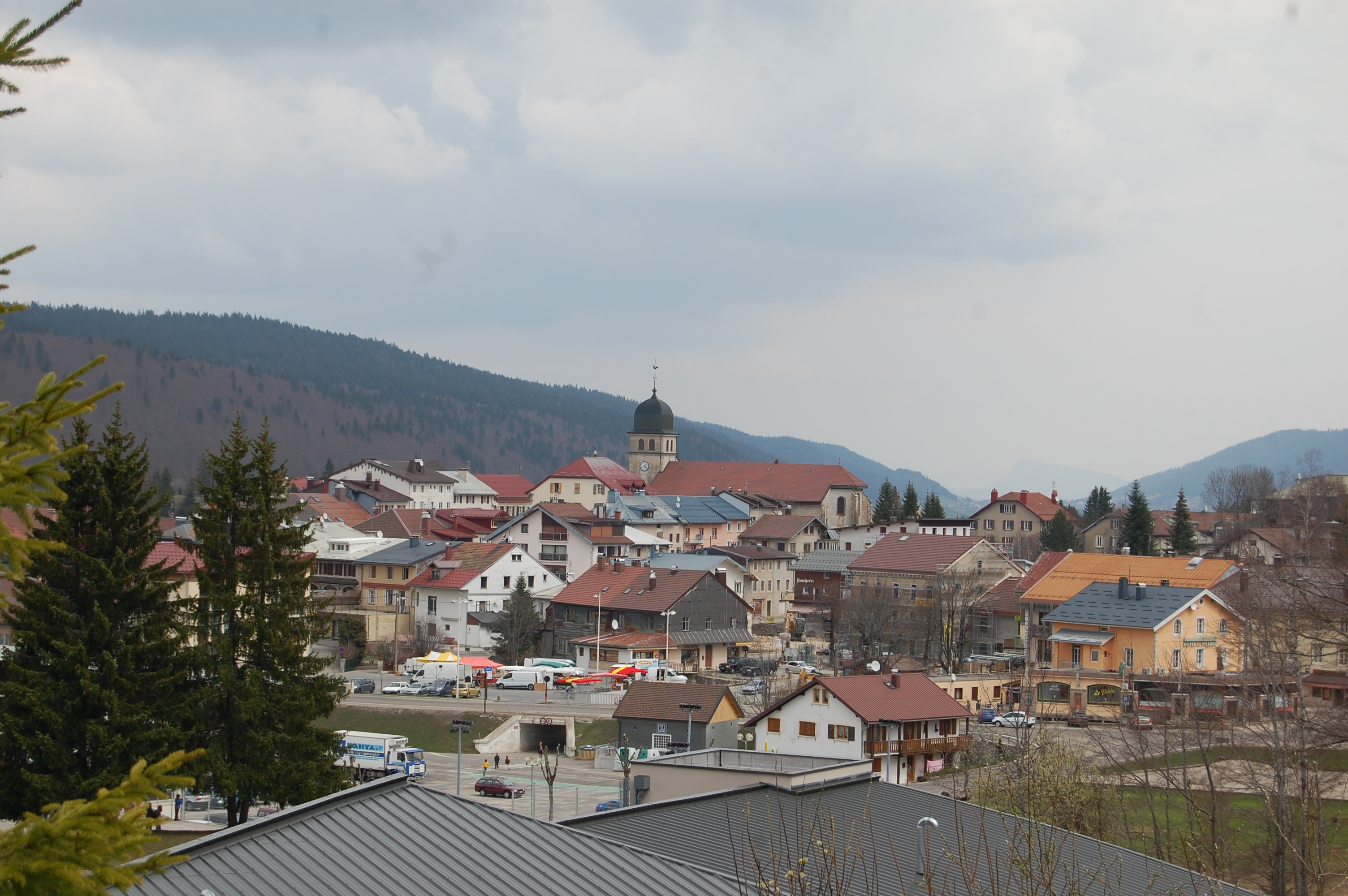
- The village of Les Rousses

- Coat of arms
- Location of Les Rousses
- Location within France Location within Bourgogne-Franche-Comté
- Coordinates: 46°29′11″N 6°03′45″E
- Country: France
- Region: Bourgogne-Franche-Comté
- Department: Jura
- Arrondissement: Saint-Claude
- Canton: Hauts de Bienne
- Intercommunality: Station des Rousses-Haut Jura

Government
  - Mayor (2020–2026): Christophe Matez
- Area^{1}: 38.00 km^{2} (14.67 sq mi)
- Highest elevation: 1,300 m (4,300 ft)
- Lowest elevation: 720 m (2,360 ft)
- Population (2023): 3,740
  - Density: 98.4/km^{2} (255/sq mi)
- Time zone: UTC+01:00 (CET)
  - Summer (DST): UTC+02:00 (CEST)
- INSEE/Postal code: 39470 /39220
- ^{1} French Land Register data, which excludes lakes, ponds, glaciers > 1 km^{2} (0.386 sq mi or 247 acres) and river estuaries.

Les Rousses (French pronunciation: [le ʁus]) is a commune in the canton of Hauts de Bienne of Jura department in the Bourgogne-Franche-Comté region in eastern France, on the Swiss border.

The Lac des Rousses is located northeast of the village of Les Rousses beside the road to the village of Bois d'Amont. The Lac de Lamoura is located southwest of the village of Les Rousses beside the road to the village of Lamoura. Other places include the village of Prémanon and La Cure, the transit point across the Swiss border towards Saint-Cergue.

== Climate ==
Climate data for Les Rousses (1981–2010 averages): elevation 1110m
Month	Jan	Feb	Mar	Apr	May	Jun	Jul	Aug	Sep	Oct	Nov	Dec	Year
Mean daily maximum °C (°F)	3.0 (37.4)	4.0 (39.2)	6.9 (44.4)	10.3 (50.5)	15.3 (59.5)	18.6 (65.5)	21.1 (70.0)	21.0 (69.8)	17.0 (62.6)	13.3 (55.9)	6.5 (43.7)	3.4 (38.1)	11.7 (53.1)
Daily mean °C (°F)	−1.5 (29.3)	−0.7 (30.7)	1.9 (35.4)	5.0 (41.0)	9.9 (49.8)	12.8 (55.0)	15.1 (59.2)	15.0 (59.0)	11.4 (52.5)	8.2 (46.8)	2.3 (36.1)	−0.5 (31.1)	6.6 (43.8)
Mean daily minimum °C (°F)	−5.9 (21.4)	−5.5 (22.1)	−3.1 (26.4)	−0.3 (31.5)	4.4 (39.9)	7.1 (44.8)	9.1 (48.4)	9.0 (48.2)	5.9 (42.6)	3.1 (37.6)	−1.9 (28.6)	−4.4 (24.1)	1.5 (34.6)
Average precipitation mm (inches)	177.5 (6.99)	159.4 (6.28)	157.7 (6.21)	140.8 (5.54)	161.3 (6.35)	155.4 (6.12)	140.8 (5.54)	148.0 (5.83)	152.8 (6.02)	172.5 (6.79)	173.2 (6.82)	195.8 (7.71)	1,935.2 (76.2)
Source: Meteociel

== Population ==
Historical population

Year	Pop.	±% p.a.
1793	2,501	—
1800	2,240	−1.56%
1806	2,159	−0.61%
1821	2,278	+0.36%
1831	2,187	−0.41%
1836	2,163	−0.22%
1841	2,017	−1.39%
1846	2,254	+2.25%
1851	2,395	+1.22%
1856	2,555	+1.30%
1861	2,581	+0.20%
1866	2,472	−0.86%
1872	2,527	+0.37%
1876	2,518	−0.09%
1881	2,545	+0.21%
1886	2,941	+2.93%
1891	2,476	−3.38%
1896	2,258	−1.83%
1901	2,195	−0.56%

Year	Pop.	±% p.a.
1906	2,148	−0.43%
1911	2,031	−1.11%
1921	1,701	−1.76%
1926	1,610	−1.09%
1931	1,571	−0.49%
1936	1,562	−0.11%
1946	1,533	−0.19%
1954	1,795	+1.99%
1962	1,731	−0.45%
1968	1,755	+0.23%
1975	2,061	+2.32%
1982	2,331	+1.77%
1990	2,840	+2.50%
1999	2,927	+0.34%
2007	3,017	+0.38%
2012	3,133	+0.76%
2017	3,630	+2.99%
2023	3,740	+0.50%

Source: EHESS and INSEE (1968-2023)

== Tourism ==
Les Rousses includes part of the Upper Jura Natural Park and Fort des Rousses (fr), an historical fortress that, until 1997, was used as a commando training site. The fortress includes an underground labyrinth used in training, that is open to the public.

Les Rousses has an extensive ski area, especially for cross-country skiing. Many villages have their own runs using a common lift pass.

- Alpine
  - Massif du Noirmont
  - Massif des Tuffes
  - Porte des Jouvencelles
  - Porte de la Darbella
  - Porte de la Serra
  - Porte de la Combe de lac
  - Porte de la Giraude
- Nordic
  - Secteur de Bellefontaine
  - Secteur du Risoux
  - Secteur de l'Orbe
  - Secteur de la Sambine
  - Secteur du Massacre
  - Secteur de Longchamois
  - Secteur de Lamoura/Serra

== See also ==
- Communes of the Jura department
