= Germerius =

Saint Germerius
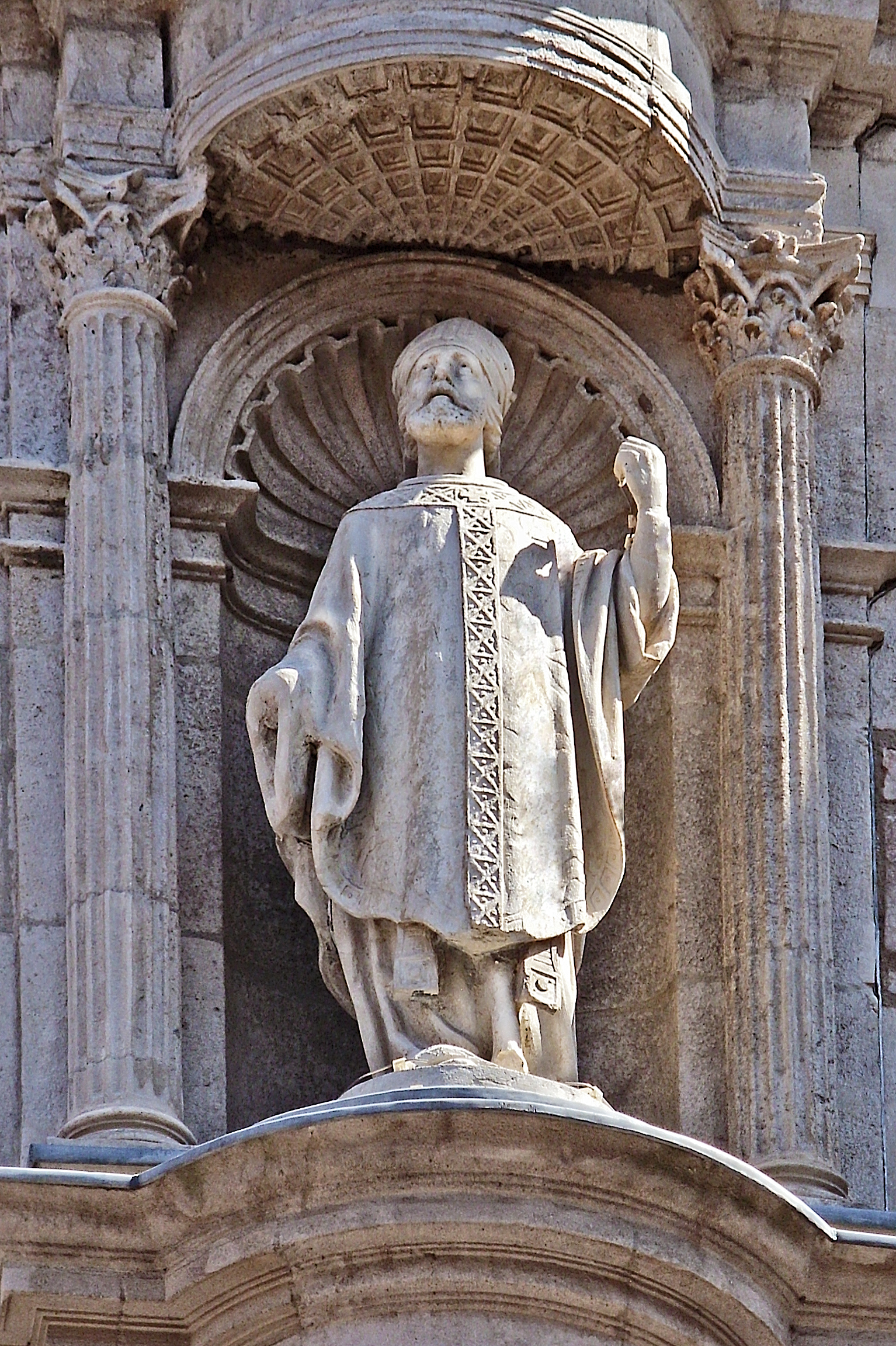
- Notre-Dame de la Dalbade in Toulouse, right Bishop Germerius and below St Sebastian.
- Born: ~480 AD
- Died: ~560 AD
- Venerated in: Roman Catholic Church; Eastern Orthodox Church
- Feast: May 16
- Patronage: abbey of Lézat

Saint Germerius (French: Saint Germier) (ca. 480- ca. 560 AD) was bishop of Toulouse from 510 to 560 AD. There is some question as to whether he actually existed. He is the patron saint of the abbey of Lézat.

He was a native of Angoulême, or possibly of Jerusalem.

After coming to Gaul from Jerusalem, he was ordained a deacon. He then received an instruction from an angel, telling him to go to Paris where he would be made a bishop at the age of thirty. He did so, and was made the bishop of Toulouse there.

According to one version of his story, on his way to Toulouse, he was summoned by the king Clovis I to the royal palace. There, Germerius gave the Eucharist to the king and his sons and heard their confessions. Later, Clovis asked for the bishop's prayers and offered in exchange whatever Germerius asked. Germerius told him that he wanted an estate in the Toulouse area, exactly, as much area as the shadow of his cloak could cover in Ducorum.

Clovis agreed to give Germerius an area of six miles around Ducorum, and issued a written charter of liberty to substantiate as much. Clovis then requested the bishop to remain a further twenty days, and he agreed to do so.

Upon his arrival in his new territory, Germerius founded two churches. One was dedicated to Saint Martin and the other to Saint Saturninus. The former has subsequently been identified as either the church of Saint-Martin in Ox, a village roughly 4 kilometers southwest of Muret, or the church of Saint-Martin of Roziniac. Both of these churches fell under the possession of the monastic community Germerius founded. Germerius also established the monastery of Saint-Germier, which took possession of all these properties.

Clovis is also reported to have given Germerius a number of other gifts, including vestments, the articles required for liturgical practices.

This version of the story is explicitly included in the life of Germerius published by the abbey, as it makes it clear that the estates of the monastery were given to it by the king himself.

He died at Ducorum. His feast day is May 16.
