= Tancua =

- Part of Morbier
- Location of Tancua
- Location within France Location within Bourgogne-Franche-Comté
- Coordinates: 46°31′32″N 5°58′48″E
- Country: France
- Region: Bourgogne-Franche-Comté
- Department: Jura
- Arrondissement: Saint-Claude
- Canton: Hauts de Bienne
- Commune: Morbier
- Area^{1}: 6.74 km^{2} (2.60 sq mi)
- Elevation: 889 m (2,917 ft)
- Highest elevation: 1,110 m (3,640 ft)
- Lowest elevation: 620 m (2,030 ft)
- Population (2004): 151
  - Density: 22.4/km^{2} (58.0/sq mi)
- Time zone: UTC+01:00 (CET)
  - Summer (DST): UTC+02:00 (CEST)
- Postal code: 39400
- ^{1} French Land Register data, which excludes lakes, ponds, glaciers > 1 km^{2} (0.386 sq mi or 247 acres) and river estuaries.

Tancua is a village in the department of Jura in the region of Bourgogne-Franche-Comté, France. Formerly a separate municipality, it was merged with Morbier on 1 January 2007. Its inhabitants are known as Quewans.

Tancua was, until well into the 20th century, mainly agricultural, especially for livestock breeding and dairy farming, with somewhat of a logging industry.
