= Morez =

- Part of Hauts de Bienne
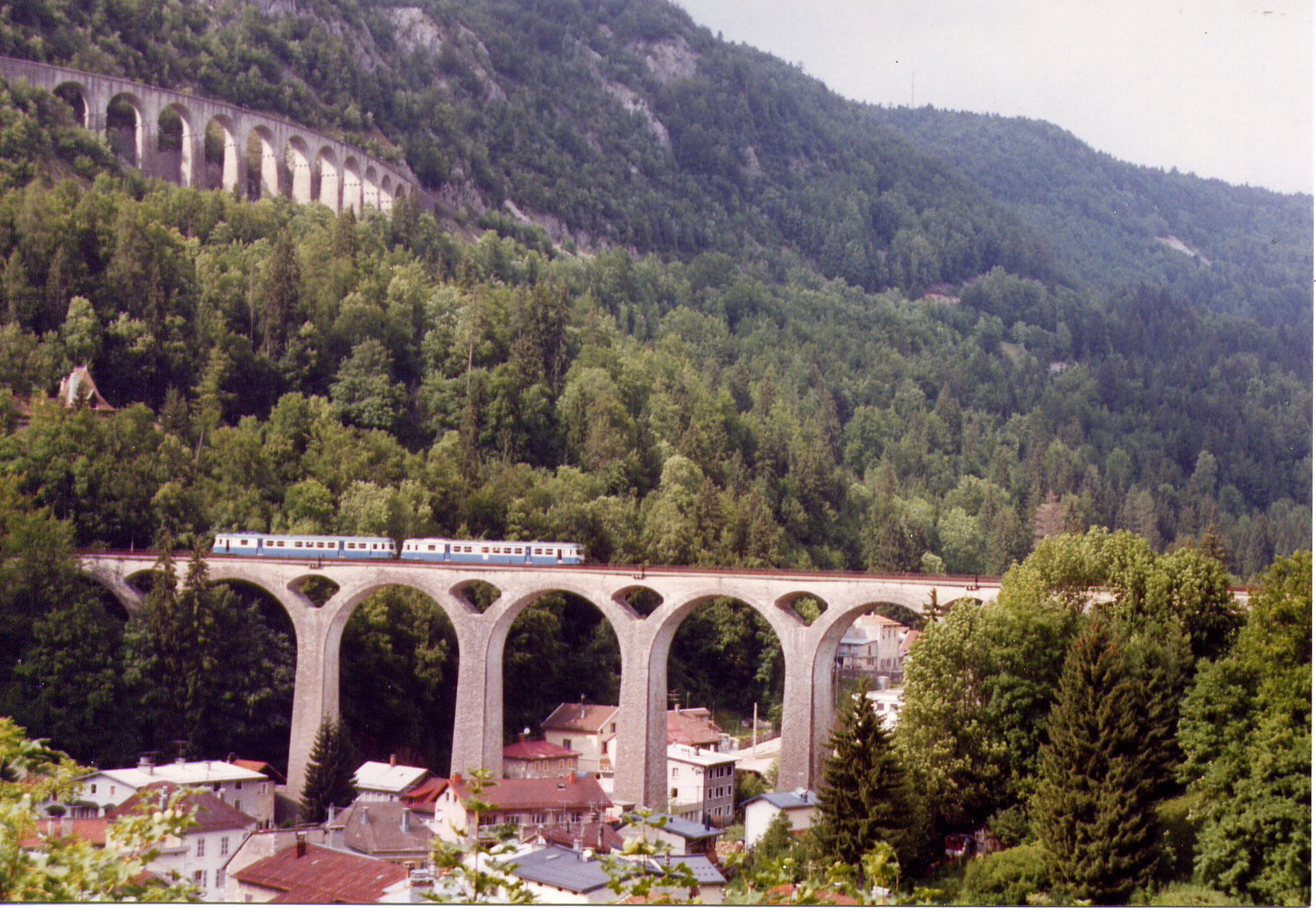

- Coat of arms
- Location of Morez
- Location within France Location within Bourgogne-Franche-Comté
- Coordinates: 46°31′22″N 6°01′23″E
- Country: France
- Region: Bourgogne-Franche-Comté
- Department: Jura
- Arrondissement: Saint-Claude
- Canton: Hauts de Bienne
- Commune: Hauts de Bienne
- Area^{1}: 9.67 km^{2} (3.73 sq mi)
- Highest elevation: 1,302 m (4,272 ft)
- Lowest elevation: 650 m (2,130 ft)
- Population (2022): 4,564
  - Density: 472/km^{2} (1,220/sq mi)
- Time zone: UTC+01:00 (CET)
  - Summer (DST): UTC+02:00 (CEST)
- Postal code: 39400
- ^{1} French Land Register data, which excludes lakes, ponds, glaciers > 1 km^{2} (0.386 sq mi or 247 acres) and river estuaries.

Morez (French pronunciation: [mɔʁe]) is a former commune of the Jura department in Bourgogne-Franche-Comté in eastern France. On 1 January 2016, it was merged into the new commune of Hauts de Bienne.

The town is mostly known for the manufacture of spectacles. From 1680 to 1920, Morez was with Morbier the center of Comtoise clock production.

== Population ==
Historical population

Year	Pop.	±% p.a.
1793	1,049	—
1800	1,218	+2.16%
1806	1,291	+0.97%
1821	1,694	+1.83%
1831	2,067	+2.01%
1836	2,508	+3.94%
1841	2,726	+1.68%
1846	3,183	+3.15%
1851	3,153	−0.19%
1856	3,851	+4.08%
1861	4,762	+4.34%
1866	5,458	+2.77%
1872	5,178	−0.87%
1876	5,419	+1.14%
1881	5,542	+0.45%
1886	5,443	−0.36%
1891	5,124	−1.20%
1896	5,333	+0.80%

Year	Pop.	±% p.a.
1901	5,449	+0.43%
1906	5,680	+0.83%
1911	5,928	+0.86%
1921	5,100	−1.49%
1926	5,136	+0.14%
1931	4,981	−0.61%
1936	4,892	−0.36%
1946	4,691	−0.42%
1954	5,588	+2.21%
1962	5,777	+0.42%
1968	6,408	+1.74%
1975	6,811	+0.88%
1982	6,739	−0.15%
1990	6,957	+0.40%
1999	6,144	−1.37%
2007	5,354	−1.71%
2012	4,982	−1.43%
2022	4,564	−0.87%

Source: EHESS and INSEE

== Gallery ==
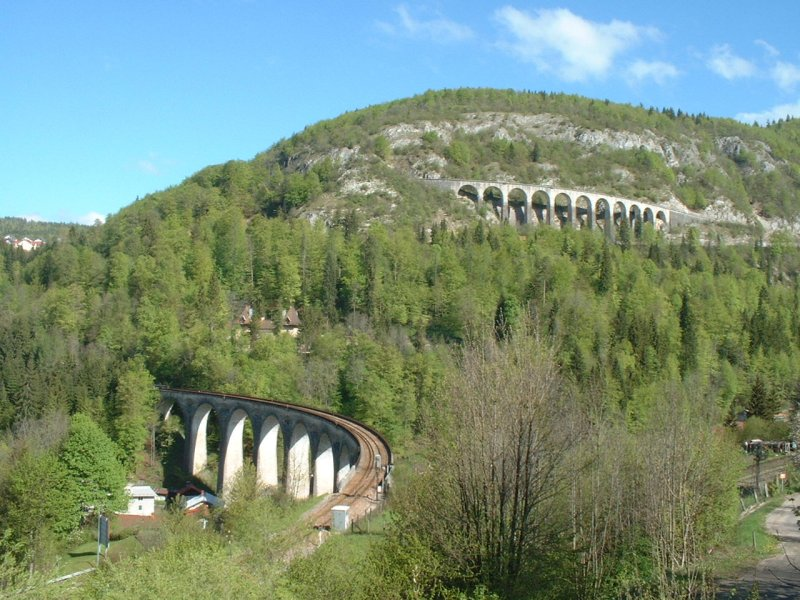
Train bridges over Morez

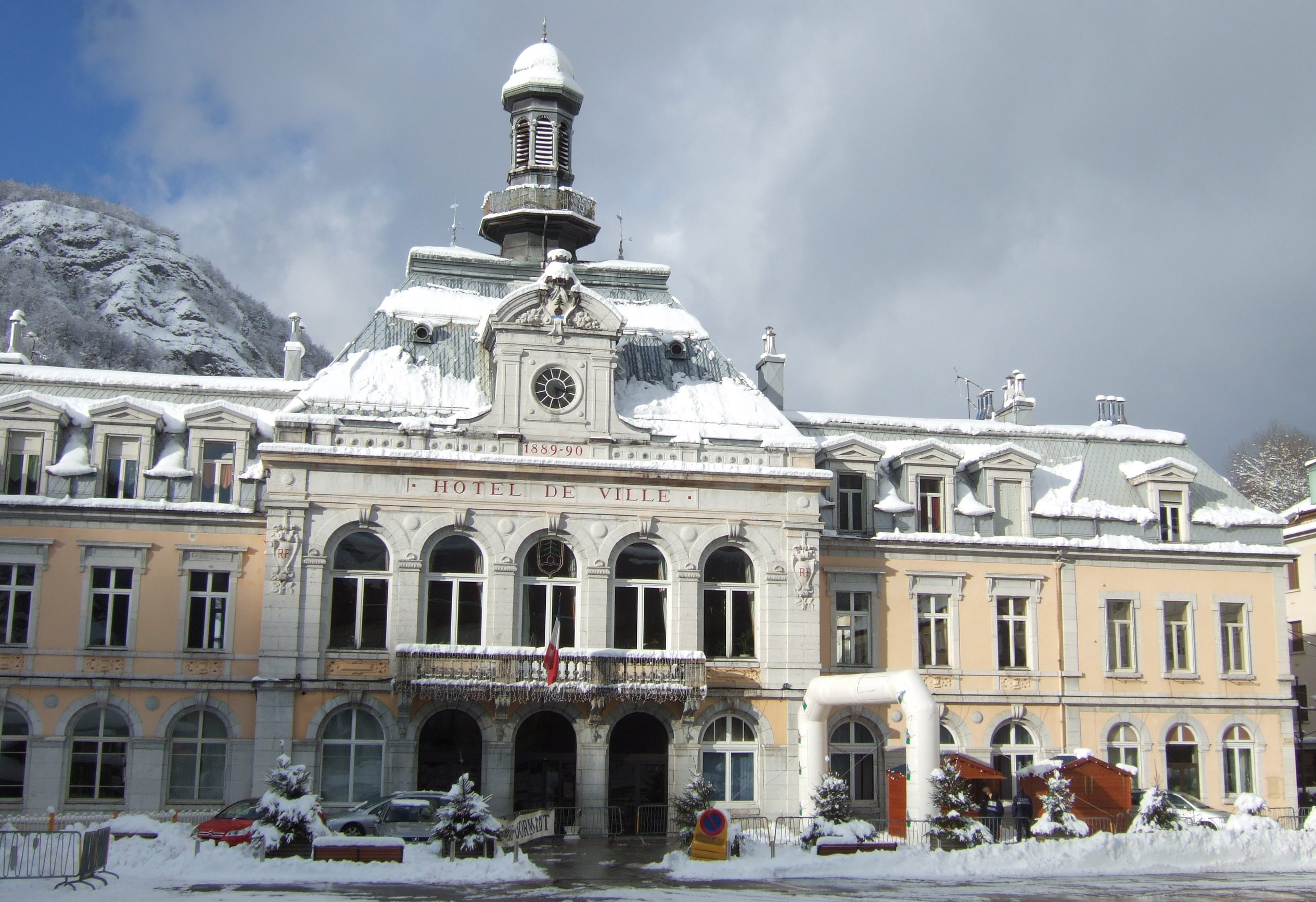
Town hall of Morez

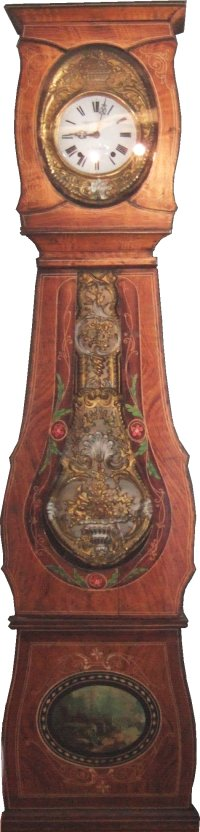
Comtoise clock

== See also ==
- Communes of the Jura department
