= Lac des Mortes =

Lake in France

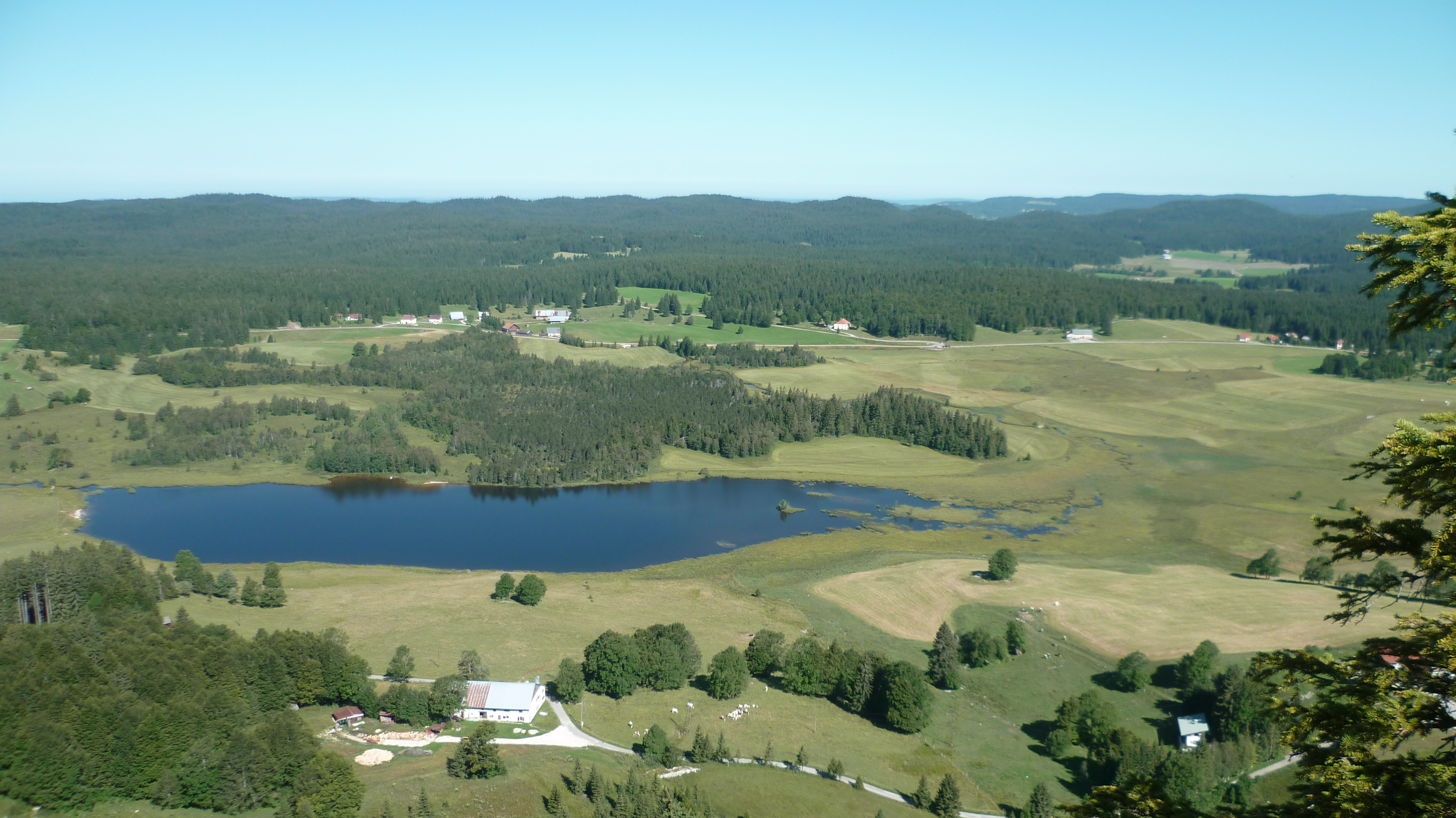

- Location within France
- Location: Doubs department
- Coordinates: 46°34′37″N 6°5′49″E
- Basin countries: France

Lac des Mortes is a lake in the Doubs department of France, a twin lake of Lac de Bellefontaine. The lakes are near Chapelle-des-Bois and Bellefontaine.
