= Le Douanier =

Canadian cheese

- Country of origin: Canada
- Region, town: Noyan, Quebec
- Source of milk: Cow
- Texture: semi-soft/creamy
- Fat content: 30%
- Protein content: 11g (per 50g)
- Aging time: ?
- Certification: -

Le Douanier is a wash-rinsed cheese made by Fritz Kaiser in Quebec, Canada. It is similar to a Morbier. Le Douanier won the 2004 Canadian Cheese Grand Prix. It also won a Gold award (entry class 5316, number 15) at World Cheese Awards 2015. It is a surface-ripened cheese, ivory in colour and has a little bit of a hazelnut flavour that comes out with age.

The wheel of cheese has an edible vegetable line running through its center. This symbolizes the Canada–US border that is very near the Fritz Kaiser fromagerie at which Le Douanier is made. The English translation of the cheese's French name, "Le Douanier", is "the customs officer".

== See also ==
- List of cheeses
