= Lac de Bellefontaine =

Lake in France

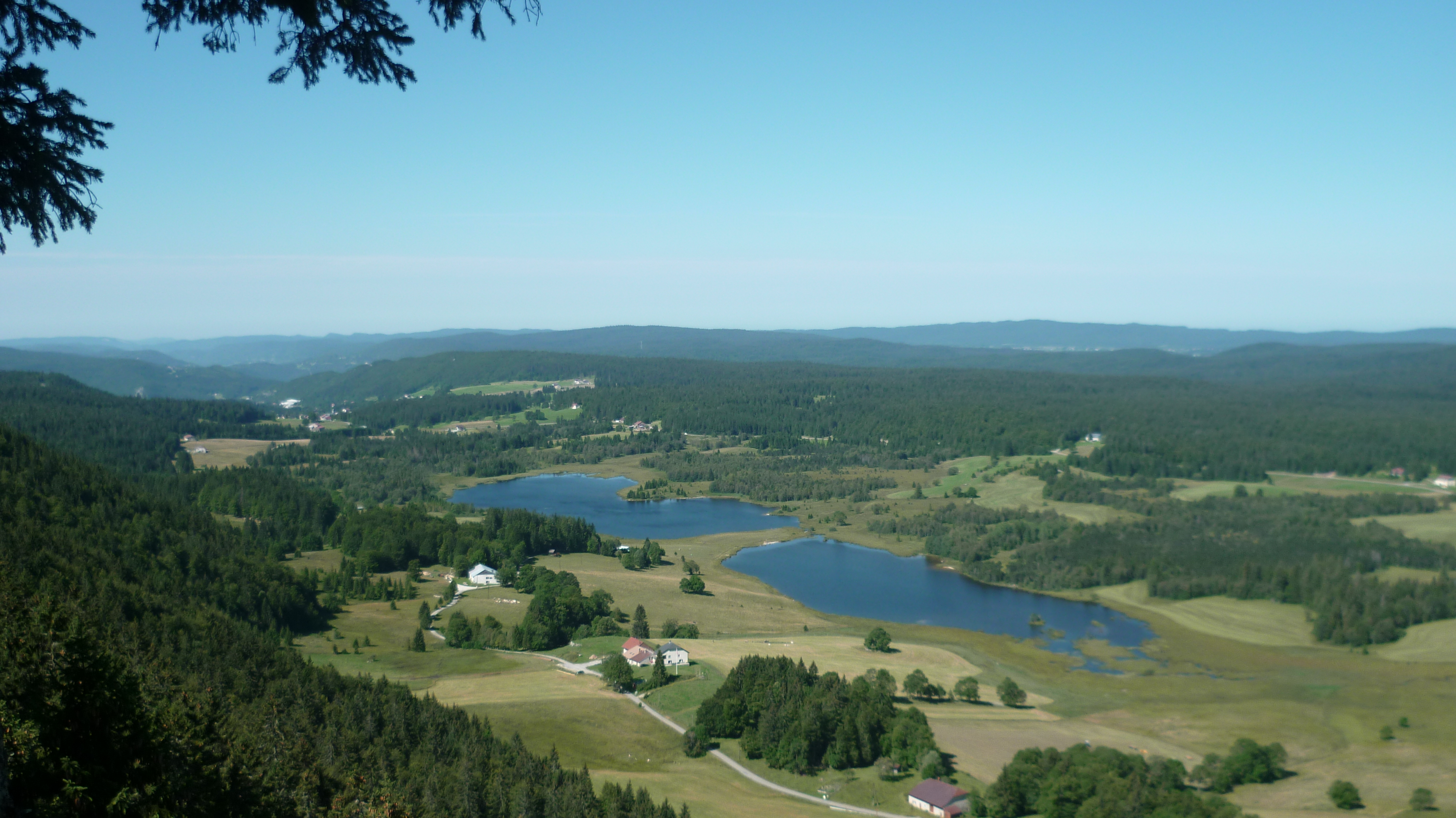

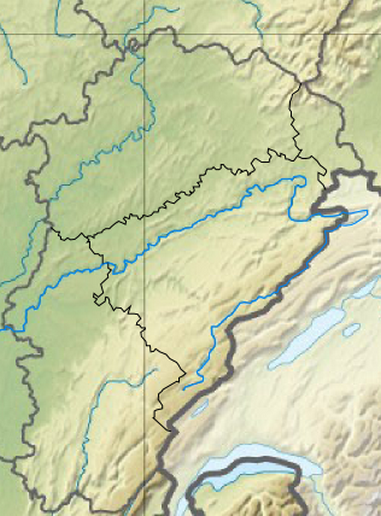
- Location within Franche-Comté
- Location: Bellefontaine, Jura department, Franche-Comté
- Coordinates: 46°34′25″N 6°5′32″E
- Basin countries: France

Lac de Bellefontaine is a lake at Bellefontaine in the Jura department of France. The lake is located close to Lac des Mortes.
