= La Mouille =

- Part of Hauts de Bienne
- Location of La Mouille
- Location within France Location within Bourgogne-Franche-Comté
- Coordinates: 46°30′10″N 5°58′45″E
- Country: France
- Region: Bourgogne-Franche-Comté
- Department: Jura
- Arrondissement: Saint-Claude
- Canton: Hauts de Bienne
- Commune: Hauts de Bienne
- Area^{1}: 8.06 km^{2} (3.11 sq mi)
- Highest elevation: 1,100 m (3,600 ft)
- Lowest elevation: 600 m (2,000 ft)
- Population (2023): 344
  - Density: 42.7/km^{2} (111/sq mi)
- Time zone: UTC+01:00 (CET)
  - Summer (DST): UTC+02:00 (CEST)
- Postal code: 39400
- ^{1} French Land Register data, which excludes lakes, ponds, glaciers > 1 km^{2} (0.386 sq mi or 247 acres) and river estuaries.

La Mouille (French pronunciation: [la muj]) is a former commune in the Jura department in Bourgogne-Franche-Comté in eastern France. On 1 January 2016, it was merged into the new commune of Hauts de Bienne.

== See also ==
- Communes of the Jura department
