= Hauts de Bienne =

Commune in Bourgogne-Franche-Comté, France

- Commune
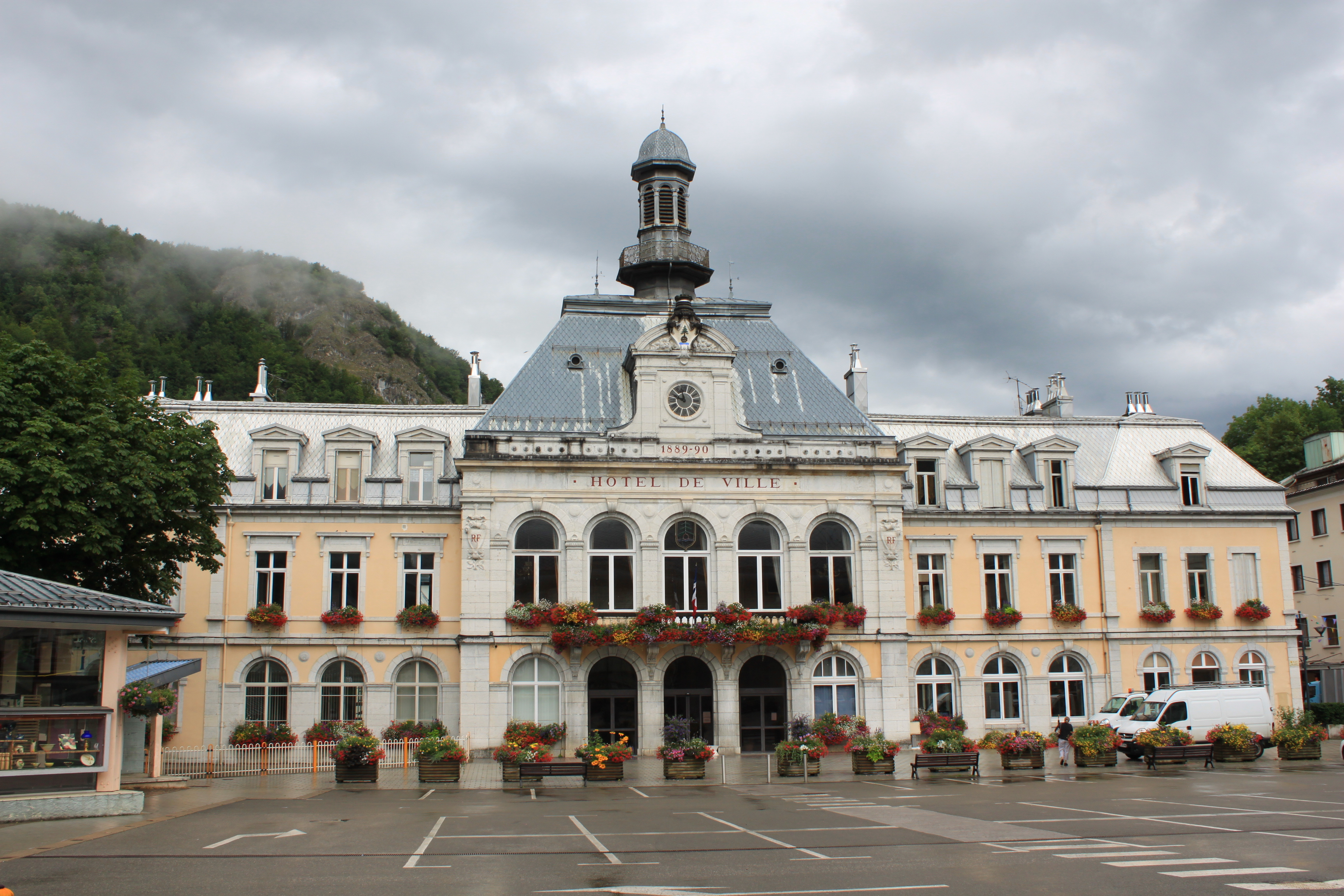
- The town hall in Morez
- Location of Hauts de Bienne
- Location within France Location within Bourgogne-Franche-Comté
- Coordinates: 46°31′16″N 6°01′23″E
- Country: France
- Region: Bourgogne-Franche-Comté
- Department: Jura
- Arrondissement: Saint-Claude
- Canton: Hauts de Bienne
- Intercommunality: CC Haut-Jura Arcade
- Area^{1}: 23.48 km^{2} (9.07 sq mi)
- Population (2023): 5,032
  - Density: 214.3/km^{2} (555.1/sq mi)
- Time zone: UTC+01:00 (CET)
  - Summer (DST): UTC+02:00 (CEST)
- INSEE/Postal code: 39368 /39400
- ^{1} French Land Register data, which excludes lakes, ponds, glaciers > 1 km^{2} (0.386 sq mi or 247 acres) and river estuaries.

Hauts de Bienne (French pronunciation: [o də bjɛn], lit. 'Heights of Bienne') is a commune in the Jura department of eastern France. The municipality was established on 1 January 2016 by merger of the former communes of Morez, Lézat and La Mouille. The commune was named after the river Bienne, that passes through it.

== Population ==
Population data refer to the commune in its geography as of January 2025.

Historical population
Year	Pop.	±% p.a.
1968	6,669	—
1975	7,072	+0.84%
1982	7,068	−0.01%
1990	7,354	+0.50%
1999	6,627	−1.15%
2007	5,833	−1.58%
2012	5,497	−1.18%
2017	5,350	−0.54%
2023	5,032	−1.02%
Source: INSEE

== See also ==
- Communes of the Jura department
