= Prémanon =

Commune in Bourgogne-Franche-Comté, France

- Commune
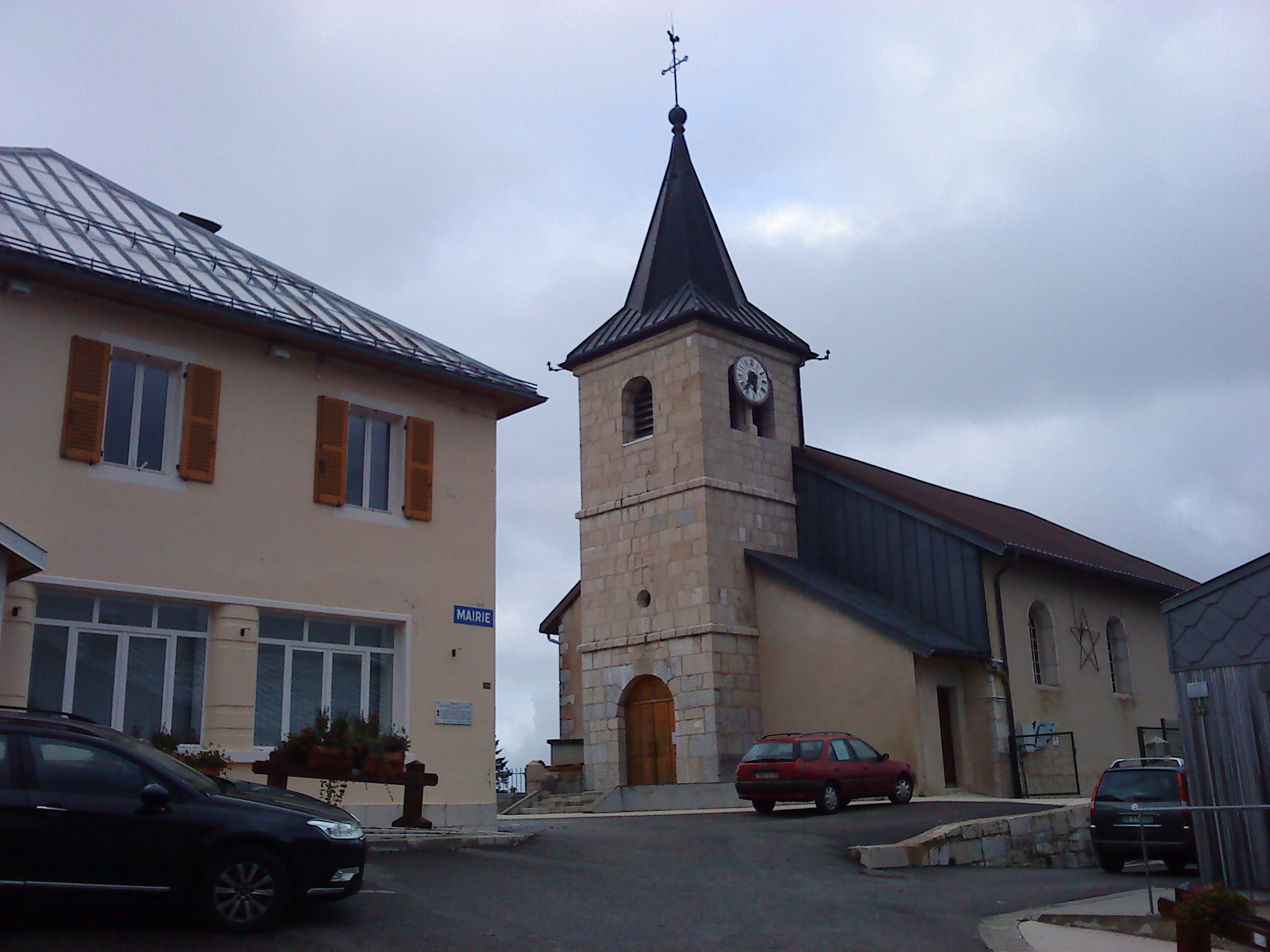
- Town hall and church

- Coat of arms
- Location of Prémanon
- Location within France Location within Bourgogne-Franche-Comté
- Coordinates: 46°27′46″N 6°01′56″E
- Country: France
- Region: Bourgogne-Franche-Comté
- Department: Jura
- Arrondissement: Saint-Claude
- Canton: Hauts de Bienne

Government
  - Mayor (2020–2026): Nolwenn Marchand
- Area^{1}: 28.18 km^{2} (10.88 sq mi)
- Highest elevation: 1,417 m (4,649 ft)
- Population (2023): 1,265
  - Density: 44.89/km^{2} (116.3/sq mi)
- Time zone: UTC+01:00 (CET)
  - Summer (DST): UTC+02:00 (CEST)
- INSEE/Postal code: 39441 /39220
- ^{1} French Land Register data, which excludes lakes, ponds, glaciers > 1 km^{2} (0.386 sq mi or 247 acres) and river estuaries.

Prémanon (French pronunciation: [pʁemanɔ̃]) is a commune in the Jura department in Bourgogne-Franche-Comté in eastern France.

== Population ==
Historical population
Year	Pop.	±% p.a.
1968	284	—
1975	315	+1.49%
1982	320	+0.23%
1990	606	+8.31%
1999	664	+1.02%
2007	968	+4.82%
2012	1,113	+2.83%
2017	1,188	+1.31%
2023	1,265	+1.05%
Source: INSEE

== See also ==
- Communes of the Jura department
