= Morbier =

Morbier may refer to:

- Morbier cheese
- Morbier, Jura
