= Morbier cheese =

Semi-soft French cheese

Morbier
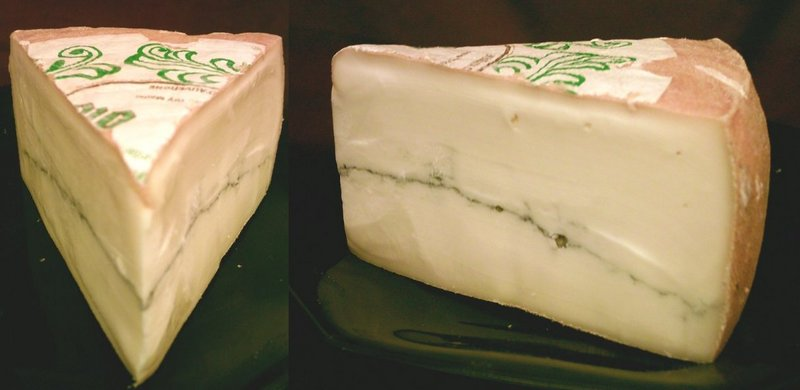
- Country of origin: France
- Region, town: Franche-Comté, Morbier
- Source of milk: Cows
- Pasteurized: Depends on variety
- Texture: Semi-soft
- Fat content: 45%
- Aging time: 45 days to 3 months
- Certification: Protected Designation of Origin, French AOC for both Morbier Jura and Morbier Doubs
- Named after: Morbier

Morbier (French pronunciation: [mɔʁbje]) is a semi-soft cows' milk cheese of France named after the small village of Morbier in Franche-Comté. It is ivory colored, soft and slightly elastic, and is immediately recognizable by the distinctive thin black layer separating it horizontally in the middle. It has a yellowish, sticky rind.

== Description ==
The aroma of Morbier cheese is mild, with a rich and creamy flavour. It has a semblance to Raclette cheese in consistency.

The Jura and Doubs versions both benefit from an appellation d'origine protégée (AOP), though other non-AOP Morbier exist on the market.

== Preparation ==
Traditionally, the cheese consists of a layer of evening milk curd and a layer of morning milk curd. When making Comté, cheesemakers would end the day with leftover curd that was not enough for an entire cheese. Thus, they would press the remaining evening curd into a mold, and spread ash over it to protect it overnight. The following morning, the cheese would be topped with morning milk curd. The layer of ash is left in place in between the layers of milk.

Today, it is typically prepared in factories and larger dairy cooperatives from one batch of milk, with the traditional ash line replaced by edible commercial vegetable ash.

== See also ==
- List of French cheeses
- List of cheeses
- Humboldt Fog, an American cheese with an ash line inspired by Morbier
