= Mouthe =

- Commune
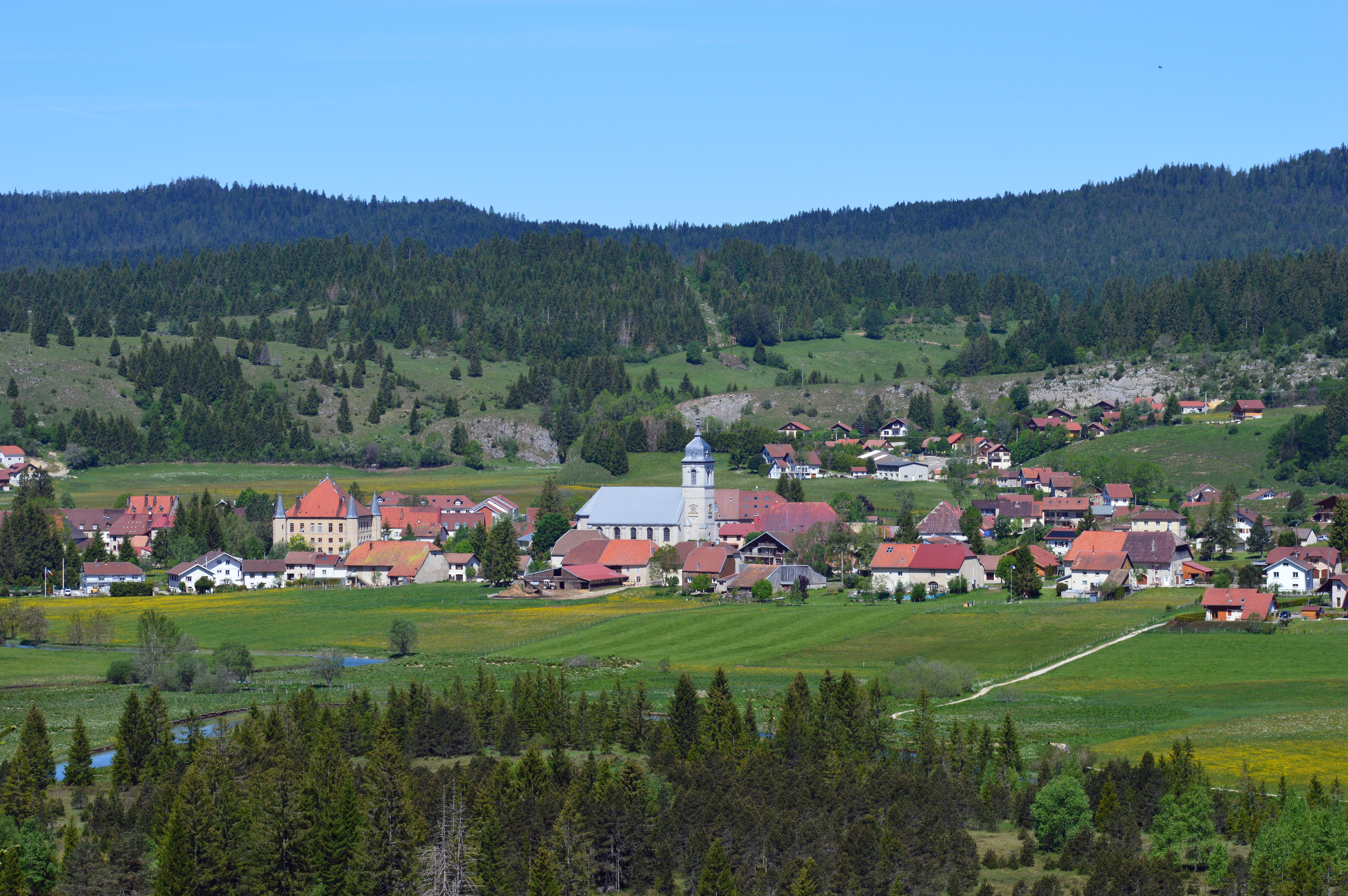
- A general view of Mouthe

- Coat of arms
- Location of Mouthe
- Location within France Location within Bourgogne-Franche-Comté
- Coordinates: 46°42′41″N 6°11′40″E
- Country: France
- Region: Bourgogne-Franche-Comté
- Department: Doubs
- Arrondissement: Pontarlier
- Canton: Frasne

Government
  - Mayor (2020–2026): Daniel Perrin
- Area^{1}: 38.73 km^{2} (14.95 sq mi)
- Highest elevation: 1,414 m (4,639 ft)
- Lowest elevation: 926 m (3,038 ft)
- Population (2023): 1,037
  - Density: 26.78/km^{2} (69.35/sq mi)
- Time zone: UTC+01:00 (CET)
  - Summer (DST): UTC+02:00 (CEST)
- INSEE/Postal code: 25413 /25240
- ^{1} French Land Register data, which excludes lakes, ponds, glaciers > 1 km^{2} (0.386 sq mi or 247 acres) and river estuaries.

Mouthe (French pronunciation: [mut]; Arpitan: Meutiou) is a commune in the Doubs department in the Bourgogne-Franche-Comté region in eastern France. The town is known for having the coldest recorded temperature in France.

== Geography ==
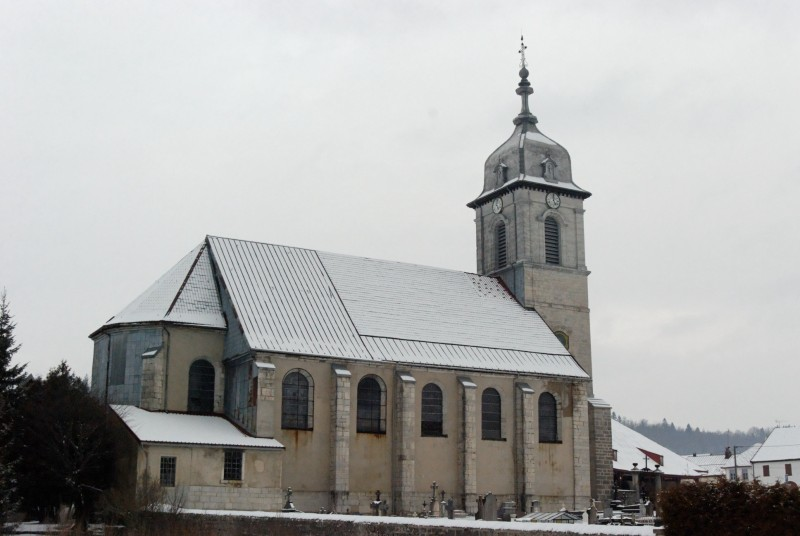
Church of the Assumption of Mouthe (1732–1749), designed by J.-P. Galezot

The town is located 30 km (19 mi) south of Pontarlier in the Jura Mountains on the Swiss border. The source of the river Doubs is 2 km (1.2 mi) from Mouthe.

=== Climate ===
Mouthe, is located in a region of the Jura Mountains known as "Little Siberia" (La Petite Sibérie) and snowfalls are not uncommon as late as the third week of March. Although the average low temperature for January in the town ranges from about -6 °C to -10 °C, the low temperature descended to -36.7 °C (-34.1 °F) on 13 January 1968, and fell further, to -41.2 °C (-42.2 °F) on 17 January 1985.

Due to its elevation and its location in a combe, the diurnal temperature variation is high and Mouthe features a warm-summer humid continental climate (Dfb, according to the Köppen climate classification), with an average annual precipitation of 1,712.9 mm (67.44 in).

Summers are warm and winters are very cold and snowy and there is no dry season.

Climate data for Mouthe, elevation: 940 m (3,084 ft), 1991–2020 normals, extremes 1880–present
Month	Jan	Feb	Mar	Apr	May	Jun	Jul	Aug	Sep	Oct	Nov	Dec	Year
Record high °C (°F)	20.0 (68.0)	21.5 (70.7)	25.0 (77.0)	28.0 (82.4)	31.0 (87.8)	35.5 (95.9)	36.0 (96.8)	35.5 (95.9)	35.0 (95.0)	28.0 (82.4)	26.0 (78.8)	19.5 (67.1)	36.0 (96.8)
Mean daily maximum °C (°F)	3.2 (37.8)	4.4 (39.9)	8.3 (46.9)	12.1 (53.8)	16.2 (61.2)	20.0 (68.0)	22.2 (72.0)	22.0 (71.6)	17.8 (64.0)	13.7 (56.7)	7.4 (45.3)	3.6 (38.5)	12.6 (54.6)
Daily mean °C (°F)	−1.5 (29.3)	−0.8 (30.6)	2.7 (36.9)	6.0 (42.8)	10.1 (50.2)	13.6 (56.5)	15.5 (59.9)	15.2 (59.4)	11.6 (52.9)	8.0 (46.4)	2.7 (36.9)	−0.7 (30.7)	6.9 (44.4)
Mean daily minimum °C (°F)	−6.1 (21.0)	−6.1 (21.0)	−2.9 (26.8)	−0.1 (31.8)	4.0 (39.2)	7.1 (44.8)	8.9 (48.0)	8.4 (47.1)	5.3 (41.5)	2.3 (36.1)	−2.0 (28.4)	−5.0 (23.0)	1.2 (34.1)
Record low °C (°F)	−41.2 (−42.2)	−31.1 (−24.0)	−31.6 (−24.9)	−20.5 (−4.9)	−9.8 (14.4)	−6.5 (20.3)	−4.0 (24.8)	−4.5 (23.9)	−8.0 (17.6)	−14.3 (6.3)	−29.6 (−21.3)	−32.8 (−27.0)	−41.2 (−42.2)
Average precipitation mm (inches)	150.9 (5.94)	131.3 (5.17)	131.6 (5.18)	117.6 (4.63)	141.8 (5.58)	135.9 (5.35)	130.3 (5.13)	128.8 (5.07)	119.2 (4.69)	147.1 (5.79)	157.8 (6.21)	185.1 (7.29)	1,677.4 (66.03)
Average precipitation days (≥ 1.0 mm)	13.2	12.5	11.7	12.2	14.5	12.1	11.8	11.4	10.5	13.0	13.3	14.5	150.7
Source: Meteo France

=== 1981-2010 climate normals ===
Climate data for Mouthe, elevation: 940 m (3,084 ft), 1981–2010 normals, extremes 1880–present
Month	Jan	Feb	Mar	Apr	May	Jun	Jul	Aug	Sep	Oct	Nov	Dec	Year
Record high °C (°F)	20.0 (68.0)	21.0 (69.8)	25.0 (77.0)	28.0 (82.4)	31.0 (87.8)	33.5 (92.3)	36.0 (96.8)	35.5 (95.9)	35.0 (95.0)	28.0 (82.4)	26.0 (78.8)	19.5 (67.1)	36.0 (96.8)
Mean daily maximum °C (°F)	3.5 (38.3)	4.5 (40.1)	7.7 (45.9)	10.7 (51.3)	15.7 (60.3)	18.6 (65.5)	21.8 (71.2)	21.8 (71.2)	17.7 (63.9)	13.9 (57.0)	7.5 (45.5)	4.4 (39.9)	12.3 (54.1)
Daily mean °C (°F)	−1.8 (28.8)	−0.9 (30.4)	2.2 (36.0)	5.1 (41.2)	9.8 (49.6)	12.6 (54.7)	15.4 (59.7)	15.1 (59.2)	11.6 (52.9)	8.2 (46.8)	2.4 (36.3)	−0.1 (31.8)	6.6 (43.9)
Mean daily minimum °C (°F)	−7.0 (19.4)	−6.3 (20.7)	−3.2 (26.2)	−0.4 (31.3)	3.8 (38.8)	6.6 (43.9)	9.0 (48.2)	8.4 (47.1)	5.5 (41.9)	2.4 (36.3)	−2.8 (27.0)	−4.7 (23.5)	0.9 (33.6)
Record low °C (°F)	−41.2 (−42.2)	−31.1 (−24.0)	−31.6 (−24.9)	−20.5 (−4.9)	−9.8 (14.4)	−6.5 (20.3)	−4.0 (24.8)	−4.5 (23.9)	−7.1 (19.2)	−14.3 (6.3)	−29.6 (−21.3)	−32.8 (−27.0)	−41.2 (−42.2)
Average precipitation mm (inches)	154.0 (6.06)	137.6 (5.42)	140.1 (5.52)	123.8 (4.87)	146.3 (5.76)	141.3 (5.56)	118.0 (4.65)	129.6 (5.10)	135.8 (5.35)	156.4 (6.16)	155.9 (6.14)	174.1 (6.85)	1,712.9 (67.44)
Average precipitation days (≥ 1.0 mm)	13.5	12.5	12.9	12.8	15.3	12.1	11.1	11.5	10.2	13.1	13.2	14.0	152.2
Source: Infoclimat

The village and its church served as the location for the film Nobody Else But You (2011).

== Population ==
Historical population
Year	Pop.	±% p.a.
1968	760	—
1975	811	+0.93%
1982	813	+0.04%
1990	898	+1.25%
1999	891	−0.09%
2007	975	+1.13%
2012	954	−0.43%
2017	1,098	+2.85%
2023	1,037	−0.95%
Source: INSEE

== See also ==
- Communes of the Doubs department
