= Bois-d'Amont =

Commune in Bourgogne-Franche-Comté, France

- Commune
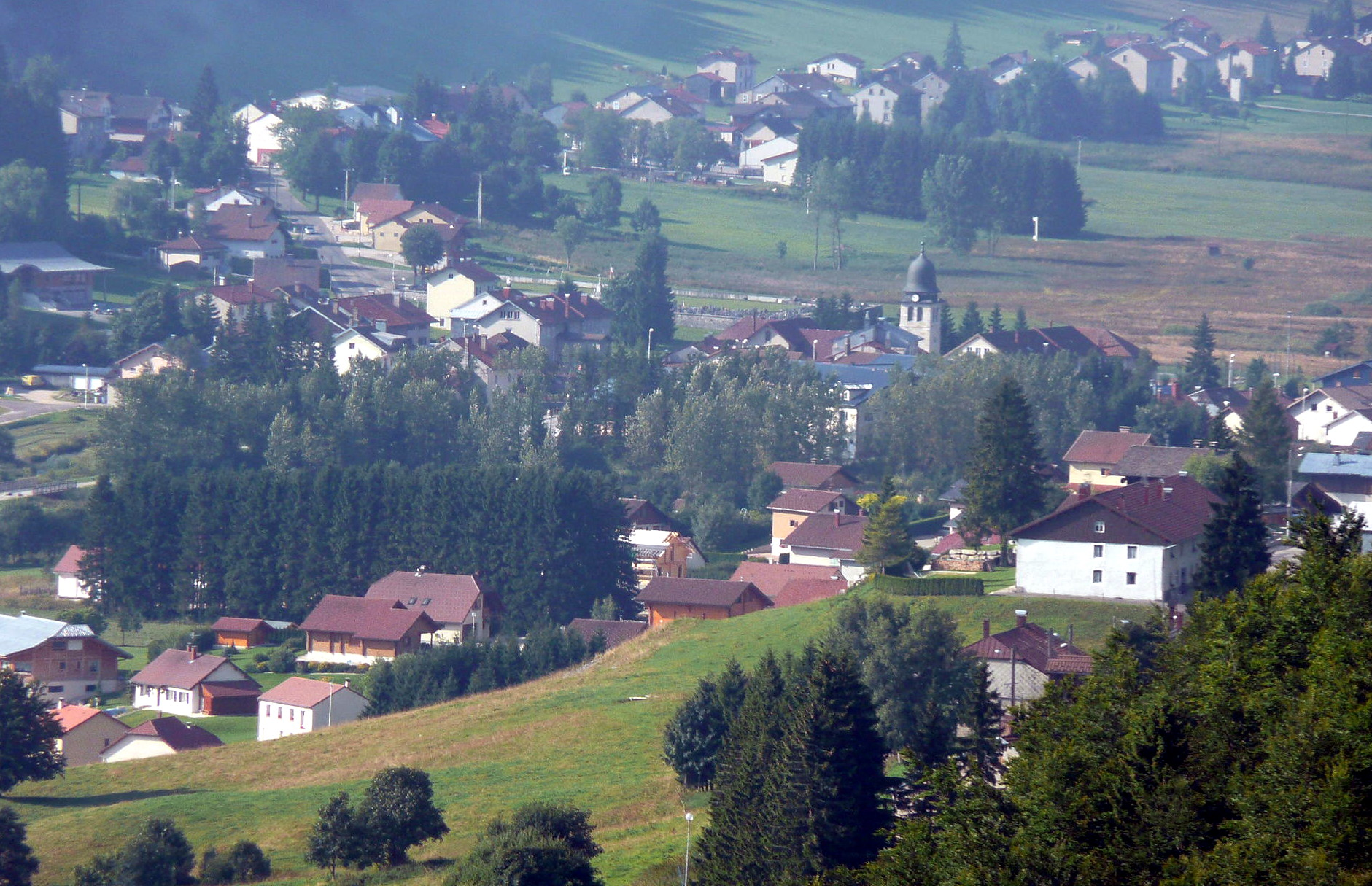
- A general view of Bois-d'Amont

- Coat of arms
- Location of Bois-d'Amont
- Location within France Location within Bourgogne-Franche-Comté
- Coordinates: 46°32′11″N 6°08′23″E
- Country: France
- Region: Bourgogne-Franche-Comté
- Department: Jura
- Arrondissement: Saint-Claude
- Canton: Hauts de Bienne

Government
  - Mayor (2020–2026): Michel Puillet
- Area^{1}: 12.06 km^{2} (4.66 sq mi)
- Highest elevation: 1,310 m (4,300 ft)
- Lowest elevation: 1,042 m (3,419 ft)
- Population (2023): 1,738
  - Density: 144.1/km^{2} (373.3/sq mi)
- Time zone: UTC+01:00 (CET)
  - Summer (DST): UTC+02:00 (CEST)
- INSEE/Postal code: 39059 /39220
- ^{1} French Land Register data, which excludes lakes, ponds, glaciers > 1 km^{2} (0.386 sq mi or 247 acres) and river estuaries.

Bois-d'Amont (French pronunciation: [bwa damɔ̃]) is a commune in the Jura department in Bourgogne-Franche-Comté in eastern France.

== Population ==
Historical population
Year	Pop.	±% p.a.
1968	1,258	—
1975	1,254	−0.05%
1982	1,255	+0.01%
1990	1,350	+0.92%
1999	1,517	+1.30%
2007	1,637	+0.96%
2012	1,661	+0.29%
2017	1,655	−0.07%
2023	1,738	+0.82%
Source: INSEE

== See also ==
- Communes of the Jura department
