= Bellefontaine, Jura =

Commune in Bourgogne-Franche-Comté, France

Bellefontaine
- Commune
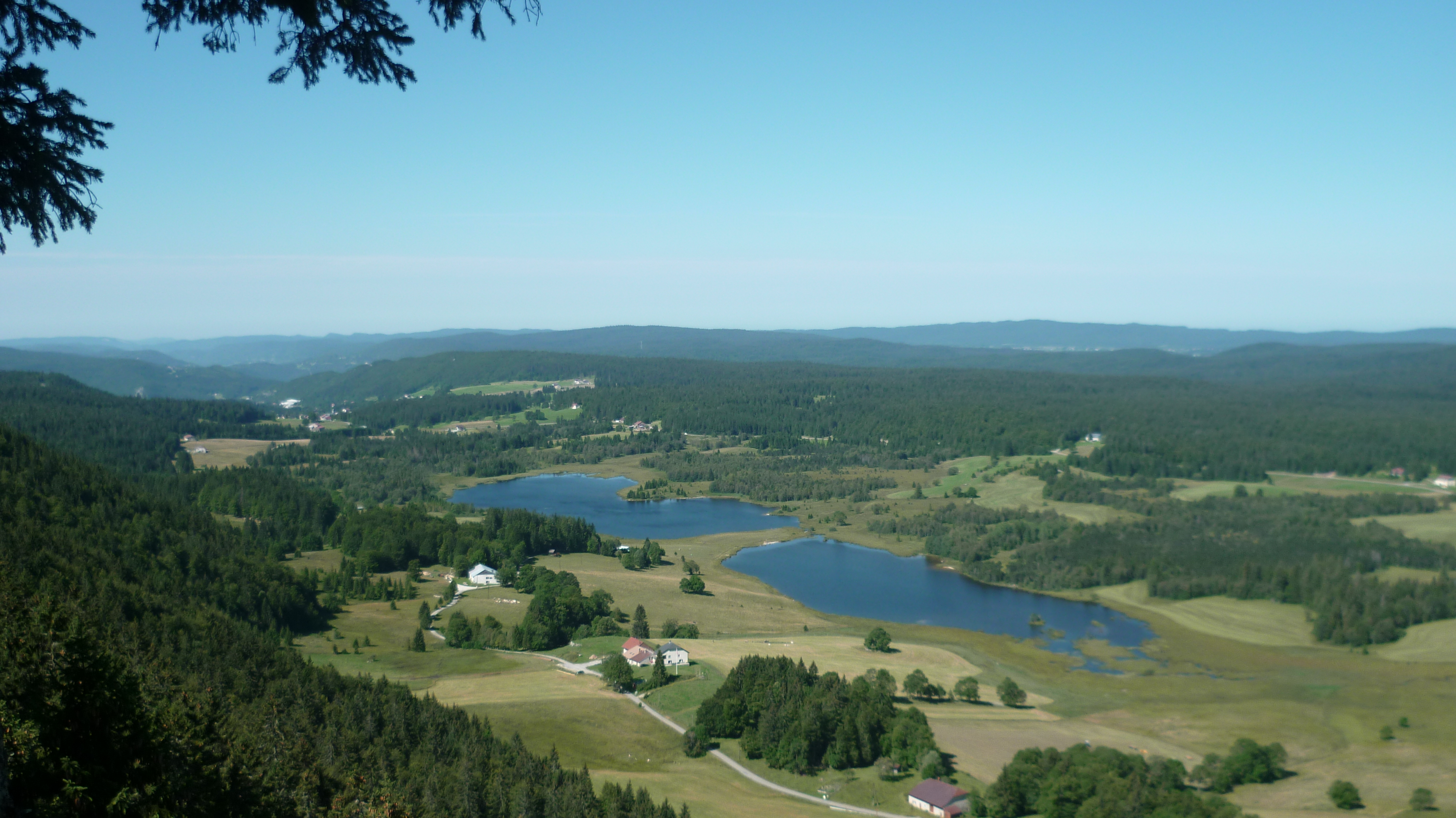
- The Bellefontaine lake (left) and the Mortes lake (right)

- Coat of arms
- Location of Bellefontaine
- Location within France Location within Bourgogne-Franche-Comté
- Coordinates: 46°33′28″N 6°03′58″E
- Country: France
- Region: Bourgogne-Franche-Comté
- Department: Jura
- Arrondissement: Saint-Claude
- Canton: Hauts de Bienne
- Intercommunality: CC Haut-Jura Arcade

Government
  - Mayor (2020–2026): Martine Guyon
- Area^{1}: 24.71 km^{2} (9.54 sq mi)
- Highest elevation: 1,302 m (4,272 ft)
- Lowest elevation: 760 m (2,490 ft)
- Population (2023): 494
  - Density: 20.0/km^{2} (51.8/sq mi)
- Time zone: UTC+01:00 (CET)
  - Summer (DST): UTC+02:00 (CEST)
- INSEE/Postal code: 39047 /39400
- ^{1} French Land Register data, which excludes lakes, ponds, glaciers > 1 km^{2} (0.386 sq mi or 247 acres) and river estuaries.

Bellefontaine (French pronunciation: [bɛlfɔ̃tɛn]) is a commune in the Jura department in the region of Bourgogne-Franche-Comté in eastern France.

== Population ==
Historical population
Year	Pop.	±% p.a.
1968	227	—
1975	255	+1.68%
1982	314	+3.02%
1990	422	+3.76%
1999	453	+0.79%
2007	540	+2.22%
2012	536	−0.15%
2017	537	+0.04%
2023	494	−1.38%
Source: INSEE

== See also ==
- Communes of the Jura department
