= Canton of Hauts de Bienne =

Coordinates: 46°30′25″N 6°01′14″E

Hauts de Bienne
- Canton
- Interactive map of Hauts de Bienne
- Country: France
- Region: Bourgogne-Franche-Comté
- Department: Jura
- No. of communes: {{{nbcomm}}}

Government
  - Representatives (2021–2028): Maryvonne Cretin-Maitenaz and Sébastien Benoit-Guyod
- Area: 225.61 km^{2} (87.11 sq mi)
- Population (2023): 15,864
  - Density: 70.316/km^{2} (182.12/sq mi)
- INSEE code: 39 11

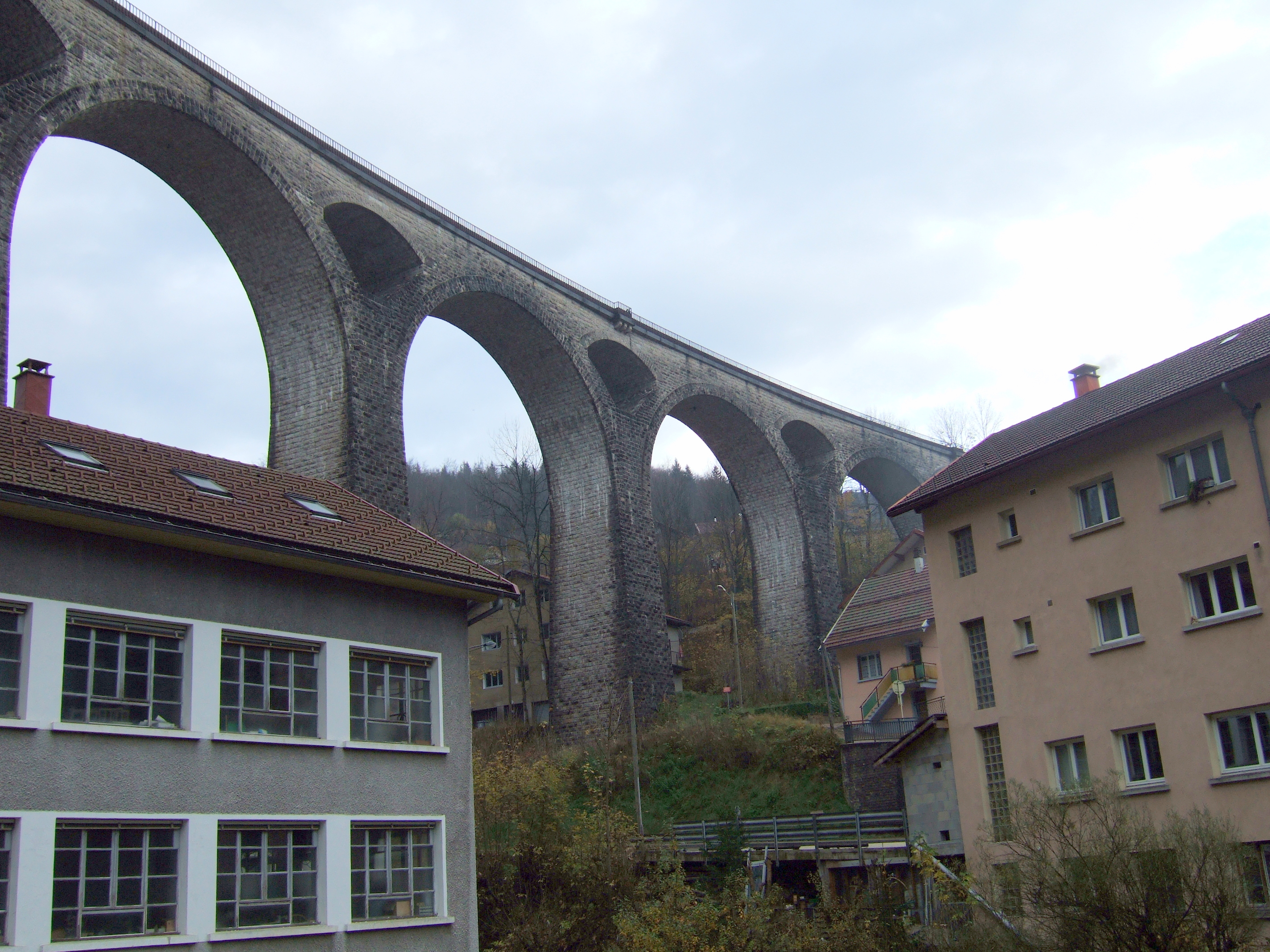
This railway bridge is the primary landmark of the town of Morez, the main town of the canton of the same name

Hauts de Bienne (before 2021: Morez) is a canton in the département of Jura, France. It belongs to the Arrondissement of Saint-Claude.

Since the French canton reorganisation which came into effect in March 2015, the communes of the canton of Hauts de Bienne are:

- Bellefontaine
- Bois-d'Amont
- Hauts de Bienne
- Longchaumois
- Morbier
- Prémanon
- Les Rousses
