= Nordic combined at the 2006 Winter Olympics – Individual Gundersen =

Individual Gundersen at the XX Olympic Winter Games
- Pictogram for Nordic combined
- Venue: Pragelato
- Dates: February 11, 2006
- Competitors: 50 from 15 nations
- Winning time: 39:44.6

Medalists
1st place, gold medalist(s)		Georg Hettich	Germany
2nd place, silver medalist(s)		Felix Gottwald	Austria
3rd place, bronze medalist(s)		Magnus Moan	Norway

The Men's individual Gundersen Nordic combined competition for the 2006 Winter Olympics was held in Pragelato, Italy. It took place on 11 February.

== Results ==
=== Ski Jumping ===
Fifty athletes entered the ski jumping portion of the sprint; each made two jumps, which was judged in the same fashion as the Olympic ski jumping competition. The combined scores from these two jumps were used to calculate the deficit with which each athlete began the cross-country portion of the event. Each point behind the leading score of Georg Hettich was equivalent to four seconds of time deficit.

Rank	Name	Country	Score	Deficit	Notes
1	Georg Hettich	Germany	262.5	0:00	
2	Petter Tande	Norway	262.0	+0:02	
3	Jason Lamy Chappuis	France	257.0	+0:22	
3	Jaakko Tallus	Finland	257.0	+0:22	
5	Christoph Bieler	Austria	251.0	+0:46	
5	Sergej Maslennikov	Russia	251.0	+0:46	
7	Michael Gruber	Austria	248.5	+0:56	
8	Hannu Manninen	Finland	238.0	+1:38	
9	Magnus Moan	Norway	237.5	+1:40	
10	Yosuke Hatakeyama	Japan	235.0	+1:50	
11	Felix Gottwald	Austria	234.5	+1:52	
12	Daito Takahashi	Japan	233.5	+1:56	
13	Todd Lodwick	United States	232.0	+2:02	
14	Ivan Rieder	Switzerland	230.0	+2:10	
15	Havard Klemetsen	Norway	229.0	+2:14	
16	Björn Kircheisen	Germany	224.0	+2:34	
17	Mario Stecher	Austria	223.0	+2:38	
18	Anssi Koivuranta	Finland	220.5	+2:48	
19	Bill Demong	United States	220.0	+2:50	
19	Johnny Spillane	United States	220.0	+2:50	
21	Giuseppe Michielli	Italy	219.5	+2:52	
22	Antti Kuisma	Finland	217.5	+3:00	
23	Norihito Kobayashi	Japan	217.0	+3:02	
23	Damjan Vtic	Slovenia	217.0	+3:02	
25	Ivan Fesenko	Russia	215.0	+3:10	
26	Ronny Ackermann	Germany	213.5	+3:16	
26	Ronny Heer	Switzerland	213.5	+3:16	
28	Sebastian Haseney	Germany	212.5	+3:20	
29	Ludovic Roux	France	211.5	+3:24	
30	Seppi Hurschler	Switzerland	211.0	+3:26	
31	Pavel Churavy	Czech Republic	210.0	+3:30	
32	Jason Myslicki	Canada	207.5	+3:40	
33	Brett Camerota	United States	203.5	+3:56	
34	Ladislav Rygl	Czech Republic	198.0	+4:18	
35	Tomas Slavik	Czech Republic	196.5	+4:24	
35	Daniele Munari	Italy	196.5	+4:24	
37	Francois Braud	France	194.0	+4:34	
37	Alexsej Barannikov	Russia	194.0	+4:34	
39	Andreas Hurschler	Switzerland	193.5	+4:36	
40	Takashi Kitamura	Japan	192.5	+4:40	
41	Jochen Strobl	Italy	190.5	+4:48	
42	Nicolas Bal	France	188.5	+4:56	
42	Tambet Pikkor	Estonia	188.5	+4:56	
44	Kristian Hammer	Norway	183.0	+5:18	
45	Patrik Chlum	Czech Republic	182.5	+5:20	
46	Max Thompson	Canada	171.5	+6:04	
47	Alessandro Pittin	Italy	161.5	+6:44	
48	Sergei Diyachuk	Ukraine	151.0	+7:26	
49	Volodymyr Trachuk	Ukraine	140.0	+8:10	
-	Dimitry Matveev	Russia	DNF	-	

=== Cross-Country ===
The start for the 15 kilometre race was staggered, with a one-point deficit in the ski jump portion resulting in a four second deficit in starting the cross-country course. This stagger meant that the first athlete across the finish line, Georg Hettich, was the overall winner of the event. Silver medallist Felix Gottwald of Austria and bronze medallist Magnus Moan of Norway both managed to beat Hettich by more than a minute in the cross-country leg, but with eleventh and ninth place respectively in the ski jumping leg, their cross-country skiing was not enough to take them to the very top of the podium. Moan beat compatriot Petter Tande in a dash for the finish line, while Finn Jaakko Tallus is a further second behind.

Rank	Name	Country	Deficit	Cross-Country Time	Total	Notes
Gold medal	Georg Hettich	Germany	+0:00	39:44.6	39:44.6	
Silver medal	Felix Gottwald	Austria	+1:52	38:02.4	+0:09.8	
Bronze medal	Magnus Moan	Norway	+1:40	38:20.8	+0:16.2	
4	Petter Tande	Norway	+0:02	39:58.9	+0:16.3	
5	Jaakko Tallus	Finland	+0:22	39:39.9	+0:17.3	
6	Sebastian Haseney	Germany	+3:20	37:15.7	+0:51.1	
7	Björn Kircheisen	Germany	+2:34	38:21.1	+1:10.5	
8	Todd Lodwick	United States	+2:02	38:54.6	+1:12.0	
9	Hannu Manninen	Finland	+1:38	39:42.2	+1:35.6	
10	Sergej Maslennikov	Russia	+0:46	40:44.2	+1:45.6	
11	Jason Lamy Chappuis	France	+0:22	41:12.0	+1:49.4	
12	Michael Gruber	Austria	+0:56	40:51.9	+2:03.3	
13	Christoph Bieler	Austria	+0:46	41:05.3	+2:06.7	
14	Giuseppe Michielli	Italy	+2:52	39:13.5	+2:20.9	
15	Bill Demong	United States	+2:50	39:18.5	+2:23.9	
16	Norihito Kobayashi	Japan	+3:02	39:21.1	+2:38.5	
17	Antti Kuisma	Finland	+3:00	39:33.8	+2:49.2	
18	Ronny Ackermann	Germany	+3:16	39:42.9	+3:14.3	
19	Mario Stecher	Austria	+2:38	40:21.2	+3:14.6	
20	Havard Klemetsen	Norway	+2:14	40:46.5	+3:15.9	
21	Pavel Churavy	Czech Republic	+3:30	39:44.2	+3:29.6	
22	Seppi Hurschler	Switzerland	+3:26	39:52.4	+3:33.8	
23	Andreas Hurschler	Switzerland	+4:36	38:45.9	+3:37.3	
24	Ronny Heer	Switzerland	+3:16	40:11.0	+3:42.4	
25	Anssi Koivuranta	Finland	+2:48	40:49.3	+3:52.7	
26	Ludovic Roux	France	+3:24	40:18.6	+3:58.0	
27	Ivan Rieder	Switzerland	+2:10	41:48.6	+4:14.0	
28	Ivan Fesenko	Russia	+3:10	40:51.3	+4:16.7	
29	Alexsej Barannikov	Russia	+4:34	39:46.3	+4:35.7	
30	Johnny Spillane	United States	+2:50	41:37.6	+4:43.0	
31	Nicolas Bal	France	+4:56	39:32.9	+4:44.3	
32	Yosuke Hatakeyama	Japan	+1:50	42:39.8	+4:45.2	
33	Tambet Pikkor	Estonia	+4:56	39:43.9	+4:55.3	
34	Jochen Strobl	Italy	+4:48	39:54.3	+4:57.7	
35	Kristian Hammer	Norway	+5:18	39:32.8	+5:06.2	
36	Ladislav Rygl	Czech Republic	+4:18	40:40.7	+5:14.1	
37	Tomas Slavik	Czech Republic	+4:24	40:35.4	+5:14.8	
38	Brett Camerota	United States	+3:56	41:03.6	+5:15.0	
39	Daniele Munari	Italy	+4:24	40:42.3	+5:21.7	
40	Damjan Vtic	Slovenia	+3:02	42:34.9	+5:52.3	
41	Jason Myslicki	Canada	+3:40	42:41.0	+6:36.4	
42	Francois Braud	France	+4:34	42:28.3	+7:17.7	
43	Takashi Kitamura	Japan	+4:40	42:37.3	+7:32.7	
44	Max Thompson	Canada	+6:04	41:58.3	+8:13.2	
45	Sergei Diyachuk	Ukraine	+7:26	40:42.1	+8:23.5	
46	Alessandro Pittin	Italy	+6:44	42:06.2	+9:05.6	
47	Patrik Chlum	Czech Republic	+5:20	44:43.9	+10:19.3	
48	Volodymyr Trachuk	Ukraine	+8:10	43:45.2	+12:10.6	
-	Daito Takahashi	Japan	+1:56	Did not start		

1: The bronze medal was determined by a photo finish, with Moan just edging Tande for third place.
