= Nordic combined at the 2006 Winter Olympics – Sprint =

Men's sprint at the XX Olympic Winter Games
- Pictogram for Nordic combined
- Venue: Pragelato
- Dates: February 21, 2006
- Competitors: 49 from 15 nations
- Winning time: 18:38.6

Medalists
1st place, gold medalist(s)		Felix Gottwald	Austria
2nd place, silver medalist(s)		Magnus Moan	Norway
3rd place, bronze medalist(s)		Georg Hettich	Germany

The Men's sprint Nordic combined competition for the 2006 Winter Olympics was held in Pragelato, Italy. It took place on 21 February.

== Results ==
=== Ski Jumping ===
Forty-nine athletes entered the ski jumping portion of the sprint; each made one jump, which was judged in the same fashion as the Olympic ski jumping competition. The scores for these jumps were used to calculate the deficit with which each athlete began the cross-country portion of the event. Each one point behind the leading score of Georg Hettich was equivalent to four seconds of time deficit.

Rank	Name	Country	Score	Deficit	Notes
1	Georg Hettich	Germany	125.7	0:00	
2	Jason Lamy Chappuis	France	124.4	+0:05	
3	Anssi Koivuranta	Finland	121.5	+0:17	
4	Jaakko Tallus	Finland	120.9	+0:19	
5	Petter Tande	Norway	118.2	+0:30	
6	Michael Gruber	Austria	116.9	+0:35	
7	Yosuke Hatakeyama	Japan	116.1	+0:38	
8	Christoph Bieler	Austria	115.8	+0:40	
9	Akito Watabe	Japan	115.4	+0:41	
10	Ronny Ackermann	Germany	114.0	+0:47	
11	Ivan Fesenko	Russia	112.2	+0:54	
12	Felix Gottwald	Austria	112.1	+0:54	
13	Magnus Moan	Norway	111.8	+0:56	
14	Johnny Spillane	United States	109.5	+1:05	
15	Mario Stecher	Austria	108.9	+1:07	
16	Hannu Manninen	Finland	108.3	+1:10	
17	Damjan Vtic	Slovenia	107.8	+1:12	
18	Daito Takahashi	Japan	107.7	+1:12	
19	Todd Lodwick	United States	107.3	+1:14	
20	Dimitry Matveev	Russia	106.8	+1:16	
21	Björn Kircheisen	Germany	106.5	+1:17	
22	Ronny Heer	Switzerland	105.6	+1:20	
23	Ivan Rieder	Switzerland	105.5	+1:21	
24	Seppi Hurschler	Switzerland	105.3	+1:22	
25	Tomas Slavik	Czech Republic	104.9	+1:23	
26	Giuseppe Michielli	Italy	104.7	+1:24	
26	Ladislav Rygl	Czech Republic	104.7	+1:24	
28	Norihito Kobayashi	Japan	103.9	+1:27	
29	Janne Ryynänen	Finland	102.5	+1:33	
30	Bill Demong	United States	102.2	+1:34	
31	Davide Bresadola	Italy	102.0	+1:35	
32	Sergej Maslennikov	Russia	99.3	+1:46	
33	Andreas Hurschler	Switzerland	98.1	+1:50	
34	Håvard Klemetsen	Norway	98.0	+1:51	
35	Ales Vodsedalek	Czech Republic	97.2	+1:54	
36	Pavel Churavy	Czech Republic	96.1	+1:58	
37	Jochen Strobl	Italy	96.0	+1:59	
38	Tambet Pikkor	Estonia	95.9	+1:59	
39	Nicolas Bal	France	95.4	+2:01	
40	Eric Camerota	United States	94.5	+2:05	
41	Kristian Hammer	Norway	94.3	+2:06	
42	Sebastian Haseney	Germany	90.7	+2:20	
43	Jason Myslicki	Canada	90.0	+2:23	
44	Daniele Munari	Italy	89.2	+2:26	
45	Max Thompson	Canada	84.5	+2:45	
46	Alexsej Barannikov	Russia	83.5	+2:49	
47	Sergei Diyachuk	Ukraine	74.9	+3:23	
48	Volodymyr Trachuk	Ukraine	61.5	+4:17	
-	Ludovic Roux	France	DNS		

=== Cross-Country ===
The start for the 7.5 kilometre race was staggered, with a one-point deficit in the ski jump portion resulting in a four second deficit in starting the cross-country course. This stagger meant that the first athlete across the finish line, Felix Gottwald was the overall winner of the event.

Rank	Name	Country	Deficit	Cross-Country Time	Total	Notes
Gold medal	Felix Gottwald	Austria	+0:54	17:35.0	18.29.0	
Silver medal	Magnus Moan	Norway	+0:56	17:38.4	+0:05.4	
Bronze medal	Georg Hettich	Germany	0:00	18:38.6	+0:09.6	
4	Jason Lamy Chappuis	France	+0:05	18:46.5	+0:22.5	
5	Jaakko Tallus	Finland	+0:19	18:39.1	+0:29.1	
6	Petter Tande	Norway	+0:30	18:29.1	+0:30.1	
7	Björn Kircheisen	Germany	+1:17	17:48.7	+0:36.7	
8	Ronny Ackermann	Germany	+0:47	18:20.7	+0:38.7	
9	Todd Lodwick	United States	+1:14	17:57.4	+0:42.4	
10	Johnny Spillane	United States	+1:05	18:10.2	+0:46.2	
11	Anssi Koivuranta	Finland	+0:17	19:00.7	+0:48.7	
12	Hannu Manninen	Finland	+1:10	18:11.0	+0:52.0	
13	Michael Gruber	Austria	+0:35	18:48.3	+0:54.3	
14	Mario Stecher	Austria	+1:07	18:23.3	+1:01.3	
15	Daito Takahashi	Japan	+1:12	18:19.4	+1:02.4	
16	Giuseppe Michielli	Italy	+1:24	18:08.0	+1:03.0	
17	Ladislav Rygl	Czech Republic	+1:24	18:11.2	+1:06.2	
18	Norihito Kobayashi	Japan	+1:27	18:09.0	+1:07.0	
19	Akito Watabe	Japan	+0:41	18:56.3	+1:08.3	
20	Ronny Heer	Switzerland	+1:20	18:17.7	+1:08.7	
21	Andreas Hurschler	Switzerland	+1:50	17:51.6	+1:12.6	
22	Yosuke Hatakeyama	Japan	+0:38	19:05.0	+1:14.0	
23	Christoph Bieler	Austria	+0:40	19:04.0	+1:15.0	
24	Seppi Hurschler	Switzerland	+1:22	18:29.4	+1:22.4	
25	Bill Demong	United States	+1:34	18:29.7	+1:34.7	
26	Tomas Slavik	Czech Republic	+1:23	18:40.8	+1:34.8	
27	Nicolas Bal	France	+2:01	18:05.7	+1:37.7	
28	Kristian Hammer	Norway	+2:06	18:02.1	+1:39.1	
29	Sebastian Haseney	Germany	+2:20	17:49.1	+1:40.1	
30	Jochen Strobl	Italy	+1:59	18:10.8	+1:40.8	
31	Pavel Churavy	Czech Republic	+1:58	18:11.9	+1:40.9	
32	Tambet Pikkor	Estonia	+1:59	18:15.1	+1:45.1	
33	Ivan Fesenko	Russia	+0:54	19:36.6	+2:01.6	
34	Damjan Vtic	Slovenia	+1:12	19:23.9	+2:06.9	
35	Dmitry Matveyev	Russia	+1:16	19:21.1	+2:08.1	
36	Ivan Rieder	Switzerland	+1:21	19:21.0	+2:13.0	
37	Janne Ryynänen	Finland	+1:33	19:14.6	+2:18.6	
38	Daniele Munari	Italy	+2:26	19:21.0	+2:34.1	
39	Eric Camerota	United States	+2:05	18:59.8	+2:35.8	
40	Håvard Klemetsen	Norway	+1:51	19:15.6	+2:37.6	
41	Jason Myslicki	Canada	+2:23	19:00.1	+2:54.1	
42	Alexsej Barannikov	Russia	+2:49	18:49.2	+3:09.2	
43	Sergej Maslennikov	Russia	+1:46	19:56.1	+3:13.1	
44	Davide Bresadola	Italy	+1:35	20:08.3	+3:14.3	
45	Sergei Diyachuk	Ukraine	+3:23	18:21.1	+3:15.1	
46	Max Thompson	Canada	+2:45	19:24.3	+3:40.3	
47	Ales Vodsedalek	Czech Republic	+1:54	20:51.0	+4:16.0	
48	Volodymyr Trachuk	Ukraine	+4:17	19:40.8	+5:28.8	

1: Determining the finish order of Demong and Slavik required a photo finish, with the American just edging Slavik for 25th place.
