= Nordic combined at the 2006 Winter Olympics – Team =

Team at the XX Olympic Winter Games
- Pictogram for Nordic combined
- Venue: Pragelato
- Dates: February 15–16, 2006
- Competitors: 44 from 11 nations
- Winning time: 49:42.6

Medalists
1st place, gold medalist(s)		Austria; Christoph Bieler, Felix Gottwald, Michael Gruber, Mario Stecher
2nd place, silver medalist(s)		Germany; Ronny Ackermann, Jens Gaiser, Georg Hettich, Björn Kircheisen
3rd place, bronze medalist(s)		Finland; Anssi Koivuranta, Antti Kuisma, Hannu Manninen, Jaakko Tallus

The Men's team Nordic combined competition for the 2006 Winter Olympics was held in Pragelato, Italy. It was originally scheduled for 15 February, but high winds meant that only part of the ski jumping competition was completed on that day, with the conclusion, and the cross-country race, taking place on 16 February.

== Results ==
=== Ski Jumping ===
Each of the four team members, performed two jumps, which were judged in the same fashion as the Olympic ski jumping competition. The scores for all the jumps each team took were summed, and used to calculate their deficit in the cross-country race. Each one point behind the leading score of Germany was equivalent to one second of time deficit. Heavy winds delayed the competition after the first round of jumps; these jumps eventually counted, and the competition was resumed the following day. The world championship team from Norway had to pull out of the competition, as four of its athletes became sick. Had the competition been restarted, they would have been able to compete with a different group of athletes, but keeping the scores from the first day meant that Norway was out. Italy also had to pull out, when Davide Bresadola was forced to go to hospital on account of illness.

Rank	Athlete	Run 1	Rank	Run 2	Rank	Total	Deficit
1	Germany; Jens Gaiser; Björn Kircheisen; Ronny Ackermann; Georg Hettich	464.5; 114.5; 113.7; 114.2; 125.1	1	449.0; 108.7; 114.1; 109.5; 116.7	2	913.5	0:00
2	Austria; Michael Gruber; Mario Stecher; Felix Gottwald; Christoph Bieler	453.4; 115.9; 108.3; 110.5; 118.7	2	449.8; 109.6; 113.5; 107.0; 119.7	1	903.2	0:10
3	Russia; Dimitry Matveev; Ivan Fesenko; Anton Kamenev; Sergej Maslennikov	450.1; 106.8; 105.9; 106.6; 130.8	3	440.0; 102.7; 103.7; 109.6; 124.0	3	890.1	0:23
4	Finland; Anssi Koivuranta; Antti Kuisma; Hannu Manninen; Jaakko Tallus	444.7; 120.4; 97.9; 112.5; 113.9	4	433.9; 108.1; 100.1; 111.9; 113.8	4	878.6	0:35
5	Japan; Yosuke Hatakeyama; Norihito Kobayashi; Takashi Kitamura; Daito Takahashi	437.7; 112.4; 109.9; 105.5; 109.9	5	433.9; 111.6; 111.4; 93.6; 109.9	5	864.2	0:49
6	France; Francois Braud; Nicolas Bal; Ludovic Roux; Jason Lamy Chappuis	431.9; 112.3; 93.0; 102.7; 123.9	6	416.3; 93.4; 89.1; 110.5; 123.3	6	848.2	1:05
7	Switzerland; Jan Schmid; Andreas Hurschler; Ronny Heer; Ivan Rieder	427.5; 112.8; 103.1; 111.5; 100.1	7	412.1; 109.4; 90.3; 100.5; 111.9	7	839.6	1:14
8	United States; Bill Demong; Carl Van Loan; Johnny Spillane; Todd Lodwick	409.9; 107.0; 82.1; 112.8; 108.0	8	410.7; 111.0; 82.1; 105.4; 112.2	8	820.6	1:33
9	Czech Republic; Ales Vodsedalek; Tomas Slavik; Ladislav Rygl; Pavel Churavy	396.3; 98.7; 99.0; 96.6; 102.0	9	408.8; 109.0; 99.6; 99.9; 100.3	9	805.1	1:48
	Italy; Davide Bresadola; Jochen Strobl; Daniele Munari; Giuseppe Michielli	393.9; 111.4; 88.5; 89.8; 104.2	10	DNS	—	—	—
	Norway; Havard Klemetsen; Kristian Hammer; Magnus Moan; Petter Tande	DNS	—	—	—	—	—

=== Cross-Country ===
The start for the 4 × 5 kilometre relay race was staggered, with a one-point deficit in the ski jump portion resulting in a one-second deficit in starting the cross-country course. This stagger meant that the first team across the finish line, Austria was the overall winner of the event. The German team, which started first, led after the third relay leg, but Austria's Mario Stecher gained 36 seconds on Germany's Jens Gaiser on the final leg, taking the Austrian team to the gold medal.

Rank	Athlete	Deficit	Time	Rank	Total
Gold medal	Austria; Michael Gruber; Christoph Bieler; Felix Gottwald; Mario Stecher	+0:10	49:42.6; 11:50.3; 13:01.0; 12:01.4; 12:49.9	1	49:52.6
Silver medal	Germany; Björn Kircheisen; Georg Hettich; Ronny Ackermann; Jens Gaiser	+0:00	50:07.9; 11:23.9; 12:50.4; 12:27.6; 13:26.0	4	+0:15.3
Bronze medal	Finland; Antti Kuisma; Anssi Koivuranta; Jaakko Tallus; Hannu Manninen	+0:35	49:44.4; 11:56.8; 13:01.0; 12:25.5; 12:21.1	2	+0:26.8
4	Switzerland; Ronny Heer; Jan Schmid; Andreas Hurschler; Ivan Rieder	+1:14	50:00.9; 11:42.5; 13:23.0; 12:02.5; 12:52.9	3	+1:22.3
5	France; Francois Braud; Ludovic Roux; Jason Lamy Chappuis; Nicolas Bal	+1:05	50:19.6; 12:09.2; 12:49.6; 12:23.6; 12:57.2	6	+1:32.0
6	Japan; Daito Takahashi; Takashi Kitamura; Norihito Kobayashi; Yosuke Hatakeyama	+0:49	50:47.0; 12:02.5; 12:49.5; 12:33.7; 13:21.3	7	+1:43.4
7	United States; Johnny Spillane; Carl Van Loan; Bill Demong; Todd Lodwick	+1:33	50:19.5; 11:53.2; 13:20.9; 12:24.2; 12:41.2	5	+1:59.9
8	Czech Republic; Ladislav Rygl; Pavel Churavy; Ales Vodsedalek; Tomas Slavik	+1:48	52:10.5; 12:33.7; 12:38.2; 13:15.8; 13:42.8	8	+4:05.9
9	Russia; Ivan Fesenko; Anton Kamenev; Dimitry Matveev; Sergej Maslennikov	+0:23	53:42.1; 12:38.0; 13:52.4; 13:18.5; 13:53.2	9	+4:12.5
