= Japan at the 2006 Winter Olympics =

- IOC code: JPN
- NOC: Japanese Olympic Committee
- Website: www.joc.or.jp (in Japanese and English)

in Turin
- Competitors: 110 (58 men, 52 women) in 14 sports
- Flag bearers: Joji Kato (opening and closing)
- Medals Ranked 18th: Gold 1 Silver 0 Bronze 0 Total 1

Winter Olympics appearances (overview)
- 1928; 1932; 1936; 1948; 1952; 1956; 1960; 1964; 1968; 1972; 1976; 1980; 1984; 1988; 1992; 1994; 1998; 2002; 2006; 2010; 2014; 2018; 2022; 2026

Japan competed at the 2006 Winter Olympics in Turin, Italy. Shizuka Arakawa won the country's only medal, a gold, in women's figure skating. She was the first person born and raised in Asia to become an Olympic champion in that event. Athletes representing Japan participated in all but one of the 2006 Olympics' 15 sports, with Ice hockey the only exception.

== Medalists ==
Medal	Name	Sport	Event	Date
Gold	Shizuka Arakawa	Figure skating	Ladies' singles	February 23

Medals by sport
Sport	1st place, gold medalist(s)	2nd place, silver medalist(s)	3rd place, bronze medalist(s)	Total
Figure skating	1	0	0	1
Total	1	0	0	1

== Alpine skiing ==
Athlete	Event	Final				
Athlete	Event	Run 1	Run 2	Run 3	Total	Rank
Noriyo Hiroi	Women's giant slalom	1:04.63	1:12.03	n/a	2:16.66	26
Noriyo Hiroi	Women's slalom	44.74	48.85	n/a	1:33.59	29
Mizue Hoshi	Women's slalom	45.35	48.03	n/a	1:33.38	27
Yasuhiro Ikuta	Men's slalom	1:15.19	1:08.09	n/a	2:23.28	47
Kentaro Minagawa	Men's slalom	53.44	50.74	n/a	1:44.18	4
Akira Sasaki	Men's giant slalom	did not finish				
Akira Sasaki	Men's slalom	54.37	did not finish			
Mami Sekizuka	Women's slalom	47.22	50.50	n/a	1:37.72	38
Daisuke Yoshioka	Men's giant slalom	1:23.78	1:21.25	n/a	2:45.03	24
Naoki Yuasa	Men's slalom	54.76	49.81	n/a	1:44.57	7

== Biathlon ==
Men

Athlete	Event	Final		
Athlete	Event	Time	Misses	Rank
Daisuke Ebisawa	Sprint	29:49.7	3	63
Hidenori Isa	Sprint	28:37.1	1	39
Hidenori Isa	Pursuit	39:11.25	5	35
Hidenori Isa	Individual	52:27.2	6	10
Tatsumi Kasahara	Sprint	29:07.0	1	48
Tatsumi Kasahara	Pursuit	41:42.07	7	50
Tatsumi Kasahara	Individual	1:02:44.6	5	68
Shinya Saito	Individual	1:05:29.4	8	79
Kyoji Suga	Sprint	30:10.6	2	71
Kyoji Suga	Mass start	52:01.6	5	30
Kyoji Suga	Individual	56:57.7	1	14
Tatsumi Kasahara; Hidenori Isa; Kyoji Suga; Shinya Saito	Relay	1:25:15.6	13	12

Women

Athlete	Event	Final		
Athlete	Event	Time	Misses	Rank
Kanae Meguro	Sprint	26:19.9	4	64
Kanae Meguro	Individual	55:28.4	5	37
Tomomi Otaka	Sprint	26:28.7	3	69
Tomomi Otaka	Individual	1:00:22.2	6	69
Tamami Tanaka	Sprint	26:20.6	5	65
Tamami Tanaka	Individual	55:10.5	4	32
Ikuyo Tsukidate	Sprint	25"17.0	1	51
Ikuyo Tsukidate	Pursuit	Lapped		
Ikuyo Tsukidate	Individual	57:20.4	4	55
Tomomi Otaka; Kanae Meguro; Tamami Tanaka; Ikuyo Tsukidate	Relay	1:26:09.0	18	16

== Bobsleigh ==
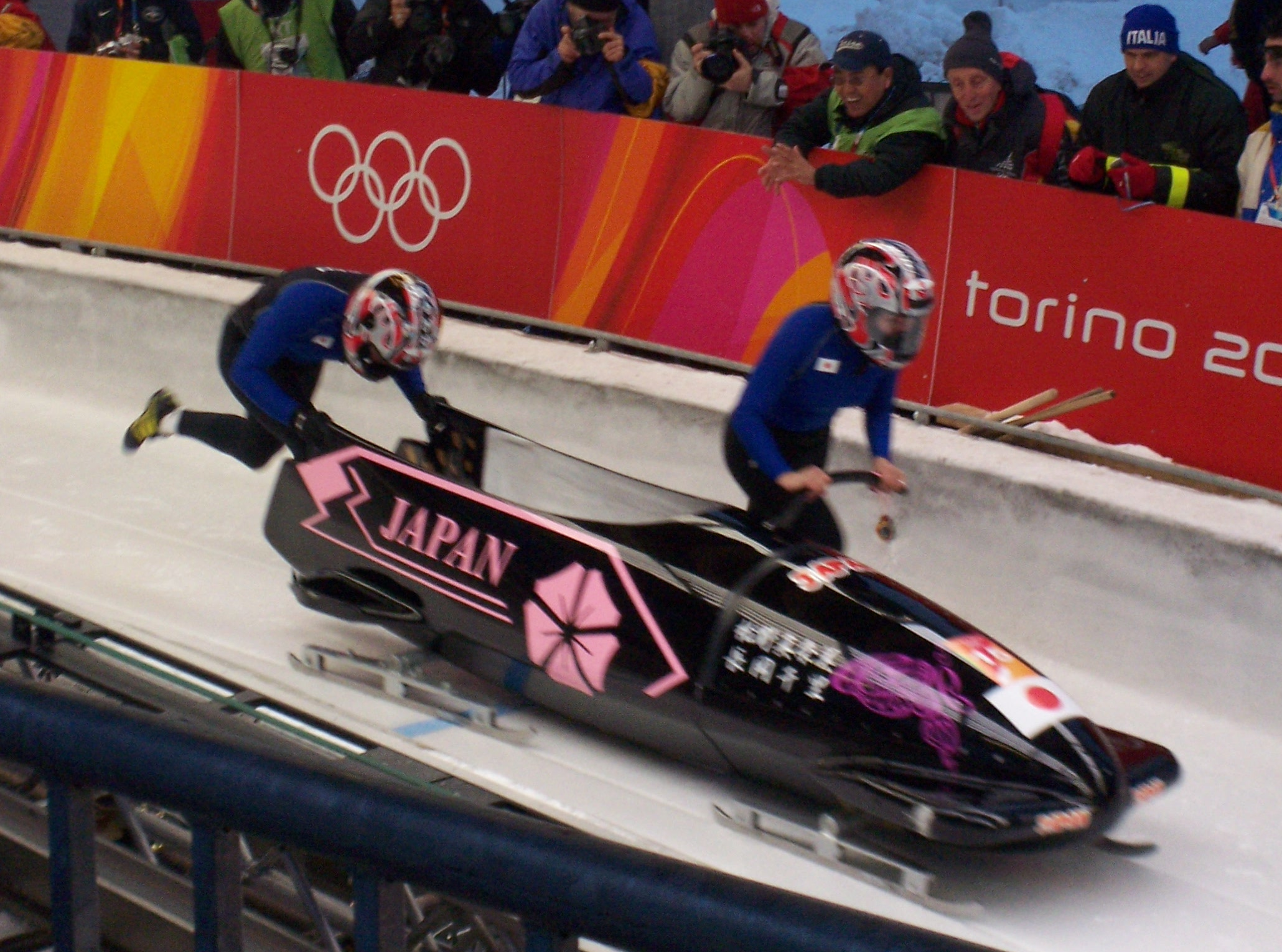
Manami Hino and Chisato Nagaoka

Athlete	Event	Final					
Athlete	Event	Run 1	Run 2	Run 3	Run 4	Total	Rank
Suguru Kiyokawa; Ryuichi Kobayashi	Two-man	57.27	57.02	57.90	did not advance		27
Manami Hino; Chisato Nagaoka	Two-woman	59.41	58.80	59.51	59.77	3:57.49	15

== Cross-country skiing ==
Distance

Athlete	Event	Final	
Athlete	Event	Total	Rank
Katsuhito Ebisawa	Men's 15 km classical	41:25.8	42
Katsuhito Ebisawa	Men's 30 km pursuit	1:21:16.2	42
Katsuhito Ebisawa	Men's 50 km freestyle	2:10:39.6	49
Masako Ishida	Women's 10 km classical	30:24.0	31
Masako Ishida	Women's 15 km pursuit	46:37.7	35
Shunsuke Komamura	Men's 30 km pursuit	Did not finish	
Shunsuke Komamura	Men's 50 km freestyle	2:14:08.8	59
Nobu Naruse	Men's 15 km classical	41:22.0	41
Nobu Naruse	Men's 30 km pursuit	1:25:21.3	59
Nobu Naruse	Men's 50 km freestyle	Did not finish	
Chizuru Soneta	Women's 15 km pursuit	46:45.5	38
Chizuru Soneta	Women's 30 km freestyle	1:27:25.8	25
Sumiko Yokoyama	Women's 15 km pursuit	45:58.6	30
Sumiko Yokoyama	Women's 30 km freestyle	1:29:41.3	37
Nobuko Fukuda; Masako Ishida; Sumiko Yokoyama; Madoka Natsumi	Women's 4 x 5 km relay	56:57.8	12

Sprint

Athlete	Event	Qualifying		Quarterfinal		Semifinal		Final	
Athlete	Event	Total	Rank	Total	Rank	Total	Rank	Total	Rank
Nobuko Fukuda	Women's sprint	2:17.82	28 Q	2:18.2	5	Did not advance			24
Shunsuke Komamura	Men's sprint	2:22.38	43	Did not advance					43
Madoka Natsumi	Women's sprint	2:16.30	15 Q	2:19.9	4	Did not advance			17
Yuichi Onda	Men's sprint	2:17.53	13 Q	2:22.3	6	Did not advance			26
Katsuhito Ebisawa; Yuichi Onda	Men's team sprint	n/a				17:46.6	6	Did not advance	
Nobuko Fukuda; Madoka Natsumi	Women's team sprint	n/a				17:33.1	4 Q	17:27.6	8

== Curling ==
=== Women's ===
Team: Ayumi Onodera (skip), Yumie Hayashi, Mari Motohashi, Moe Meguro, Sakurako Terada (alternate)

Round Robin
Draw 2

Team	1	2	3	4	5	6	7	8	9	10	Final
Russia (Privivkova) 🔨	1	0	0	0	0	1	2	0	0	3	7
Japan (Onodera)	0	0	1	1	2	0	0	1	0	0	5

;Draw 3

Team	1	2	3	4	5	6	7	8	9	10	11	Final
United States (Johnson) 🔨	2	0	0	0	1	0	1	0	1	0	0	5
Japan (Onodera)	0	0	2	1	0	0	0	2	0	0	1	6

;Draw 4

Team	1	2	3	4	5	6	7	8	9	10	Final
Japan (Onodera) 🔨	0	0	0	0	0	2	0	2	0	X	4
Norway (Nordby)	1	0	0	3	1	0	2	0	2	X	9

;Draw 5

Team	1	2	3	4	5	6	7	8	9	10	Final
Japan (Onodera)	0	1	2	1	0	0	0	1	0	0	5
Denmark (Holm) 🔨	1	0	0	0	3	2	0	0	2	1	9

;Draw 8

Team	1	2	3	4	5	6	7	8	9	10	Final
Japan (Onodera) 🔨	0	0	2	1	0	0	1	0	0	1	5
Canada (Kleibrink)	0	0	0	0	0	1	0	1	0	0	2

;Draw 9

Team	1	2	3	4	5	6	7	8	9	10	11	Final
Japan (Onodera) 🔨	1	2	0	0	2	0	0	1	0	1	0	7
Sweden (Norberg)	0	0	0	2	0	2	1	0	2	0	1	8

;Draw 10

Team	1	2	3	4	5	6	7	8	9	10	Final
Great Britain (Martin)	0	0	0	1	0	3	0	1	0	X	5
Japan (Onodera) 🔨	0	2	1	0	3	0	1	0	3	X	10

;Draw 11

Team	1	2	3	4	5	6	7	8	9	10	Final
Italy (Gaspari) 🔨	1	0	0	1	0	1	1	0	0	0	4
Japan (Onodera)	0	1	0	0	1	0	0	2	0	2	6

;Draw 12

Team	1	2	3	4	5	6	7	8	9	10	Final
Switzerland (Ott) 🔨	1	2	0	4	0	0	0	4	X	X	11
Japan (Onodera)	0	0	2	0	1	1	1	0	X	X	5

Standings

Rank	Team	Skip	Won	Lost
1	Sweden	Anette Norberg	7	2
2	Switzerland	Mirjam Ott	7	2
3	Canada	Shannon Kleibrink	6	3
4	Norway	Dordi Nordby	6	3
5	Great Britain	Rhona Martin	5	4
6	Russia	Ludmila Privivkova	5	4
7	Japan	Ayumi Onodera	4	5
8	Denmark	Dorthe Holm	2	7
9	United States	Cassandra Johnson	2	7
10	Italy	Diana Gaspari	1	8

Key: The hammer indicates which team had the last stone in the first end.

== Figure skating ==
Athlete	Event	CD		SP/OD		FS/FD		Total	
Athlete	Event	Points	Rank	Points	Rank	Points	Rank	Points	Rank
Miki Ando	Ladies'	n/a		56.00	8 Q	84.20	16	140.20	15
Shizuka Arakawa	Ladies'	n/a		66.02	3 Q	125.32	1	191.34	Gold medal
Fumie Suguri	Ladies'	n/a		61.75	4 Q	113.48	4	175.23	4
Daisuke Takahashi	Men	n/a		73.77	5 Q	131.12	9	204.89	8
Nozomi Watanabe; Akiyuki Kido	Ice dance	27.95	17	46.59	15	78.87	15	153.41	15

Key: CD = Compulsory Dance, FD = Free Dance, FS = Free Skate, OD = Original Dance, SP = Short Program

== Freestyle skiing ==
Men

Athlete	Event	Qualifying		Final	
Athlete	Event	Points	Rank	Points	Rank
Ken Mizuno	Aerials	157.67	25	did not advance	25
Kai Ozaki	Moguls	19.70	30	did not advance	30
Yugo Tsukita	Moguls	19.13	32	did not advance	32
Osamu Ueno	Moguls	23.03	15 Q	19.54	20

Women

Athlete	Event	Qualifying		Final	
Athlete	Event	Points	Rank	Points	Rank
Miyuki Hatanaka	Moguls	18.61	27	did not advance	27
Kayo Henmi	Aerials	129.40	21	did not advance	21
Miki Ito	Moguls	22.34	15 Q	17.78	20
Tae Satoya	Moguls	23.63	9 Q	22.12	15
Aiko Uemura	Moguls	24.20	5 Q	24.01	5

== Luge ==
Athlete	Event	Final					
Athlete	Event	Run 1	Run 2	Run 3	Run 4	Total	Rank
Madoka Harada	Women's singles	48.042	47.852	47.989	47.767	3:11.650	13
Takahisa Oguchi	Men's singles	52.795	52.449	52.498	52.366	3:30.108	20
Shigeaki Ushijima	Men's singles	53.306	1:29.310	52.414	52.318	4:07.348	34
Goro Hayashibe; Masaki Toshiro	Doubles	48.067	47.793	n/a		1:35.860	12

== Nordic combined ==
Athlete	Event	Ski Jumping		Cross-Country		
Athlete	Event	Points	Rank	Deficit	Time	Rank
Yosuke Hatakeyama	Sprint	116.1	7	0:38	19:43.0 +1:14.0	22
Yosuke Hatakeyama	Individual Gundersen	235.0	10	1:50	44:29.8 +4:45.2	32
Takashi Kitamura	Individual Gundersen	192.5	40	4:40	47:17.3 +7:32.7	43
Norihito Kobayashi	Sprint	103.9	28	1:27	19:36.0 +1:07.0	18
Norihito Kobayashi	Individual Gundersen	217.0	23	3:02	42:23.1 +2:38.5	16
Daito Takahashi	Sprint	107.7	18	1:12	19:31.4 +1:02.4	15
Daito Takahashi	Individual Gundersen	233.5	12	1:56	did not start	
Akito Watabe	Sprint	115.4	9	0:41	19:37.3 +1:08.3	19
Yosuke Hatakeyama; Norihito Kobayashi; Takashi Kitamura; Daito Takahashi	Team	864.2	5	0:49	51:36.0 +1:43.4	6

Note: 'Deficit' refers to the amount of time behind the leader a competitor began the cross-country portion of the event. Italicized numbers show the final deficit from the winner's finishing time.

== Short track speed skating ==
Athlete	Event	Heat		Quarterfinal		Semifinal		Final	
Athlete	Event	Time	Rank	Time	Rank	Time	Rank	Time	Rank
Yuka Kamino	Women's 500 m	45.848	2 Q	47.356	4	did not advance			14
Yuka Kamino	Women's 1000 m	1:33.959	3	did not advance					14
Yuka Kamino	Women's 1500 m	2:37.865	3 Q	n/a		2:44.057	4	Final B 2:29.540	7
Takafumi Nishitani	Men's 500 m	43.212	3	did not advance					15
Mika Ozawa	Women's 1000 m	1:34.715	2 Q	1:33.337	5	1:33.337	5	did not advance	9
Hayato Sueyoshi	Men's 1500 m	2:25.280	4	did not advance					19
Chikage Tanaka	Women's 500 m	46.387	3	did not advance					17
Satoru Terao	Men's 500 m	42.607	1 Q	42.471	2 Q	42.120	3	Final B 42.377	6
Satoru Terao	Men's 1000 m	1:29.090	2 Q	1:28.499	3	did not advance			9
Satoru Terao	Men's 1500 m	2:37.865	3 Q	n/a		2:44.057	4	Final B 2:24.875	9
Ikue Teshigawara	Women's 1500 m	2:30.977	4	did not advance					17
Yoshiharu Arino; Takahiro Fijimoto; Takfumi Nishitani; Satoru Terao	Men's 5000 m relay	disqualified							
Yuka Kamino; Mika Ozawa; Chikage Tanaka; Nobuko Yamada	Women's 3000 m relay	did not advance				4:21.413	4	Final B 4:35.096	7

== Skeleton ==
Athlete	Event	Final			
Athlete	Event	Run 1	Run 2	Total	Rank
Masaru Inada	Men's	59.63	59.74	1:59.37	18
Kazuhiro Koshi	Men's	58.65	59.40	1:58.05	11
Eiko Nakayama	Women's	1:01.82	1:02.10	2:03.92	14

== Ski jumping ==
Athlete	Event	Qualifying		First Round		Final		
Athlete	Event	Points	Rank	Points	Rank	Points	Total	Rank
Masahiko Harada	Normal hill	disqualified						
Tsuyoshi Ichinohe	Large hill	89.9	18 Q	108.5	16 Q	93.9	202.4	25
Daiki Ito	Normal hill	123.0	9 Q	126.0	13 Q	117.5	243.5	18
Daiki Ito	Large hill	110.9	6 Q	82.5	42	did not advance		42
Noriaki Kasai	Normal hill	132.5	1 Q	126.0	13 Q	115.0	241.0	20
Noriaki Kasai	Large hill	117.3	1 Q	104.0	21 Q	123.3	227.3	12
Takanobu Okabe	Normal hill	127.5	7 PQ	118.0	24 Q	111.5	229.5	23
Takanobu Okabe	Large hill	122.1	7 PQ	115.0	8 Q	121.8	236.8	8
Tsuyoshi Ichinohe; Daiki Ito; Noriaki Kasai; Takanobu Okabe	Team	n/a		426.8	6 Q	466.3	893.1	6

Note: PQ indicates a skier was pre-qualified for the final, based on entry rankings.

== Snowboarding ==
Halfpipe

Men

Athlete	Event	Qualifying Run 1		Qualifying Run 2		Final		
Athlete	Event	Points	Rank	Points	Rank	Run 1	Run 2	Rank
Kazuhiro Kokubo	Halfpipe	26.9	23	31.0	17	did not advance		23
Fumiyuki Murakami	Halfpipe	27.9	20	31.1	16	did not advance		22
Takaharu Nakai	Halfpipe	36.0	9	36.8	8	did not advance		14
Domu Narita	Halfpipe	31.5	15	14.7	29	did not advance		35

Women

Athlete	Event	Qualifying Run 1		Qualifying Run 2		Final		
Athlete	Event	Points	Rank	Points	Rank	Run 1	Run 2	Rank
Chikako Fushimi	Halfpipe	13.0	26	34.8	6 Q	(9.5)	15.6	12
Melo Imai	Halfpipe	7.2	31	1.4	28	did not advance		34
Shiho Nakashima	Halfpipe	35.5	5 Q	n/a		33.1	(30.6)	9
Soko Yamaoka	Halfpipe	28.5	14	35.6	5 Q	(22.4)	32.7	10

Note: In the final, the single best score from two runs is used to determine the ranking. A bracketed score indicates a run that wasn't counted.

Parallel GS

Athlete	Event	Qualification		Round of 16	Quarterfinals	Semifinals	Finals	
Athlete	Event	Time	Rank	Opposition Time	Opposition Time	Opposition Time	Opposition Time	Rank
Tomoka Takeuchi	Women's parallel giant slalom	1:21.67	9 Q	Guenther (AUT) (8); L +0.24 (+0.10 +0.14)	did not advance			9
Kentaro Tsuruoka	Men's parallel giant slalom	1:18.14	28	did not advance				28
Eri Yanetani	Women's parallel giant slalom	1:23.21	18	did not advance				18

Key: '+ Time' represents a deficit; the brackets indicate the results of each run.

Snowboard Cross

Athlete	Event	Qualifying		1/8 Finals	Quarterfinals	Semifinals	Finals	
Athlete	Event	Time	Rank	Position	Position	Position	Position	Rank
Itaru Chimura	Men's snowboard cross	1:22.83	27 Q	2 Q	4	did not advance	Classification 13-16; 4	16
Yuka Fujimori	Women's snowboard cross	1:32.46	15 Q	n/a	2 Q	4	Classification 5-8; 3	7

== Speed skating ==
Men

Athlete	Event	Race 1		Final	
Athlete	Event	Time	Rank	Time	Rank
Yusuke Imai	1000 m	n/a		1:10.48	20
Yusuke Imai	1500 m	n/a		1:50.56	34
Joji Kato	500 m	35.59	35.19	1:10.78	6
Kesato Miyazaki	5000 m	n/a		6:40.03	21
Keiichiro Nagashima	500 m	35.67	35.47	1:11.14	13
Keiichiro Nagashima	1000 m	n/a		1:11.78	32
Takaharu Nakajima	1000 m	n/a		1:11.10	27
Takaharu Nakajima	1500 m	n/a		1:51.61	38
Yuya Oikawa	500 m	35.35	35.21	1:10.56	4
Hiroyasu Shimizu	500 m	35.66	35.78	1:11.44	18
Teruhiro Sugimori	1500 m	n/a		1:49.51	24
Takahiro Ushiyama	1000 m	n/a		1:11.21	28
Takahiro Ushiyama	1500 m	n/a		1:50.59	35
Takahiro Ushiyama	5000 m	n/a		6:51.53	27

Women

Athlete	Event	Race 1		Final	
Athlete	Event	Time	Rank	Time	Rank
Eriko Ishino	1500 m	n/a		2:01.85	22
Eriko Ishino	3000 m	n/a		4:11.21	13
Eriko Ishino	5000 m	n/a		7:12.48	11
Nami Nemoto	1500 m	n/a		2:02.34	29
Tomomi Okazaki	500 m	38.46	38.46	1:16.92	4
Tomomi Okazaki	1000 m	n/a		1:17.63	16
Sayuri Osuga	500 m	38.65	38.74	1:17.39	8
Hiromi Otsu	1500 m	n/a		2:04.77	33
Eriko Seo	3000 m	n/a		4:16.27	20
Maki Tabata	1000 m	n/a		1:17.64	17
Maki Tabata	1500 m	n/a		2:00.77	15
Maki Tabata	3000 m	n/a		4:12.38	14
Maki Tabata	5000 m	n/a		7:18.05	13
Aki Tonoike	1000 m	n/a		1:17.64	17
Yukari Watanabe	500 m	39.46	39.19	1:18.65	15
Sayuri Yoshii	500 m	38.68	38.75	1:17.43	9
Sayuri Yoshii	1000 m	n/a		1:17.58	15

Team Pursuit

Athlete	Event	Seeding		Quarterfinal	Semifinal	Final	
Athlete	Event	Time	Rank	Opposition Time	Opposition Time	Opposition Time	Rank
From: Teruhiro Sugimori; Kesato Miyazaki; Takahiro Ushiyama	Men's team pursuit	4:03.83	8	Canada (1); L 3:53.88	did not advance	7th place Final; Germany (5); L 3:50.37	8
From: Eriko Ishino; Nami Nemoto; Hiromi Otsu; Maki Tabata	Women's team pursuit	3:08.34	7	Norway (2); W Overtook	Canada (3); L 3:05.95	Bronze Final; Russia (1); L Overtaken	4
