= Ukraine at the 2006 Winter Olympics =

- IOC code: UKR
- NOC: National Olympic Committee of Ukraine
- Website: www.noc-ukr.org (in Ukrainian and English)

in Turin
- Competitors: 52 (30 men, 22 women) in 9 sports
- Flag bearers: Natalia Yakushenko (opening and closing)
- Medals Ranked 25th: Gold 0 Silver 0 Bronze 2 Total 2

Winter Olympics appearances (overview)
- 1994; 1998; 2002; 2006; 2010; 2014; 2018; 2022; 2026

Other related appearances
- Czechoslovakia (1924–1936); Poland (1924–1936); Romania (1924–1936); Soviet Union (1956–1988); Unified Team (1992)

Ukraine competed at the 2006 Winter Olympics in Turin, Italy.

== Medalists ==
Medal	Name	Sport	Event	Date
Bronze	Lilia Efremova	Biathlon	Women's sprint	16 February
Bronze	Elena Grushina; Ruslan Goncharov	Figure skating	Ice dance	20 February

== Competitors ==
The following is the list of number of competitors participating at the Games per sport/discipline.

Sport	Men	Women	Total
Alpine skiing	1	1	2
Biathlon	5	5	10
Cross-country	7	5	13
Figure skating	5	6	11
Freestyle skiing	4	3	7
Luge	4	2	6
Nordic combined	2	0	2
Short track speed skating	1	0	1
Ski jumping	1	0	1
Total	30	22	52

== Alpine skiing ==
Mykola Skriabin managed to qualify and compete in each of the five men's disciplines, with his top finish a 26th in the giant slalom.

Athlete	Event	Final				
Athlete	Event	Run 1	Run 2	Run 3	Total	Rank
Yuliya Siparenko	Women's giant slalom	1:10.43	1:15.50	n/a	2:25.93	35
Yuliya Siparenko	Women's slalom	50.31	52.95	n/a	1:43.26	45
Mykola Skriabin	Men's downhill	n/a			1:57.56	47
Mykola Skriabin	Men's super-G	n/a			1:38.86	53
Mykola Skriabin	Men's giant slalom	1:25.81	1:25.04	n/a	2:50.85	26
Mykola Skriabin	Men's slalom	1:01.98	57.98	n/a	1:59.96	36
Mykola Skriabin	Men's combined	1:46.63	51.21	did not finish		

Note: In the men's combined, run 1 is the downhill, and runs 2 and 3 are the slalom. In the women's combined, run 1 and 2 are the slalom, and run 3 the downhill.

== Biathlon ==
Lilia Efremova, who had failed to finish in the top 30 in any event at the 2005 World Championships, shot perfectly and survived a relatively slow finish to earn a bronze medal in the women's sprint.

Men

Athlete	Event	Final		
Athlete	Event	Time	Misses	Rank
Olexander Bilanenko	Sprint	28:26.6	0	36
Olexander Bilanenko	Pursuit	did not start		
Olexander Bilanenko	Individual	1:00:28.6	3	49
Vyacheslav Derkach	Sprint	30:15.8	2	72
Andriy Deryzemlya	Sprint	28:15.2	2	28
Andriy Deryzemlya	Pursuit	38:54.38	6	31
Andriy Deryzemlya	Individual	59:47.2	3	39
Alexei Korobeynikov	Individual	1:01:17.8	4	54
Ruslan Lysenko	Sprint	28:56.6	2	44
Ruslan Lysenko	Pursuit	40:16.42	5	41
Ruslan Lysenko	Individual	57:16.6	1	18
Olexander Bilanenko; Andriy Deryzemlya; Alexei Korobeynikov; Ruslan Lysenko	Relay	1:23:40.4	1+11	7

Women

Athlete	Event	Final		
Athlete	Event	Time	Misses	Rank
Lilia Efremova	Sprint	22:38.0	0	Bronze medal
Lilia Efremova	Pursuit	39:09.89	3	8
Lilia Efremova	Mass start	43:21.0	6	17
Lilia Efremova	Individual	55:28.0	5	36
Oksana Khvostenko	Sprint	25:10.1	1	49
Oksana Khvostenko	Pursuit	Lapped		
Oksana Khvostenko	Individual	53:22.5	1	20
Nina Lemesh	Sprint	25:13.5	2	50
Nina Lemesh	Pursuit	43:48.67	7	41
Olena Petrova	Sprint	24:52.2	2	44
Olena Petrova	Pursuit	did not start		
Olena Petrova	Individual	54:35.6	3	29
Valj Semerenko	Individual	56:22.6	3	46
Oksana Khvostenko; Olena Petrova; Nina Lemesh; Lilia Efremova	Relay	1:21:55.5	3+14	11

== Cross-country skiing ==
Twelve skiers represented Ukraine in Turin, the largest delegation in any sport. The top finish came from Valentina Shevchenko in the women's 30 kilometre freestyle; she had the fastest time at the 20 kilometre mark, but fell off the pace to end up 7th.

Distance

Men

Athlete	Event	Final	
Athlete	Event	Total	Rank
Oleksandr Batiuk	15 km classical	43:17.4	63
Oleksandr Batiuk	30 km pursuit	1:24:35.9	57
Mikhail Gumenyak	30 km pursuit	1:22:24.6	46
Mikhail Gumenyak	50 km freestyle	2:13:44.6	56
Roman Leybyuk	15 km classical	39:48.1	17
Roman Leybyuk	30 km pursuit	1:22:31.5	49
Vitaly Martsyv	15 km classical	42:57.4	61
Vladmir Olschanski	15 km classical	42:39.6	56
Vladmir Olschanski	50 km freestyle	2:16:14.7	62
Olexandr Putsko	30 km pursuit	1:22:37.6	52
Olexandr Putsko	50 km freestyle	Did not finish	
Roman Leybyuk; Vladmir Olschanski; Olexandr Putsko; Mikhail Gumenyak	4 x 10 km relay	1:50:01.9	14

Women

Athlete	Event	Final	
Athlete	Event	Total	Rank
Kateryna Grygorenko	10 km classical	31:16.6	44
Kateryna Grygorenko	15 km pursuit	46:55.2	40
Kateryna Grygorenko	30 km freestyle	1:31:36.9	42
Vita Jakimchuk	15 km pursuit	45:48.1	26
Vita Jakimchuk	30 km freestyle	1:26:32.2	22
Marina Malets-Lisogor	30 km freestyle	Did not finish	
Valentina Shevchenko	10 km classical	29:40.4	21
Valentina Shevchenko	15 km pursuit	44:13.6	14
Valentina Shevchenko	30 km freestyle	1:23:07.9	7
Tatjana Zavalij	10 km classical	30:13.2	27
Tatjana Zavalij	15 km pursuit	47:18.7	45
Kateryna Grygorenko; Tatjana Zavalij; Vita Jakimchuk; Valentina Shevchenko	4 x 5 km relay	56:36.3	8

Sprint

Athlete	Event	Qualifying		Quarterfinal		Semifinal		Final	
Athlete	Event	Total	Rank	Total	Rank	Total	Rank	Total	Rank
Ivan Bilosyuk	Men's sprint	2:21.97	40	Did not advance					40
Mikhail Gumenyak	Men's sprint	2:28.72	62	Did not advance					62
Vita Jakimchuk	Women's sprint	2:19.92	36	Did not advance					36
Marina Malets-Lisogor	Women's sprint	2:20.79	43	Did not advance					43
Vitaly Martsyv	Men's sprint	2:22.30	42	Did not advance					42
Olexandr Putsko	Men's sprint	2:30.99	66	Did not advance					66
Ivan Bilosyuk; Vitaly Martsyv	Men's team sprint	n/a				18:50.4	9	Did not advance	17
Marina Malets-Lisogor; Tatjana Zavalij	Women's team sprint	n/a				19:14.1	8	Did not advance	16

== Figure skating ==
Elena Grushina and Ruslan Goncharov, the 2005 World Championship bronze medalists, earned the same result in Turin, rallying from a poor start to end up in 3rd.

Athlete	Event	CD		SP/OD		FS/FD		Total	
Athlete	Event	Points	Rank	Points	Rank	Points	Rank	Points	Rank
Galina Efremenko	Ladies'	n/a		41.25	24 'Q	84.12	17	125.37	20
Elena Liashenko	Ladies'	n/a		52.35	13 'Q	81.73	18	134.08	17
Anton Kovalevski	Men's	n/a		63.41	16 'Q	109.43	21	172.84	20
Julia Beloglazova; Andrei Bekh	Pairs	n/a		43.85	17	71.77	19	115.62	18
Julia Golovina; Oleg Voiko	Ice dance	23.88	23	39.92	24	64.69	23	128.49	23
Elena Grushina; Ruslan Goncharov	Ice dance	37.39	5	59.29	3	99.17	3	195.85	Bronze medal
Tatiana Volosozhar; Stanislav Morozov	Pairs	n/a		50.14	12	98.24	12	148.38	12

Key: CD = Compulsory Dance, FD = Free Dance, FS = Free Skate, OD = Original Dance, SP = Short Program

== Freestyle skiing ==
Ukraine sent seven athletes to compete in the freestyle skiing events, specifically men's and women's aerials, but only one, Enver Ablaev, managed to qualify for a final.

Athlete	Event	Qualifying		Final	
Athlete	Event	Points	Rank	Points	Rank
Enver Ablaev	Men's aerials	226.89	9 Q	150.48	12
Oleksandr Abramenko	Men's aerials	149.47	27	n/a	27
Nadiya Didenko	Women's aerials	136.91	20	n/a	20
Igor Ishutko	Men's aerials	153.04	26	n/a	26
Tatiana Kozachenko	Women's aerials	147.51	18	n/a	18
Stanislav Kravchuk	Men's aerials	221.69	13	n/a	13
Olha Volkova	Women's aerials	160.03	13	n/a	13

== Luge ==
The doubles team of Oleg Zherebetskyy and Roman Yazvinskyy, who finished 19th in the first run of the event, pulled out after suffering a serious crash. Yazvinskyy was air-lifted to hospital with a head injury, but he remained conscious and was released the next day.

Athlete	Event	Final					
Athlete	Event	Run 1	Run 2	Run 3	Run 4	Total	Rank
Liliya Ludan	Women's singles	47.439	47.378	47.150	47.308	3:09.275	6
Natalia Yakushenko	Women's singles	54.189	did not start				
Andriy Kis; Yuriy Hayduk	Doubles	48.850	48.327	n/a		1:37.177	14
Oleg Zherebetskyy; Roman Yazvinskyy	Doubles	50.897	did not start				

== Nordic combined ==
Sergei Diyachuk and Volodymyr Trachuk both finished in the bottom five in the two Nordic combined events in Turin.

Athlete	Event	Ski jumping		Cross-country		
Athlete	Event	Points	Rank	Deficit	Time	Rank
Sergei Diyachuk	Sprint	74.9	47	3:23	21:44.1 +3:15.1	45
Sergei Diyachuk	Individual Gundersen	151.0	48	7:26	48:08.1 +8:23.5	45
Volodymyr Trachuk	Sprint	61.5	48	4:17	23:57.8 +5:28.8	48
Volodymyr Trachuk	Individual Gundersen	140.0	49	8:10	23:57.8 +5:28.8	48

Note: 'Deficit' refers to the amount of time behind the leader a competitor began the cross-country portion of the event. Italicized numbers show the final deficit from the winner's finishing time.

== Short track speed skating ==
Volodymyr Grygoriev, Ukraine's only speed skater in Turin, advanced from his heat in the 1000 metres, but then finished last in his quarterfinal.

Athlete	Event	Heat		Quarterfinal		Semifinal		Final	
Athlete	Event	Time	Rank	Time	Rank	Time	Rank	Time	Rank
Volodymyr Grygoriev	Men's 500 m	43.583	3	did not advance					17
Volodymyr Grygoriev	Men's 1000 m	1:36.397	2 Q	1:29.168	5	did not advance			15

== Ski jumping ==
Ukraine's lone competing ski jumper, Volodymyr Boschuk, did not progress beyond the qualification round in either the normal or large hill events.

Athlete	Event	Qualifying		First round		Final		
Athlete	Event	Points	Rank	Points	Rank	Points	Total	Rank
Volodymyr Boschuk	Normal hill	88.5	47	did not advance				
Volodymyr Boschuk	Large hill	30.6	51	did not advance				
