= Nordic combined at the 2010 Winter Olympics – Individual large hill/10 km =

Men's individual large hill/10 km at the XXI Olympic Winter Games
- Pictogram for Nordic combined
- Venue: Whistler Olympic Park
- Dates: 25 February 2010
- Competitors: 46 from 14 nations
- Winning time: 25:32.9

Medalists
1st place, gold medalist(s)		Bill Demong	United States
2nd place, silver medalist(s)		Johnny Spillane	United States
3rd place, bronze medalist(s)		Bernhard Gruber	Austria

The men's individual large hill/10 km Nordic combined competition for the 2010 Winter Olympics in Vancouver, Canada was held at Whistler Olympic Park in Whistler, British Columbia on 25 February.

Austria's Felix Gottwald was the defending Olympic champion when the event was known as the 7.5 km Sprint. Gottwald retired originally after the 2006-07 World Cup season, but came out of retirement in May 2009 to compete for the 2009-10 World Cup season including the 2010 Games. Bill Demong of the United States was the defending world champion in this event.

Two test events took place at the Olympic venue on 16–17 January 2009 with Demong winning on the 16th and Norway's Magnus Moan, defending Olympic silver medalist in this event when it was the 7.5 km sprint, winning on the 17th. The last World Cup event prior to the 2010 Games in this format took place on 10 January 2010 in Val di Fiemme, Italy and was won by Demong.

== Results ==
=== Ski Jumping ===
The ski jumping took place with a trial round at 09:00 PST and the competition round at 10:00 PST. One jump in competition was scored similar to that of ski jumping. With 28 skiers having competed their jumps, officials abandoned the competition to high winds. They were restarted at 11:00 PST (19:00 GMT). Jumping resumed despite complaints from co-test event winner Moan, defending Olympic champion Gottwald, and Lamy-Chappuis, the current World Cup leader and winner of the 10 km individual normal hill gold medal on the 14th. Moan described the jumps as a "joke" while a French coach called the FIS's decision as a "scandal". Despite the complaints, Gottwald's teammate Gruber had the longest jump with 134.0 m.

Rank	Bib	Name	Country	Distance (m)	Points	Time Difference
1	27	Bernhard Gruber	Austria	134.0	127.0	+0:00
2	39	Johnny Spillane	United States	129.0	118.5	+0:34
3	28	Janne Ryynänen	Finland	128.0	117.0	+0:40
4	30	Christoph Bieler	Austria	127.5	116.8	+0:41
5	18	Francois Braud	France	127.5	116.3	+0:43
6	37	Bill Demong	United States	127.0	115.5	+0:46
7	10	Lukas Runggaldier	Italy	126.5	114.2	+0:51
8	40	Pavel Churavy	Czech Republic	126.0	114.0	+0:52
9	31	Akito Watabe	Japan	125.0	112.5	+0:58
10	33	Petter L. Tande	Norway	123.5	109.8	+1:09
10	41	Mario Stecher	Austria	123.5	109.8	+1:09
12	38	Björn Kircheisen	Germany	123.5	108.8	+1:13
13	34	Todd Lodwick	United States	122.5	108.7	+1:13
13	36	Alessandro Pittin	Italy	122.5	108.7	+1:13
15	12	Tommy Schmid	Switzerland	125.0	108.5	+1:14
16	32	Hannu Manninen	Finland	122.5	107.7	+1:17
17	19	Georg Hettich	Germany	121.5	106.3	+1:23
18	17	Tomas Slavik	Czech Republic	120.5	104.7	+1:29
19	13	Espen Rian	Norway	120.5	104.2	+1:31
20	3	Ales Vodsedalek	Czech Republic	119.5	102.8	+1:37
21	9	Sergey Maslennikov	Russia	118.5	101.2	+1:43
21	20	Sebastien Lacroix	France	118.5	101.2	+1:43
23	2	Armin Bauer	Italy	117.5	99.8	+1:49
24	26	Ronny Heer	Switzerland	115.0	96.0	+2:04
25	21	Jaakko Tallus	Finland	115.5	95.8	+2:05
26	1	Niyaz Nabeev	Russia	115.5	95.3	+2:07
27	16	Giuseppe Michielli	Italy	114.0	94.0	+2:12
28	43	Magnus Moan	Norway	112.5	91.7	+2:21
29	46	Jason Lamy-Chappuis	France	113.0	91.5	+2:22
30	29	Norihito Kobayashi	Japan	112.0	90.5	+2:26
31	22	Taihei Kato	Japan	112.5	90.2	+2:27
32	6	Gašper Berlot	Slovenia	112.5	89.2	+2:31
33	11	Mitja Oranič	Slovenia	111.0	88.5	+2:34
34	15	Yūsuke Minato	Japan	110.0	87.0	+2:40
35	42	Tino Edelmann	Germany	109.5	86.3	+2:43
36	24	Miroslav Dvořák	Czech Republic	107.5	83.8	+2:53
37	14	Tim Hug	Switzerland	107.0	82.5	+2:58
38	23	Seppi Hurschler	Switzerland	107.5	82.3	+2:59
39	8	Maxime Laheurte	France	106.0	80.0	+3:08
40	45	Felix Gottwald	Austria	105.5	78.8	+3:13
41	44	Eric Frenzel	Germany	104.5	74.2	+3:31
42	5	Jason Myslicki	Canada	99.5	69.3	+3:51
43	4	Volodymyr Trachuk	Ukraine	99.5	68.8	+3:53
44	35	Anssi Koivuranta	Finland	97.5	66.3	+4:03
45	25	Mikko Kokslien	Norway	96.5	64.2	+4:11
46	7	Taylor Fletcher	United States	82.0	38.0	+5:56

=== Cross-Country ===
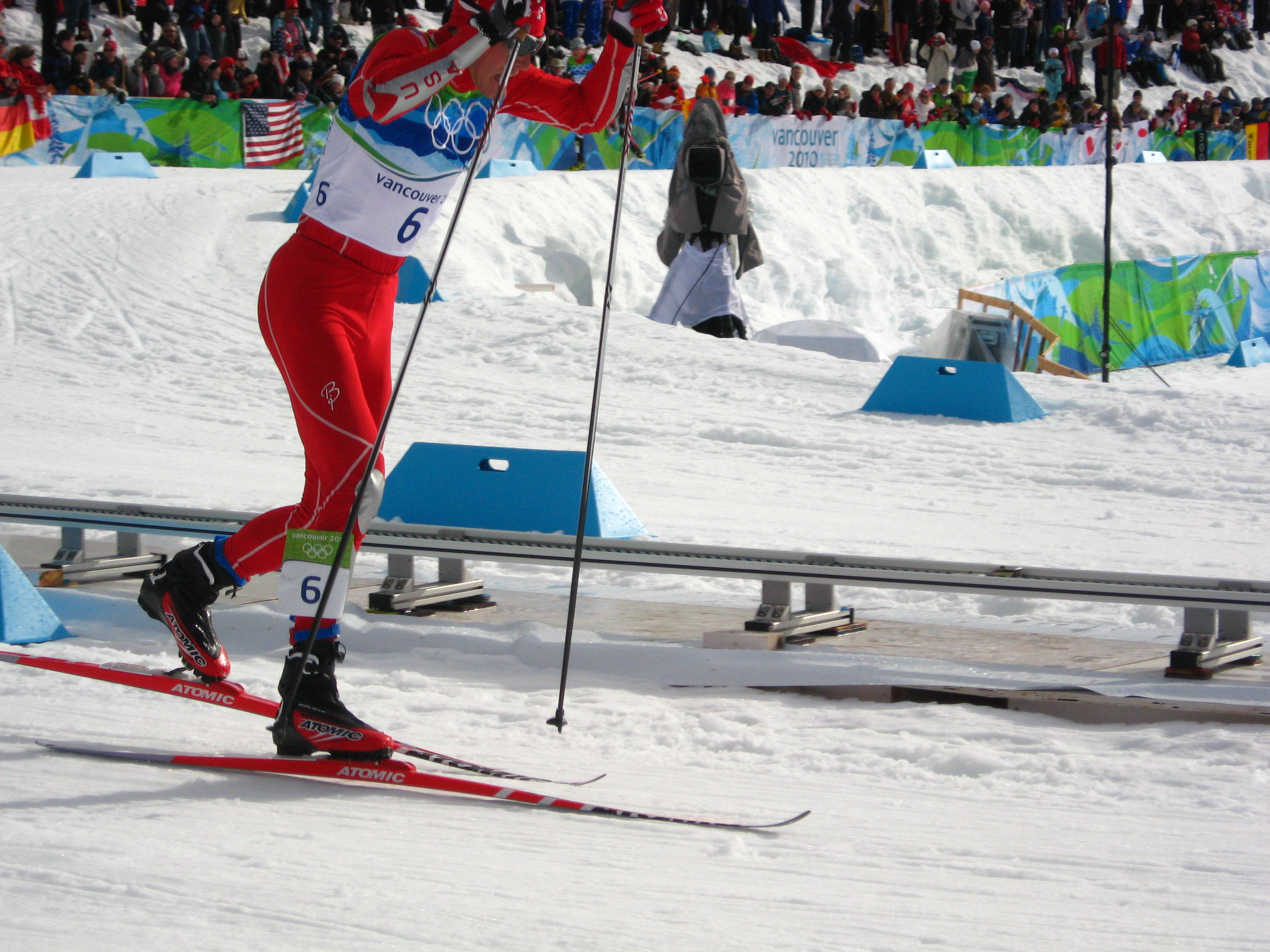
Bill Demong skating to victory

The start for the 10 kilometre race was staggered, with a one-point deficit in the ski jump portion resulting in a four-second deficit in starting the cross-country course. This stagger meant that the first athlete across the finish line would be the overall winner of the event. Cross-country skiing's part of the competition was scheduled to take place at 13:00 PST that same day, but was moved to 14:00 PST in the wake of the high winds during the ski jumping part of the competition.

Finland's Koivuranta, who finished 44th in the ski jumping part of this event, did not start in the cross-county portion of this event. Defending Olympic champion Gottwald had the fastest cross-country skiing part of the event to move from 40th to 17th. Meanwhile, Spillane and defending World champion Demong caught ski jumping leader Gruber at the 4.0 km mark though all three skiers stayed together until 600 m was left in the event before Demong and Spillane pulled away to finish one-two in the event. Spillane won his third Olympic silver medal in this Olympics while Demong's gold followed his silver earned in the team event two days earlier. In the post-race press conference, Demong stated that Spillane's silver in the 10 km individual normal hill event was "a dream come true" on 14 February, the silver in the team event was "icing on the cake", and that his gold was "something extra". Spillane stated that if there was one person who he wanted to beat him, "...it would have been Bill". Bronze medalist Gruber commented that Demong and Spillane "...were just too strong". It marked the first time an American won a gold medal in Nordic skiing (cross-country skiing, Nordic combined, ski jumping) in the Winter Olympics.

After the medal ceremony held later that evening, Demong proposed to his girlfriend, Katie Koczynski, in front of teammates and coaches at the team headquarters near Vancouver. Koczynski said yes. Also on that same day, Demong found out he was named the flagbearer for the American team at the closing ceremonies of the 2010 Winter Olympics on 28 February. It was Demong's teammate, Spillane, who gave Demong the courage to propose to his now fiancée. Demong and his fiancée discussed how this happened on NBC's Today show the following morning.

Rank	Bib	Name	Country	Start time	Cross country time	Cross country rank	Finish time
1st place, gold medalist(s)	6	Bill Demong	United States	+0:46	24:46.9	2	25:32.9
2nd place, silver medalist(s)	2	Johnny Spillane	United States	+0:34	25:02.9	7	+4.0
3rd place, bronze medalist(s)	1	Bernhard Gruber	Austria	+0:00	25:43.7	19	+10.8
4	16	Hannu Manninen	Finland	+1:17	24:49.0	4	+33.1
5	8	Pavel Churavy	Czech Republic	+0:52	25:14.9	9	+34.0
6	11	Petter L. Tande	Norway	+1:09	25:02.2	6	+38.3
7	13	Alessandro Pittin	Italy	+1:13	25:00.6	5	+40.7
8	10	Mario Stecher	Austria	+1:09	25:12.1	8	+48.2
9	9	Akito Watabe	Japan	+0:58	25:23.7	11	+48.8
10	4	Christoph Bieler	Austria	+0:41	25:40.7	18	+48.8
11	7	Lukas Runggaldier	Italy	+0:51	25:40.6	17	+58.7
12	3	Janne Ryynänen	Finland	+0:40	26:00.9	25	+1:08.0
13	14	Todd Lodwick	United States	+1:13	25:30.2	14	+1:10.3
14	5	Francois Braud	France	+0:43	26:16.6	31	+1:26.7
15	28	Magnus Moan	Norway	+2:21	24:48.9	3	+1:37.0
16	15	Tommy Schmid	Switzerland	+1:14	26:11.7	29	+1:52.8
17	40	Felix Gottwald	Austria	+3:13	24:29.4	1	+2:09.5
18	29	Jason Lamy-Chappuis	France	+2:22	25:22.6	10	+2:11.7
19	21	Sebastien Lacroix	France	+1:43	26:02.2	26	+2:12.3
20	12	Björn Kircheisen	Germany	+1:13	26:33.5	37	+2:13.6
21	23	Armin Bauer	Italy	+1:49	26:00.1	23	+2:16.2
22	24	Ronny Heer	Switzerland	+2:04	25:45.5	21	+2:16.6
23	27	Giuseppe Michielli	Italy	+2:12	25:38.3	16	+2:17.4
24	17	Georg Hettich	Germany	+1:23	26:32.5	36	+2:22.6
25	18	Tomas Slavik	Czech Republic	+1:29	26:29.8	35	+2:25.9
26	34	Yūsuke Minato	Japan	+2:40	25:30.0	13	+2:37.1
27	30	Norihito Kobayashi	Japan	+2:26	26:00.1	23	+2:53.2
28	36	Miroslav Dvořák	Czech Republic	+2:53	25:36.7	15	+2:56.8
29	35	Tino Edelmann	Germany	+2:43	25:52.0	22	+3:02.1
30	31	Taihei Kato	Japan	+2:27	26:11.0	28	+3:05.1
31	38	Seppi Hurschler	Switzerland	+2:59	25:44.9	20	+3:11.0
32	25	Jaakko Tallus	Finland	+2:05	26:51.1	38	+3:23.2
33	37	Tim Hug	Switzerland	+2:58	26:02.3	27	+3:27.4
34	20	Ales Vodsedalek	Czech Republic	+1:37	27:29.8	41	+3:33.9
35	19	Espen Rian	Norway	+1:31	27:41.8	42	+3:39.9
36	22	Sergey Maslennikov	Russia	+1:43	27:42.7	44	+3:52.8
37	32	Gašper Berlot	Slovenia	+2:31	26:57.9	39	+3:56.0
38	39	Maxime Laheurte	France	+3:08	26:24.2	33	+3:59.3
39	45	Mikko Kokslien	Norway	+4:11	25:23.9	12	+4:02.0
40	41	Eric Frenzel	Germany	+3:31	26:12.6	30	+4:10.7
41	33	Mitja Oranič	Slovenia	+2:34	27:42.1	43	+4:43.2
42	43	Volodymyr Trachuk	Ukraine	+3:53	26:25.2	34	+4:45.3
43	26	Niyaz Nabeev	Russia	+2:07	28:35.6	45	+5:09.7
44	42	Jason Myslicki	Canada	+3:51	27:02.4	40	+5:20.5
45	46	Taylor Fletcher	United States	+5:56	26:17.5	32	+6:40.6
	44	Anssi Koivuranta	Finland	+4:03			DNS
