= France at the 2006 Winter Olympics =

- IOC code: FRA
- NOC: French National Olympic and Sports Committee
- Website: www.franceolympique.com (in French)

in Turin
- Competitors: 82 (50 men, 32 women) in 10 sports
- Flag bearers: Bruno Mingeon (opening); Carole Montillet-Carles (closing)
- Medals Ranked 10th: Gold 3 Silver 2 Bronze 4 Total 9

Winter Olympics appearances (overview)
- 1924; 1928; 1932; 1936; 1948; 1952; 1956; 1960; 1964; 1968; 1972; 1976; 1980; 1984; 1988; 1992; 1994; 1998; 2002; 2006; 2010; 2014; 2018; 2022; 2026

France competed at the 2006 Winter Olympics in Turin, Italy. France is represented by the National Olympic Committee of France (French: Comité national olympique et sportif français).

== Medalists ==
Medal	Name	Sport	Event	Date
Gold	Antoine Dénériaz	Alpine skiing	Men's downhill	12 February
Gold	Florence Baverel-Robert	Biathlon	Women's sprint	16 February
Gold	Vincent Defrasne	Biathlon	Men's pursuit	18 February
Silver	Joël Chenal	Alpine skiing	Men's giant slalom	20 February
Silver	Roddy Darragon	Cross-country skiing	Men's sprint	22 February
Bronze	Sandra Laoura	Freestyle skiing	Women's moguls	11 February
Bronze	Paul-Henri de Le Rue	Snowboarding	Men's snowboard cross	16 February
Bronze	Julien Robert; Vincent Defrasne; Ferréol Cannard; Raphaël Poirée	Biathlon	Men's relay	21 February
Bronze	Delphyne Peretto; Florence Baverel-Robert; Sylvie Becaert; Sandrine Bailly	Biathlon	Women's relay	23 February

== Alpine skiing ==
Men

Athlete	Event	Final				
Athlete	Event	Run 1	Run 2	Run 3	Total	Rank
Yannick Bertrand	Downhill	n/a			1:51.37	24
Yannick Bertrand	Super-G	n/a			1:32.21	24
Pierrick Bourgeat	Slalom	54.45	51.03	n/a	1:45.48	11
Pierrick Bourgeat	Combined	1:41.35	45.56	44.38	3:11.29	8
Raphaël Burtin	Giant slalom	1:20.70	1:20.29	n/a	2:40.99	21
Joël Chenal	Giant slalom	1:16.80	1:18.27	n/a	2:35.07	Silver medal
Pierre-Emmanuel Dalcin	Downhill	n/a			1:50.35	11
Pierre-Emmanuel Dalcin	Super-G	did not finish				
Antoine Dénériaz	Downhill	n/a			1:48.80	Gold medal
Antoine Dénériaz	Super-G	n/a			1:31.49	11
Thomas Fanara	Giant slalom	did not finish				
Jean-Baptiste Grange	Slalom	54.84	did not finish			
Jean-Baptiste Grange	Combined	1:44.05	44.63	43.83	3:12.51	13
Gauthier de Tessières	Super-G	n/a			1:34.94	39
Gauthier de Tessières	Giant slalom	did not finish				
Stéphane Tissot	Slalom	did not finish				
Jean-Pierre Vidal	Slalom	did not start				

Women

Athlete	Event	Final				
Athlete	Event	Run 1	Run 2	Run 3	Total	Rank
Anne-Sophie Barthet	Slalom	46.28	50.38	n/a	1:36.66	24
Anne-Sophie Barthet	Combined	did not finish				
Ingrid Jacquemod	Downhill	n/a			1:58.46	16
Ingrid Jacquemod	Super-G	n/a			1:35.28	32
Ingrid Jacquemod	Giant slalom	1:02.56	1:11.49	n/a	2:14.05	21
Florine de Leymarie	Slalom	43.40	47.99	n/a	1:31.39	11
Marie Marchand-Arvier	Downhill	n/a			1:31.45	15
Marie Marchand-Arvier	Super-G	n/a			1:34.82	25
Marie Marchand-Arvier	Combined	41.04	44.62	n/a	1:31.45	15
Carole Montillet-Carles	Downhill	n/a			2:01.03	28
Carole Montillet-Carles	Super-G	n/a			1:33.31	5
Laure Pequegnot	Slalom	disqualified				
Vanessa Vidal	Slalom	44.49	48.48	n/a	1:32.97	26

Note: In the men's combined, run 1 is the downhill, and runs 2 and 3 are the slalom. In the women's combined, run 1 and 2 are the slalom, and run 3 the downhill.

== Biathlon ==
Men

Athlete	Event	Final		
Athlete	Event	Time	Misses	Rank
Ferréol Cannard	Sprint	28:19.7	1	32
Ferréol Cannard	Pursuit	40:07.71	6	40
Vincent Defrasne	Sprint	26:54.2	1	4
Vincent Defrasne	Pursuit	35:20.2	3	Gold medal
Vincent Defrasne	Mass start	48:20.7	4	11
Vincent Defrasne	Individual	59:16.1	6	34
Simon Fourcade	Individual	59:01.7	3	31
Raphaël Poirée	Sprint	27:19.0	1	8
Raphaël Poirée	Pursuit	did not finish		
Raphaël Poirée	Mass start	48:24.9	2	12
Raphaël Poirée	Individual	57:21.1	3	20
Julien Robert	Sprint	27:54.1	0	18
Julien Robert	Pursuit	37:15.95	1	10
Julien Robert	Mass start	48:51.8	2	16
Julien Robert	Individual	55:59.4	0	6
Julien Robert; Ferréol Cannard; Vincent Defrasne; Raphaël Poirée	Relay	1:22:35.1	6	Bronze medal

Women

Athlete	Event	Final		
Athlete	Event	Time	Misses	Rank
Sandrine Bailly	Sprint	22:43.0	2	6
Sandrine Bailly	Pursuit	39:39.47	3	12
Sandrine Bailly	Mass start	42:21.5	4	10
Sandrine Bailly	Individual	51:58.2	3	6
Florence Baverel-Robert	Sprint	22:31.4	0	Gold medal
Florence Baverel-Robert	Pursuit	39:57.62	4	13
Florence Baverel-Robert	Mass start	41:40.5	2	5
Florence Baverel-Robert	Individual	54:14.1	5	26
Sylvie Becaert	Sprint	24:12.9	0	30
Sylvie Becaert	Pursuit	43:17.10	3	34
Sylvie Becaert	Mass start	45:38.4	6	26
Sylvie Becaert	Individual	53:59.0	2	24
Delphyne Peretto	Sprint	23:31.2	0	14
Delphyne Peretto	Pursuit	41:52.85	3	26
Delphyne Peretto	Mass start	45:39.9	5	27
Delphyne Peretto	Individual	55:40.5	3	40
Delphyne Peretto; Florence Baverel-Robert; Sylvie Becaert; Sandrine Bailly	Relay	1:18:38.7	8	Bronze medal

== Bobsleigh ==
Athlete	Event	Final					
Athlete	Event	Run 1	Run 2	Run 3	Run 4	Total	Rank
Bruno Mingeon; Stéphane Galbert	Two-man	56.49	56.75	57.11	did not advance		21
Bruno Mingeon; Christophe Fouquet; Pierre-Alain Menneron; Alexandre Vanhoutte	Four-man	56.09	56.08	55.87	55.71	3:43.75	18

== Cross-country skiing ==
Distance

Athlete	Event	Final	
Athlete	Event	Total	Rank
Elodie Bourgeois Pin	Women's 10 km classical	29:40.6	22
Elodie Bourgeois Pin	Women's 30 km freestyle	1:29:37.6	36
Jean-Marc Gaillard	Men's 15 km classical	40:09.2	23
Jean-Marc Gaillard	Men's 50 km freestyle	2:06:19.9	11
Emmanuel Jonnier	Men's 30 km pursuit	did not finish	
Emmanuel Jonnier	Men's 50 km freestyle	2:06:13.5	4
Aurelie Perrillat Storti	Women's 10 km classical	30:35.9	37
Christophe Perrillat	Men's 15 km classical	40:12.0	24
Christophe Perrillat	Men's 30 km pursuit	1:20:12.0	35
Karine Philippot	Women's 15 km pursuit	45:06.5	20
Karine Philippot	Women's 30 km freestyle	1:24:06.1	11
Alexandre Rousselet	Men's 15 km classical	39:48.4	18
Alexandre Rousselet	Men's 30 km pursuit	1:19:17.0	27
Alexandre Rousselet	Men's 50 km freestyle	2:07:01.5	26
Vincent Vittoz	Men's 15 km classical	39:27.3	14
Vincent Vittoz	Men's 30 km pursuit	1:17:07.5	6
Vincent Vittoz	Men's 50 km freestyle	2:06:16.4	9
Christophe Perrillat; Alexandre Rousselet; Emmanuel Jonnier; Vincent Vittoz	Men's 4 x 10 km relay	1:44:22.8	4
Aurelie Perrillat Storti; Karine Philippot; Cécile Storti; Emilie Vina	Women's 4 x 5 km relay	56:41.4	9

Sprint

Athlete	Event	Qualifying		Quarterfinal		Semifinal		Final	
Athlete	Event	Total	Rank	Total	Rank	Total	Rank	Total	Rank
Elodie Bourgeois Pin	Women's sprint	2:24.77	55	Did not advance					55
Roddy Darragon	Men's sprint	2:16.76	10 Q	2:21.9	2 Q	2:19.9	2 Q	2:27.1	Silver medal
Aurelie Perrillat Storti	Women's sprint	2:19.28	34	Did not advance					34
Emilie Vina	Women's sprint	2:22.42	47	Did not advance					47
Elodie Bourgeois Pin; Aurelie Perrillat Storti	Women's team sprint	n/a				17:54.5	6	Did not advance	11

Jean-Marc Gaillard was suspended for health reasons for the first five days of competition after recording too high values of haemoglobin in his blood.

== Figure skating ==
Athlete	Event	CD		SP/OD		FS/FD		Total	
Athlete	Event	Points	Rank	Points	Rank	Points	Rank	Points	Rank
Frédéric Dambier	Men's	n/a		61.17	19 Q	116.42	19	177.59	19
Brian Joubert	Men's	n/a		77.77	4 Q	135.12	7	212.89	6
Marylin Pla; Yannick Bonheur	Pairs	n/a		44.24	14	88.60	14	132.84	14
Isabelle Delobel; Olivier Schoenfelder	Ice dance	36.44	7	58.34	4	99.50	2	194.28	4
Nathalie Péchalat; Fabian Bourzat	Ice dance	28.59	16	44.07	17	76.65	19	149.31	18

Key: CD = Compulsory Dance, FD = Free Dance, FS = Free Skate, OD = Original Dance, SP = Short Program

== Freestyle skiing ==
Athlete	Event	Qualifying		Final	
Athlete	Event	Points	Rank	Points	Rank
Guilbaut Colas	Men's moguls	24.33	5 Q	23.60	10
Sandra Laoura	Women's moguls	25.45	2 Q	25.37	Bronze medal
Aurélien Lohrer	Men's aerials	188.27	22	did not advance	22
Pierre Ochs	Men's moguls	23.19	14 Q	21.37	17
Silvan Palazot	Men's moguls	21.29	26	did not advance	26

== Nordic combined ==
Athlete	Event	Ski jumping		Cross-country		
Athlete	Event	Points	Rank	Deficit	Time	Rank
Nicolas Bal	Sprint	95.4	39	2:01	20:06.7 +1:37.7	27
Nicolas Bal	Individual Gundersen	188.5	42	4:56	44:28.9 +4:44.3	31
François Braud	Individual Gundersen	194.0	37	4:34	47:02.3 +7:17.7	42
Jason Lamy-Chappuis	Sprint	124.4	2	0:05	18:51.5 +0:22.5	4
Jason Lamy-Chappuis	Individual Gundersen	257.0	3	0:22	41:34.0 +1:49.4	31
Ludovic Roux	Sprint	did not start				
Ludovic Roux	Individual Gundersen	211.5	29	3:24	43:42.6 +3:58.0	26
François Braud; Nicolas Bal; Ludovic Roux; Jason Lamy-Chappuis	Team	848.2	6	1:05	51:24.6 +1:32.0	5

Note: "Deficit" refers to the amount of time behind the leader a competitor began the cross-country portion of the event. Italicized numbers show the final deficit from the winner's finishing time.

== Short track speed skating ==
Athlete	Event	Heat		Quarterfinal		Semifinal		Final	
Athlete	Event	Time	Rank	Time	Rank	Time	Rank	Time	Rank
Stéphanie Bouvier	Women's 500 m	disqualified							
Stéphanie Bouvier	Women's 1000 m	1:33.197	4	did not advance					20
Stéphanie Bouvier	Women's 1500 m	2:35.410	1 Q	n/a		disqualified			
Maxime Chataignier	Men's 1000 m	disqualified							
Maxime Chataignier	Men's 1500 m	2:23.966	4	did not advance					18
Min Kyung Choi	Women's 1000 m	1:36.745	2 Q	disqualified					
Myrtille Gollin	Women's 1500 m	2:38.442	did not advance						19
Jean-Charles Mattei	Men's 1000 m	1:28.009	3	did not advance					16
Jean-Charles Mattei	Men's 1500 m	2:43.543	5	did not advance					24
Stéphanie Bouvier; Min Kyung Choi; Myrtille Gollin; Céline Lecompére	Women's 3000 m relay	n/a				4:21.898	3	Final B 4:18.971	5

== Skeleton ==
Athlete	Event	Final			
Athlete	Event	Run 1	Run 2	Total	Rank
Philippe Cavoret	Men's	59.79	59.08	1:58.87	14

== Snowboarding ==
Halfpipe

Athlete	Event	Qualifying run 1		Qualifying run 2		Final		
Athlete	Event	Points	Rank	Points	Rank	Run 1	Run 2	Rank
Cecile Alzina	Women's halfpipe	25.7	17	28.0	13	did not advance		19
Mathieu Crépel	Men's halfpipe	37.4	8	34.2	11	did not advance		17
Sophie Rodriguez	Women's halfpipe	33.9	7	33.8	7	did not advance		13
Doriane Vidal	Women's halfpipe	34.5	6 Q	n/a		(26.1)	35.7	8
Gary Zebrowski	Men's halfpipe	30.7	17	43.3	2 Q	38.6	(29.5)	6

Note: In the final, the single best score from two runs is used to determine the ranking. A score in parentheses indicates a run that was not counted.

Parallel GS

Athlete	Event	Qualification		Round of 16	Quarterfinals	Semifinals	Finals	
Athlete	Event	Time	Rank	Opposition Time	Opposition Time	Opposition Time	Opposition Time	Rank
Isabelle Blanc	Women's parallel giant slalom	1:22.67	14	Pomagalski (FRA) (3); L +1.77 (-0.32 +2.09)	did not advance			14
Mathieu Bozzetto	Men's parallel giant slalom	1:12.02	13 Q	Prommegger (AUT) (4); W -0.54 (-0.48 -0.06)	Jaquet (SUI) (5); W -1.54 (-0.86 -0.68)	Schoch (SUI) (1); L +0.38 (-0.31 +0.69)	Bronze final Grabner (AUT) (9); L DNF	4
Nicolas Huet	Men's parallel giant slalom	1:10.72	7	Flander (SLO) (10); L +0.53 (+1.35 -0.82)	did not advance			10
Julie Pomagalski	Women's parallel giant slalom	1:21.02	3 Q	Blanc (FRA) (14); W -1.77 (+0.32 -2.09)	Meuli (SUI) (6); L -1.43 (-1.50 +0.07)	Classification 5–8; Bruhin (SUI) (7); W -4.76 (+1.50 -6.26)	5th place final Tudigescheva (RUS) (1); L +1.04 (+1.32 -0.28)	6

Key: "+ [time]" represents a deficit; the parentheses indicate the results of each run.

Snowboard cross

Athlete	Event	Qualifying		1/8 finals	Quarterfinals	Semifinals	Finals	
Athlete	Event	Time	Rank	Position	Position	Position	Position	Rank
Déborah Anthonioz	Women's snowboard cross	1:30.89	9 Q	n/a	3	did not advance	Classification 9–12; 2	10
Paul-Henri de Le Rue	Men's snowboard cross	1:21.21	10 Q	2 Q	2 Q	1 Q	3	Bronze medal
Xavier de Le Rue	Men's snowboard cross	1:20.97	5 Q	3	did not advance			18
Sylvain Duclos	Men's snowboard cross	1:22.55	25	4	did not advance			29
Marie Laissus	Women's snowboard cross	1:30.46	8 Q	n/a	2 Q	3	Classification 5–8; 4	8
Julie Pomagalski	Women's snowboard cross	1:36.32	23	did not advance				23
Karine Ruby	Women's snowboard cross	1:31.03	11 Q	n/a	4	did not advance	Classification 13–16; 4	16
Pierre Vaultier	Men's snowboard cross	1:23.75	35	did not advance				35
