= Slovenia at the 2006 Winter Olympics =

- IOC code: SLO
- NOC: Olympic Committee of Slovenia
- Website: www.olympic.si (in Slovene and English)

in Turin
- Competitors: 36 (23 men, 13 women) in 9 sports
- Flag bearers: Tadeja Brankovič (opening); Nejc Brodar (closing)
- Medals: Gold 0 Silver 0 Bronze 0 Total 0

Winter Olympics appearances (overview)
- 1992; 1994; 1998; 2002; 2006; 2010; 2014; 2018; 2022; 2026

Other related appearances
- Yugoslavia (1924–1988)

Slovenia competed at the 2006 Winter Olympics in Turin, Italy.

== Alpine skiing ==
Entering the Games, no Slovenian man was ranked in the top 20 of the World Cup standings in any alpine event, but they achieved several top-20 finishes in Turin, with the best a 12th place in the giant slalom from Mitja Valenčič. On the women's side, Tina Maze was ranked 5th in GS, but the top showing came from her team-mate Ana Drev, who posted one of the strongest second runs to end up 9th.

Men

Athlete	Event	Final				
Athlete	Event	Run 1	Run 2	Run 3	Total	Rank
Aleš Gorza	Super-G	n/a			1:33.77	33
Aleš Gorza	Giant slalom	did not finish				
Aleš Gorza	Slalom	did not finish				
Aleš Gorza	Combined	1:41.31	46.44	45.16	3:12.91	15
Drago Grubelnik	Slalom	54.87	50.82	n/a	1:45.69	13
Andrej Jerman	Downhill	n/a			1:51.70	28
Andrej Jerman	Super-G	n/a			1:33.20	28
Andrej Jerman	Combined	1:40.62	46.91	46.27	3:13.80	19
Andrej Šporn	Downhill	n/a			1:52.17	31
Andrej Šporn	Super-G	n/a			1:31.84	15
Andrej Šporn	Combined	1:39.67	46.20	57.66	3:23.53	30
Bernard Vajdič	Giant slalom	did not finish				
Bernard Vajdič	Slalom	55.16	51.27	n/a	1:46.43	19
Mitja Valenčič	Giant slalom	1:18.10	1:19.29	n/a	2:37.39	12
Mitja Valenčič	Slalom	did not finish				

Women

Athlete	Event	Final				
Athlete	Event	Run 1	Run 2	Run 3	Total	Rank
Ana Drev	Super-G	n/a			1:37.92	45
Ana Drev	Giant slalom	1:02.45	1:09.22	n/a	2:11.67	9
Ana Kobal	Slalom	44.36	48.53	n/a	1:32.89	25
Tina Maze	Super-G	n/a			1:36.64	39
Tina Maze	Giant slalom	1:01.97	1:09.86	n/a	2:11.83	12
Urška Rabič	Downhill	did not finish				
Urška Rabič	Super-G	n/a			1:34.12	18
Urška Rabič	Combined	40.61	did not finish			
Petra Robnik	Downhill	n/a			1:59.66	25
Petra Robnik	Super-G	n/a			1:35.10	29
Petra Robnik	Combined	40.54	44.84	1:32.02	2:57.40	21

== Biathlon ==
The Slovenian flagbearer, Tadeja Brankovič, contributed to the biathlon team's top finish in Turin, the 6th place earned by the women's relay. Teja Gregorin was the best individual performer, placing in the top-20 in all of her races. The best performance in the relay, however, came from neither Brankovič nor Gregorin, but from Dijana Grudiček, who pulled the team up as high as 5th.

Athlete	Event	Final		
Athlete	Event	Time	Misses	Rank
Klemen Bauer	Men's sprint	30:09.3	2	70
Klemen Bauer	Men's individual	1:02:25.5	5	60
Tadeja Brankovič	Women's sprint	24:14.1	2	31
Tadeja Brankovič	Women's pursuit	42:42.12	7	31
Tadeja Brankovič	Women's individual	55:38.9	6	39
Teja Gregorin	Women's sprint	23:31.2	0	14
Teja Gregorin	Women's pursuit	40:20.16	2	16
Teja Gregorin	Women's mass start	43:51.4	4	19
Teja Gregorin	Women's individual	53:03.7	3	18
Dijana Grudiček	Women's sprint	25:28.6	3	55
Dijana Grudiček	Women's pursuit	Lapped		
Dijana Grudiček	Women's individual	55:01.3	4	30
Andreja Mali	Women's sprint	26:02.5	3	59
Andreja Mali	Women's pursuit	Lapped		
Andreja Mali	Women's individual	53:46.0	1	21
Janez Marič	Men's sprint	28:28.6	3	37
Janez Marič	Men's pursuit	39:42.43	7	37
Janez Marič	Men's individual	59:53.0	5	40
Janez Ožbolt	Men's sprint	30:08.8	2	69
Janez Ožbolt	Men's individual	1:03:18.5	5	69
Matjaž Poklukar	Men's sprint	30:00.6	3	64
Matjaž Poklukar	Men's individual	1:00:07.6	3	47
Janez Marič; Janez Ožbolt; Klemen Bauer; Matjaž Poklukar	Men's relay	1:25:01.4	11	10
Teja Gregorin; Andreja Mali; Dijana Grudiček; Tadeja Brankovič	Women's relay	1:19:55.7	12	6

== Cross-country skiing ==
Petra Majdič was Slovenia's top cross-country skier in Turin, finishing 6th in the women's 10 km, and the only skier to proceed out of the qualifying rounds in the sprint. Majdič advanced to the semifinals, but placed 4th in her semi and in the B Final en route to an 8th place finish.

Distance

Athlete	Event	Final	
Athlete	Event	Total	Rank
Maja Benedičič	Women's 10 km classical	33:41.3	65
Maja Benedičič	Women's 15 km pursuit	46:51.1	39
Maja Benedičič	Women's 30 km freestyle	Did not finish	
Nejc Brodar	Men's 30 km pursuit	1:22:23.9	45
Nejc Brodar	Men's 50 km freestyle	2:07:24.5	31
Petra Majdič	Women's 10 km classical	28:22.3	6
Petra Majdič	Women's 15 km pursuit	43:41.7	11
Petra Majdič	Women's 30 km freestyle	1:25:22.5	14
Jože Mehle	Men's 15 km classical	42:56.9	59
Jože Mehle	Men's 30 km pursuit	1:24:13.6	55
Jože Mehle	Men's 50 km freestyle	2:13:37.1	55

Sprint

Athlete	Event	Qualifying		Quarterfinal		Semifinal		Final	
Athlete	Event	Total	Rank	Total	Rank	Total	Rank	Total	Rank
Nejc Brodar	Men's sprint	2:21.94	39	Did not advance					39
Vesna Fabjan	Women's sprint	2:20.34	40	Did not advance					40
Petra Majdič	Women's sprint	2:14.62	6 Q	2:17.7	2 Q	2:18.72	4	Final B 2:21.5	8
Jože Mehle	Men's sprint	2:27.02	56	Did not advance					56
Nejc Brodar; Jože Mehle	Men's team sprint	n/a				18:34.4	8	Did not advance	16
Maja Benedičič; Vesna Fabjan	Women's team sprint	n/a				18:59.5	7	Did not advance	14

== Figure skating ==
Urbas, who had placed 17th at the most recent European Championships, was second-to-last after the short program, and did not advance to compete in the free skate.

Athlete	Event	CD		SP/OD		FS/FD		Total	
Athlete	Event	Points	Rank	Points	Rank	Points	Rank	Points	Rank
Gregor Urbas	Men's	n/a		46.48	29	did not advance			29

Key: CD = Compulsory Dance, FD = Free Dance, FS = Free Skate, OD = Original Dance, SP = Short Program

== Freestyle skiing ==
Miha Gale was scheduled to compete, but pulled out after an injury in training, leaving Nina Bednarik as the only Slovenian freestyle skier competing in Turin.

Athlete	Event	Qualifying		Final	
Athlete	Event	Points	Rank	Points	Rank
Nina Bednarik	Women's moguls	19.54	24	did not advance	24
Miha Gale	Men's aerials	did not start			

== Luge ==
Domen Pociecha was the only Slovenian lugist in Turin. He was one of the weaker starters, but nonetheless managed to finish 26th, ahead of 10 other competitors.

Athlete	Event	Final					
Athlete	Event	Run 1	Run 2	Run 3	Run 4	Total	Rank
Domen Pociecha	Men's singles	53.141	53.073	53.039	53.072	3:32.325	26

== Nordic combined ==
Damjan Vtič competed in two events as the sole Slovenian Nordic combined athlete in Turin; his best finish was 34th in the sprint.

Athlete	Event	Ski jumping		Cross-country		
Athlete	Event	Points	Rank	Deficit	Time	Rank
Damjan Vtič	Sprint	107.8	17	1:12	20:35.9 +2:06.9	34
Damjan Vtič	Individual Gundersen	217.0	23	3:02	45:36.9 +5:52.3	40

Note: 'Deficit' refers to the amount of time behind the leader a competitor began the cross-country portion of the event. Italicized numbers show the final deficit from the winner's finishing time.

== Ski jumping ==
Slovenia was the defending Olympic and World bronze medalists in the team event, but struggled in Turin, finishing tenth, and not qualifying for the second round of jumps. Rok Benkovič, who was the defending world champion, in the normal hill event, had a very poor first jump in the final, ending up 49th. The best individual performance came from Jernej Damjan, who was 28th in the large hill event.

Athlete	Event	Qualifying		First round		Final		
Athlete	Event	Points	Rank	Points	Rank	Points	Total	Rank
Rok Benkovič	Normal hill	108.0	28 Q	91.5	49	did not advance		49
Rok Benkovič	Large hill	84.5	26 Q	99.9	22 Q	90.4	190.3	29
Jernej Damjan	Normal hill	114.5	21 Q	109.0	35	did not advance		35
Jernej Damjan	Large hill	105.9	7 Q	97.2	27 Q	95.0	192.2	28
Robert Kranjec	Normal hill	102.0	14 PQ	105.5	41	did not advance		41
Robert Kranjec	Large hill	106.7	13 Q	63.1	49	did not advance		49
Primož Peterka	Normal hill	117.0	16 Q	118.5	23 Q	96.5	215.0	30
Primož Peterka	Large hill	93.1	14 Q	92.0	34	did not advance		34
Rok Benkovič; Jernej Damjan; Robert Kranjec; Primož Peterka	Team	n/a		390.4	10	did not advance		10

Note: PQ indicates a skier was pre-qualified for the final, based on entry rankings.

== Snowboarding ==
Four snowboarders represented Slovenia in Turin, all in the parallel giant slalom. Two, Rok Flander and Dejan Kosir, qualified for the knockout stages, and advanced to the quarterfinals before losing to a Schoch brother, Flander to Philipp and Kosir to Simon. The two ended up 7th and 6th, respectively, after each faced two other Swiss racers in the consolation rounds.

Parallel GS

Athlete	Event	Qualification		Round of 16	Quarterfinals	Semifinals	Finals	
Athlete	Event	Time	Rank	Opposition Time	Opposition Time	Opposition Time	Opposition Time	Rank
Rok Flander	Men's parallel giant slalom	1:11.18	10 Q	Huet (FRA) (7); W -0.53 (-1.35 +0.82)	Schoch (SUI) (2); L +1.07 (+1.35 -0.28)	Classification 5-8; Inniger (SUI) (3); L +0.14 (-0.18 +0.32)	7th place Final; Jacquet (SUI) (5); W -0.41 (-0.12 -0.29)	7
Tomaž Knafelj	Men's parallel giant slalom	1:14.87	26	did not advance				26
Dejan Kosir	Men's parallel giant slalom	1:11.06	8 Q	Jewell (USA) (1); W -0.30 (+0.29 -0.59)	Schoch (SUI) (1); L +1.27 (+0.59 +0.68)	Classification 5-8; Jacquet (SUI) (5); W -4.55 (-0.85 +5.40)	5th place Final; Inniger (SUI) (3); L +0.42 (+0.94 -0.52)	6
Izidor Šušteršič	Men's parallel giant slalom	1:12.96	21	did not advance				21

Key: '+ Time' represents a deficit; the brackets indicate the results of each run.
