= Max Thompson (skier) =

Canadian Nordic combined skier (born 1984)

Max Thompson (born August 24, 1984 in Prince Albert, Saskatchewan) is a Canadian Nordic combined skier.

Thompson made his World Cup debut in January 2006 at Harrachov, Czech Republic. His best World Cup result to date also came at Harrachov, in 2007, when he finished 30th in the 10 kilometre Gundersen race.

Thompson has also competed in two World Championships, with his best performances being 41st places in the 2005 Gundersen and the 2007 sprint races.

Thompson competed at the 2006 Winter Olympics, in both the individual and sprint events. He finished 44th in the former and 46th in the latter.

Max Thompson was the team leader for both the 2010 winter Olympics in Vancouver, Canada and the 2012 Youth Olympics in Innsbruck, Austria where team Canada captured a bronze medal in the mixed team event.

He also coached all of the athletes of the bronze medal team of the 2022 Beijing Olympics.
