= Yevgeny Brailovsky =

Russian freestyle skier (born 1984)

Personal information
- Nationality: Russian
- Born: 2 January 1984 (age 41); Tashkent, Uzbekistan

Sport
- Sport: Freestyle skiing

Yevgeny Brailovsky (born 2 January 1984) is a Russian freestyle skier. He competed in the men's aerials event at the 2006 Winter Olympics.
