= Anton Kamenev =

Russian Nordic combined skier

Personal information
- Nationality: Russian
- Born: 15 January 1986 (age 39); Moscow, Russia

Sport
- Sport: Nordic combined

Anton Kamenev (born 15 January 1986) is a Russian skier. He competed in the Nordic combined team event at the 2006 Winter Olympics.
