= Freestyle skiing at the 2006 Winter Olympics – Men's aerials =

Men's aerials at the XX Olympic Winter Games
- Pictogram for freestyle skiing
- Venue: Sauze d'Oulx
- Dates: 20 February (qualification); 23 February (final)
- Competitors: 31 from 12 nations
- Winning score: 250.77

Medalists
1st place, gold medalist(s)		Han Xiaopeng	China
2nd place, silver medalist(s)		Dmitri Dashinski	Belarus
3rd place, bronze medalist(s)		Vladimir Lebedev	Russia

The Men's aerials event in freestyle skiing at the 2006 Winter Olympics in Turin, Italy began on 20 February and concluded on 23 February at Sauze d'Oulx.

== Results ==
=== Qualification ===
The qualification round took place on the afternoon of 15 February, with 31 skiers competing, though three did not start. The top 12 advanced to the final.

Rank	Name	Country	Jump 1	Jump 2	Total	Notes
1	Han Xiaopeng	China	128.54	121.91	250.45	Q
2	Dmitri Dashinski	Belarus	130.31	119.03	249.34	Q
3	Warren Shouldice	Canada	123.01	120.44	243.45	Q
4	Alexei Grishin	Belarus	115.43	127.44	242.87	Q
5	Vladimir Lebedev	Russia	120.24	121.24	241.48	Q
6	Qiu Sen	China	129.21	107.29	236.50	Q
7	Kyle Nissen	Canada	128.10	103.54	231.64	Q
8	Jeret Peterson	United States	114.38	112.83	227.21	Q
9	Enver Ablaev	Ukraine	111.47	115.42	226.89	Q
10	Anton Kushnir	Belarus	121.24	105.09	226.33	Q
11	Renato Ulrich	Switzerland	114.38	111.37	225.75	Q
12	Yevgeny Brailovsky	Russia	113.14	109.14	222.28	Q
13	Stanislav Kravchuk	Ukraine	102.88	118.81	221.69	
14	Thomas Lambert	Switzerland	113.57	101.20	214.77	
15	Joe Pack	United States	97.57	113.76	211.33	
16	Ryan St. Onge	United States	97.35	110.40	207.75	
17	Eric Bergoust	United States	113.72	92.13	205.85	
18	Liu Zhongqing	China	113.80	87.46	201.26	
19	Jeff Bean	Canada	117.92	80.57	198.49	
20	Steve Omischl	Canada	124.78	73.45	198.23	
21	Aleš Valenta	Czech Republic	105.97	87.61	193.58	
22	Aurélien Lohrer	France	87.83	100.44	188.27	
23	Ou Xiaotao	China	72.12	108.19	180.31	
24	Dmitri Rak	Belarus	86.63	85.84	172.47	
25	Ken Mizuno	Japan	90.04	67.63	157.67	
26	Igor Ishutko	Ukraine	47.34	105.70	153.04	
27	Oleksandr Abramenko	Ukraine	63.05	86.42	149.47	
28	Clyde Getty	Argentina	47.56	32.32	79.88	
	Dmitry Marushchak	Russia	DNS			
	Dmitry Arkhipov	Russia	DNS			
	Miha Gale	Slovenia	DNS			

=== Final ===
The final took place on the evening of 23 February, with Han Xiaopeng's second jump, a back-layout double-full full, putting him past Belarus's Dmitri Dashinski, into the gold medal spot.

Rank	Athlete	Jump 1	Jump 2	Total
Gold medal	Han Xiaopeng (CHN)	130.53	120.24	250.77
Silver medal	Dmitri Dashinski (BLR)	131.42	117.26	248.68
Bronze medal	Vladimir Lebedev (RUS)	120.65	126.11	246.76
4	Alexei Grishin (BLR)	123.90	121.28	245.18
5	Kyle Nissen (CAN)	114.38	130.53	244.91
6	Warren Shouldice (CAN)	123.45	116.25	239.70
7	Jeret Peterson (USA)	124.78	112.70	237.48
8	Anton Kushnir (BLR)	124.56	103.10	227.66
9	Evgeniy Brailovskiy (RUS)	110.01	113.60	223.61
10	Renato Ulrich (SUI)	105.53	99.22	204.75
11	Qiu Sen (CHN)	98.89	87.67	186.56
12	Enver Ablaev (UKR)	61.79	88.69	150.48
