= Biathlon at the 2006 Winter Olympics – Men's mass start =

Men's biathlon mass start at the XX Olympic Winter Games
- Venue: Cesana San Sicario
- Dates: 25 February 2006
- Competitors: 30 from 14 nations
- Winning time: 47:20.0

Medalists
1st place, gold medalist(s)		Michael Greis	Germany
2nd place, silver medalist(s)		Tomasz Sikora	Poland
3rd place, bronze medalist(s)		Ole Einar Bjørndalen	Norway

The Men's 15 kilometre biathlon mass start competition at the 2006 Winter Olympics in Turin, Italy was held on 25 February, at Cesana San Sicario. Competitors raced over five loops of a 3.0 kilometre skiing course, shooting twenty times, ten prone and ten standing. Each miss required a competitor to ski a 150-metre penalty loop.

Only thirty athletes competed in the mass start, which was making its Olympic debut. Ole Einar Bjørndalen was defending World Champion, but was tenth in the overall World Cup, which was led by France's Raphaël Poirée. Tomasz Sikora's silver medal finish was the first biathlon medal ever for Poland, men's or women's.

== Results ==
The race was held at 10:00.

Rank	Bib	Name	Country	Time	Penalties (P+P+S+S)	Deficit
1st place, gold medalist(s)	1	Michael Greis	Germany	47:20.0	1 (0+0+1+0)	–
2nd place, silver medalist(s)	12	Tomasz Sikora	Poland	47:26.3	1 (0+0+0+1)	+6.3
3rd place, bronze medalist(s)	4	Ole Einar Bjørndalen	Norway	47:32.3	3 (0+0+1+2)	+12.3
4	27	Paavo Puurunen	Finland	47:43.7	0 (0+0+0+0)	+23.7
5	11	Sergei Tchepikov	Russia	47:59.1	0 (0+0+0+0)	+39.1
6	18	Emil Hegle Svendsen	Norway	48:13.8	2 (0+1+0+1)	+53.8
7	5	Halvard Hanevold	Norway	48:14.9	3 (1+0+1+1)	+54.9
8	10	Alexander Wolf	Germany	48:15.3	2 (0+0+1+1)	+55.3
9	15	Christoph Sumann	Austria	48:17.4	2 (1+0+0+1)	+57.4
10	8	Michael Rösch	Germany	48:19.9	3 (1+0+1+1)	+59.9
11	3	Vincent Defrasne	France	48:20.7	4 (0+1+1+2)	+1:00.7
12	7	Raphaël Poirée	France	48:24.9	2 (1+1+0+0)	+1:04.9
13	29	Jay Hakkinen	United States	48:29.6	1 (0+0+1+0)	+1:09.6
14	25	Mattias Nilsson	Sweden	48:37.7	1 (1+0+0+0)	+1:17.7
15	9	Maxim Tchoudov	Russia	48:40.2	4 (1+0+1+2)	+1:20.2
16	16	Julien Robert	France	48:51.8	2 (0+1+1+0)	+1:31.8
17	2	Sven Fischer	Germany	48:53.7	2 (0+1+0+1)	+1:33.7
18	17	Björn Ferry	Sweden	48:56.4	2 (0+1+1+0)	+1:36.4
19	6	Frode Andresen	Norway	49:03.6	6 (0+2+2+2)	+1:43.6
20	20	Sergei Rozhkov	Russia	49:09.7	2 (0+0+1+1)	+1:49.7
21	14	Nikolay Kruglov, Jr.	Russia	49:20.1	2 (1+0+1+0)	+2:00.1
22	24	Zdeněk Vítek	Czech Republic	49:21.3	2 (0+0+1+1)	+2:01.3
23	21	Roman Dostál	Czech Republic	49:29.9	4 (0+0+2+2)	+2:09.9
24	23	Wilfried Pallhuber	Italy	49:41.5	2 (2+0+0+0)	+2:21.5
25	28	Rene Laurent Vuillermoz	Italy	49:53.1	4 (2+0+1+1)	+2:33.1
26	22	Christian De Lorenzi	Italy	49:59.6	4 (2+1+0+1)	+2:39.6
27	26	Marek Matiaško	Slovakia	50:11.1	3 (0+0+1+2)	+2:51.1
28	13	Ilmārs Bricis	Latvia	50:27.6	3 (0+0+1+2)	+3:07.6
29	19	Carl Johan Bergman	Sweden	50:54.4	4 (2+1+0+1)	+3:34.4
30	30	Kyoji Suga	Japan	52:01.6	5 (1+0+3+1)	+4:41.6
