= Biathlon at the 2006 Winter Olympics – Women's mass start =

Women's biathlon mass start at the XX Olympic Winter Games
- Venue: Cesana San Sicario
- Dates: 25 February 2006
- Competitors: 30 from 14 nations
- Winning time: 40:36.5

Medalists
1st place, gold medalist(s)		Anna Carin Olofsson	Sweden
2nd place, silver medalist(s)		Kati Wilhelm	Germany
3rd place, bronze medalist(s)		Uschi Disl	Germany

The Women's 12.5 kilometre biathlon mass start competition at the 2006 Winter Olympics in Turin, Italy was held on 25 February, at Cesana San Sicario. Competitors raced over five loops of a 2.5 kilometre skiing course, shooting twenty times, ten prone and ten standing. Each miss required a competitor to ski a 150-metre penalty loop.

Germany's Martina Glagow led the World Cup standings before the Olympics, while Norway's Gro Marit Istad Kristiansen was the reigning World Champion at the event.

== Results ==
The race was held at 12:00.

Rank	Bib	Name	Country	Time	Penalties (P+P+S+S)	Deficit
1st place, gold medalist(s)	5	Anna Carin Olofsson	Sweden	40:36.5	1 (0+0+0+1)	—
2nd place, silver medalist(s)	3	Kati Wilhelm	Germany	40:55.3	1 (0+0+1+0)	+18.8
3rd place, bronze medalist(s)	8	Uschi Disl	Germany	41:18.4	3 (1+0+1+1)	+41.9
4	4	Martina Glagow	Germany	41:33.6	2 (1+0+1+0)	+57.1
5	2	Florence Baverel-Robert	France	41:40.5	2 (1+1+0+0)	+1:04.0
6	14	Olga Nazarova	Belarus	41:50.5	1 (0+0+1+0)	+1:14.0
7	16	Liu Xianying	China	41:57.2	2 (0+0+1+1)	+1:20.7
8	21	Ekaterina Dafovska	Bulgaria	42:09.4	3 (1+1+0+1)	+1:32.9
9	6	Albina Akhatova	Russia	42:19.5	2 (2+0+0+0)	+1:43.0
10	9	Sandrine Bailly	France	42:21.5	4 (0+1+2+1)	+1:45.0
11	19	Michela Ponza	Italy	42:21.6	1 (0+1+0+0)	+1:45.1
12	1	Svetlana Ishmouratova	Russia	42:33.5	4 (2+0+2+0)	+1:57.0
13	12	Andrea Henkel	Germany	42:41.5	3 (1+0+2+0)	+2:05.0
14	13	Linda Tjørhom	Norway	42:46.5	3 (0+0+2+1)	+2:10.0
15	10	Olga Zaitseva	Russia	42:58.3	1 (0+0+1+0)	+2:21.8
16	15	Olena Zubrilova	Belarus	43:12.3	4 (2+0+0+2)	+2:35.8
17	7	Lilia Efremova	Ukraine	43:21.0	6 (1+2+2+1)	+2:44.5
18	11	Liv Grete Poirée	Norway	43:43.8	4 (1+0+2+1)	+3:07.3
19	20	Teja Gregorin	Slovenia	43:51.4	4 (1+2+0+1)	+3:14.9
20	25	Madara Liduma	Latvia	43:52.7	5 (1+2+1+1)	+3:16.2
21	26	Natalia Levtchenkova	Moldova	44:21.8	2 (1+1+0+0)	+3:45.3
22	30	Sun Ribo	China	44:29.3	7 (2+2+3+0)	+3:52.8
23	27	Kong Yingchao	China	44:45.0	3 (2+1+0+0)	+4:08.5
24	18	Natalia Guseva	Russia	44:55.1	5 (2+3+0+0)	+4:18.6
25	24	Tora Berger	Norway	45:23.2	3 (1+1+1+0)	+4:46.7
26	22	Sylvie Becaert	France	45:38.4	6 (1+1+2+2)	+5:01.9
27	28	Delphyne Peretto	France	45:39.9	5 (3+0+0+2)	+5:03.4
28	17	Hou Yuxia	China	45:40.1	10 (3+1+2+4)	+5:03.6
29	29	Magdalena Gwizdon	Poland	45:59.5	5 (0+2+2+1)	+5:23.0
30	23	Krystyna Pałka	Poland	46:31.5	3 (1+2+0+0)	+5:55.0
