= Roman Yazvinskyy =

Ukrainian luger (born 1986)

Roman Yazvinskyy (born 30 November 1986) is a Ukrainian luger who competed in the mid-2000s. He competed in the men's doubles event at the 2006 Winter Olympics in Turin, but crashed out toward the end of the first run. Yazvinskyy was sent to a hospital with an unspecified head injury. He is a native of Lviv.
