= Goro Hayashibe =

Japanese luger (born 1976)

Goro Hayashibe (林部吾郎, Hayashibe Gorō, born May 21, 1976) is a Japanese luger who has competed since 1996. He finished 12th in the men's doubles event at the 2006 Winter Olympics in Turin.

Hayashibe's best finish at the FIL World Luge Championships was eighth in the mixed team event at Park City, Utah in 2005.
