= Oleg Zherebetskyy =

Ukrainian luger (born 1986)

Oleg Zherbetskyy (born 15 August 1986) is a Ukrainian luger who has competed since 2003. He competed in the men's doubles event at the 2006 Winter Olympics in Turin by completing the first run of the event, but not starting the second run to a severe crash at the end of the first run.

Zherbetskyy finished 20th in the men's doubles event at the 2007 FIL World Luge Championships in Igls.
