= Masaki Toshiro =

Japanese luger (born 1980)

Masaki Toshiro (戸城 正貴, Toshiro Masaki) (born April 13, 1980) is a Japanese luger who has competed since 2000. He finished 12th in the men's doubles event at the 2006 Winter Olympics in Turin.

Toshiro's best finish at the FIL World Luge Championships was eighth in the mixed team event at Park City, Utah in 2005.
