= Ken Mizuno =

Japanese freestyle skier (born 1978)

Personal information
- Nationality: Japanese
- Born: 23 May 1978 (age 46); Takaoka, Japan

Sport
- Sport: Freestyle skiing

Ken Mizuno (水野 剣, Mizuno Ken, born 23 May 1978) is a Japanese freestyle skier. He competed in the men's aerials event at the 2006 Winter Olympics.
