= Aurélien Lohrer =

French freestyle skier

Personal information
- Nationality: French
- Born: 28 April 1981 (age 44); Grenoble, France

Sport
- Sport: Freestyle skiing

Aurélien Lohrer (born 28 April 1981) is a French freestyle skier. He competed in the men's aerials event at the 2006 Winter Olympics.
