= Patrik Chlum =

Czech Nordic combined skier

Personal information
- Nationality: Czech
- Born: 1 December 1981 (age 43); Jablonec nad Nisou, Czechoslovakia

Sport
- Sport: Nordic combined

Patrik Chlum (born 1 December 1981) is a Czech skier. He competed in the Nordic combined event at the 2006 Winter Olympics.
