= Carl Van Loan =

American former Nordic combined skier (born 1980)

Carl Van Loan (born 20 August 1980) is an American former Nordic combined skier who competed in the 2006 Winter Olympics.
