= Dijana Ravnikar =

Slovenian biathlete

Dijana Ravnikar (née Grudiček; born 4 June 1978 in Rijeka, SFR Yugoslavia) is a former Slovenian biathlete and cross-country skier of Croatian origin.

== Career ==
Ravnikar competed for Slovenia in the 2002 Winter Olympics in Salt Lake City, 2006 Winter Olympics in Turin and 2010 Winter Olympics in Vancouver.

In Salt Lake City he competed in the 15 km, winning 57th place and in the 4 x 7.5 km relay, where the Slovenian team came 6th.

In Turin, she performed in several disciplines. In the 7.5 km sprint she took 55th place, in 10-kilometer course she withdrew; in the 15 km she finished 30th, while in the 4 x 6 km relay, the Slovenian team was sixth.

She retired after the 2009–10 season, though she had a short-lived comeback during the 2012–13 season.

== Personal life ==
She currently resides in Koper and Čavle.
