= Igor Ishutko =

Ukrainian freestyle skier

Personal information
- Nationality: Ukrainian
- Born: 30 January 1983 (age 42); Mykolaiv, Ukraine

Sport
- Sport: Freestyle skiing

Igor Ishutko (born 30 January 1983) is a Ukrainian freestyle skier. He competed in the men's aerials event at the 2006 Winter Olympics.
