= Antti Kuisma =

Finnish Nordic combined skier

Personal information
- Full name: Antti Sakari Kuisma
- Born: 23 February 1978 (age 48) Jyväskylä, Finland
- Height: 188 cm (6 ft 2 in)
- Weight: 80 kg (176 lb)
Medal record
Men's Nordic combined
Representing Finland
Olympic Games
Bronze medal – third place	2006 Turin	4 x 5 km team

Antti Sakari Kuisma (born 23 February 1978 in Jyväskylä) is a Nordic combined athlete from Finland who won a bronze medal at the 2006 Winter Olympics in the 4 x 5 km team event. He finished 17th in the 15 km individual event at those same games.

His best finish at the FIS Nordic World Ski Championships was fifth in the 15 km individual at Oberstdorf in 2005.

Kuisma competed from 2000 to 2008.
