= Aleksei Barannikov (skier) =

Russian Nordic combined skier

Personal information
- Nationality: Russian
- Born: 13 May 1975 (age 49); Moscow, Russia

Sport
- Sport: Nordic combined

Aleksei Barannikov (born 13 May 1975) is a Russian skier. He competed in the Nordic combineds at the 2002 Winter Olympics and the 2006 Winter Olympics.
