= Jochen Strobl =

Italian Nordic combined skier

Personal information
- Nationality: Italian
- Born: 24 February 1979 (age 46); San Candido, Italy

Sport
- Sport: Nordic combined

Jochen Strobl (born 24 February 1979) is an Italian skier. He competed in the Nordic combined event at the 2006 Winter Olympics.
