= Ivan Fesenko (skier) =

Russian Nordic combined skier

Personal information
- Nationality: Russian
- Born: 22 August 1981 (age 43); Berezniki, Russia

Sport
- Sport: Nordic combined

Ivan Fesenko (born 22 August 1981) is a Russian skier. He competed in the Nordic combined event at the 2006 Winter Olympics.
