= Dmitry Matveyev (skier) =

Russian Nordic combined skier

Personal information
- Nationality: Russian
- Born: 25 December 1984 (age 41) Leningrad, Russian SFSR, Soviet Union

Sport
- Sport: Nordic combined

Dmitry Sergeyevich Matveyev (Russian: Дми́трий Серге́евич Матве́ев; born 25 December 1984) is a Russian skier. He competed in the Nordic combined event at the 2006 Winter Olympics.
