= Ladislav Rygl Jr. =

Czech Nordic combined skier (born 1976)

Ladislav Rygl Jr. (born 15 May 1976 in Vrchlabí) is a Czech Nordic combined skier who competed from 1995 to 2006. Competing in three Winter Olympics, he had his best overall finish of eighth in the 4 x 5 km team event at Nagano in 1998 and his best individual finish of 17th in the 7.5 km sprint event at Turin in 2006.

Rygl's best finish at the FIS Nordic World Ski Championships was sixth in the 15 km individual event at Lahti in 2001. He earned three World Cup victories, one in a 7.5 km sprint and the others in the 15 km individual events in 1999 and 2000. In total he had 13 world cup podium finishes.

Rygl is the son of Ladislav Rygl Sr., winner of the Nordic combined event at the 1970 FIS Nordic World Ski Championships in Vysoké Tatry.
