= Damjan Vtič =

Slovenian Nordic combined skier

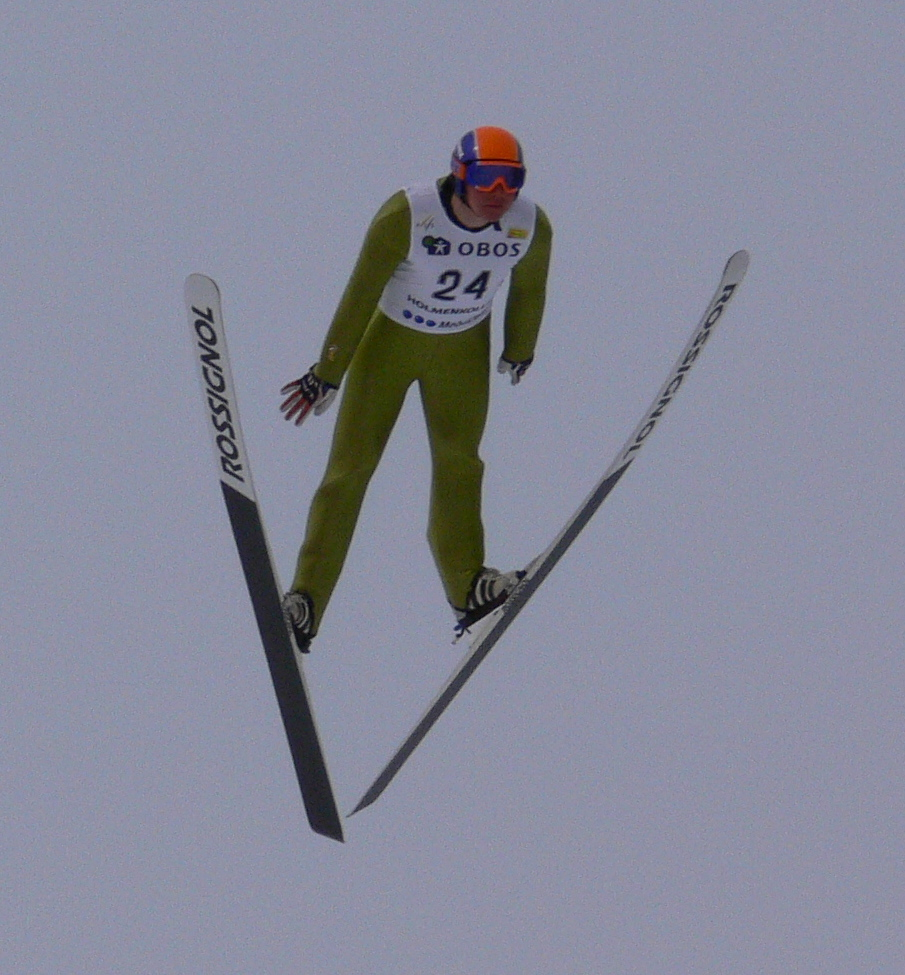
- Damjan Vtič in 2006.

Personal information
- Nationality: Slovenian
- Born: 13 May 1985 (age 39); Trebnje, Yugoslavia

Sport
- Sport: Nordic combined

Damjan Vtič (born 13 May 1985) is a Slovenian skier. He competed in the Nordic combined event at the 2006 Winter Olympics.
