= Ivan Rieder =

Swiss Nordic combined skier

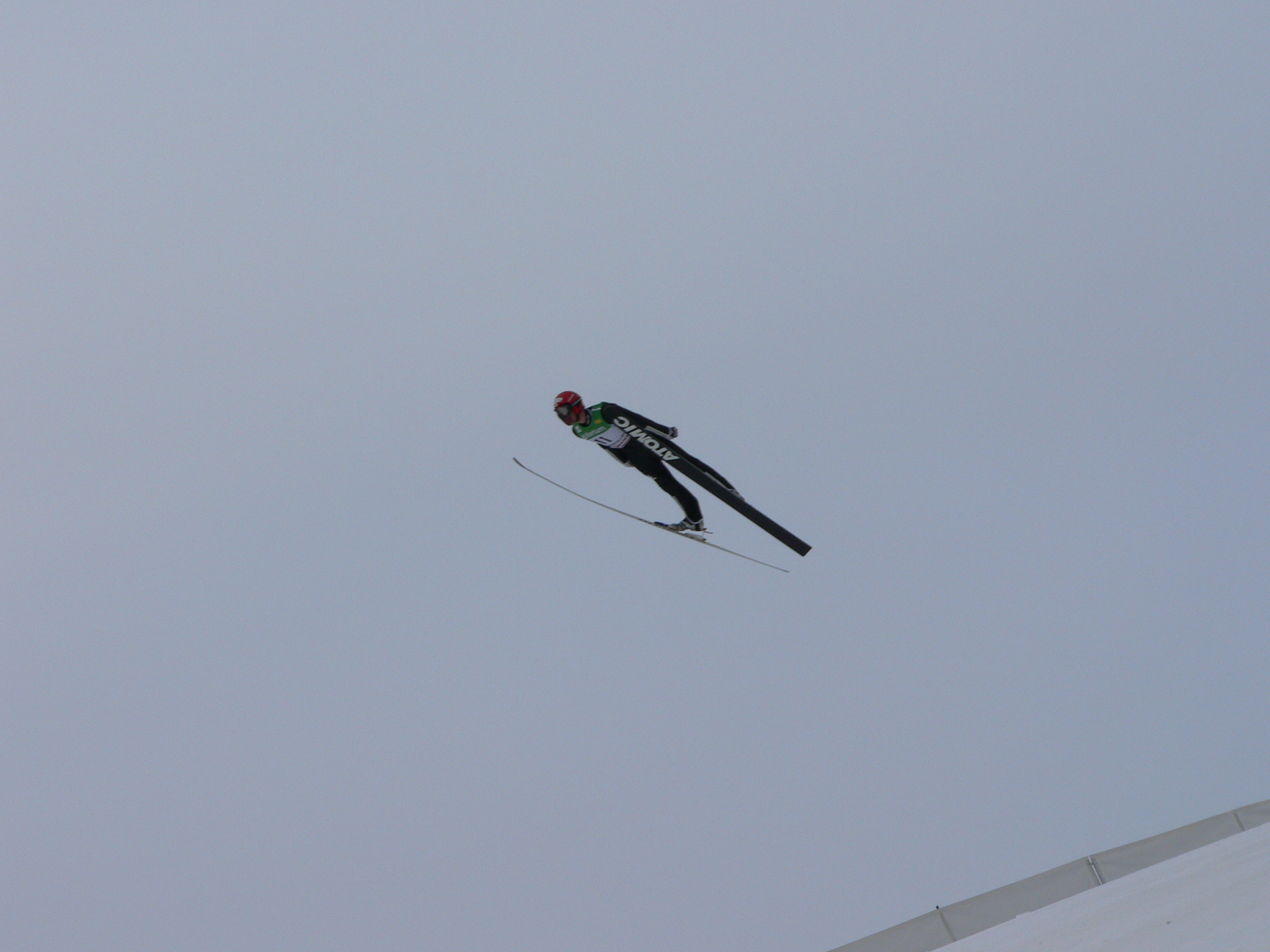
Ivan Rieder (4449509151).

Ivan Rieder (born 3 December 1976 in Thun, Canton of Bern) is a retired Swiss Nordic combined skier who has been competing since 1999. He finished fifth in the 4 x 5 km team event at the 2007 FIS Nordic World Ski Championships in Sapporo and earned his best finish of 30th in the 7.5 km sprint at those same championships.

Reider's best individual finish at the Winter Olympics was 27th in the 15 km individual event at Turin in 2006.

He has three individual career victories, all in World Cup B events since 2003, two in the 7.5 km sprint and one in the 15 km individual events. Rieder's best individual World Cup finish was fifth in a 7.5 km sprint event in Austria in 2005.
