= Daniele Munari =

Italian Nordic combined skier

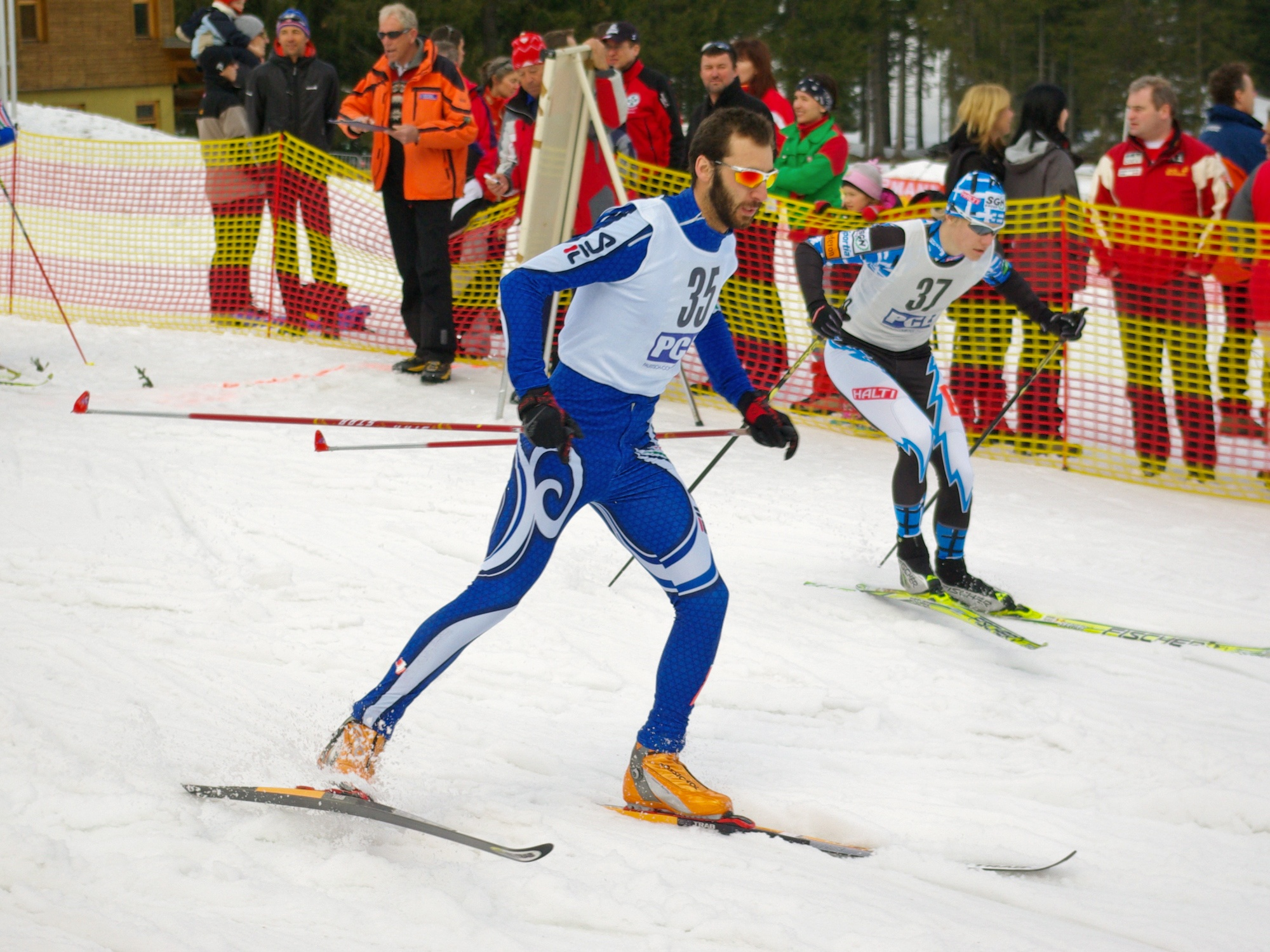
- Daniele Munari in 2008

Personal information
- Nationality: Italian
- Born: 16 June 1983 (age 43) Asiago, Italy

Sport
- Sport: Nordic combined

Daniele Munari (born 16 June 1983) is an Italian skier. He competed in the Nordic combined event at the 2006 Winter Olympics.
