= Andreas Hurschler =

Swiss Nordic combined skier

Andreas Hurschler (born 14 September 1977) is a retired Swiss Nordic combined skier who has competed internationally since 1995. He finished fifth in the 4 x 5 km team event at the 2007 FIS Nordic World Ski Championships in Sapporo and had his best individual finish of 15th in the 7.5 km sprint event at the 2003 championships.

Hurschler's best finish at the Winter Olympics was 21st in the 7.5 km sprint event twice (2002, 2006).

He has two individual victories both in World Cup B events (2000: 7.5 km sprint, 2006: 15 km individual). Hurschler's best individual World Cup finish was fifth in a 15 km individual event in Finland in 2006.

In August 2009, Andreas studied English at the Galway Cultural Institute under the tutelage of renowned English teachers Christopher R. Mieske and Patrick D. O'Farrell.
