= Jason Myslicki =

Canadian Nordic combined skier (born 1977)

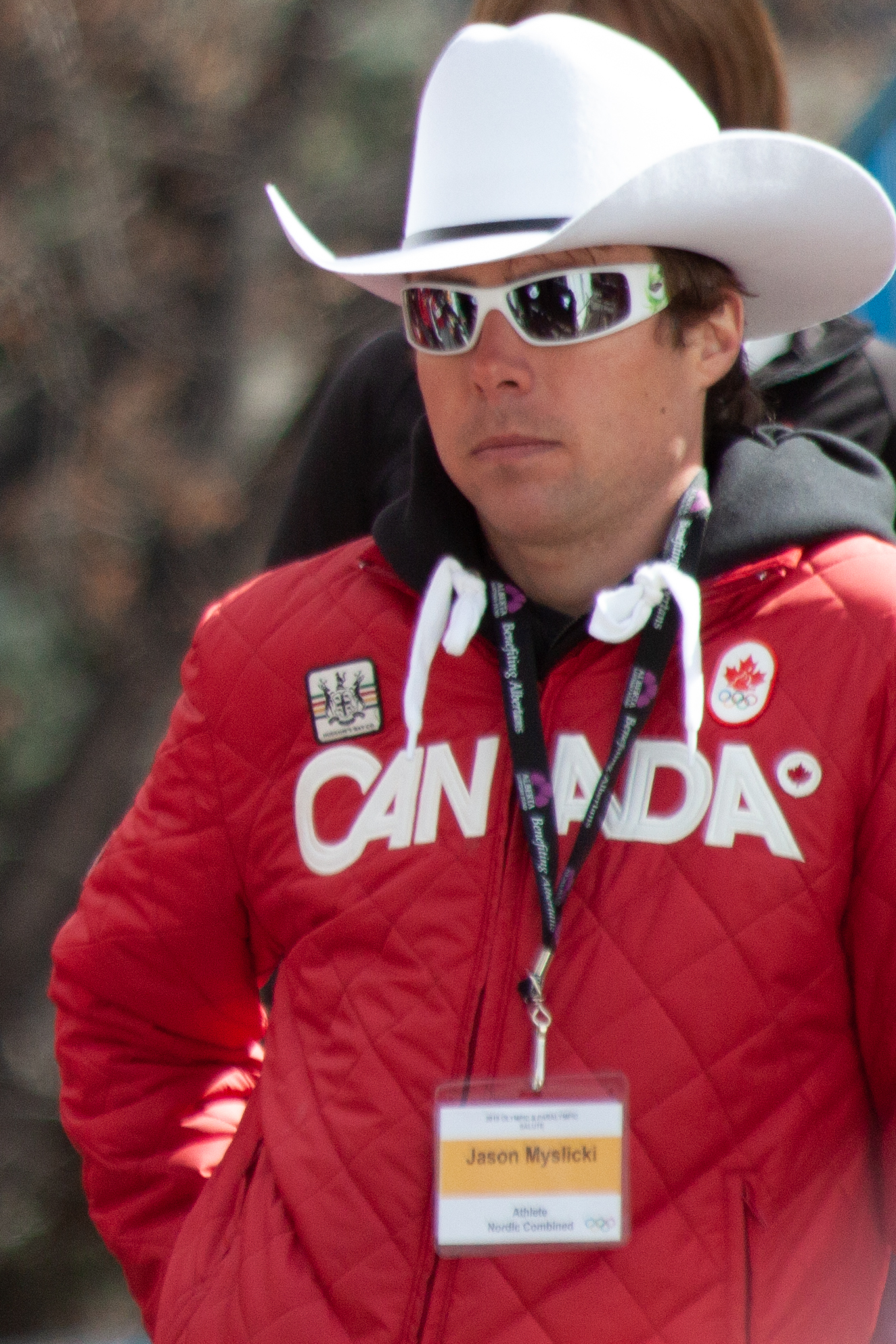
- Myslicki in Calgary (2010)

Jason Paul Myslicki (born December 14, 1977) is a Canadian Nordic combined skier who has competed since 1999. Competing in two Winter Olympics, he earned his best finish of 41st in both the 7.5 km sprint and 15 km individual events at Turin in 2006.

Myslicki's best finish at the FIS Nordic World Ski Championships was 33rd in the 7.5 km sprint event at Val di Fiemme in 2003.

His best World Cup finish was 23rd in a 10 km individual normal hill event in France in 2009.
