= Takashi Kitamura =

Japanese Nordic combined skier

Personal information
- Nationality: Japanese
- Born: 15 May 1977 (age 47); Niigata, Japan

Sport
- Sport: Nordic combined

Takashi Kitamura (born 15 May 1977) is a Japanese skier. He competed in the Nordic combined event at the 2006 Winter Olympics.
