= Sergei Diyachuk =

Ukrainian Nordic combined skier

Personal information
- Nationality: Ukrainian
- Born: 4 September 1980 (age 44); Kremenets, Ukraine

Sport
- Sport: Nordic combined

Sergei Diyachuk (born 4 September 1980) is a Ukrainian skier. He competed in the Nordic combined event at the 2006 Winter Olympics.
