= Nicolas Bal =

French Nordic combined skier

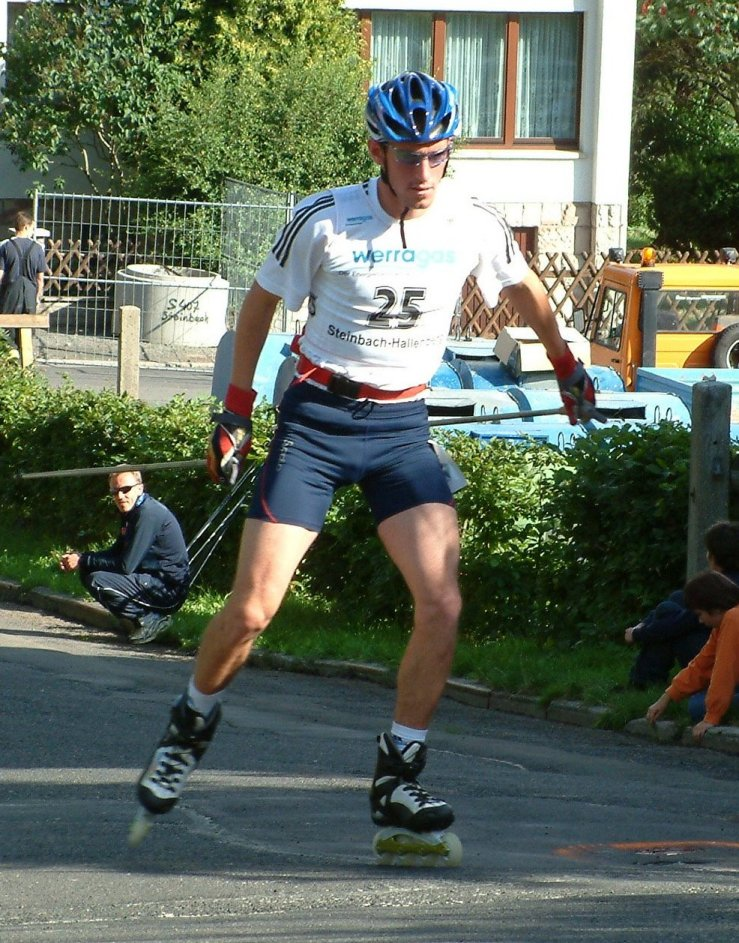

Medal record

Men's Nordic combined

Representing France

Olympic Games
Bronze medal – third place	1998 Nagano	4 x 5 km team

Nicholas Bal (born 2 June 1978) is a former French Nordic combined skier who competed from 1996 to 2007. At the 1998 Winter Olympics in Nagano he won a bronze in the 4 x 5 km team event.
