= Tomáš Slavík =

Czech Nordic combined skier (born 1981)

Tomáš Slavík (Czech pronunciation: [ˈtomaːʃ ˈslaviːk]; born 29 April 1981 in Jilemnice) is a Czech Nordic combined skier who has competed since 2002. Competing in two Winter Olympics, he earned his best finish of eighth twice (4 x 5 km team: 2006, 2010) while earning his best individual finish of 20th in the 10 km individual normal hill event at Vancouver in 2010.

Slavík's best finish at the FIS Nordic World Ski Championships was sixth in the 4 x 5 km team event at Liberec in 2009 while his best individual finish was 27th twice (7.5 km sprint: 2007, 15 km individual: 2005).

His best World Cup finish was fifth in a 10 km individual large hill event at Germany in 2009.
