= Volodymyr Trachuk =

Ukrainian Nordic combined skier (born 1985)

Volodymyr Trachuk (born 3 January 1985) is a Ukrainian Nordic combined skier who has competed since 2004. Competing in two Winter Olympics, he earned his best finish of 41st in the 10 km individual normal hill event at Vancouver in 2010.

Trachuk's best finish at the FIS Nordic World Ski Championships was 36th in the 10 km individual normal hill event at Liberec in 2009.

His best World Cup finish was 18th in a 10 km individual normal hill event at Seefeld in Tirol (Austria) in 2009.
