= Ronny Heer =

Swiss Nordic combined skier

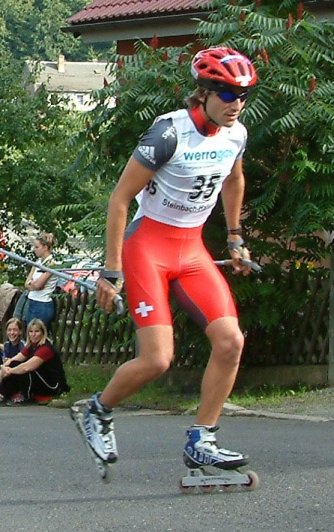
Ronny Heer in 2004.

Ronny Heer (born 9 January 1981) is a Swiss Nordic combined skier who has competed since 2000. Competing in three Winter Olympics, he earned his best finish of fourth in the 4 x 5 km team event at Turin in 2006 while earning his best individual finish of 11th in the 10 km individual normal hill event at Vancouver four years later.

Heer's best finish at the FIS Nordic World Ski Championships was fifth in the 4 x 5 km team event at Sapporo in 2007 while his best individual finish was 14th in the 10 km individual normal hill event at Liberec two years later.

His best individual finish at the World Cup was fifth at a 10 km individual normal hill event at Austria in 2009.
