= Ludovic Roux =

French Nordic combined skier (born 1979)

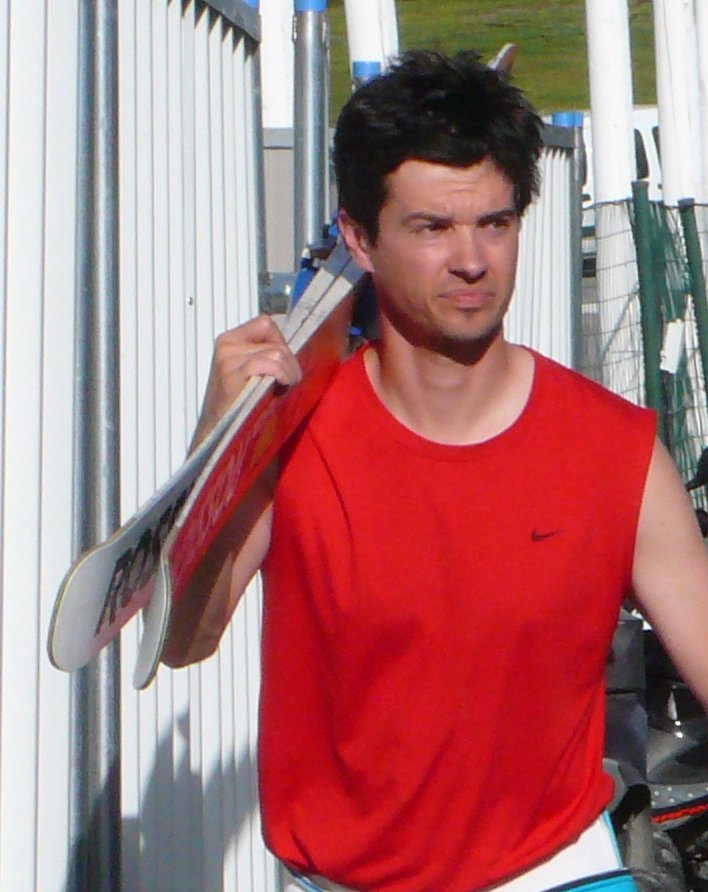
- Ludovic Roux (2010)

Medal record

Men's Nordic combined

Representing France

Olympic Games
Bronze medal – third place	1998 Nagano	4 x 5 km team

Ludovic Roux (born 4 April 1979 in Sallanches) is a former French Nordic combined skier who has competed since 1996. At the 1998 Winter Olympics in Nagano he won a bronze medal in the 4 x 5 km team event.

Roux married his longtime girlfriend Isabelle Delobel in the summer of 2009. The couple's first child a son, Loïc, was born on 1 October 2009.
