= Yosuke Hatakeyama =

Japanese Nordic combined skier

Personal information
- Nationality: Japanese
- Born: 28 July 1980 (age 46) Ōdate, Japan

Sport
- Sport: Nordic combined

Yosuke Hatakeyama (born 28 July 1980) is a Japanese skier. He competed in the Nordic combined event at the 2006 Winter Olympics.
