= Daito Takahashi =

Japanese Nordic combined skier (born 1980)

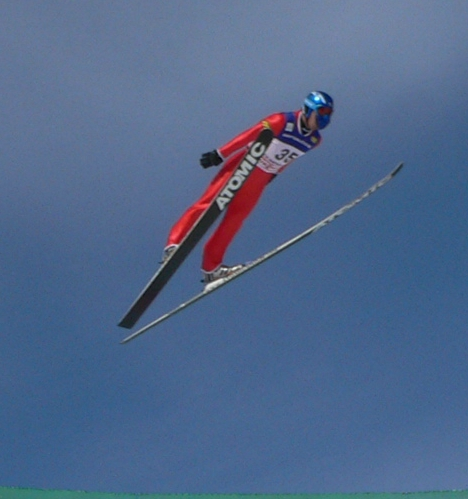
Daito Takahashi

Daito Takahashi (高橋 大斗, Takahashi Daito) (born December 16, 1980) is a Japanese Nordic combined skier who has competed since 2000. Competing in three Winter Olympics, he earned his best finish of sixth twice (7.5 km sprint event: 2002, 4 x 5 km team: 2006).

Takahashi's best finish at the FIS Nordic World Ski Championships was tenth twice (2003: 15 km individual, 2005: 7.5 km sprint). At the FIS Nordic World Ski Championships 2007 in Sapporo, Takahashi was involved in a serious crash during the ski jumping part of the 7.5 km sprint that resulted in him being sent to the hospital and not competing for the rest of the championships.

He has two individual victories in his career, both earned the same weekend in Finland in 2004 (7.5 km sprint, 15 km individual).
