= Nordic combined at the 2010 Winter Olympics – Individual normal hill/10 km =

Men's individual normal hill/10 km at the XXI Olympic Winter Games
- Pictogram for Nordic combined
- Venue: Whistler Olympic Park
- Dates: 14 February 2010
- Competitors: 45 from 14 nations
- Winning time: 25:47.1

Medalists
1st place, gold medalist(s)		Jason Lamy Chappuis	France
2nd place, silver medalist(s)		Johnny Spillane	United States
3rd place, bronze medalist(s)		Alessandro Pittin	Italy

The men's individual normal hill/10 km Nordic combined competition for the 2010 Winter Olympics in Vancouver, Canada, was held at Whistler Olympic Park in Whistler, British Columbia, on 14 February.

Germany's Georg Hettich was the defending Olympic champion when the event was known as the 15 km Individual Gundersen, but did not compete in this event. Todd Lodwick of the United States was the defending world champion in this event and would finish fourth in the Olympic event. The last World Cup event prior to the 2010 Games in this format took place on 31 January 2010 in Seefeld, Austria, and was won by Austria's Mario Stecher who would finish seventh. Seefeld was where the Nordic Combined events took place for both the 1964 and the 1976 Winter Olympics, held in neighboring Innsbruck, took place.

== Results ==
=== Ski jumping ===
The ski jumping took place with a trial round at 09:00 PST and the competition round at 10:00 PST. One jump in competition was scored similar to that of ski jumping. Finland's Ryynänen had the longest jump to grab the lead after the jump.

Rank	Bib	Name	Country	Distance (m)	Points	Time difference
1	25	Janne Ryynänen	Finland	105.0	135.5	0:00
2	33	Todd Lodwick	United States	101.5	127.0	+0:34
3	27	Christoph Bieler	Austria	100.5	125.0	+0:42
4	38	Johnny Spillane	United States	100.5	124.5	+0:44
5	45	Jason Lamy-Chappuis	France	100.0	124.0	+0:46
6	35	Alessandro Pittin	Italy	100.0	123.5	+0.48
7	40	Mario Stecher	Austria	99.5	122.5	+0:52
8	16	François Braud	France	99.5	122.0	+0:54
8	34	Anssi Koivuranta	Finland	99.5	122.0	+0:54
10	7	Brett Camerota	United States	100.0	121.5	+0:56
10	39	Pavel Churavý	Czech Republic	99.0	121.5	+0:56
12	26	Norihito Kobayashi	Japan	99.0	121.0	+0:58
13	5	Gašper Berlot	Slovenia	99.0	119.5	+1:04
13	11	Daito Takahashi	Japan	98.0	119.5	+1:04
13	18	Jaakko Tallus	Finland	98.5	119.5	+1:04
16	8	Lukas Runggaldier	Italy	98.5	119.0	+1:06
16	41	Tino Edelmann	Germany	98.5	119.0	+1:06
16	43	Eric Frenzel	Germany	98.0	119.0	+1:06
19	37	Björn Kircheisen	Germany	98.0	118.5	+1:08
20	29	David Kreiner	Austria	97.5	117.5	+1:12
21	24	Ronny Heer	Switzerland	97.0	116.5	+1:16
22	31	Hannu Manninen	Finland	97.0	116.0	+1:18
22	32	Petter L. Tande	Norway	97.0	116.0	+1:18
24	15	Tomáš Slavík	Czech Republic	96.5	115.5	+1:20
24	36	Bill Demong	United States	96.5	115.5	+1:20
26	10	Tommy Schmid	Switzerland	96.5	115.0	+1:22
27	28	Akito Watabe	Japan	96.5	114.5	+1:24
28	19	Taihei Kato	Japan	96.5	114.0	+1:26
29	17	Sébastien Lacroix	France	96.0	113.0	+1:30
30	12	Jonathan Felisaz	France	95.5	112.0	+1:34
30	23	Johannes Rydzek	Germany	95.5	112.0	+1:34
32	6	Sergej Maslennikov	Russia	95.5	111.5	+1:36
33	30	Jan Schmid	Norway	94.5	110.0	+1:42
34	20	Seppi Hurschler	Switzerland	94.0	109.0	+1:46
35	2	Aleš Vodseďálek	Czech Republic	93.5	108.5	+1:48
36	9	Mitja Oranič	Slovenia	93.5	108.0	+1:50
36	13	Tim Hug	Switzerland	93.5	108.0	+1:50
38	14	Giuseppe Michielli	Italy	93.0	107.0	+1:54
39	21	Miroslav Dvořák	Czech Republic	92.5	105.5	+2:00
40	42	Magnus Moan	Norway	91.5	104.0	+2:06
41	44	Felix Gottwald	Austria	91.0	102.5	+2:12
42	22	Mikko Kokslien	Norway	91.0	101.5	+2:16
43	4	Jason Myslicki	Canada	87.0	93.0	+2:50
44	1	Armin Bauer	Italy	86.5	91.5	+2:56
45	3	Volodymyr Trachuk	Ukraine	85.5	89.0	+3:06

=== Cross-country ===
The start for the 10 kilometre race was staggered, with a one-point deficit in the ski jump portion resulting in a four-second deficit in starting the cross-country course. This stagger meant that the first athlete across the finish line would be the overall winner of the event. Cross-country skiing's part of the competition took place at 13:45 PST that same day.

Ryynänen would lead until close to the end of the last part of the first lap before taking a spill where he never recovered. The Finn would finish 26th. A group of eight skiers developed during the middle part of the race which had Bill Demong move from 24th to the final lead group by the 7.5 km mark. Japan's Norihito Kobayashi grabbed the lead with 800 m left only to be passed by Johnny Spillane of the US, France's Jason Lamy-Chappuis, Italy's Alessandro Pittin, and Spillane's teammate Lodwick. Lamy-Chappuis passed Spillane right before the final sprint though Spillane mounted a final charge that fell 0.4 seconds short. Norway's Magnus Moan had the fastest time in the cross-country skiing portion of the event to move from 40th to ninth. It was the first individual medal for all three competitors, along with being the first medals for both the US and Italy in Nordic combined at the Winter Olympics. Italy's best finish prior to this event in Nordic combined was fifth by Ezio Damolin at the 1968 Winter Olympics in Grenoble.

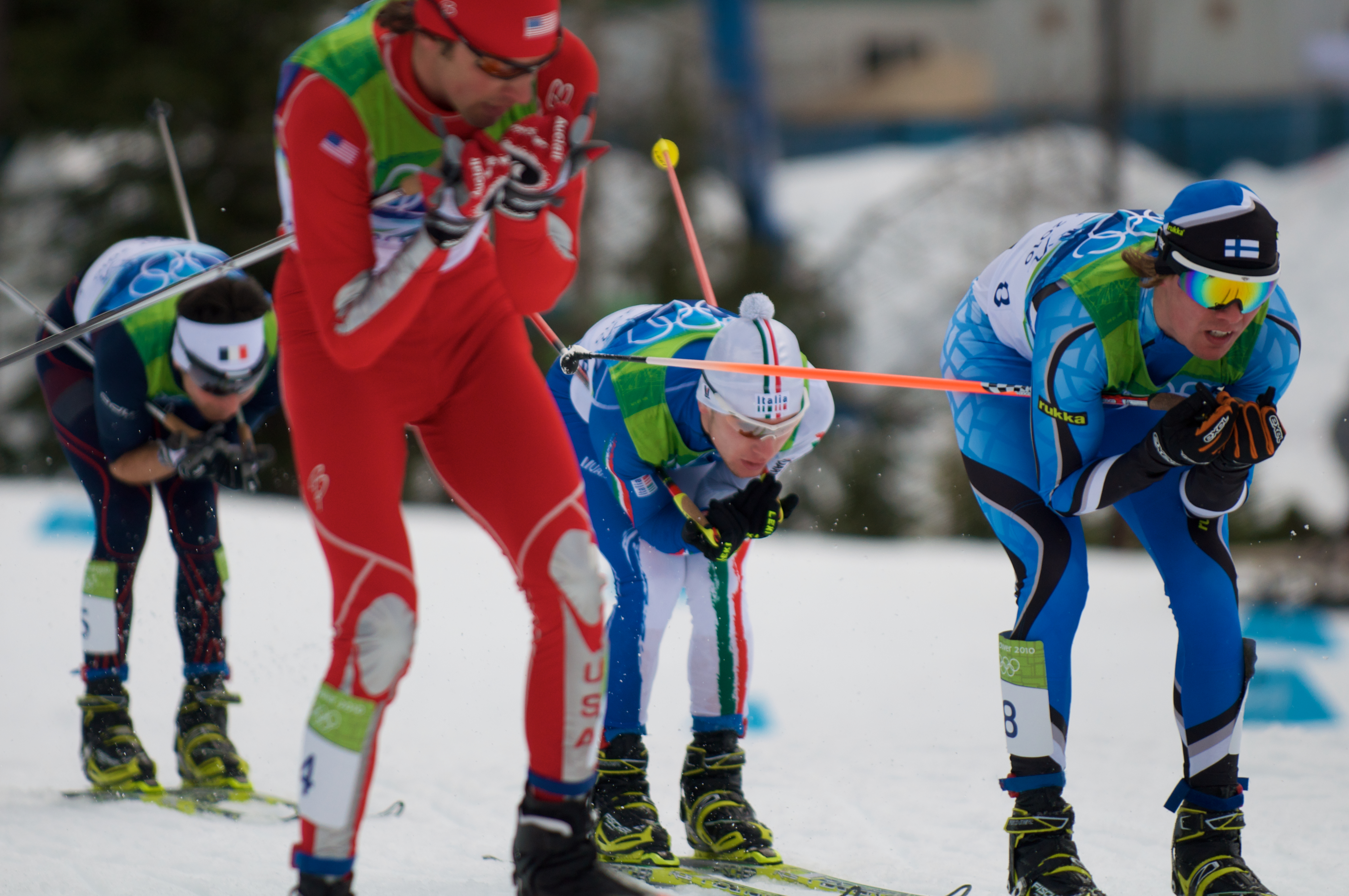
Leading group with all later medal winners (left to right: Jason Lamy-Chappuis (gold), Johnny Spillane (silver), Alessandro Pittin (bronze); in the right Anssi Koivuranta (8th place)

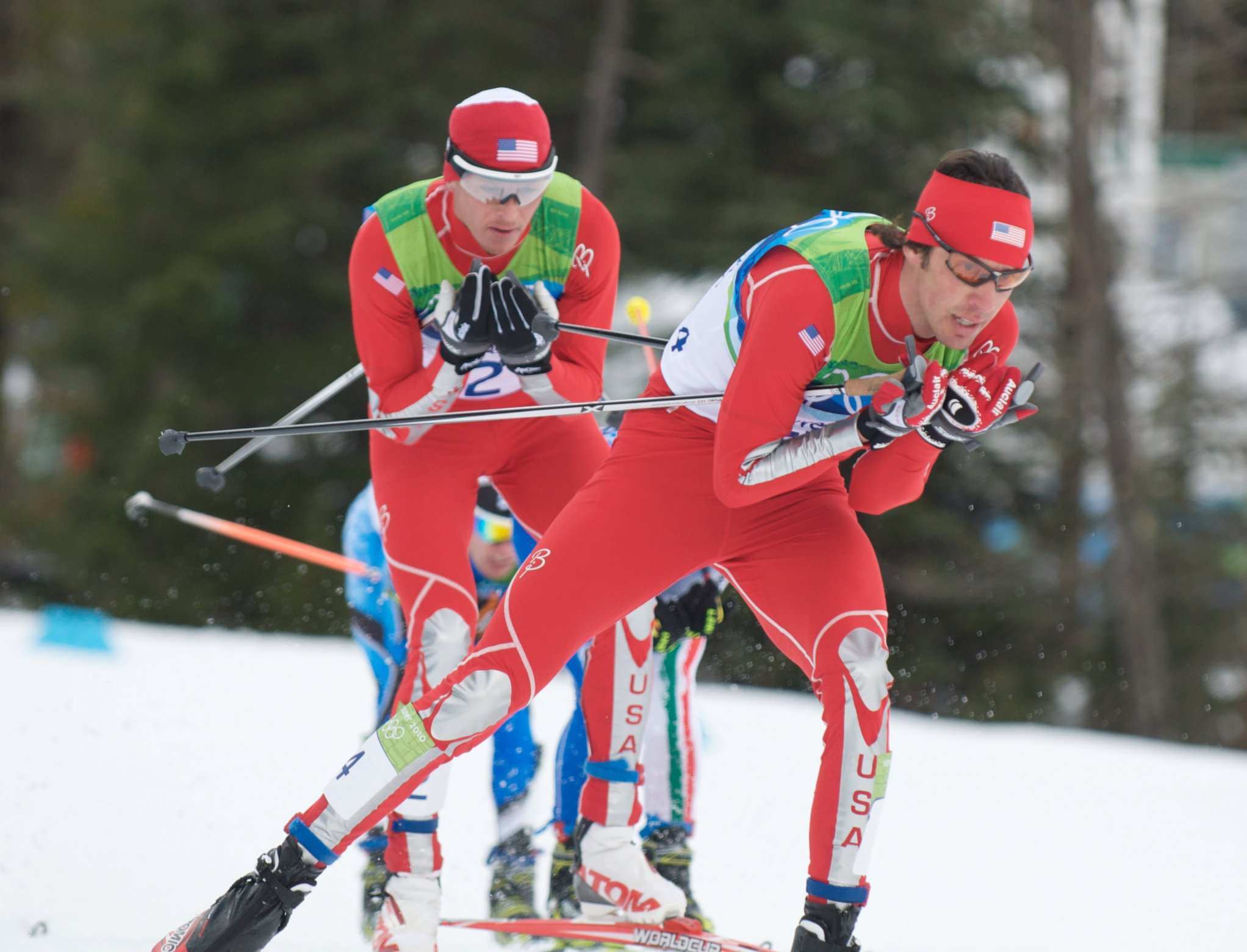
Johnny Spillane and Todd Lodwick

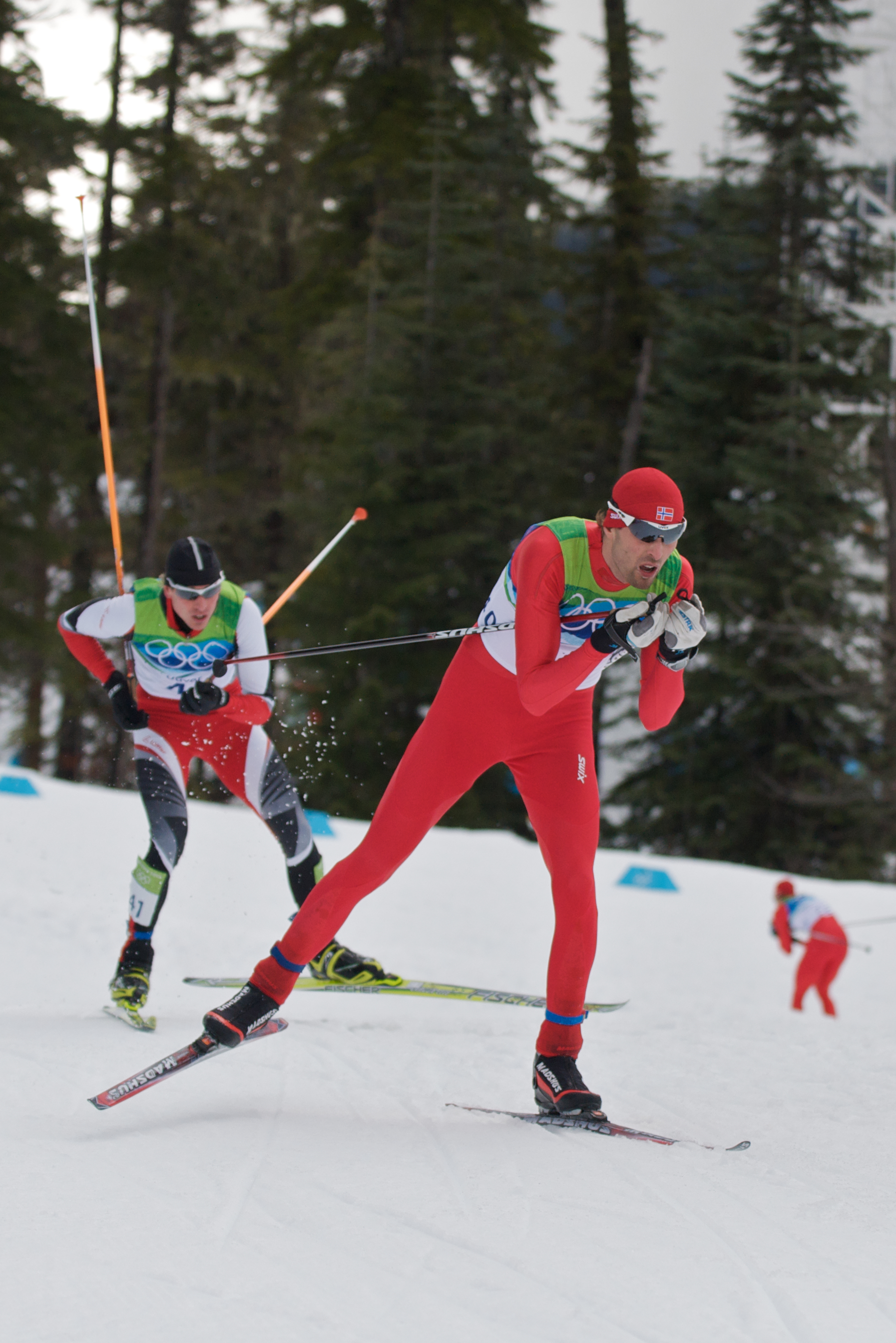
Magnus Moan and Felix Gottwald

Rank	Bib	Name	Country	Start time	Cross country time	Cross country rank	Finish time
1st place, gold medalist(s)	5	Jason Lamy-Chappuis	France	+0:46	25:01.1	5	25:47.1
2nd place, silver medalist(s)	4	Johnny Spillane	United States	+0:44	25:03.5	6	+0.4
3rd place, bronze medalist(s)	6	Alessandro Pittin	Italy	+0:48	24:59.9	4	+0.8
4	2	Todd Lodwick	United States	+0:34	25:14.6	11	+1.5
5	7	Mario Stecher	Austria	+0:52	25:08.7	7	+13.6
6	24	Bill Demong	United States	+1:20	24:45.0	3	+17.9
7	12	Norihito Kobayashi	Japan	+0:58	25:11.0	9	+21.9
8	8	Anssi Koivuranta	Finland	+0:54	25:22.9	13	+29.8
9	40	Magnus Moan	Norway	+2:06	24:16.7	1	+35.6
10	16	Eric Frenzel	Germany	+1:06	25:17.2	12	+36.1
11	21	Ronny Heer	Switzerland	+1:16	25:09.2	8	+38.1
12	10	Pavel Churavý	Czech Republic	+0:56	25:32.7	20	+41.6
13	23	Hannu Manninen	Finland	+1:18	25:12.4	10	+43.3
14	41	Felix Gottwald	Austria	+2:12	24:20.2	2	+45.1
15	20	David Kreiner	Austria	+1:12	25:24.5	15	+49.4
16	18	Lukas Runggaldier	Italy	+1:06	25:30.7	19	+49.6
17	22	Petter L. Tande	Norway	+1:18	25:29.2	18	+1:00.1
18	17	Tino Edelmann	Germany	+1:06	25:41.6	24	+1:00.5
19	29	Sébastien Lacroix	France	+1:30	25:26.3	16	+1:09.2
20	25	Tomáš Slavík	Czech Republic	+1:20	25:36.8	21	+1:09.7
21	27	Akito Watabe	Japan	+1:24	25:41.0	23	+1:17.9
22	19	Björn Kircheisen	Germany	+1:08	26:01.3	29	+1:22.2
23	33	Jan Schmid	Norway	+1:42	25:27.6	17	+1:22.5
24	28	Taihei Kato	Japan	+1:26	25:43.9	25	+1:22.8
25	3	Christoph Bieler	Austria	+0:42	26:32.0	34	+1:26.9
26	1	Janne Ryynänen	Finland	0:00	27:21.6	42	+1:34.5
27	14	Daito Takahashi	Japan	+1:04	26:21.0	33	+1:37.9
28	30	Johannes Rydzek	Germany	+1:34	25:51.3	28	+1:38.2
29	34	Seppi Hurschler	Switzerland	+1:46	25:40.6	22	+1.39.5
30	31	Jonathan Felisaz	France	+1:34	26:03.7	30	+1:50.6
31	37	Mitja Oranič	Slovenia	+1:50	25:48.3	27	+1:51.2
32	42	Mikko Kokslien	Norway	+2:16	25:23.2	14	+1:52.1
33	38	Giuseppe Michielli	Italy	+1:54	25:46.1	26	+1:53.0
34	9	François Braud	France	+0:54	26:58.3	37	+2:05.2
35	36	Tim Hug	Switzerland	+1:50	26:04.1	31	+2:07.0
36	11	Brett Camerota	United States	+0:56	27:00.6	38	+2:09.5
37	15	Gašper Berlot	Slovenia	+1:04	27:15.5	39	+2:32.4
38	13	Jaakko Tallus	Finland	+1:04	27:21.1	41	+2.38.0
39	39	Miroslav Dvořák	Czech Republic	+2:00	26:33.5	35	+2:46.4
40	26	Tommy Schmid	Switzerland	+1:22	27:38.5	43	+3:13.4
41	45	Volodymyr Trachuk	Ukraine	+3:06	26:18.4	32	+3:37.3
42	32	Sergej Maslennikov	Russia	+1:36	27:53.3	45	+3:42.2
43	44	Armin Bauer	Italy	+2:56	26:36.3	36	+3:45.2
44	35	Aleš Vodseďálek	Czech Republic	+1:48	27:45.8	44	+3:46.7
45	43	Jason Myslicki	Canada	+2:50	27:20.7	40	+4:23.6
