= List of FIS Nordic World Ski Championships 2011 medal winners =

The FIS Nordic World Ski Championships 2011 took place from 23 February to 6 March 2011 in Oslo, Norway. The championships consisted of 21 events in cross-country skiing, ski jumping, and Nordic combined, of which eight were team or relay events. The tournament was held at Holmenkollen National Arena, with ski jumping in the large Holmenkollbakken and the normal Midtstubakken, and coincided with the Holmenkollen Ski Festival. Since the 2009 World Championships, a normal hill team event was added for both ski jumping and Nordic combined, while the combined mass start was removed from the program.

Norway was the most successful nation, collecting eight gold medals and twenty medals overall. Austria was the second-most successful, collecting seven golds and ten golds overall. Austria won all ski jumping competitions, as well as both combined team events. Norway dominated the cross-country events, winning both relays and taking 12 of the 24 individual medals. Norway's Marit Bjørgen was the most successful athlete, winning four gold and one silver medal. Petter Northug, also from Norway, won three gold and two silver medals. Canada, with Devon Kershaw and Alex Harvey took its first-ever victory with gold in the men's team sprint. Sweden's Marcus Hellner won the men's sprint, while Finland's Matti Heikkinen won the men's 15 km. Sweden, with Ida Ingemarsdotter and Charlotte Kalla, won the Women's team sprint.

In ski jumping, the Austrians Thomas Morgenstern took three golds and one silver, Gregor Schlierenzauer won three golds, and Daniela Iraschko won the women's event. In the Nordic combined, Germany took four of the six individual medals. The normal hill was won by Germany's Eric Frenzel while France' Jason Lamy-Chappuis won the large hill.

== Events ==
=== Cross-country skiing ===
==== Men's ====
Event	Gold		Silver		Bronze	
15 kilometre classical	Matti Heikkinen; Finland	38:14.7	Eldar Rønning; Norway	+ 13.3	Martin Johnsrud Sundby; Norway	+ 31.9
30 kilometre pursuit	Petter Northug; Norway	1:14:10.4	Maxim Vylegzhanin; Russia	+ 0.7	Ilia Chernousov; Russia	+ 1.2
50 kilometre freestyle	Petter Northug; Norway	2:08:09.0	Maxim Vylegzhanin; Russia	+ 1.7	Tord Asle Gjerdalen; Norway	+ 6.3
4 × 10 kilometre relay	Norway; Martin Johnsrud Sundby; Eldar Rønning; Tord Asle Gjerdalen; Petter Northug	1:40:10.2	Sweden; Daniel Rickardsson; Johan Olsson; Anders Södergren; Marcus Hellner	+ 1.3	Germany; Jens Filbrich; Axel Teichmann; Franz Göring; Tobias Angerer	+ 5.7
Sprint	Marcus Hellner; Sweden	2:57.4	Petter Northug; Norway	+ 0.6	Emil Jönsson; Sweden	+ 1.1
Team sprint	Canada; Devon Kershaw; Alex Harvey	19:10.0	Norway; Petter Northug; Ola Vigen Hattestad	+ 0.2	Russia; Alexander Panzhinskiy; Nikita Kriukov	+ 0.4

==== Women's ====
Event	Gold		Silver		Bronze	
10 kilometre classical	Marit Bjørgen; Norway	27:39.3	Justyna Kowalczyk; Poland	+ 4.1	Aino-Kaisa Saarinen; Finland	+ 9.7
15 kilometre pursuit	Marit Bjørgen; Norway	38:08.6	Justyna Kowalczyk; Poland	+ 7.5	Therese Johaug; Norway	+ 8.8
30 kilometre freestyle	Therese Johaug; Norway	1:23:45.1	Marit Bjørgen; Norway	+ 44.0	Justyna Kowalczyk; Poland	+ 1:34.0
4 × 5 kilometre relay	Norway; Vibeke Skofterud; Therese Johaug; Kristin Størmer Steira; Marit Bjørgen	53:30.0	Sweden; Ida Ingemarsdotter; Anna Haag; Britta Johansson Norgren; Charlotte Kalla	+36.1	Finland; Pirjo Muranen; Aino Kaisa Saarinen; Riitta-Liisa Roponen; Krista Lähteenmäki	+59.8
Sprint	Marit Bjørgen; Norway	3:03.9	Arianna Follis; Italy	+ 0.2	Petra Majdič; Slovenia	+ 0.5
Team sprint	Sweden; Ida Ingemarsdotter; Charlotte Kalla	19:25.0	Finland; Aino Kaisa Saarinen; Krista Lähteenmäki	+ 3.3	Norway; Maiken Caspersen Falla; Astrid Uhrenholdt Jacobsen	+ 4.1

=== Nordic combined ===
Event	Gold		Silver		Bronze	
Individual large hill/10 km	Jason Lamy Chappuis; France	25:31.6	Johannes Rydzek; Germany	+6.7	Eric Frenzel; Germany	+7.0
Individual normal hill/10 km	Eric Frenzel; Germany	25:19.2	Tino Edelmann; Germany	+11.9	Felix Gottwald; Austria	+18.4
Team normal hill/4 × 5 km	Austria; David Kreiner; Bernhard Gruber; Felix Gottwald; Mario Stecher	48:07.8	Germany; Johannes Rydzek; Björn Kircheisen; Tino Edelmann; Eric Frenzel	+0.4	Norway; Jan Schmid; Magnus Moan; Mikko Kokslien; Håvard Klemetsen	+40.6
Team large hill/4 × 5 km	Austria; Bernhard Gruber; David Kreiner; Felix Gottwald; Mario Stecher	47:12.3	Germany; Johannes Rydzek; Björn Kircheisen; Eric Frenzel; Tino Edelmann	+0.1	Norway; Mikko Kokslien; Håvard Klemetsen; Jan Schmid; Magnus Moan	+40.6

=== Ski jumping ===
==== Men's ====
Event	Gold		Silver		Bronze	
Men's individual normal hill (HS106)	Thomas Morgenstern; Austria	269.2	Andreas Kofler; Austria	260.1	Adam Małysz; Poland	252.2
Men's individual large hill (HS134)	Gregor Schlierenzauer; Austria	277.5	Thomas Morgenstern; Austria	277.2	Simon Ammann; Switzerland	274.3
Men's team normal hill (HS106)	Austria; Gregor Schlierenzauer; Martin Koch; Andreas Kofler; Thomas Morgenstern	1025.5	Norway; Anders Jacobsen; Bjørn Einar Romøren; Anders Bardal; Tom Hilde	1000.5	Germany; Martin Schmitt; Michael Neumayer; Michael Uhrmann; Severin Freund	968.2
Men's team large hill (HS134)	Austria; Gregor Schlierenzauer; Martin Koch; Andreas Kofler; Thomas Morgenstern	500.0	Norway; Anders Jacobsen; Johan Remen Evensen; Anders Bardal; Tom Hilde	456.4	Slovenia; Peter Prevc; Jurij Tepeš; Jernej Damjan; Robert Kranjec	452.6

==== Women's ====
Event	Gold		Silver		Bronze	
Women's individual normal hill (HS106)	Daniela Iraschko; Austria	231.7	Elena Runggaldier; Italy	218.9	Coline Mattel; France	211.5

== Medal table ==
=== Nations ===
* Host nation (Norway)

Rank	Nation	Gold	Silver	Bronze	Total
1	Norway (NOR)*	8	6	6	20
2	Austria (AUT)	7	2	1	10
3	Sweden (SWE)	2	2	1	5
4	Germany (GER)	1	4	3	8
5	Finland (FIN)	1	1	2	4
6	France (FRA)	1	0	1	2
7	Canada (CAN)	1	0	0	1
8	Poland (POL)	0	2	2	4
8	Russia (RUS)	0	2	2	4
10	Italy (ITA)	0	2	0	2
11	Slovenia (SLO)	0	0	2	2
12	Switzerland (SUI)	0	0	1	1
Totals (12 entries)		21	21	21	63

=== Athletes ===
Rank	Athlete	Nation	Gold	Silver	Bronze	Total
1	Marit Bjørgen	Norway	4	1	0	5
2	Petter Northug	Norway	3	2	0	5
3	Thomas Morgenstern	Austria	3	1	0	4
4	Gregor Schlierenzauer	Austria	3	0	0	3
5	Andreas Kofler	Austria	2	1	0	3
6=	Felix Gottwald	Austria	2	0	1	3
6=	Therese Johaug	Norway	2	0	1	3
8=	Bernhard Gruber	Austria	2	0	0	2
8=	David Kreiner	Austria	2	0	0	2
8=	Mario Stecher	Austria	2	0	0	2
8=	Martin Koch	Austria	2	0	0	2
12	Eric Frenzel	Germany	1	2	1	4
13=	Marcus Hellner	Sweden	1	1	0	2
13=	Ida Ingemarsdotter	Sweden	1	1	0	2
13=	Charlotte Kalla	Sweden	1	1	0	2
13=	Eldar Rønning	Norway	1	1	0	2
17=	Martin Johnsrud Sundby	Norway	1	0	1	2
17=	Tord Asle Gjerdalen	Norway	1	0	1	2
19=	Jason Lamy Chappuis	France	1	0	0	1
19=	Alex Harvey	Canada	1	0	0	1
19=	Matti Heikkinen	Finland	1	0	0	1
19=	Daniela Iraschko	Austria	1	0	0	1
19=	Devon Kershaw	Canada	1	0	0	1
19=	Vibeke Skofterud	Norway	1	0	0	1
19=	Kristin Størmer Steira	Norway	1	0	0	1
26=	Tino Edelmann	Germany	0	3	0	3
26=	Johannes Rydzek	Germany	0	3	0	3
28	Justyna Kowalczyk	Poland	0	2	1	3
29=	Anders Bardal	Norway	0	2	0	2
29=	Tom Hilde	Norway	0	2	0	2
29=	Anders Jacobsen	Norway	0	2	0	2
29=	Maxim Vylegzhanin	Russia	0	2	0	2
29=	Björn Kircheisen	Germany	0	2	0	2
34	Aino-Kaisa Saarinen	Finland	0	1	2	3
35	Krista Lähteenmäki	Finland	0	1	1	2
36=	Johan Remen Evensen	Norway	0	1	0	1
36=	Arianna Follis	Italy	0	1	0	1
36=	Anna Haag	Sweden	0	1	0	1
36=	Ola Vigen Hattestad	Norway	0	1	0	1
36=	Britta Johansson Norgren	Sweden	0	1	0	1
36=	Johan Olsson	Sweden	0	1	0	1
36=	Daniel Rickardsson	Sweden	0	1	0	1
36=	Bjørn Einar Romøren	Norway	0	1	0	1
36=	Elena Runggaldier	Italy	0	1	0	1
36=	Anders Södergren	Sweden	0	1	0	1
46=	Mikko Kokslien	Norway	0	0	2	2
46=	Håvard Klemetsen	Norway	0	0	2	2
46=	Magnus Moan	Norway	0	0	2	2
46=	Jan Schmid	Norway	0	0	2	2
50=	Simon Ammann	Switzerland	0	0	1	1
50=	Tobias Angerer	Germany	0	0	1	1
50=	Ilia Chernousov	Russia	0	0	1	1
50=	Jernej Damjan	Slovenia	0	0	1	1
50=	Maiken Caspersen Falla	Norway	0	0	1	1
50=	Jens Filbrich	Germany	0	0	1	1
50=	Severin Freund	Germany	0	0	1	1
50=	Franz Göring	Germany	0	0	1	1
50=	Astrid Uhrenholdt Jacobsen	Norway	0	0	1	1
50=	Emil Jönsson	Sweden	0	0	1	1
50=	Robert Kranjec	Slovenia	0	0	1	1
50=	Nikita Kriukov	Russia	0	0	1	1
50=	Petra Majdič	Slovenia	0	0	1	1
50=	Adam Małysz	Poland	0	0	1	1
50=	Coline Mattel	France	0	0	1	1
50=	Pirjo Muranen	Finland	0	0	1	1
50=	Michael Neumayer	Germany	0	0	1	1
50=	Alexander Panzhinskiy	Russia	0	0	1	1
50=	Peter Prevc	Slovenia	0	0	1	1
50=	Riitta-Liisa Roponen	Finland	0	0	1	1
50=	Martin Schmitt	Germany	0	0	1	1
50=	Axel Teichmann	Germany	0	0	1	1
50=	Jurij Tepeš	Slovenia	0	0	1	1
50=	Michael Uhrmann	Germany	0	0	1	1
