= FIS Nordic World Ski Championships 2011 – Team large hill/4 × 5 km =

The Men's Team large hill/4 x 5 km at the FIS Nordic World Ski Championships 2011 was held on 4 March 2011. The ski jumping part of this event took place at 11:30 CET while the cross-country part of the event took place at 15:30 CET. Japan's team of Yūsuke Minato, Taihei Kato, Akito Watabe, and Norihito Kobayashi were the defending world champions while the Austrian team of Bernhard Gruber, Felix Gottwald, Mario Stecher, and David Kreiner were the defending Olympic champions.

== Ski Jumping ==
Rank	Bib	Country	Distance (m)	Points	Time difference
1	9	France; François Braud; Sébastien Lacroix; Maxime Laheurte; Jason Lamy-Chappuis	132.5; 125.0; 137.0; 128.5	515.0; 131.6; 118.4; 138.2; 126.8	
2	10	Germany; Johannes Rydzek; Björn Kircheisen; Tino Edelmann; Eric Frenzel	127.5; 126.5; 131.0; 125.5	491.1; 122.1; 120.5; 126.4; 122.1	+0:32
3	12	Austria; Bernhard Gruber; Felix Gottwald; David Kreiner; Mario Stecher	128.0; 121.5; 130.5; 129.0	485.5; 125.3; 110.0; 127.2; 123.0	+0:39
4	11	Norway; Jan Schmid; Mikko Kokslien; Magnus Moan; Håvard Klemetsen	125.0; 115.0; 129.0; 135.5	474.8; 118.3; 99.6; 123.2; 133.7	+0:54
5	6	United States; Bryan Fletcher; Johnny Spillane; Bill Demong; Todd Lodwick	125.0; 124.0; 124.0; 122.5	467.3; 117.8; 115.3; 116.5; 117.7	+1:04
6	3	Slovenia; Gašper Berlot; Mitja Oranič; Jože Kamenik; Marjan Jelenko	124.0; 120.5; 125.5; 124.5	459.4; 117.0; 108.1; 118.9; 115.4	+1:14
7	4	Czech Republic; Tomáš Slavík; Aleš Vodseďálek; Miroslav Dvořák; Pavel Churavý	130.0; 123.0; 119.0; 117.0	450.3; 125.0; 115.1; 105.2; 105.0	+1:26
8	7	Japan; Yūsuke Minato; Norihito Kobayashi; Taihei Kato; Akito Watabe	119.0; 116.0; 130.0; 125.0	447.6; 106.6; 101.5; 122.5; 117.0	+1:30
9	2	Estonia; Aldo Leetoja; Kail Piho; Karl-August Tiirmaa; Kaarel Nurmsalu	116.0; 117.0; 121.5; 133.5	440.8; 99.9; 103.5; 109.8; 127.6	+1:39
10	8	Italy; Armin Bauer; Giuseppe Michielli; Alessandro Pittin; Lukas Runggaldier	117.0; 114.0; 119.0; 126.0	437.7; 107.7; 97.4; 108.4; 124.2	+1:43
11	1	Russia; Dimitry Matveev; Sergey Maslennikov; Ivan Panin; Niyaz Nabeev	123.0; 118.0; 123.5; 122.0	437.3; 112.5; 103.5; 114.0; 107.3	+1:44
12	5	Switzerland; Tommy Schmid; Ronny Heer; Seppi Hurschler; Tim Hug	121.0; 120.0; 119.0; 113.0	425.4; 108.0; 107.5; 108.0; 101.9	+1:59

== Cross-Country ==
Rank	Bib	Country	Deficit	Time	Rank	Time difference
1st place, gold medalist(s)	3	Austria; Bernhard Gruber; David Kreiner; Felix Gottwald; Mario Stecher	0:39	46:33.3; 11:46.3; 11:39.3; 11:24.0; 11:43.7	1	47:12.3
2nd place, silver medalist(s)	2	Germany; Johannes Rydzek; Björn Kircheisen; Eric Frenzel; Tino Edelmann	0:32	46:40.4; 12:01.9; 11:30.8; 11:25.4; 11:42.3	2	+0.1
3rd place, bronze medalist(s)	4	Norway; Mikko Kokslien; Håvard Klemetsen; Jan Schmid; Magnus Moan	0:54	46:58.9; 11:25.7; 11:52.1; 11:45.5; 11:55.6	3	+40.6
4	1	France; Sébastien Lacroix; Maxime Laheurte; François Braud; Jason Lamy-Chappuis	0:00	48:04.2; 12:01.1; 12:13.3; 11:53.5; 11:56.3	6	+51.9
5	8	Japan; Akito Watabe; Taihei Kato; Yūsuke Minato; Norihito Kobayashi	1:30	47:13.7; 11:44.0; 11:56.6; 11:37.9; 11:55.2	4	+1:31.4
6	5	United States; Bill Demong; Bryan Fletcher; Johnny Spillane; Todd Lodwick	1:04	47:52.3; 11:37.7; 12:04.4; 11:55.2; 12:15.0	5	+1:44.0
7	10	Italy; Giuseppe Michielli; Armin Bauer; Lukas Runggaldier; Alessandro Pittin	1:43	48:14.9; 12:08.7; 12:04.0; 12:10.5; 11:51.7	7	+2:45.6
8	12	Switzerland; Ronny Heer; Seppi Hurschler; Tim Hug; Tommy Schmid	1:59	48:18.1; 11:53.5; 11:37.3; 12:00.8; 12:46.5	8	+3:04.8
9	7	Czech Republic; Miroslav Dvořák; Tomáš Slavík; Aleš Vodseďálek; Pavel Churavý	1:26	48:51.5; 11:44.2; 11:59.9; 12:38.9; 12:28.5	7	+3:05.2
10	6	Slovenia; Mitja Oranič; Marjan Jelenko; Jože Kamenik; Gašper Berlot	1:14	50:00.1; 12:13.8; 12:20.4; 12:58.5; 12:27.4	10	+4:01.8
11	11	Russia; Ivan Panin; Dimitry Matveev; Niyaz Nabeev; Sergey Maslennikov	1:44	52:08.2; 13:12.0; 12:41.1; 13:02.3; 13:12.8	11	+6:39.9
	9	Estonia; Aldo Leetoja; Kail Piho; Karl-August Tiirmaa; Kaarel Nurmsalu	1:39	DNS		
