= Nordic combined at the 2010 Winter Olympics – Team large hill/4 × 5 km =

Team large hill/4 × 5 km at the XXI Olympic Winter Games
- Venue: Whistler Olympic Park
- Dates: 23 February 2010
- Competitors: 40 (10 teams) from 10 nations
- Winning time: Team jump: 479.9; Ski time: 48:55.6; Final time: 49:31.6

Medalists
1st place, gold medalist(s)		Bernhard Gruber; Felix Gottwald; Mario Stecher; David Kreiner	Austria
2nd place, silver medalist(s)		Brett Camerota; Todd Lodwick; Johnny Spillane; Bill Demong	United States
3rd place, bronze medalist(s)		Johannes Rydzek; Tino Edelmann; Eric Frenzel; Björn Kircheisen	Germany

The men's team large hill/4 × 5 km Nordic combined competition for the 2010 Winter Olympics in Vancouver, Canada was held at Whistler Olympic Park in Whistler, British Columbia on 23 February. The Austrian team of Michael Gruber, Christoph Bieler, Felix Gottwald, and Mario Stecher were the defending Olympic champions. Gruber retired after the 2007-08 season. Gottwald originally retired after the 2006-07 World Cup season, but came out of retirement in May 2009 to compete for the 2009-10 World Cup season including the 2010 Games. The defending world champions were the Japanese team of Yūsuke Minato, Taihei Kato, Akito Watabe, and Norihito Kobayashi. The last World Cup event prior to the 2010 Games in this format took place on 12 December 2009 in Harrachov, Czech Republic, but that event was cancelled on 4 December 2009 to warm weather and lack of snow. A team normal hill event took place prior to the 2010 Winter Games in Schonach, Germany on 24 January 2010 and was won by the German team of Georg Hettich, Eric Frenzel, Björn Kircheisen, and Tino Edelmann.

== Results ==
=== Ski Jumping ===
Each of the four team members performed a single jump that was judged in the same format as the Olympic ski jumping competition. The scores for all the jumps each team were combined and used to calculate their deficit in the cross-country skiing portion of the event. Each point difference between teams in the ski jumping portion in this event resulted in a 1.33 second difference in the cross country part of the event (i.e. one minute cross country from 45 points in ski jumping). At the previous Olympics in Turin, the point-time differential was one point equaling one second. The ski jumping portion took place with a trial round at 10:30 PST and the competition round at 11:30 PST. Finland's Ryynänen had the longest jump in the ski jumping part of the competition with 138.5 m, which helped the Finns have a two-second advantage over the Americans at the cross-country portion of the event.

Rank	Bib	Country	Distance (m)	Points	Time difference
1	5	Finland; Janne Ryynänen; Jaakko Tallus; Hannu Manninen; Anssi Koivuranta	138.5; 129.5; 130.0; 136.0	507.0; 134.2; 120.3; 120.5; 132.0	0:00
2	6	United States; Brett Camerota; Todd Lodwick; Bill Demong; Johnny Spillane	133.5; 136.5; 131.5; 134.0	505.8; 122.3; 132.2; 123.8; 127.5	0:02
3	10	Austria; Mario Stecher; David Kreiner; Bernhard Gruber; Felix Gottwald	130.5; 126.5; 136.0; 125.0	479.9; 121.7; 114.7; 131.0; 112.5	0:36
4	2	Japan; Daito Takahashi; Akito Watabe; Norihito Kobayashi; Taihei Kato	136.5; 125.0; 124.0; 132.5	475.9; 132.2; 112.0; 110.0; 121.7	0:41
5	8	France; François Braud; Sébastien Lacroix; Maxime Laheurte; Jason Lamy-Chappuis	128.5; 123.5; 128.5; 135.0	474.7; 117.7; 110.3; 117.7; 129.0	0:43
6	9	Germany; Tino Edelmann; Johannes Rydzek; Björn Kircheisen; Eric Frenzel	123.0; 129.0; 132.0; 129.5	473.3; 109.0; 119.0; 124.5; 120.8	0:45
7	7	Norway; Espen Rian; Jan Schmid; Magnus Moan; Petter L. Tande	128.0; 121.5; 131.5; 131.5	468.4; 117.0; 105.8; 122.8; 122.8	0:51
8	4	Czech Republic; Aleš Vodseďálek; Miroslav Dvořák; Tomáš Slavík; Pavel Churavý	123.0; 124.0; 125.5; 132.0	457.3; 109.0; 110.5; 113.3; 124.5	1:06
9	1	Switzerland; Tim Hug; Seppi Hurschler; Tommy Schmid; Ronny Heer	123.5; 121.0; 131.5; 117.0	436.6; 110.3; 105.0; 122.8; 98.5	1:34
10	3	Italy; Lukas Runggaldier; Armin Bauer; Giuseppe Michielli; Alessandro Pittin	126.5; 114.0; 112.5; 122.5	402.6; 113.7; 92.0; 89.7; 107.2	2:19

=== Cross-Country ===
The start for the 4 × 5 kilometre relay race was staggered, with a one-point deficit in the ski jump portion resulting in a 1.33 second deficit in starting the cross-country course. This stagger means that the first team across the finish line won the event. The start time for the cross country portion of the event took place at 14:00 PST that same day. Top three teams at the start of the cross-country portion of the event were Finland (who would finish seventh), the United States, and Austria. Eventual fifth-place finisher Norway's Schmid had the fastest first leg to propel his team from seventh to sixth, with the top three teams at the first exchange being the United States, Finland, and Austria. David Kreiner of Austria had both the fastest second leg and fastest cross-country leg overall to move his team from third to second, with the top three teams at the second exchange being the United States, Austria, and France (who would finish fourth). Kreiner's teammate, Felix Gottwald, had the fastest leg in the third leg to move past American Johnny Spillane for the lead, with German Eric Frenzel moving his team past France's Sebastien Lacroix for third place at the third exchange. Bill Demong of the United States closed the 14.1 second gap to Austria's Mario Stecher down to a lead heading into the final descent before slipping. Stecher moved ahead to win Austria its second straight gold medal in this event, with Bernhard Gruber replacing Michael Gruber, and Kreiner replacing Bieler. Defending World champion Japan, with Takahashi replacing Minato, finished a disappointing sixth. Germany won the bronze, with Rydzek replacing Hettich. It was the first Olympic medals for Gruber, Kreiner, Camerota, Lodwick, Demong, Rydzek, Edelmann, and Frenzel. The 5.2 second margin of victory was the closest at the Winter Olympics in this event since West Germany's 3.4 second win over Switzerland at Calgary in 1988.

Rank	Bib	Country	Deficit	Time	Rank	Time difference
1st place, gold medalist(s)	3	Austria; Bernhard Gruber; David Kreiner; Felix Gottwald; Mario Stecher	0:36	48:55.6; 11:57.7; 11:49.0; 12:04.3; 13:04.6	1	0.0
2nd place, silver medalist(s)	2	United States; Brett Camerota; Todd Lodwick; Johnny Spillane; Bill Demong	0:02	49:34.8; 12:28.0; 11:52.3; 12:18.8; 12:55.7	4	+5.2
3rd place, bronze medalist(s)	6	Germany; Johannes Rydzek; Tino Edelmann; Eric Frenzel; Björn Kircheisen	0:45	49:06.1; 11:56.2; 11:58.0; 12:13.6; 12:58.3	2	+19.5
4	5	France; Maxime Laheurte; François Braud; Sébastien Lacroix; Jason Lamy-Chappuis	0:43	49:28.4; 11:53.3; 12:02.3; 12:34.7; 12:58.1	3	+39.8
5	7	Norway; Jan Schmid; Espen Rian; Petter L. Tande; Magnus Moan	0:51	49:34.9; 11:51.4; 12:13.5; 12:32.9; 12:57.1	5	+54.3
6	4	Japan; Taihei Kato; Daito Takahashi; Akito Watabe; Norihito Kobayashi	0:41	50:04.8; 12:01.8; 12:07.3; 12:38.3; 13:17.4	6	+1:14.2
7	1	Finland; Janne Ryynänen; Jaakko Tallus; Anssi Koivuranta; Hannu Manninen	0:00	51:53.1; 12:32.6; 12:46.8; 13:12.9; 13:20.8	8	+2:21.5
8	8	Czech Republic; Aleš Vodseďálek; Miroslav Dvořák; Tomáš Slavík; Pavel Churavý	1:06	51:44.2; 12:51.5; 12:10.8; 13:08.1; 13:33.8	7	+3:18.6
9	9	Switzerland; Seppi Hurschler; Tim Hug; Tommy Schmid; Ronny Heer	1:34	52:15.8; 12:02.2; 12:31.7; 13:38.8; 14:03.1	10	+4:18.2
10	10	Italy; Alessandro Pittin; Giuseppe Michielli; Lukas Runggaldier; Armin Bauer	2:19	51:55.5; 12:07.8; 12:20.2; 13:27.5; 14:00.0	9	+4:42.9
