= 2007–08 FIS Nordic Combined World Cup =

International skiing competition

Nordic Combined World Cup 2007/08
Winners
- Overall: (Germany) Ronny Ackermann
- Sprint: (Germany) Ronny Ackermann
- Grand Prix Germany: (Finland) Hannu Manninen
- Nations Cup: Germany

Competitions
- Venues: 12
- Individual: 20
- Cancelled: 4

The 2007/08 FIS Nordic Combined World Cup was the 25th world cup season, a combination of ski jumping and cross-country skiing organized by FIS. The season started on 30 November 2007 and lasted until 9 March 2008.

== Calendar ==
=== Men ===
| Num | Season | Date | Place | Hill | Discipline | Winner | Second | Third |
|---|---|---|---|---|---|---|---|---|
| 293 | 1 | 30 November 2007 | (Finland) Kuusamo | Rukatunturi | HS142 / 15 km | (Germany) Ronny Ackermann | (United States) Johnny Spillane | (Austria) Christoph Bieler |
| 294 | 2 | 1 December 2007 | (Finland) Kuusamo | Rukatunturi | HS142 / 7.5 km | (Germany) Björn Kircheisen | (Finland) Hannu Manninen | (United States) Bill Demong |
| 295 | 3 | 8 December 2007 | (Norway) Trondheim | Granåsen | HS131 / 15 km | (United States) Bill Demong | (Germany) Björn Kircheisen | (Germany) Ronny Ackermann |
| 296 | 4 | 9 December 2007 | (Norway) Trondheim | Granåsen | HS131 / 7.5 km | (Austria) Christoph Bieler | (France) Jason Lamy-Chappuis | (Austria) Bernhard Gruber |
| 297 | 5 | 15 December 2007 | (Austria) Ramsau | W90-Mattensprunganlage | 10 km / HS98 | (Germany) Björn Kircheisen | (Austria) Bernhard Gruber | (Norway) Petter Tande |
| 298 | 6 | 16 December 2007 | (Austria) Ramsau | W90-Mattensprunganlage | HS98 / 7.5 km | (Germany) Björn Kircheisen | (Germany) Ronny Ackermann | (Germany) Tino Edelmann |
2nd Grand Prix Germany (30 December 2007 - 6 January 2008)
| 299 | 7 | 30 December 2007 | (Germany) Oberhof | Hans-Renner-Schanze | HS140 / 15 km | (Norway) Magnus Moan | (United States) Bill Demong | (Norway) Petter Tande |
| 300 | 8 | 5 January 2008 | (Germany) Schonach | Langenwaldschanze | HS96 / 7.5 km | (France) Jason Lamy-Chappuis | (United States) Bill Demong | (Norway) Magnus Moan |
| 301 | 9 | 6 January 2008 | (Germany) Schonach | Langenwaldschanze | HS96 / 15 km | (Norway) Petter Tande | (Finland) Hannu Manninen | (Germany) Ronny Ackermann |
| | | 5 January 2008 | (Germany) Ruhpolding | Große Zirmbergschanze | HS128 / 15 km | replaced in Schonach | | |
| | | 6 January 2008 | (Germany) Ruhpolding | Große Zirmbergschanze | HS128 / 7.5 km | replaced in Schonach | | |
| 302 | 10 | 12 January 2008 | (Italy) Val di Fiemme | Trampolino dal Ben | HS134 / 15 km | (Germany) Ronny Ackermann | (United States) Bill Demong | (Germany) Sebastian Haseney |
| 303 | 11 | 13 January 2008 | (Italy) Val di Fiemme | Trampolino dal Ben | HS134 / 7.5 km | (Germany) Sebastian Haseney | (France) Jason Lamy-Chappuis | (Austria) David Kreiner |
| 304 | 12 | 19-20 January 2008 | (Germany) Klingenthal^{1} | Vogtland Arena | 10 km / HS140 | (Germany) Eric Frenzel | (Germany) Ronny Ackermann | (Finland) Anssi Koivuranta |
| 305 | 13 | 20 January 2008 | (Germany) Klingenthal | Vogtland Arena | HS140 / 7.5 km | (Germany) Ronny Ackermann | (Germany) Eric Frenzel | (Austria) David Kreiner |
| 306 | 14 | 26 January 2008 | (Austria) Seefeld | Toni-Seelos-Olympiaschanze | HS100 / 7.5 km | (Austria) Christoph Bieler | (Norway) Magnus Moan | (Germany) Ronny Ackermann |
| 307 | 15 | 26-27 January 2008 | (Austria) Seefeld^{2} | Toni-Seelos-Olympiaschanze | HS100 / 7.5 km | (France) Jason Lamy-Chappuis | (Austria) Bernhard Gruber | (Austria) Christoph Bieler |
| | | 15 February 2008 | (Czech Republic) Liberec | Ještěd A | HS134 / 7.5 km | bad weather | | |
| 308 | 16 | 16 February 2008 | (Czech Republic) Liberec^{3} | Ještěd A | 10 km / HS134 | (Norway) Petter Tande | (Finland) Anssi Koivuranta | (Germany) Ronny Ackermann |
| | | 17 February 2008 | (Czech Republic) Liberec | Ještěd A | HS134 / 7.5 km | bad weather | | |
| | | 23 February 2008 | (Poland) Zakopane | Wielka Krokiew | 10 km / HS134 | bad weather | | |
| 309 | 17 | 24 February 2008 | (Poland) Zakopane | Wielka Krokiew | HS134 / 7.5 km | (Austria) Bernhard Gruber | (Switzerland) Tommy Schmid | (United States) Bill Demong |
| 310 | 18 | 29 February 2008 | (Finland) Lahti | Salpausselkä | HS130 / 15 km | (Norway) Petter Tande | (Germany) Eric Frenzel | (Germany) Ronny Ackermann |
| | | 1 March 2008 | (Finland) Lahti | Salpausselkä | HS130 / 7.5 km | bad weather | | |
| 311 | 19 | 8 March 2008 | (Norway) Oslo^{4} | Holmenkollbakken | HS128 / 15 km | (Austria) Bernhard Gruber | (Austria) Christoph Bieler | (Germany) Ronny Ackermann |
| 312 | 20 | 9 March 2008 | (Norway) Oslo | Holmenkollbakken | HS128 / 7.5 km | (Norway) Petter Tande | (Austria) Mario Stecher | (Austria) Bernhard Gruber |

1 = originally scheduled Gundersen method was replaced with mass start, because the track was destroyed over a strong wind. 10 km cross-country run was on 19 January 2008, but ski jumping round was postponed on the next day over a strong wind.
2 = on 27 January ski jumping round was cancelled for strong wind and fog, that's why only 7.5 km sprint was organized this day. As for final result they just added previous day competition ski jumping round.
3 = Because of the bad weather forecast they switched the disciplines. Cross-country run in the morning and ski jumping round in the afternoon.
4 = Because of the bad weather forecast ski jumping round for competition on 8 March was already organized on 7 March.

== Standings ==
=== Overall ===
| Rank | | 1 | 2 | 3 | 4 | 5 | 6 | 7 | 8 | 9 | 10 | 11 | 12 | 13 | 14 | 15 | 16 | 17 | 18 | 19 | 20 | 21 | 22 | 23 | 24 | Total |
|---|---|---|---|---|---|---|---|---|---|---|---|---|---|---|---|---|---|---|---|---|---|---|---|---|---|---|
| 1 | (Germany) Ronny Ackermann | 100 | 50 | 60 | 45 | 36 | 80 | 50 | 45 | 60 | 100 | 45 | 80 | 100 | 60 | 45 | | 60 | | | 24 | 60 | | 60 | 14 | 1174 |
| 2 | (Norway) Petter Tande | 40 | 5 | 32 | 26 | 60 | 50 | 60 | 36 | 100 | 40 | 50 | 5 | 26 | 29 | 29 | | 100 | | | 45 | 100 | | 45 | 100 | 978 |
| 3 | (United States) Bill Demong | 36 | 60 | 100 | 10 | 26 | 40 | 80 | 80 | 45 | 80 | 36 | 50 | 18 | 40 | 40 | | 40 | | | 60 | 22 | | 29 | 10 | 902 |
| 4 | (Austria) Bernhard Gruber | 32 | 36 | 36 | 60 | 80 | 26 | 24 | 32 | 2 | 32 | 26 | 26 | 45 | 32 | 80 | | 45 | | | 100 | 20 | | 100 | 60 | 894 |
| 5 | (France) Jason Lamy-Chappuis | 26 | 29 | 22 | 80 | 45 | 29 | 8 | 100 | 40 | 45 | 80 | 32 | 32 | 45 | 100 | | 15 | | | | 26 | | 13 | 9 | 776 |
| 6 | (Austria) Christoph Bieler | 60 | 24 | 40 | 100 | 40 | 36 | 9 | 50 | 12 | 2 | 32 | 1 | 2 | 100 | 60 | | 22 | | | 32 | 32 | | 80 | 32 | 766 |
| 7 | (Germany) Eric Frenzel | 50 | 20 | 50 | 50 | 24 | 14 | 40 | | 20 | | 40 | 100 | 80 | 36 | | | 50 | | | 36 | 80 | | 26 | 36 | 752 |
| 8 | (Germany) Björn Kircheisen | 18 | 100 | 80 | 36 | 100 | 100 | 29 | 15 | 36 | | | 40 | 13 | 24 | 26 | | 14 | | | | 45 | | | | 676 |
| 9 | (Norway) Magnus Moan | 16 | 26 | 24 | 12 | 32 | 45 | 100 | 60 | 50 | | | 15 | 11 | 80 | 50 | | 29 | | | 8 | 29 | | 40 | 40 | 667 |
| 10 | (Austria) David Kreiner | 14 | 16 | 45 | 24 | 50 | 9 | 45 | 40 | 26 | 11 | 60 | 45 | 60 | 10 | 32 | | 32 | | | 3 | 14 | | 36 | 50 | 622 |
| 11 | (Finland) Anssi Koivuranta | 45 | 45 | 26 | 40 | | | 20 | 24 | 22 | 24 | 18 | 60 | 24 | | | | 80 | | | | 15 | | | | 443 |
| 12 | (Germany) Tino Edelmann | 11 | 18 | 16 | 7 | 4 | 60 | 36 | 16 | 9 | 29 | 11 | 24 | 6 | 22 | 10 | | 16 | | | 10 | 13 | | 18 | 26 | 362 |
| 13 | (Japan) Norihito Kobayashi | 15 | | | 11 | 29 | 24 | 13 | 29 | 29 | 22 | 20 | 14 | 16 | 50 | 5 | | 13 | | | 18 | 40 | | | | 348 |
| 14 | (Finland) Hannu Manninen | 13 | 80 | | | | | 5 | 7 | 80 | 50 | 6 | 22 | | | 11 | | 3 | | | 6 | 50 | | | | 333 |
| 15 | (Austria) Mario Stecher | 4 | 8 | 11 | 4 | 7 | 8 | 11 | 3 | | | | | | 15 | 36 | | 8 | | | 50 | 36 | | 50 | 80 | 331 |
| 16 | (Germany) Sebastian Haseney | 12 | 22 | 13 | 5 | 20 | 15 | 32 | 22 | 14 | 60 | 100 | | | | | | | | | | 4 | | | | 319 |
| 17 | (Austria) Wilhelm Denifl | 29 | 15 | 29 | 32 | 22 | 6 | 4 | 10 | | 36 | | 29 | | | 24 | | 9 | | | 1 | | | 15 | 24 | 294 |
| 19 | (United States) Johnny Spillane | 80 | 40 | 20 | 14 | 16 | 3 | 10 | 11 | | 12 | 24 | 18 | 12 | 12 | 4 | | | | | | | | 6 | | 282 |

- Standings after 20 events.

=== Sprint ===
| Rank | | 2 | 4 | 6 | 8 | 11 | 13 | 14 | 15 | 16 | 18 | 20 | 22 | 24 | Total |
|---|---|---|---|---|---|---|---|---|---|---|---|---|---|---|---|
| 1 | (Germany) Ronny Ackermann | 50 | 45 | 80 | 45 | 45 | 100 | 60 | 45 | | | 24 | | 14 | 508 |
| 2 | (France) Jason Lamy-Chappuis | 29 | 80 | 29 | 100 | 80 | 32 | 45 | 100 | | | | | 9 | 504 |
| 3 | (Austria) Bernhard Gruber | 36 | 60 | 26 | 32 | 26 | 45 | 32 | 80 | | | 100 | | 60 | 497 |
| 4 | (Austria) Christoph Bieler | 24 | 100 | 36 | 50 | 32 | 2 | 100 | 60 | | | 32 | | 32 | 468 |
| 5 | (Norway) Petter Tande | 5 | 26 | 50 | 36 | 50 | 26 | 29 | 29 | | | 45 | | 100 | 396 |
| 6 | (United States) Bill Demong | 60 | 10 | 40 | 80 | 36 | 18 | 40 | 40 | | | 60 | | 10 | 384 |
| 7 | (Norway) Magnus Moan | 26 | 12 | 45 | 60 | | 11 | 80 | 50 | | | 8 | | 40 | 332 |
| 8 | (Germany) Björn Kircheisen | 100 | 36 | 100 | 15 | | 13 | 24 | 26 | | | | | | 314 |
| 9 | (Germany) Eric Frenzel | 20 | 50 | 14 | | 40 | 80 | 36 | | | | 36 | | 36 | 312 |
| 10 | (Austria) David Kreiner | 16 | 24 | 9 | 40 | 60 | 60 | 10 | 32 | | | 3 | | 50 | 304 |
| 11 | (Austria) Mario Stecher | 8 | 4 | 8 | 3 | | | 15 | 36 | | | 50 | | 80 | 204 |
| 12 | (Germany) Tino Edelmann | 18 | 7 | 60 | 16 | 11 | 6 | 22 | 10 | | | 10 | | 26 | 186 |
| 13 | (Japan) Norihito Kobayashi | | 11 | 24 | 29 | 20 | 16 | 50 | 5 | | | 18 | | | 173 |
| 14 | (Norway) Espen Rian | 10 | 13 | 13 | 2 | 2 | 36 | 4 | 16 | | | 29 | | 45 | 170 |
| 15 | (Germany) Sebastian Haseney | 22 | 5 | 15 | 22 | 100 | | | | | | | | | 164 |

- Standings after 10 events.

=== Nations Cup ===
| Rank | | Points |
|---|---|---|
| 1 | Germany | 3138 |
| 2 | Austria | 2423 |
| 3 | Norway | 2003 |
| 4 | Finland | 1146 |
| 5 | United States | 1139 |
| 6 | France | 905 |
| 7 | Japan | 620 |
| 8 | Switzerland | 380 |
| 9 | Czech Republic | 187 |
| 10 | Italy | 11 |
| 10 | Russia | 11 |
| 12 | Slovenia | 5 |

- Standings after 20 event.
