= Norihito =

Norihito is a common Japanese given name for males, including:

- Prince Norihito, later the Prince Takamado of Japan, grandson of Emperor Taishō
- Prince Norihito (憲仁親王 Norihito Shinnō), seventh son of Emperor Go-Shirakawa (後白河天皇 Go-Shirakawa Tennō), later Emperor Takakura (高倉天皇 Takakura Tennō), emperor of Japan
- Norihito Kobayashi (小林 範仁, born 1982), Japanese Nordic combined skier
- Norihito Kaneto (金刃 憲人, born 1984), Japanese baseball player
