= Nordic combined at the 2014 Winter Olympics =

Nordic combined at the XXII Olympic Winter Games
- Venue: RusSki Gorki Jumping Center Krasnaya Polyana, Russia
- Dates: 12–20 February 2014
- No. of events: 3
- Competitors: 55 from 15 nations

Nordic combined at the 2014 Winter Olympics was held at the RusSki Gorki Jumping Center. The three events took place between 12–20 February 2014.

== Competition schedule ==
The following is the competition schedule for all three events.

All times are (UTC+4).

Date	Time	Event
12 February	13:30	Men's individual normal hill
12 February	16:30	Men's individual normal hill 10 km
18 February	13:30	Men's individual large hill
18 February	16:00	Men's individual large hill 10 km
20 February	12:00	Men's team large hill
20 February	15:00	Men's team large hill 4 X 5 km

== Medal summary ==
=== Medal table ===
Rank	Nation	Gold	Silver	Bronze	Total
1	Norway	2	1	1	4
2	Germany	1	1	1	3
3	Japan	0	1	0	1
4	Austria	0	0	1	1
Totals (4 entries)		3	3	3	9

=== Events ===
Event	Gold		Silver		Bronze	
Individual large hill/10 km	Jørgen Graabak; Norway	23:27.5	Magnus Moan; Norway	23:28.1	Fabian Rießle; Germany	23:29.1
Individual normal hill/10 km	Eric Frenzel; Germany	23:50.20	Akito Watabe; Japan	23:54.40	Magnus Krog; Norway	23:58.30
Team large hill/4 x 5 km	Norway; Jørgen Graabak; Håvard Klemetsen; Magnus Krog; Magnus Moan	47:13.5	Germany; Eric Frenzel; Björn Kircheisen; Fabian Rießle; Johannes Rydzek	47:13.8	Austria; Christoph Bieler; Bernhard Gruber; Lukas Klapfer; Mario Stecher	47:16.9

== Qualification ==
A total of 55 quota spots were available to athletes to compete at the games. A maximum of 5 athletes could be entered by a National Olympic Committee. Competitors were eligible to compete if they have scored points at a World or Continental cup event during the qualification period of July 2012 to 19 January 2014. The top 55 on the Olympic quota allocation list respecting the maximum of 5 per country qualified to compete.

== Participating nations ==
55 athletes from 15 nations participated, with number of athletes in parentheses.

- Austria (5)
- Czech Republic (4)
- Estonia (3)
- Finland (4)
- France (5)
- Germany (5)
- Italy (5)
- Japan (5)
- Norway (5)
- Poland (1)
- Russia (4)
- Switzerland (1)
- Slovenia (3)
- Ukraine (1)
- United States (4)
