= Carina Raich =

Austrian alpine skier (born 1979)

Carina Raich (born 14 March 1979 in Arzl im Pitztal) is an Austrian former alpine skier who competed in the 2002 Winter Olympics.

Carina is the sister of Benjamin Raich. She retired in 2005 due to injuries. Since 2008, she is married to Mario Stecher.
