= Johannes Rydzek =

German Nordic combined skier (born 1991)

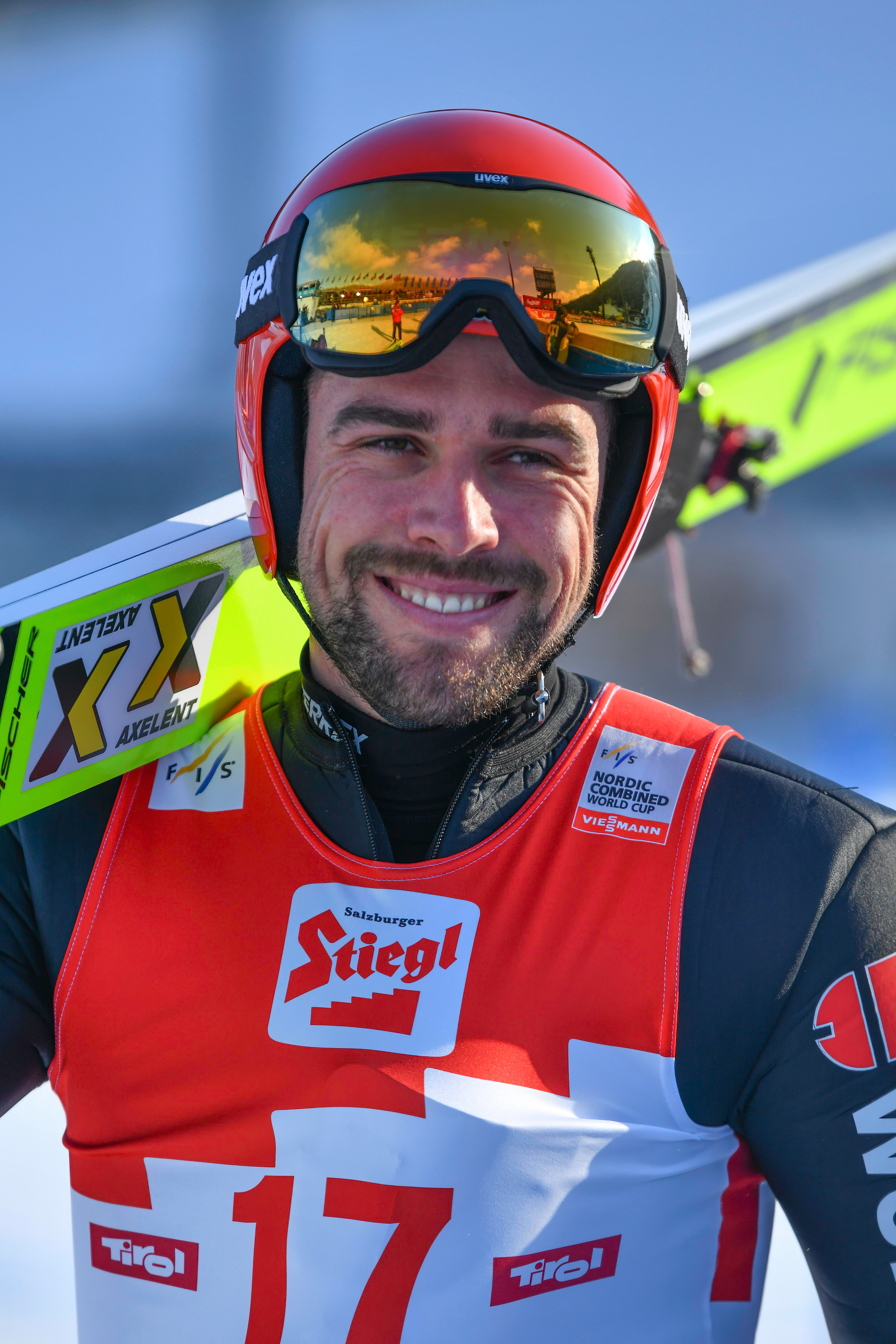
- Rydzek in 2023

Personal information
- Nationality: Germany
- Born: 9 December 1991 (age 34) Oberstdorf, Germany
- Height: 1.80 m (5 ft 11 in)

Sport
- Sport: Skiing
- Club: SC Oberstdorf

World Cup career
- Seasons: 2008–2026
- Indiv. starts: 301
- Indiv. podiums: 46
- Indiv. wins: 18

Achievements and titles
- Personal bests: 204.0 m (669.3 ft); Oberstdorf, 17 March 2022
Medal record
Men's Nordic combined
Representing Germany
Olympic Games
Gold medal – first place	2018 Pyeongchang	Individual LH
Gold medal – first place	2018 Pyeongchang	Team LH
Silver medal – second place	2014 Sochi	Team LH
Bronze medal – third place	2010 Vancouver	Team LH
World Championships
Gold medal – first place	2015 Falun	Individual NH
Gold medal – first place	2015 Falun	Team NH
Gold medal – first place	2017 Lahti	Individual NH
Gold medal – first place	2017 Lahti	Individual LH
Gold medal – first place	2017 Lahti	Team sprint
Gold medal – first place	2017 Lahti	Team NH
Gold medal – first place	2025 Trondheim	Team LH
Silver medal – second place	2011 Oslo	Individual LH
Silver medal – second place	2011 Oslo	Team NH
Silver medal – second place	2011 Oslo	Team LH
Silver medal – second place	2015 Falun	Team sprint
Silver medal – second place	2019 Seefeld	Team NH
Silver medal – second place	2023 Planica	Team LH
Bronze medal – third place	2015 Falun	Individual LH

Johannes Rydzek (German pronunciation: [joˈha.nəs ˈʁʏ.t͡sɛk]; born 9 December 1991) is a former German Nordic combined skier. He became Olympic champion on the large hill in 2018 and won six World Champion titles at the Nordic World Ski Championships in 2015 and 2017.

== Career ==
Rydzek has had a remarkable career in Nordic combined, marked by numerous accolades at the World Championships, World Cups, and the Olympics. He debuted in the World Cup in Kuusamo in 2008.

He first gained international recognition with a bronze medal in the 4 x 5 km team event at the 2010 Winter Olympics in Vancouver.

Over his career, he has secured 18 World Cup victories, with his first win in March 2011 in Lahti, Finland. That same year, he earned a silver medal in the Large Hill Gundersen event at the World Championships in Holmenkollen.

Rydzek discovered his passion for Nordic sports at an early age, starting ski jumping shortly before his fifth birthday. Inspired by his father, a volunteer at the Four Hills Tournament, and his family outings on cross-country skis, Rydzek developed a fascination for the unique combination of speed and endurance in Nordic combined.

By 2015, Rydzek had achieved unprecedented success, winning four medals at the World Championships in Falun: two gold, one silver, and one bronze, making him the most decorated athlete of the competition.

The last break-through of Johannes Rydzek in 2015 became his nomination for the main sports award in Germany: "Sportspersonality of the Year" (German: Sportler des Jahres) 2015, where he was announced as a winner together with the Nordic combined team (nomination: Team of Year) and ranked as 3rd in personal voting by German broadcaster ZDF.

In October 2016 Johannes Rydzek wins his 6th title of German Champion in the town of Oberhof.

In 2017, Rydzek was named Germany's "Sportsman of the Year" after an extraordinary season, further cementing his reputation as one of the best athletes in the sport's history.

At the 2018 Winter Olympics, Rydzek won a gold medal in the Individual Gundersen LH/10 km Cross-Country, finishing before his teammates Fabian Rießle and Eric Frenzel. This also marked the first time since 1976 that three German athletes managed to secure medals in the same Nordic combined event at Olympic Games. On 22 February he clinched another gold medal in the Men’s Team competition with Rießle, Frenzel, and Vinzenz Geiger, solidifying Germany's dominance in Nordic combined.

In recognition of his outstanding contributions to the sport, Rydzek was awarded the prestigious Holmenkollen Medal in 2021.

== Personal life ==
Rydzek is the brother of cross-country skier Coletta Rydzek.

== Record ==
=== Olympic Games ===
Event	Normal hill	Large hill	Team relay
(Canada) 2010 Vancouver	28	—	Bronze
(Russia) 2014 Sochi	6	8	Silver
(South Korea) 2018 Pyeongchang	5	Gold	Gold
(China) 2022 Beijing	5	28	—
(Italy) 2026 Milano Cortina	8	10	5

=== World Championship ===
Year	Individual LH	Individual NH	Team	Team sprint/ Mixed team
(Norway) 2011 Holmenkollen	Silver	4	Silver	Silver
(Italy) 2013 Val di Fiemme	10	30	—	—
(Sweden) 2015 Falun	Bronze	Gold	Gold	Silver
(Finland) 2017 Lahti	Gold	Gold	Gold	Gold
(Austria) 2019 Seefeld	9	8	Silver	—
(Germany) 2021 Oberstdorf	17	28	—	—
(Slovenia) 2023 Planica	16	—	Silver	—
(Norway) 2025 Trondheim	11	14	—	—

== World Cup ==
=== Individual victories ===
No.	Season	Date	Location	Discipline
1	2010–11	12 March 2011	(Finland) Lahti	HS130 / 10 km
2	2013–14	28 February 2014	(Finland) Lahti	HS130 / 10 km
3	2013–14	6 March 2014	(Norway) Trondheim	HS140 / 10 km
4	2013–14	8 March 2014	(Norway) Oslo	HS134 / 10 km
5	2014–15	29 November 2014	(Finland) Ruka	HS142 / 10 km
6	2015–16	23 February 2016	(Finland) Kuopio	HS127 / 10 km
7	2016–17	26 November 2016	(Finland) Ruka	HS142 / 10 km
8	2016–17	27 November 2016	(Finland) Ruka	HS142 / 10 km
9	2016–17	17 December 2016	(Austria) Ramsau	HS98 / 10 km
10	2016–17	21 January 2017	(France) Chaux-Neuve	HS118 / 10 km
11	2016–17	27 January 2017	(Austria) Seefeld	HS109 / 5 km
12	2016–17	28 January 2017	(Austria) Seefeld	HS109 / 10 km
13	2016–17	4 February 2017	(South Korea) PyeongChang	HS140 / 10 km
14	2016–17	5 February 2017	(South Korea) PyeongChang	HS140 / 10 km
15	2017–18	26 November 2017	(Finland) Ruka	HS142 / 10 km
16	2017–18	4 March 2018	(Finland) Lahti	HS130 / 10 km
17	2018–19	11 January 2019	(Italy) Val di Fiemme	HS135 / 10 km
18	2024–25	30 November 2024	(Finland) Ruka	HS142 / 10 km
