= FIS Nordic World Ski Championships 2013 =

2013 edition of the FIS Nordic World Ski Championships

- Official logo for the FIS Nordic World Ski Championships 2013.
- Host city: Val di Fiemme, Italy
- Nations: 56
- Events: 21
- Opening: 20 February 2013
- Closing: 3 March 2013
- Main venue: Trampolino dal Ben
- Website: Fiemme2013.com

The FIS Nordic World Ski Championships 2013 took place between 20 February and 3 March 2013 in Val di Fiemme, Italy, for the third time, the event having been hosted there previously in 1991 and 2003.

== Host selection ==
The 2013 championships had a submission deadline of 1 May 2007 to the International Ski Federation (FIS). The facility was chosen at the International Ski Congress in Cape Town, South Africa, on 29 May 2008. Five cities submitted bids for this event. This bid questionnaire used for the upcoming Nordic skiing championships was also used for the FIS Alpine World Ski Championships 2013.

City	Country	Previous championships hosted	FIS delegation visit
Falun	Sweden	1954, 1974, 1993	18–19 September 2007
Lahti	Finland	1926, 1938, 1958, 1978, 1989, 2001	17–18 September 2007
Oberstdorf	Germany	1987, 2005	20–21 August 2007
Val di Fiemme	Italy	1991, 2003	27–28 August 2007
Zakopane	Poland	1929, 1939, 1962	22–23 August 2007

The finalist cities' deadline for the application was 15 August 2007. From 20 August to 19 September 2007, the FIS Inspection group, led by Secretary-General Sarah Lewis, visited each candidate city for the FIS Nordic World Ski Championships 2013. The FIS Alpine World Ski Championships 2013 (Cortina d'Ampezzo (Italy), Schladming (Austria), St. Moritz (Switzerland), and Vail/Beaver Creek, Colorado (United States)) (The deadline for the alpine skiing championships was 31 August 2007) were visited in late 2007. This task force consisted of FIS officials and representatives of the European Broadcasting Union to review the proposed event and act as an advisory body on the feasibility of the implementation. A final report was presented to the FIS Council, FIS Technical Committee, and National Ski Associations in April 2008.

On 12–13 October 2007, delegates for the FIS Nordic World Ski Championships (five total), FIS Alpine World Ski Championships (four total), FIS Ski-Flying World Championships (two total), and FIS Freestyle World Championships (two total) met in Cape Town to review the rules regarding the promotional activities during the Congress. The decision took place in Cape Town with the 17-member FIS Council in May 2008.

The finalist candidates were posted in the 14 May 2008 FIS Newsflash in an effort to show their candidacy prior to the 29 May 2008 selection.

The winner was announced to be Val di Fiemme on the third ballot of exhaustive voting, who will host their third championships.

Voting results

City	First vote	Second vote	Final vote
Val di Fiemme	6	7	8
Falun	4	5	5
Zakopane	3	3	2
Lahti	2	1	Out
Oberstdorf	1	Out	Out

The four cities that lost the bid for the 2013 championships submitted their bids for the 2015 championships on 1 May 2009.

== Coordination group ==
=== 2008 ===
The coordination group for the event first took place on 24 September 2008. Local organization has already taken place given the area has hosted numerous World Cup events in cross-country skiing, Nordic combined, and ski jumping, along with the Tour de Ski competitions. The focus in 2008 was to develop activities for festivals leading up to and at the championships. A young team called "Vision 2013" will work with the tourism association in the Trentino to develop destination packages with the championships.

=== 2009 ===
The organizing committee for the 2009 championships in Liberec met in Oslo with the organizing committee of the 2011 championships on 20 April 2009 to discuss lessons learned. In the presentation was a comprehensive and frank analysis of the critical areas of Liberec's organization. Key success factors were detailed and lessons learned were elaborated, including several recommendations to both the 2011 championships and the organizing committee for the 2013 championships. Besides the 2009, 2011, and 2013 organizing committees in attendance, other attendees included the Norwegian Ski Federation, the European Broadcasting Union television, FIS, and the APF marketing partners. A second organizing committee meeting took place in Val di Fiemme on 3 June 2009 headed by Piero De Godenz and Angelo Corradini. In discussion was great strides in facility upgrades in time for the 2012 test events, along with legacy usage after the championships. Also included were marketing campaigns with EBU and with support from the local area. At a meeting in Cavalese on 26 October 2009, the organizing committee presented a detailed chart where each person listed had specific responsibilities. Most of coordinating group members also participated in the 1991 and 2003 championships. In January 2010, the city hosted the last two stages in the 2009–10 Tour de Ski, the 100th FIS World Cup staged by the Coordinating Group. Marketing and communications presented the event's mission and vision while the technical side involved sport structure, roads, and media broadcasting.

=== 2010 ===
At a 12 May 2010 meeting held in Cavalese, main issues dealt with were event marketing and communications. Venue construction, most notably the Predazzo ski jump renovation, was also discussed. Host broadcaster RAI presented its proposed infrastructure for broadcasting the event, including the addition fibre-optic cable for coverage. FIS Secretary-General Sarah Lewis stated that 700 people, including many youth, had volunteered for the championships as of May 2010.

== Schedule ==
All times are local.

Cross-country

Date	Time	Event
21 February	12:45	Men's & women's sprint
23 February	12:45	Women's 2x7.5 km skiathlon
23 February	14:15	Men's 2x15 km skiathlon
24 February	12:00	Men's & women's team sprint
26 February	12:45	Women's 10 km freestyle
27 February	12:45	Men's 15 km freestyle
28 February	12:45	Women's 4 x 5 km relay
1 March	13:30	Men's 4 x 10 km relay
2 March	12:15	Women's 30 km classic
3 March	12:30	Men's 50 km classic

Nordic combined

Date	Time	Event
22 February	10:00; 15:00	HS106 / 10 km
24 February	10:00; 15:00	Team HS106 / 4x5 km
28 February	10:00; 15:30	HS134 / 10 km
2 March	10:00; 15:00	Team sprint HS134 / 2x7.5 km

Ski jumping

Date	Time	Event
22 February	16:00	Women's HS106
23 February	17:00	Men's HS106
24 February	17:00	Team mix HS106
28 February	17:00	Men's HS134
2 March	16:30	Men's team HS134

== Events ==
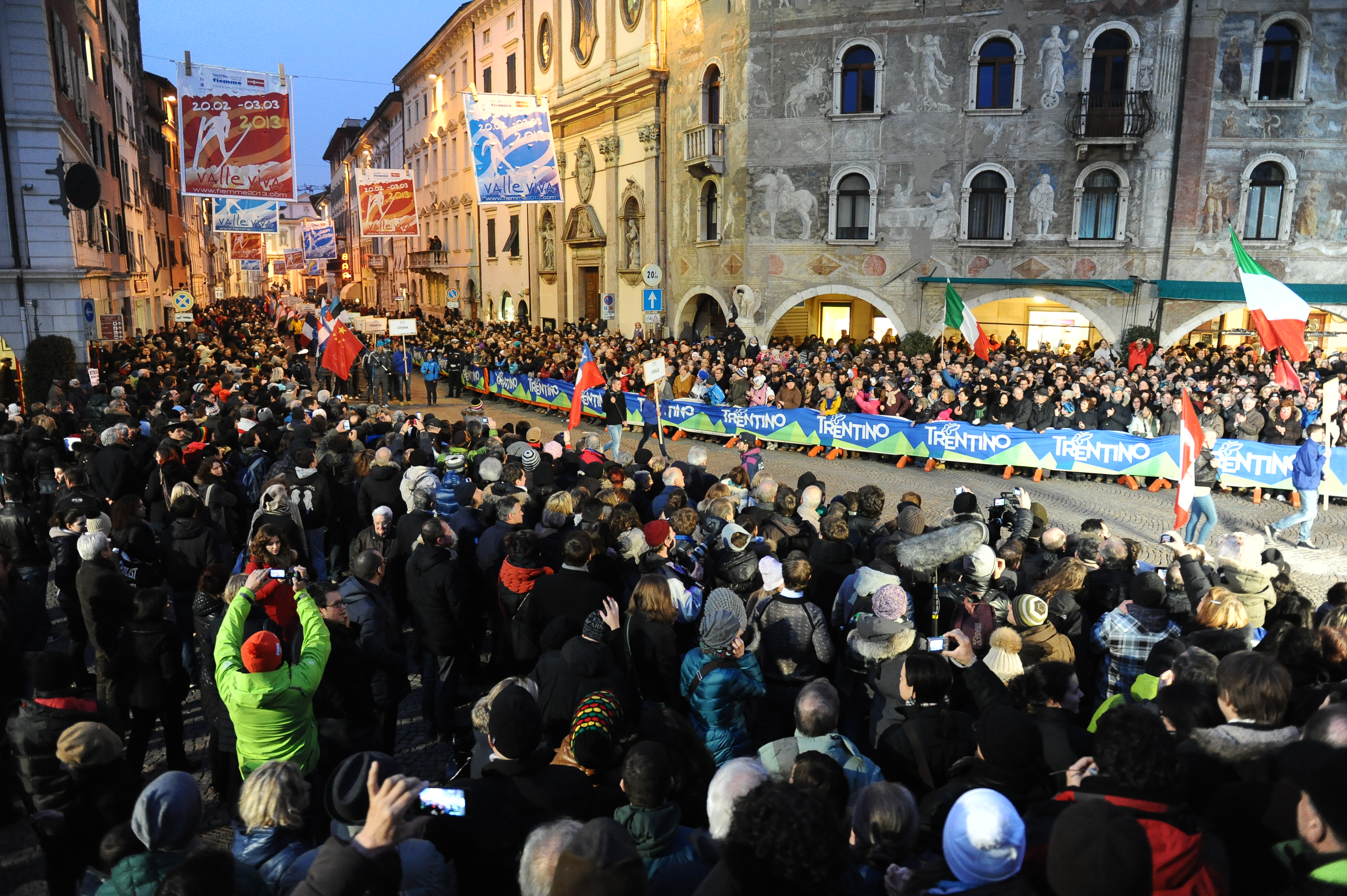
Opening ceremony

=== Cross-country skiing ===
==== Men's ====
Event	Gold		Silver		Bronze	
15 kilometre freestyle interval start	Petter Northug; Norway	34:37.1	Johan Olsson; Sweden	34:48.9	Tord Asle Gjerdalen; Norway	34:59.4
30 kilometre pursuit	Dario Cologna; Switzerland	1:13:09.3	Martin Johnsrud Sundby; Norway	1:13:11.1	Sjur Røthe; Norway	1:13:11.3
50 kilometre classical mass start	Johan Olsson; Sweden	2:10:41.4	Dario Cologna; Switzerland	2:10:54.3	Alexey Poltoranin; Kazakhstan	2:10:58.2
4 × 10 kilometre relay	Norway; Tord Asle Gjerdalen; Eldar Rønning; Sjur Røthe; Petter Northug	1:41:37.2	Sweden; Daniel Richardsson; Johan Olsson; Marcus Hellner; Calle Halfvarsson	1:41:38.4	Russia; Evgeniy Belov; Maxim Vylegzhanin; Alexander Legkov; Sergey Ustiugov	1:41:39.6
Sprint	Nikita Kriukov; Russia	3:30.4	Petter Northug; Norway	3:30.8	Alex Harvey; Canada	3:31.2
Team sprint	Russia; Alexei Petukhov; Nikita Kriukov	21:30.98	Sweden; Marcus Hellner; Emil Jönsson	21:31.44	Kazakhstan; Nikolay Chebotko; Alexey Poltoranin	21:31.71

==== Women's ====
Event	Gold		Silver		Bronze	
10 kilometre freestyle interval start	Therese Johaug; Norway	25:23.4	Marit Bjørgen; Norway	25:33.6	Yuliya Chekaleva; Russia	25:56.1
15 kilometre pursuit	Marit Bjørgen; Norway	39:04.4	Therese Johaug; Norway	39:07.8	Heidi Weng; Norway	39:19.3
30 kilometre classical mass start	Marit Bjørgen; Norway	1:27:19.9	Justyna Kowalczyk; Poland	1:27:23.6	Therese Johaug; Norway	1:27:28.6
4 × 5 kilometre relay	Norway; Heidi Weng; Therese Johaug; Kristin Størmer Steira; Marit Bjørgen	1:00:36.5	Sweden; Ida Ingemarsdotter; Emma Wikén; Anna Haag; Charlotte Kalla	1:01:02.7	Russia; Julia Ivanova; Alia Iksanova; Mariya Guschina; Yuliya Chekaleva	1:01:22.3
Sprint	Marit Bjørgen; Norway	3:16.6	Ida Ingemarsdotter; Sweden	3:18.9	Maiken Caspersen Falla; Norway	3:20.4
Team sprint	United States; Jessie Diggins; Kikkan Randall	20:24.44	Sweden; Charlotte Kalla; Ida Ingemarsdotter	20:32.24	Finland; Riikka Sarasoja-Lilja; Krista Lahteenmäki	20:35.59

=== Nordic combined ===
Event	Gold		Silver		Bronze	
Individual large hill/10 km	Eric Frenzel; Germany	27:22.8	Bernhard Gruber; Austria	27:59.5	Jason Lamy-Chappuis; France	28:00.0
Individual normal hill/10 km	Jason Lamy-Chappuis; France	29:13.2	Mario Stecher; Austria	29:13.4	Björn Kircheisen; Germany	29:13.5
Team normal hill/4 × 5 km	France; François Braud; Maxime Laheurte; Sébastien Lacroix; Jason Lamy-Chappuis	57:34.0	Norway; Jørgen Gråbak; Håvard Klemetsen; Magnus Krog; Magnus Moan	57:34.4	United States; Taylor Fletcher; Bryan Fletcher; Todd Lodwick; Bill Demong	57:38.2
Team sprint large hill/2 × 7,5 km	France; Sébastien Lacroix; Jason Lamy-Chappuis	35:37.9	Austria; Wilhelm Denifl; Bernhard Gruber	35:54.5	Germany; Tino Edelmann; Eric Frenzel	36:21.8

=== Ski jumping ===
==== Men's ====
Event	Gold		Silver		Bronze	
Men's individual normal hill (HS106)	Anders Bardal; Norway	252.6	Gregor Schlierenzauer; Austria	248.4	Peter Prevc; Slovenia	244.3
Men's individual large hill (HS134)	Kamil Stoch; Poland	295.8	Peter Prevc; Slovenia	289.7	Anders Jacobsen; Norway	289.1
Men's team large hill (HS134)	Austria; Wolfgang Loitzl; Manuel Fettner; Thomas Morgenstern; Gregor Schlierenzauer	1135.9	Germany; Andreas Wank; Severin Freund; Michael Neumayer; Richard Freitag	1121.8	Poland; Maciej Kot; Piotr Żyła; Dawid Kubacki; Kamil Stoch	1121.0

==== Women's ====
Event	Gold		Silver		Bronze	
Women's individual normal hill (HS106)	Sarah Hendrickson; United States	253.7	Sara Takanashi; Japan	251.0	Jacqueline Seifriedsberger; Austria	237.2

==== Mixed ====
Event	Gold		Silver		Bronze	
Mixed team normal hill (HS106)	Japan; Yuki Ito; Daiki Ito; Sara Takanashi; Taku Takeuchi	1011.0	Austria; Chiara Hölzl; Thomas Morgenstern; Jacqueline Seifriedsberger; Gregor Schlierenzauer	986.7	Germany; Ulrike Gräßler; Richard Freitag; Carina Vogt; Severin Freund	984.9

== Medal table ==
Rank	Nation	Gold	Silver	Bronze	Total
1	Norway	8	5	6	19
2	France	3	0	1	4
3	Russia	2	0	3	5
4	United States	2	0	1	3
5	Sweden	1	6	0	7
6	Austria	1	5	1	7
7	Germany	1	1	3	5
8	Poland	1	1	1	3
9	Japan	1	1	0	2
9	Switzerland	1	1	0	2
11	Slovenia	0	1	1	2
12	Kazakhstan	0	0	2	2
13	Canada	0	0	1	1
13	Finland	0	0	1	1
Totals (14 entries)		21	21	21	63

== Participating nations ==
700 athletes 56 countries are scheduled to compete, an increase of 6 from 2011. Togo is scheduled to make its debut appearance.

- Algeria
- Argentina
- Armenia
- Australia
- Austria
- Belarus
- Belgium
- Bosnia and Herzegovina
- Brazil
- Bulgaria
- Canada
- Chile
- China
- Croatia
- Czech Republic
- Denmark
- Estonia
- Finland
- France
- Germany
- Great Britain
- Greece
- Hungary
- Iceland
- India
- Iran
- Ireland
- Italy
- Japan
- Kazakhstan
- Kyrgyzstan
- Latvia
- Lithuania
- Luxembourg
- Macedonia
- Moldova
- Mongolia
- Nepal
- Netherlands
- New Zealand
- Norway
- Peru
- Poland
- Romania
- Russia
- Serbia
- Slovakia
- Slovenia
- South Korea
- Spain
- Sweden
- Switzerland
- Togo
- Ukraine
- United States
- Venezuela
