= Jonathan Felisaz =

French Nordic combined skier (born 1985)

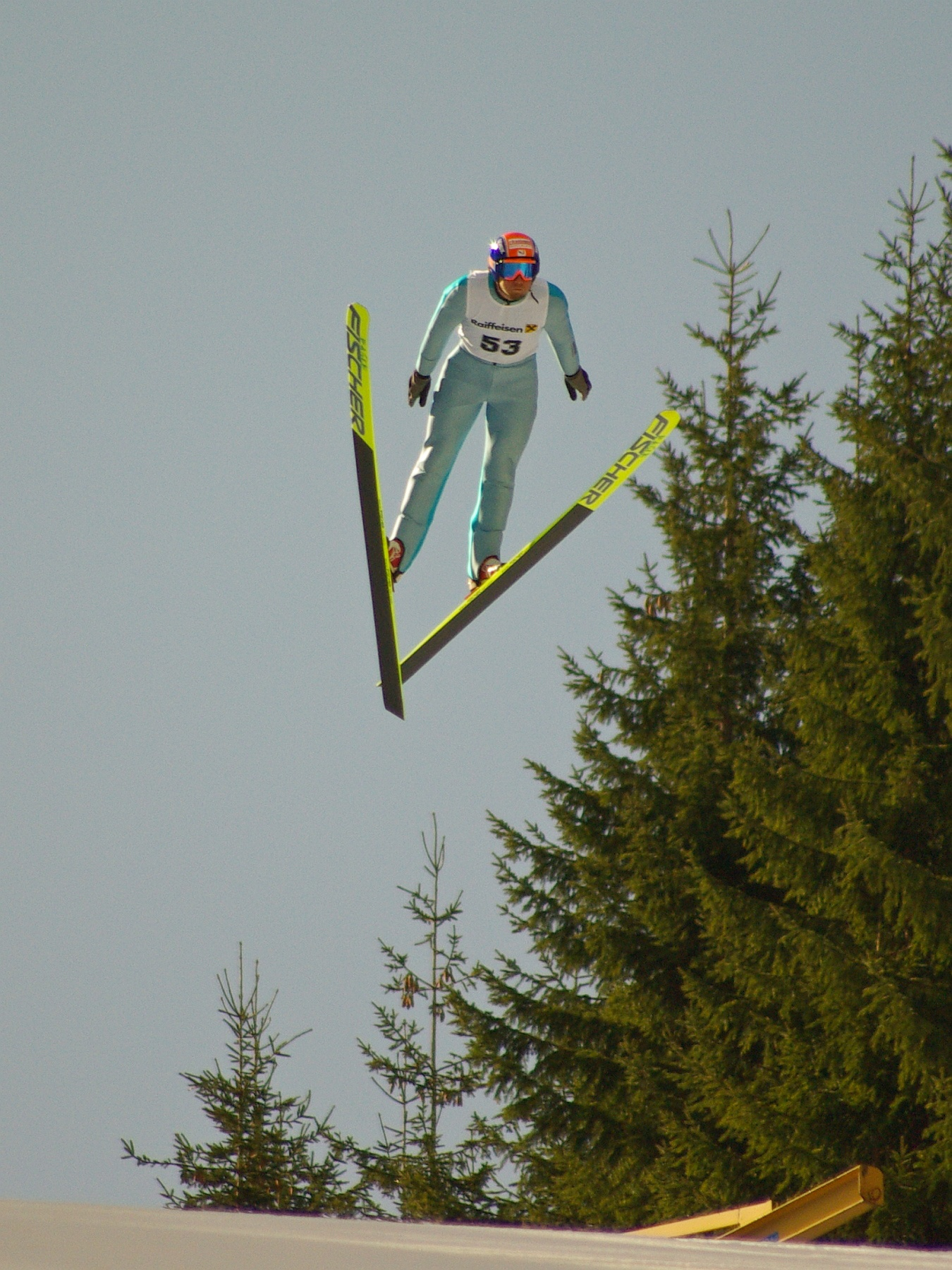
Jonathan Felisaz in March 2008

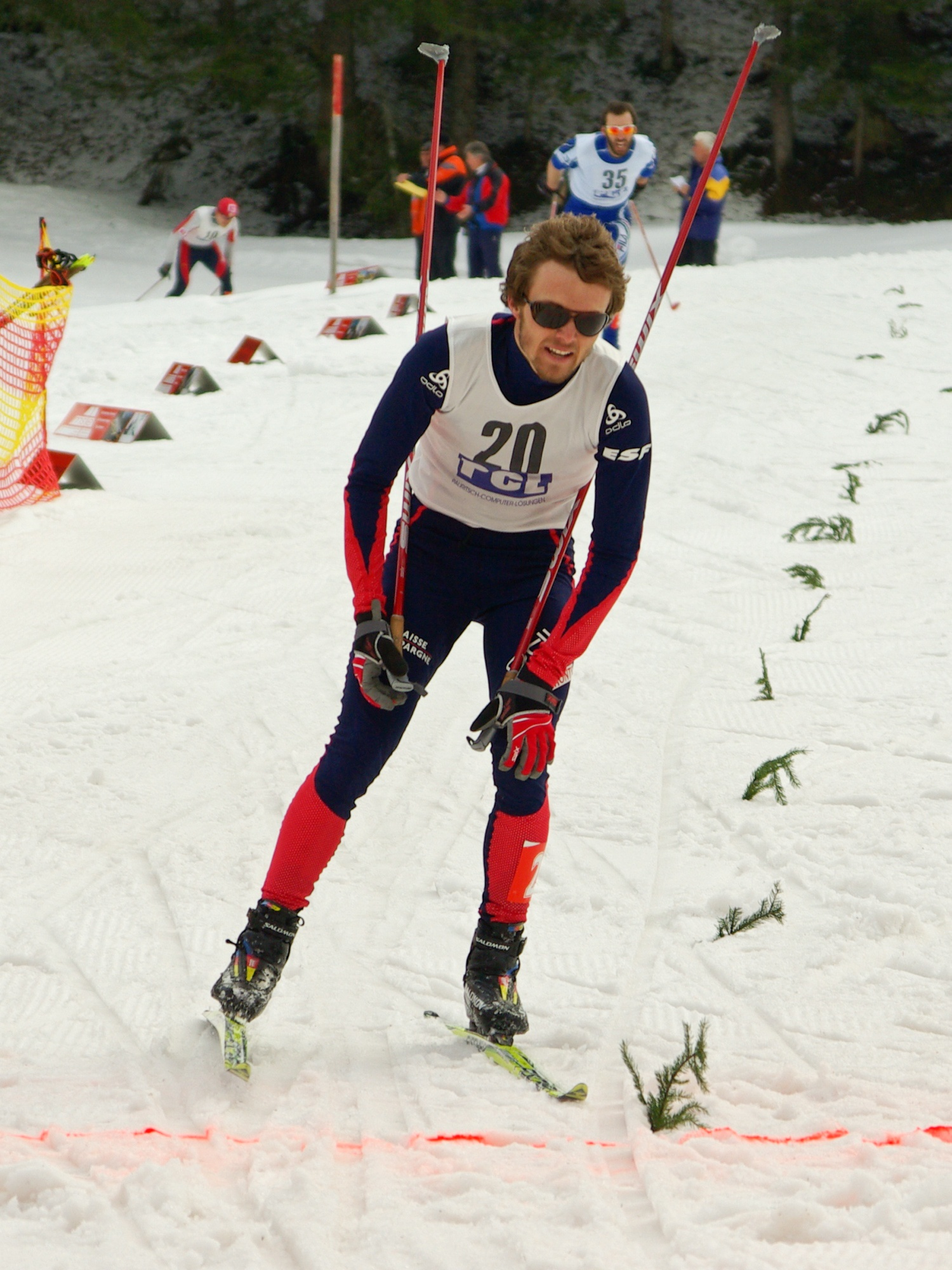
Jonathan Felisaz in March 2008

Jonathan Felisaz (born 26 October 1985) is a French Nordic combined skier who has competed since 2003. He finished 30th in the 10 km individual normal hill event at the 2010 Winter Olympics in Vancouver, British Columbia, Canada.

At the FIS Nordic World Ski Championships 2009 in Liberec, Felisaz finished 32nd in the 10 km mass start and 40th in the 10 km individual normal hill events.

His best World Cup finish was second in a 4 x 5 km team event in Germany in January 2010 while his best individual finish was 12th in a normal hill Gundersen event in France that same month.
