= Seppi Hurschler =

Swiss Nordic combined skier

Josef "Seppi" Hurschler (born 23 June 1983 in Stans) is a Swiss Nordic combined skier who has competed since 2001. Competing in three Winter Olympics, he earned his best finish of ninth in the 4 × 5 km team event at Vancouver in 2010 while earning his best individual finish of 22nd in the 15 km individual at Turin in 2006.

Hurschler's best finish at the FIS Nordic World Ski Championships was fifth in the 4 × 5 km team event at Sapporo in 2007 while his best individual finish was 17th in the 15 km individual event at those same championships.

His best World Cup finish was fourth in a 10 km individual normal hill event in Austria in 2010.
