= Gašper Berlot =

Slovenian Nordic combined skier (born 1990)

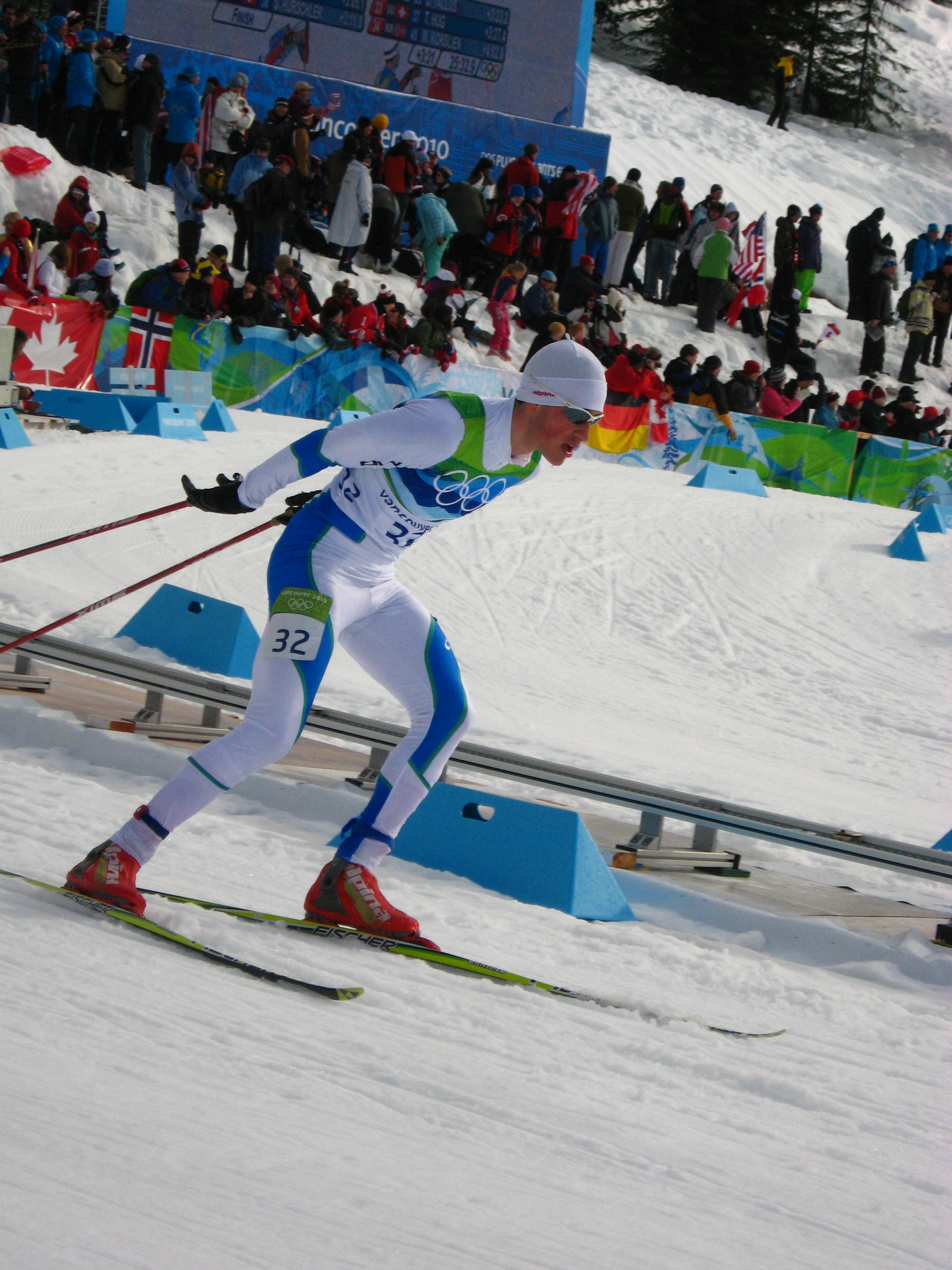
Gašper Berlot at the 2010 Winter Olympics.

Gašper Berlot (born 6 August 1990) is a Slovenian Nordic combined skier who has competed since 2006. At the 2010 Winter Olympics in Vancouver, he finished 37th in both the 10 km individual large hill and the 10 km individual normal hill events.

At the FIS Nordic World Ski Championships 2009 in Liberec, Berlot finished 26th in the 10 km individual large hill event, 38th in the 10 km individual normal hill events, and 40th in the 10 km mass start events.

His best World Cup finish was 29th in a 10 km individual normal hill event at Germany in 2010.
