= David Kreiner =

Austrian Nordic combined skier

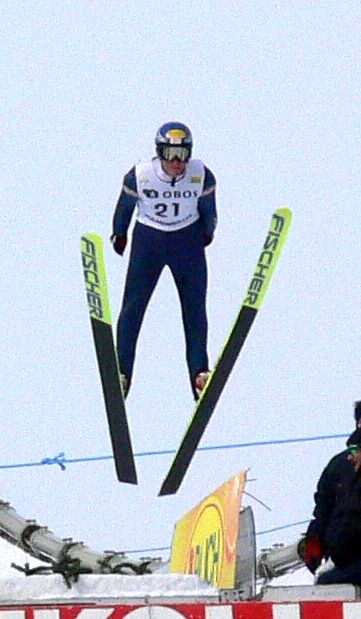

Medal record

Men's Nordic combined

Representing Austria

Winter Olympics
| Gold medal – first place | 2010 Vancouver | 4 x 5 km team |

World Championships
| Gold medal – first place | 2011 Oslo | 4 x 5 km team normal hill |
| Gold medal – first place | 2011 Oslo | 4 x 5 km team large hill |
| Silver medal – second place | 2001 Lahti | 4 x 5 km team |
| Bronze medal – third place | 2005 Oberstdorf | 4 x 5 km team |

David Kreiner (born 8 March 1981 in Kitzbühel) is an Austrian Nordic combined skier who has competed since 1998. At the 2010 Winter Olympics, he won gold in the 4 x 5 team event.

Kreiner also won two medals in the 4 x 5 km team event at the FIS Nordic World Ski Championships, one silver (2001) and one bronze (2005). His best individual finish was ninth twice (7.5 km sprint: 2007, 15 km individual: 2001).

He has had five individual career victories from 2001 to 2007.
