= Taihei Kato =

Japanese Nordic combined skier (born 1984)

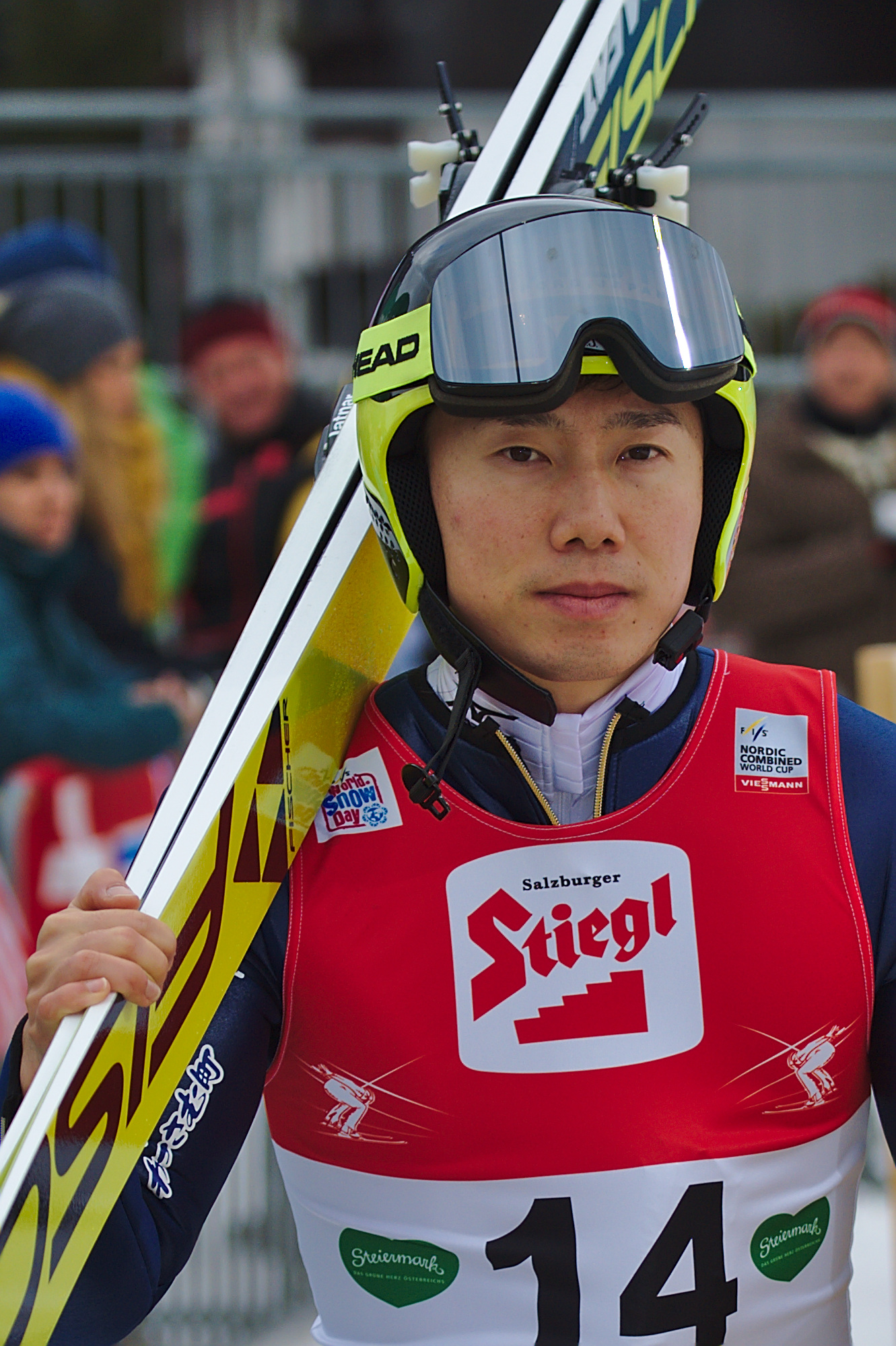

Medal record

Men's Nordic combined

Representing Japan

World Championships
Gold medal – first place	2009 Liberec	4 x 5 km team

Taihei Kato (加藤大平, Katō Taihei; born July 30, 1984) is a Japanese Nordic combined skier who has been competing since 2003. He won a gold medal in the 4 x 5 km team event at the FIS Nordic World Ski Championships 2009 in Liberec and earned his best individual finish of 27th twice (10 km mass start: 2009, 15 km individual: 2007).

At the 2010 Winter Olympics in Vancouver, Kato finished sixth in the 4 x 5 km team, 24th in the individual normal hill, and 30th in the individual large hill events.

Kato suffered a broken left arm after a fall while competing in the Nordic combined event during the Sochi Winter Olympic Games. After a seemingly successfully jump on the large hill, Kato's left ski came loose seconds after he landed, causing him to fall at high speed, sustaining the injury in the process. He was unable to continue in the competition, which would include a 10 km cross-country ski race.
