= Aleš Vodseďálek =

Czech Nordic combined skier

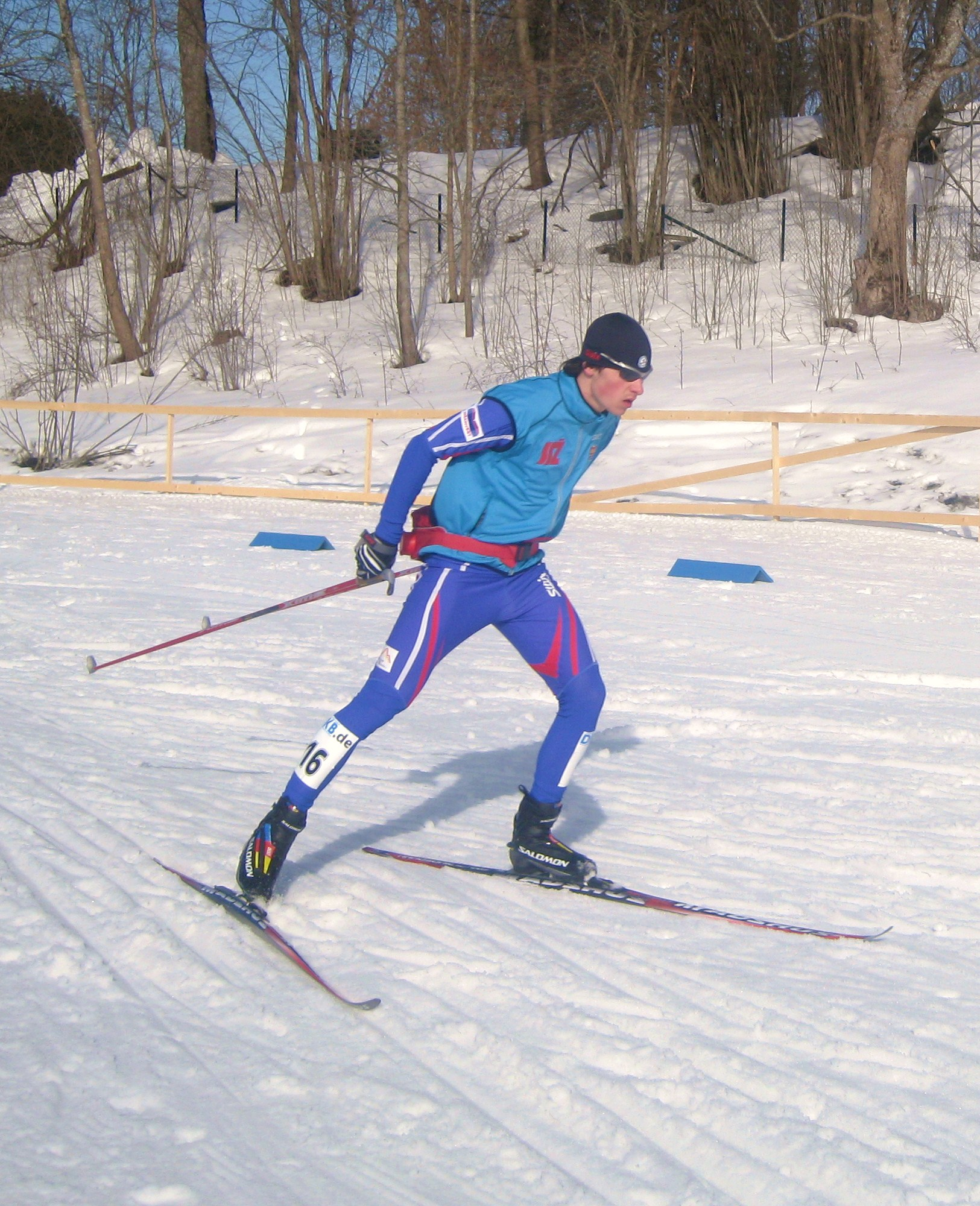
Aleš Vodseďálek in 2009

Aleš Vodseďálek (Czech pronunciation: [ˈalɛʃ ˈvotsɛɟaːlɛk]; born 5 March 1985) is a Czech Nordic combined skier who has competed since 2003.

== Career ==
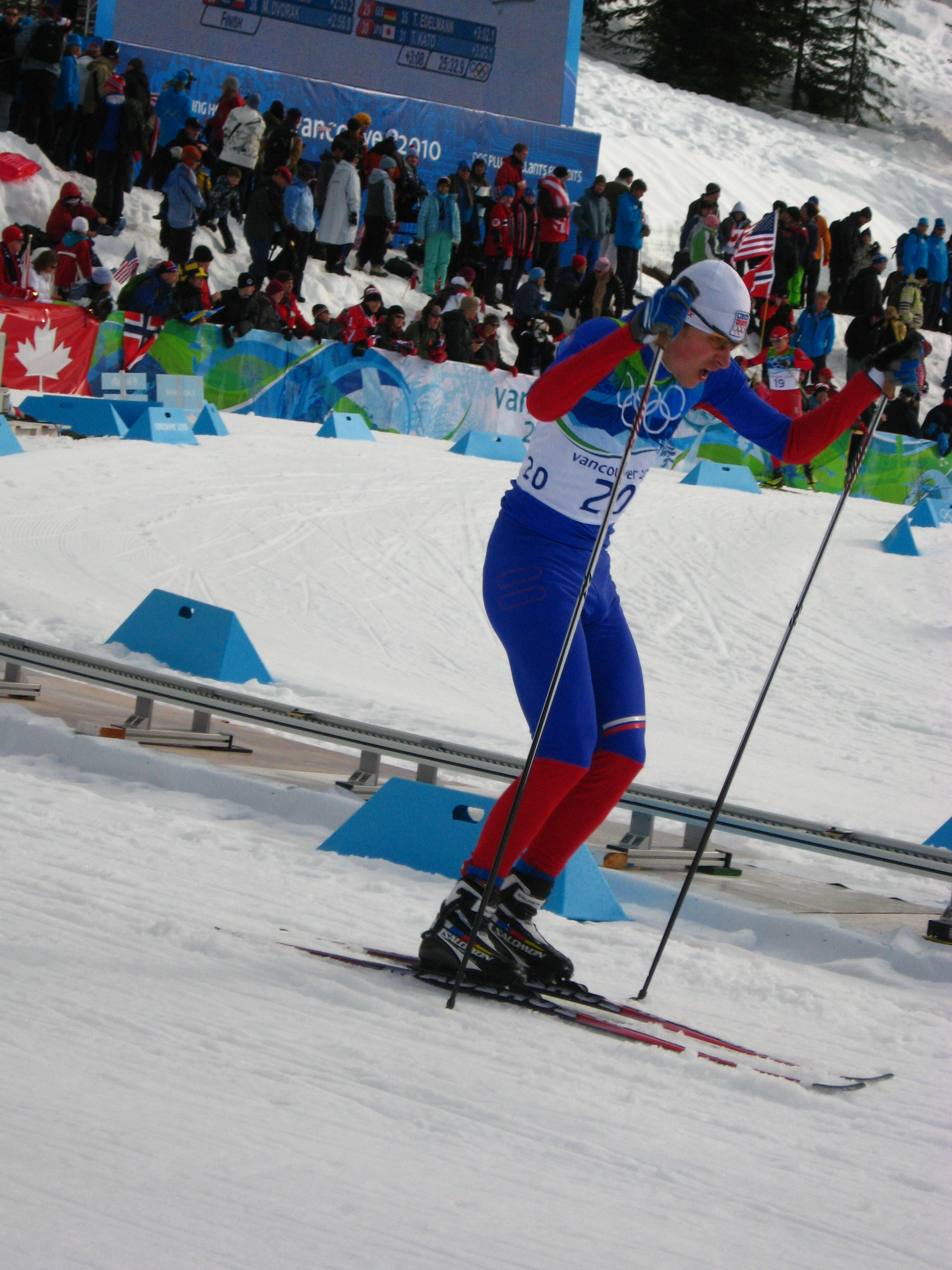
Vodseďálek at the 2010 Winter Olympics during 10 km individual large hill event

Competing in two Winter Olympics, Vodseďálek earned his best finish of eighth twice (4 x 5 km team: 2006, 2010). His best finish at the FIS Nordic World Ski Championships was sixth in the 4 x 5 km team event at Liberec in 2009 while his best individual finish was 31st in the individual large hill event at those same games.

His best World Cup finish was eighth in a 4 x 5 km team event at Germany in 2009 while his best individual finish was 23rd in an individual large hill event at Finland that same year.
