= Mario Stecher =

Austrian Nordic combined skier

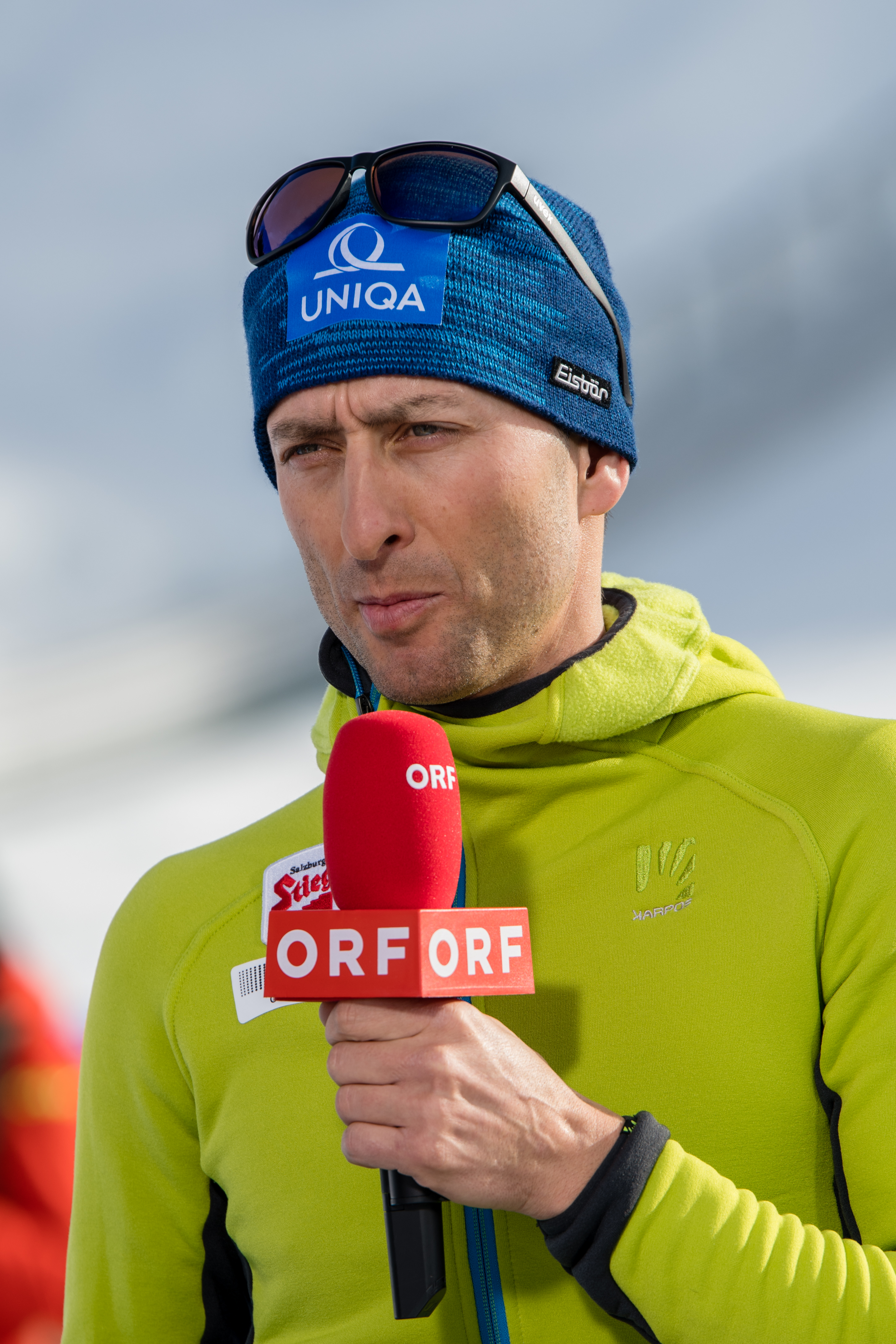
- Stecher in 2018

Medal record

Men's Nordic combined

Representing Austria

Olympic Games
Gold medal – first place	2006 Turin	4 x 5 km team
Gold medal – first place	2010 Vancouver	4 x 5 km team
Bronze medal – third place	2002 Salt Lake City	4 x 5 km team
Bronze medal – third place	2014 Sochi	4 x 5 km team

World Championships
Gold medal – first place	2011 Oslo	4 x 5 km team normal hill
Gold medal – first place	2011 Oslo	4 x 5 km team large hill
Silver medal – second place	1999 Ramsau	7.5 km sprint
Silver medal – second place	2001 Lahti	4 x 5 km team
Silver medal – second place	2013 Val di Flemme	10 km normal hill
Bronze medal – third place	1997 Trondheim	4 x 5 km team

Mario Stecher (born 17 July 1977, in Eisenerz) is an Austrian former Nordic combined skier. Competing in six Winter Olympics, he won three medals in the 4 x 5 km team event with two golds (2006, 2010) and a bronze (2002). Stecher's best individual finish was fifth in the 10 km individual normal hill event at Vancouver in 2010.

He won six medals at the FIS Nordic World Ski Championships with two gold, three silvers (7.5 km sprint: 1999, 4 x 5 km team: 2001) and a bronze (4 x 5 km team: 1997).

Stecher has a total of nine World Cup victories since 1994, including the Nordic combined event at the Holmenkollen ski festival that same year. Being 16 years old, he was the youngest winner on the Holmenkollen.

On February 27, 2015, he announced his retirement, after he was not nominated by the Austrian Ski Federation to compete in the FIS Nordic Skiing World Championships 2015 in Falun.

He married fellow skier Carina Raich in 2008.

Olympic Games
Preceded by Andreas Linger and Wolfgang Linger	Flagbearer for Austria; Sochi 2014	Succeeded by Anna Veith
