= Tommy Schmid =

Swiss Nordic combined skier

Tommy Schmid (born 12 April 1988) is a Swiss Nordic combined skier who has been competing since 2005. At the 2010 Winter Olympics in Vancouver, he finished ninth in the 4 x 5 km team, 16th in the 10 km individual large hill, and 40th in the individual large hill events.

Schmid best World Cup finish was second in 7.5 km sprint event in Poland in 2008.
