= Magnus Moan =

Norwegian Nordic combined skier

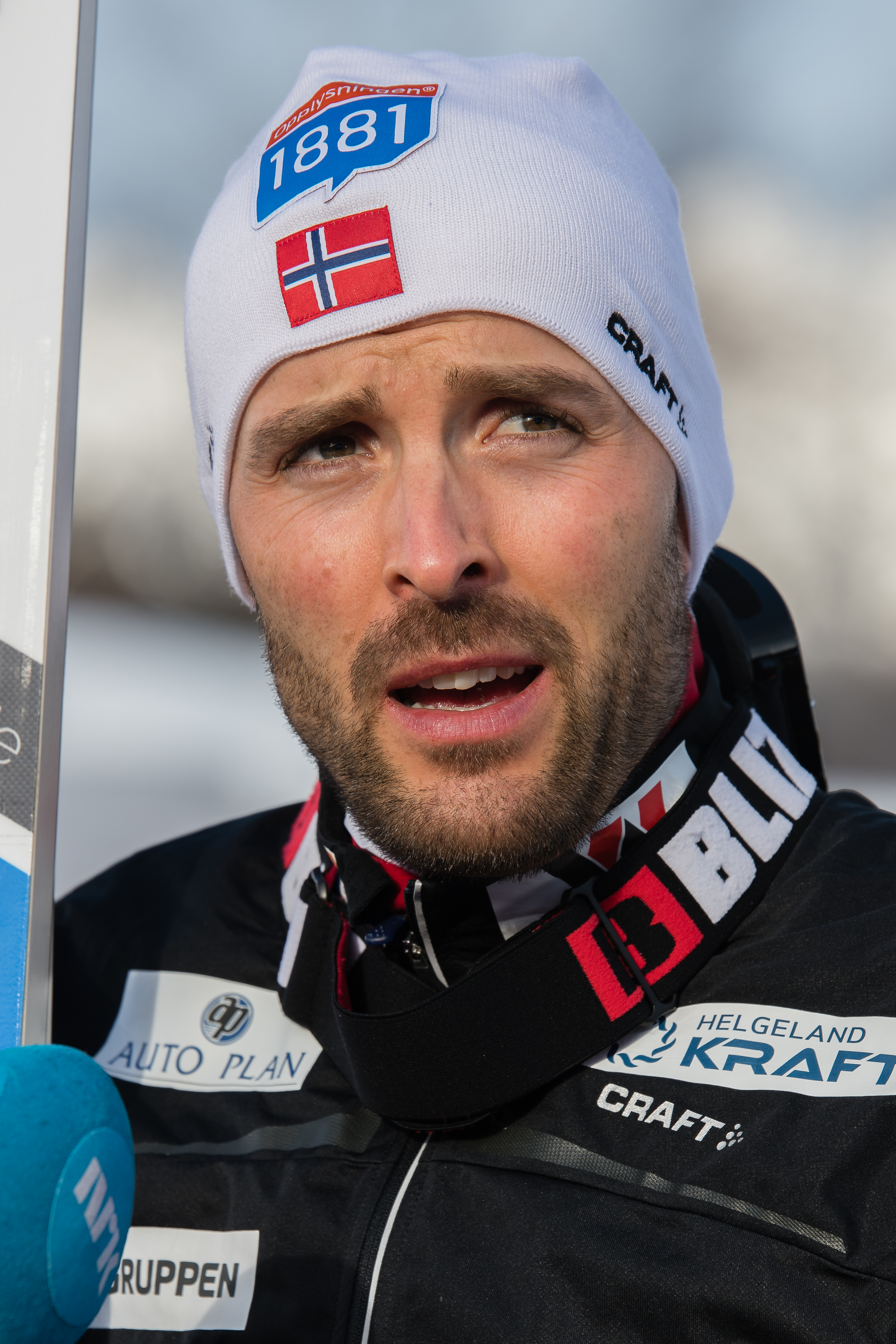
- Magnus Moan on the first day of the Nordic Combined Triple 2018

Personal information
- Full name: Magnus Hovdal Moan
- Nationality: Norway
- Born: 26 August 1983 (age 42) Lillehammer, Norway
- Height: 1.89 m (6 ft 2 in)

Sport
- Sport: Skiing
- Club: Byåsen IL

World Cup career
- Seasons: 2002–2019
- Indiv. podiums: 54
- Indiv. wins: 25
Medal record
Olympic Games
Gold medal – first place	2014 Sochi	4 x 5 km team
Silver medal – second place	2006 Turin	7.5 km sprint
Silver medal – second place	2014 Sochi	10 km sprint
Bronze medal – third place	2006 Turin	15 km individual
World Championships
Gold medal – first place	2005 Oberstdorf	4 x 5 km team
Silver medal – second place	2005 Oberstdorf	7.5 km sprint
Silver medal – second place	2007 Sapporo	7.5 km sprint
Silver medal – second place	2013 Val di Flemme	Team normal hill
Silver medal – second place	2015 Falun	4 x 5 km team
Silver medal – second place	2017 Lahti	4 x 5 km team
Silver medal – second place	2017 Lahti	Team sprint
Bronze medal – third place	2007 Sapporo	4 x 5 km team
Bronze medal – third place	2009 Liberec	4 x 5 km team
Bronze medal – third place	2011 Oslo	4 x 5 km team normal hill
Bronze medal – third place	2011 Oslo	4 x 5 km team large hill
Bronze medal – third place	2015 Falun	Team sprint

Magnus Hovdal Moan (born 26 August 1983) is a retired Norwegian Nordic combined skier who has competed since 2002 until 2019.

== Background ==
Magnus moved from Lillehammer when he was two years old and has lived in Trondheim ever since. He skis with the Byåsen IL club. When he is not training or competing Moan works for a company called Doka Norge A/S. It is a sister-company of Doka Austria. They rent/sell shuttering accessories to building constructors. Moan is 6 ft 2 in (189 cm) tall, his weight is 11 st 4 lb (158 lb; 72 kg).

== Career ==
Moan finished second in the 2005–06 FIS Nordic Combined World Cup. Moan is a solid ski jumper, but his strength lies in his cross-country skiing. He won one world cup event in the 2005–06 season, in the sprint in Ramsau am Dachstein, Austria, and finished a race outside of the top eight only once this season. In the 2004–05 season, he finished fifth, eighth in the 2003–04 season, and forty-first in the 2002–03 season.

Moan won an Olympic bronze medal in the Nordic combined on 11 February 2006 in the 15 km individual. He jumped 97.5 m and 97 m scoring 237.5 points after both jumps, leaving him one minute, forty seconds behind Georg Hettich, who won the ski jumping phase. He then skied the 15 km race in 39:44.6, 16.2 seconds behind the winner Hettich, beating fellow countryman Petter Tande in a photo finish. On 21 February 2006, Moan won a silver in the 7.5 km sprint. He completed the race in 18:34.4, 5.4 seconds behind winner Felix Gottwald of Austria.

Moan also has five medals at the FIS Nordic World Ski Championships with one gold (4 x 5 km team: 2005), two silvers (7.5 km sprint: 2005, 2007), and two bronzes (4 x 5 km team: 2007 and 2009). He also won the individual Nordic combined event at the Holmenkollen ski festival in 2005.
