= Björn Kircheisen =

German Nordic combined skier

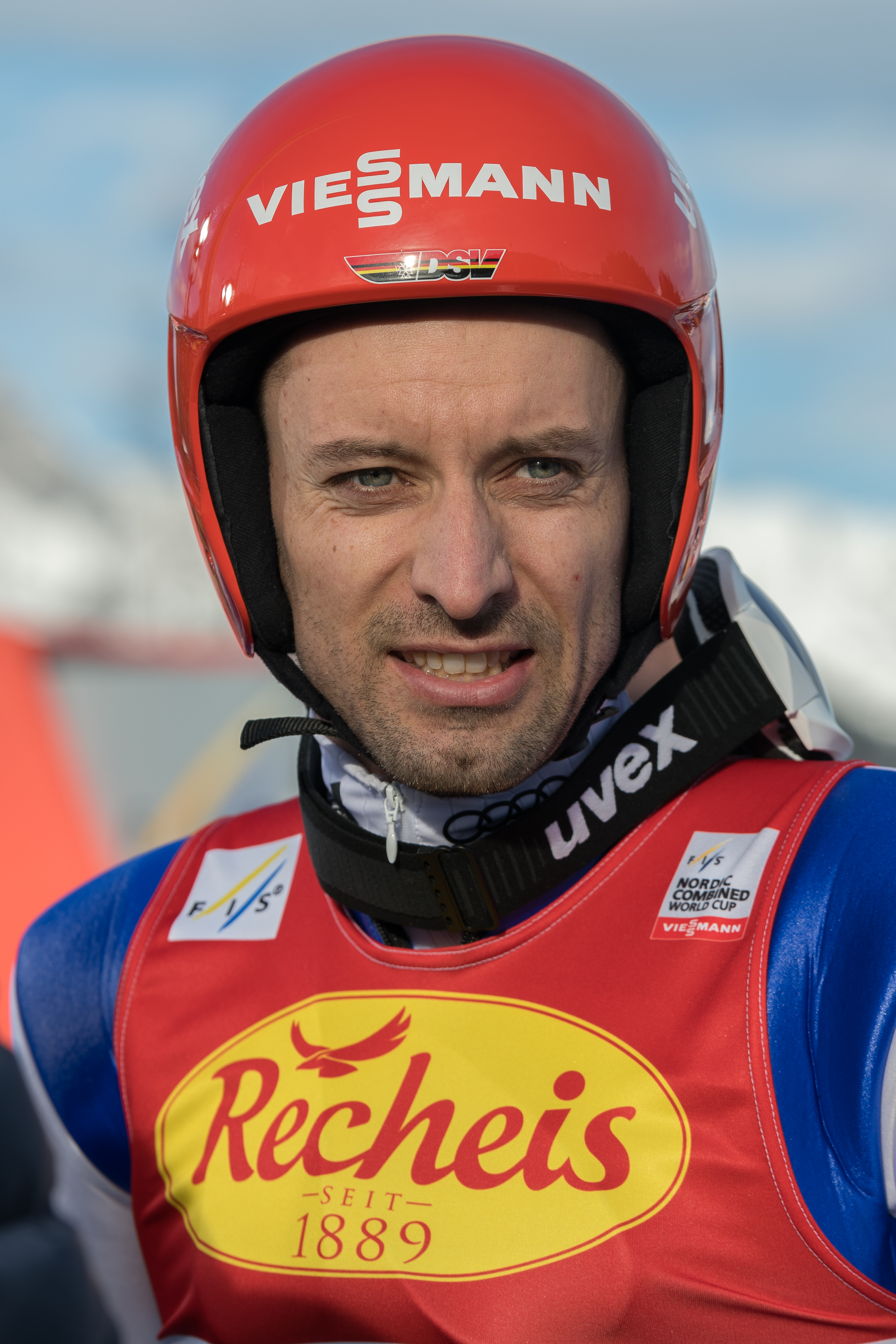

Personal information
- Born: 6 August 1983 (age 42) Erlabrunn, East Germany

Sport
- Sport: Skiing
- Club: WSV Johanngeorgenstadt

World Cup career
- Seasons: 2003-2018
- Indiv. starts: 281
- Indiv. podiums: 45
- Indiv. wins: 17
Medal record
Men's Nordic combined
Representing Germany
Olympic Games
Silver medal – second place	2002 Salt Lake City	4 x 5 km team
Silver medal – second place	2006 Turin	4 x 5 km team
Silver medal – second place	2014 Sochi	4 × 5 km team
Bronze medal – third place	2010 Vancouver	4 x 5 km team
World Championships
Gold medal – first place	2017 Lahti	4 x 5 km team NH
Silver medal – second place	2003 Val di Fiemme	4 x 5 km team
Silver medal – second place	2005 Oberstdorf	15 km individual
Silver medal – second place	2005 Oberstdorf	4 x 5 km team
Silver medal – second place	2007 Sapporo	4 x 5 km team
Silver medal – second place	2009 Liberec	4 x 5 km team
Silver medal – second place	2009 Liberec	10 km individual LH
Silver medal – second place	2011 Oslo	4 x 5 km team NH
Silver medal – second place	2011 Oslo	4 x 5 km team LH
Bronze medal – third place	2007 Sapporo	7.5 km sprint
Bronze medal – third place	2013 Val di Flemme	10 km NH
Bronze medal – third place	2017 Lahti	10 km individual NH

Björn Kircheisen (also spelled Bjoern; born 6 August 1983 in Erlabrunn) is a German former Nordic combined skier. He won four 4 x 5 km team medals at the Winter Olympics with three silvers (2002, 2006, 2014) and a bronze (2010).

Kircheisen also won ten medals at the FIS Nordic World Ski Championships with eight silvers (10 km individual large hill: 2009, 15 km individual: 2005, 4 x 5 km team: 2003, 2005, 2007, 2009) and two bronze (7.5 km sprint: 2007). He also won the Nordic combined 7.5 km sprint event at the 2006 Holmenkollen ski festival.

At the FIS Nordic Junior World Ski Championships, he won six gold medals, the most by any athlete in history.
