= Jason Lamy-Chappuis =

French Nordic combined skier

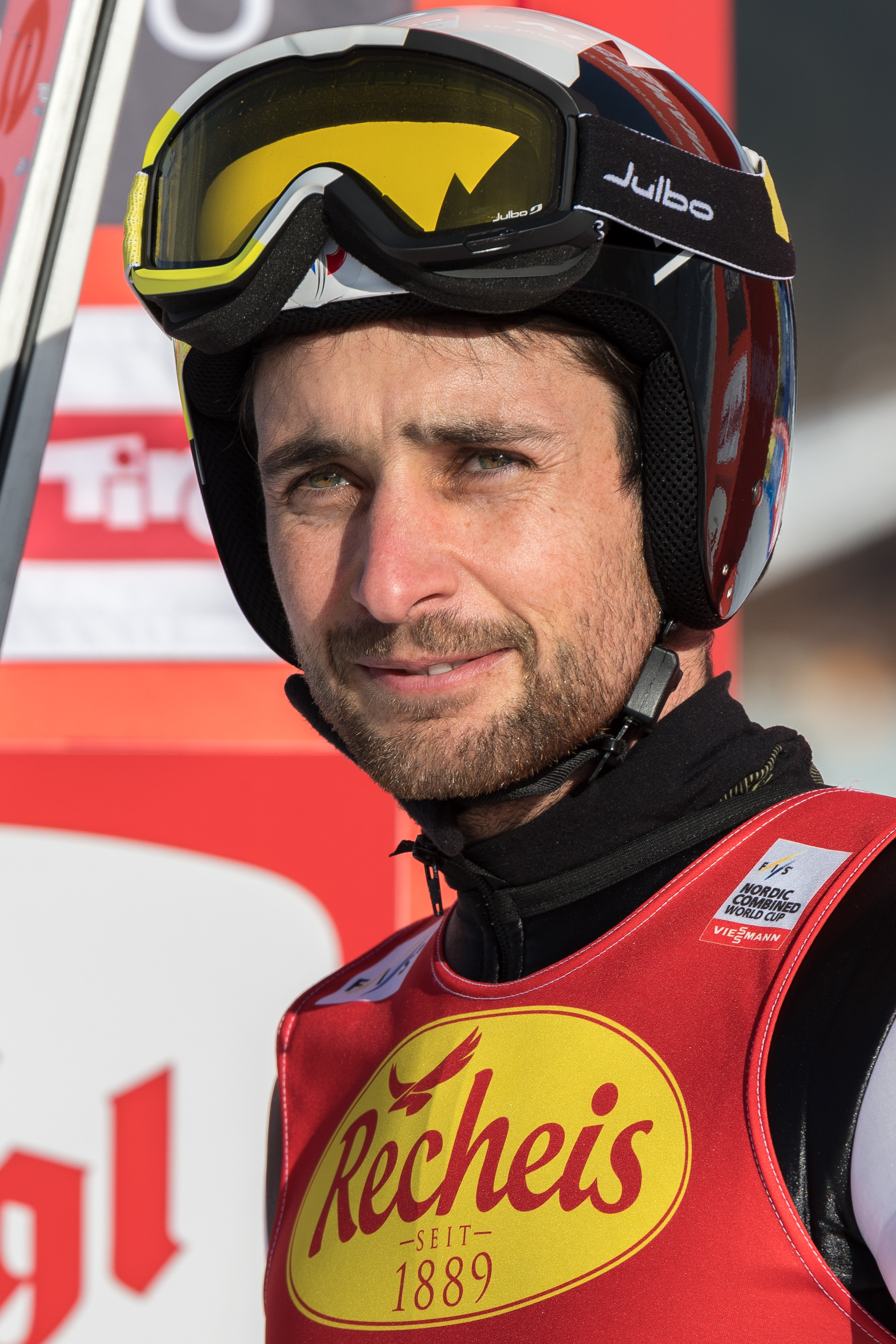

Personal information
- Born: September 9, 1986 (age 39) Missoula, Montana, United States
- Height: 1.79 m (5 ft 10 in)

Sport
- Sport: Skiing
- Club: Douane Bois d'Amont

World Cup career
- Seasons: 2002–2015, 2017–2018
- Indiv. starts: 188
- Indiv. podiums: 59
- Indiv. wins: 26
- Overall titles: 3 (2010, 2011, 2012)
Medal record
Men's Nordic combined
Representing France
Olympic Games
| Gold medal – first place | 2010 Vancouver | 10 km normal hill |
World Championships
| Gold medal – first place | 2011 Oslo | 10 km large hill |
| Gold medal – first place | 2013 Val di Flemme | 10 km normal hill |
| Gold medal – first place | 2013 Val di Flemme | Team normal hill |
| Gold medal – first place | 2013 Val di Flemme | Team sprint |
| Gold medal – first place | 2015 Falun | Team sprint |
| Bronze medal – third place | 2009 Liberec | 10 km mass start |
| Bronze medal – third place | 2009 Liberec | 10 km large hill |
| Bronze medal – third place | 2013 Val di Fiemme | 10 km large hill |
| Bronze medal – third place | 2015 Falun | 10 km individual normal hill |
| Bronze medal – third place | 2015 Falun | 4 x 5 km team |

Jason Lamy-Chappuis (born September 9, 1986) is a Franco-American former ski jumper and cross-country skier who has represented France in Nordic combined ski events between 2002 and 2015, then in the 2017-18 season.

Born in the United States, where he first began competing in skiing events, Chappuis moved with his family to France as a child. Prior to the 2010 Winter Olympics, he had seen success in a number of international competitions, including World Cup events.

He won the gold medal in the 10km individual normal hill at the 2010 Winter Olympics in Vancouver, British Columbia, Canada after passing race leader Johnny Spillane in a dramatic sprint at the finish line. His final time was only .4 seconds faster than Spillane's, the closest finish in a Nordic combined race in Olympic history.

Lamy-Chappuis, five times world champion and three times in a row winner of the overall classification of the Nordic Combined World Cup (2010, 2011, 2012) and also, winner of the sprint discipline in 2007, is a member of the Bois d'Amont ski club in the French department of Jura. He works for the French border patrol in addition to pursuing his athletic career.

He returned in World Cup competitions on 24 November 2017, in Ruka, Finland.

== Personal life ==
Born to a French father and an American mother in Missoula, Montana, Lamy-Chappuis lived in the United States until he was 5, living mainly at Copper Mountain, Colorado. He participated in his first ski racing events at Club Med in Copper Mountain, Colorado as a child. In 1991, at the age of five, he moved to the small village of Bois-d'Amont in eastern France with his parents. There, he attended school and began more intensive training, but continued to race for NASTAR, the American racing program, that year.

Lamy-Chappuis still has many family members in the United States, many of whom traveled to Vancouver to cheer for him in the 2010 Olympics. He also maintains close ties to the American ski team, resulting in U.S. coach Dave Jarrett suggesting jokingly that Lamy-Chappuis switch back to his American citizenship to compete for them. Before flying to Vancouver for the 2010 Olympics, he attended a pre-Olympic training camp in Park City, Utah with the Americans.

An avid flying enthusiast, Lamy-Chappuis started taking flying lessons at the age of 18, so far logging 70 flight hours. His website reflects his passion for flying and is designed to look like a cockpit. He has stated that he plans to focus on receiving his pilot's license following the 2009–2010 season. In addition to skiing, Lamy-Chappuis works as a French border patrol officer. His nickname is "Jèz."

Jason Lamy-Chappuis announced February 28, 2015, after winning his fifth world title in the team sprint with Francois Braud Falun he decided to take his retirement at the end of the 2014-2015 season to concentrate on his training as an airline pilot.

== Athletic career ==
Lamy-Chappuis' first ski jumping competition was in Les Rousses, France in 1991. Even though it was his first competition, he left as the winner. Since he had won cross-country competitions in the U.S. and ski jumping contests in France, he decided to continue pursuing both events through the Nordic combined. After establishing himself as a top regional skier in France, Lamy-Chappuis competed in his first international event in a European Cup Games competition in Planica, Slovenia during the 1999–2000 season. In 2001–2002, he debuted on the French national junior team, leading to appearances in major competitions in Norway, Sweden, Slovenia, Italy, Finland, and Germany during his teenage years. Although he was routinely ranked among the top competitors on the circuit, Lamy-Chappuis has said that "I don't feel like I ever performed to my full potential on the World Cup circuit."

He participated in his World Cup event in 2004 in Oslo, Norway. In 2006, Lamy-Chappuis became the French champion of the Nordic combined and won two World Cup events, at Kuusamo and Sapporo. He made his Olympic debut at the 2006 Winter Olympics in Turin, Italy, placing 11th in the Nordic combined, 4th in the sprint, and 5th in the team event. His fourth-place finish in the sprint left him less than 15 seconds short of the bronze medal finish time, inspiring him to train harder to avoid such disappointment in the future.

In the 2006-07, Lamy-Chappuis won the World Cup overall sprint ranking and finished second in the general ranking. Lamy-Chappuis participated in and won the 7.5 km sprint event at the 2007 Holmenkollen ski festival. He also won the French national championships that year, a feat he repeated in 2007–2008. In 2009, Lamy-Chappuis won two bronze medals at the FIS Nordic World Ski Championships in Liberec, in the 10 km individual large-hill and 10 km mass-start events.

=== Olympic Gold Medal ===
With five wins and nine podiums, Lamy-Chappuis entered the 2010 Winter Olympics in Vancouver, British Columbia, Canada as the World Cup leader in Nordic combined. On Sunday, February 14, Lamy-Chappuis won the Olympic gold medal in the 10km individual normal hill. His winning time was 25:47.1 and came after a frantic finish that involved a last-minute push on his part to beat American Johnny Spillane by .4 seconds. Spillane held the lead until Lamy-Chappuis' final sprint at the finish line eked out the win. It was the closest finish in Olympic Nordic combined history. Earlier in the day, he had finished fifth in the ski jump portion of the competition, one spot behind Spillane. Lamy-Chappuis said after the race that he "honestly didn't think [he] could get the gold medal" after seeing Spillane's lead following the last hill. He attributed his win to Spillane's decision to slow down while entering the stadium, leaving Lamy-Chappuis with the opportunity to glide faster in the final stretch.

The win made Lamy-Chappuis France's second gold medalist of the 2010 Winter Olympics, following Vincent Jay's gold medal earlier in the day in the men's 10 km biathlon sprint. Lamy-Chappuis told the American media that he felt significant pressure from the French media to win the gold medal due to his World Cup success and the belief in the French media that he was "the best chance of a medal for France."

=== After 2010 ===
Lamy-Chappuis qualified for the 2014 Winter Olympics but finished far from the podium.

In May 2017, he said that he goes out of the retirement and starts preparing for the 2018 Winter Olympics. Lamy-Chappuis indeed qualified for the Olympics for both individual and team events, however, he was not considered a medal contender in individual events and hoped to medal, together with the French team, in the team competition.

Olympic Games
| Preceded by Vincent Defrasne | Flagbearer for France; Sochi 2014 | Succeeded by Martin Fourcade |
