= Norihito Kobayashi =

Japanese Nordic combined skier

Medal record

Men's Nordic combined

Representing Japan

World Championships
| Gold medal – first place | 2009 Liberec | 4 x 5 km team |

Norihito Kobayashi (小林 範仁, Kobayashi Norihito; born May 4, 1982) is a Japanese Nordic combined skier who has been competing since 2000. He won a gold medal in the 4 x 5 km team event at the FIS Nordic World Ski Championships 2009 in Liberec and earned his best individual finish of fifth in the 10 km individual normal hill at those same championships.

Kobayashi also competed in three Winter Olympics, earning his best finish of sixth twice (4 x 5 km team: 2006, 2010 while his best individual finish was seventh in the 10 km individual normal hill event at Vancouver in 2010.

His best World Cup finish was fourth twice, both in 7.5 km sprint events (2006, 2008). He has four individual victories, all in lesser events (One in 2001, two in 2003, and one in 2009).
