= 2009–10 FIS Nordic Combined World Cup =

International skiing competition

Nordic Combined World Cup 2009/10
Winners
- Overall: (France) Jason Lamy-Chappuis
- Nations Cup: Austria

Competitions
- Venues: 10
- Individual: 19
- Team: 2
- Cancelled: 2

The 2009/10 FIS Nordic Combined World Cup was the 27th world cup season, a combination of ski jumping and cross-country skiing organized by FIS. It started in Kuusamo, Finland on 28 November 2009 and ended on 14 March 2010 in Oslo, Norway.

== Schedule changes ==
1. On 27 November 2009, it was announced by the FIS that the 5–6 December 2009 events was moved from Trondheim to Lillehammer because of warm weather and lack of snow in Trondheim.
2. On 4 December 2009, it was announced by FIS that the 12–13 December 2009 events in Harrachov were cancelled to warm weather and lack of snow. By 6 December 2009, a possibility that one ski jumping and one Nordic combined World Cup event could take place in Harrachov on 15–16 December 2009. A decision will be made on 9 December 2009 at 1200 CET. By 8 December 2009, it was decided to cancel Harrachov though a third competition may be added to 18 December in Ramsau. Rescheduling in Ramsau for 18 December 2009 was confirmed on 8 December 2009.

== Calendar ==
=== Men ===
Num	Season	Date	Place	Hill	Discipline	Winner	Second	Third	Ref.
336	1	28 November 2009	(Finland) Kuusamo	Rukatunturi	HS142 / 10 km	(France) Jason Lamy Chappuis	(Finland) Hannu Manninen	(Germany) Eric Frenzel	
337	2	29 November 2009	(Finland) Kuusamo	Rukatunturi	HS142 / 10 km	(Finland) Hannu Manninen	(Germany) Tino Edelmann	(Germany) Eric Frenzel	
		5 December 2009	(Norway) Trondheim	Granåsen	HS140 / 10 km	lack of snow; rescheduled to Lillehammer			
		6 December 2009	(Norway) Trondheim	Granåsen	HS 140 / 10 km	lack of snow; rescheduled to Lillehammer			
338	3	5 December 2009	(Norway) Lillehammer	Lysgårdsbakken	HS138 / 10 km	(France) Jason Lamy Chappuis	(Norway) Petter Tande	(Germany) Eric Frenzel	
339	4	6 December 2009	(Norway) Lillehammer	Lysgårdsbakken	HS138 / 10 km	(Germany) Tino Edelmann	(Finland) Anssi Koivuranta	(France) Jason Lamy Chappuis	
		13 December 2009	(Czech Republic) Harrachov	Čerťák	HS142 / 10 km	temperatures and lack of snow			
340	5	18 December 2009	(Austria) Ramsau	W90-Mattensprunganlage	HS98 / 10 km	(France) Jason Lamy Chappuis	(Austria) Felix Gottwald	(Norway) Magnus Moan	
341	6	19 December 2009	(Austria) Ramsau	W90-Mattensprunganlage	HS98 / 10 km	(France) Jason Lamy Chappuis	(Germany) Tino Edelmann	(Italy) Alessandro Pittin	
342	7	20 December 2009	(Austria) Ramsau	W90-Mattensprunganlage	HS98 / 10 km	(Germany) Björn Kircheisen	(Norway) Magnus Moan	(Austria) Felix Gottwald	
343	8	2 January 2010	(Germany) Oberhof	Hans-Renner-Schanze	HS140 / 10 km	(Finland) Hannu Manninen	(Austria) Felix Gottwald	(France) Jason Lamy Chappuis	
344	9	3 January 2010	(Germany) Oberhof	Hans-Renner-Schanze	HS140 / 10 km	(United States) Johnny Spillane	(Austria) Felix Gottwald	(Germany) Björn Kircheisen	
345	10	9 January 2010	(Italy) Val di Fiemme	Trampolino dal Ben	HS134 / 10 km	(Austria) Felix Gottwald	(Norway) Magnus Moan	(Germany) Eric Frenzel	
346	11	10 January 2010	(Italy) Val di Fiemme	Trampolino dal Ben	HS134 / 10 km	(United States) Bill Demong	(United States) Todd Lodwick	(Germany) Eric Frenzel	
347	12	16 January 2010	(France) Chaux-Neuve	La Côté Feuillée	HS100 / 10 km	(Norway) Magnus Moan	(France) Jason Lamy Chappuis	(United States) Todd Lodwick	
348	13	17 January 2010	(France) Chaux-Neuve	La Côté Feuillée	HS100 / 10 km	(Norway) Magnus Moan	(France) Jason Lamy Chappuis	(Austria) Mario Stecher	
349	14	23 January 2010	(Germany) Schonach	Langenwaldschanze	HS96 / 10 km	(France) Jason Lamy Chappuis	(Czech Republic) Pavel Churavy	(Italy) Alessandro Pittin	
350	15	30 January 2010	(Austria) Seefeld	Toni-Seelos-Olympiaschanze	HS100 / 10 km	(Germany) Eric Frenzel	(Austria) Mario Stecher	(Japan) Akito Watabe	
351	16	31 January 2010	(Austria) Seefeld	Toni-Seelos-Olympiaschanze	HS100 / 10 km	(Austria) Mario Stecher	(Germany) Eric Frenzel	(Italy) Alessandro Pittin	
2010 Winter Olympics
352	17	5 March 2010	(Finland) Lahti	Salpausselkä	HS130 / 10 km	(Norway) Magnus Moan	(Finland) Hannu Manninen	(Germany) Tino Edelmann	
353	18	6 March 2010	(Finland) Lahti	Salpausselkä	HS130 / 10 km	(Finland) Hannu Manninen	(Austria) Felix Gottwald	(France) Jason Lamy Chappuis	
354	19	14 March 2010	(Norway) Oslo	Holmenkollbakken	HS134 / 10 km	(France) Jason Lamy Chappuis	(Austria) Felix Gottwald	(Norway) Magnus Moan	

=== Team ===
Num	Season	Date	Place	Hill	Discipline	Winner	Second	Third	Ref.
		12 December 2009	(Czech Republic) Harrachov	Čerťák	HS142 / 4 x 5 km	temperatures and lack of snow			
10	1	24 January 2010	(Germany) Schonach	Langenwaldschanze	HS96 / 4 x 5 km	Germany Georg Hettich; Eric Frenzel; Björn Kircheisen; Tino Edelmann	France Sebastien Lacroix; Maxime Laheurte; Jonathan Felisaz; Jason Lamy-Chappuis	Austria Lukas Klapfer; Wilhelm Denifl; Marco Pichlmayer; Tobias Kammerlander	
11	2	13 March 2010	(Norway) Oslo	Holmenkollbakken	HS134 / 4 x 5 km	Norway Petter Tande; Mikko Kokslien; Jan Schmid; Magnus Moan	Austria Bernhard Gruber; David Kreiner; Felix Gottwald; Mario Stecher	Germany Johannes Rydzek; Georg Hettich; Eric Frenzel; Tino Edelmann	

== Standings ==
=== Overall ===
Rank		Points
1	(France) Jason Lamy-Chappuis	1155
2	(Austria) Felix Gottwald	879
3	(Norway) Magnus Moan	747
4	(Germany) Eric Frenzel	697
5	(Germany) Tino Edelmann	641
6	(Austria) Mario Stecher	635
7	(Czech Republic) Pavel Churavý	512
8	(Finland) Hannu Manninen	474
9	(United States) Johnny Spillane	465
10	(Germany) Björn Kircheisen	463

Rank		Points
11	(Finland) Anssi Koivuranta	433
12	(United States) Bill Demong	423
13	(Italy) Alessandro Pittin	391
14	(Norway) Petter Tande	360
15	(United States) Todd Lodwick	347
16	(Austria) Bernhard Gruber	311
17	(Norway) Jan Schmid	288
18	(Japan) Akito Watabe	285
18	(Austria) David Kreiner	285
20	(Finland) Janne Ryynänen	263

Rank		Points
21	(Austria) Christoph Bieler	258
22	(Japan) Norihito Kobayashi	241
23	(Austria) Wilhelm Denifl	204
24	(Switzerland) Ronny Heer	198
25	(Germany) Johannes Rydzek	197
26	(Norway) Mikko Kokslien	172
27	(Switzerland) Seppi Hurschler	161
28	(France) Sébastien Lacroix	154
29	(Austria) Tomaz Druml	152
30	(France) François Braud	150

- Standings after 19 events.

=== Nations Cup ===
Rank		Points
1	Austria	3562
2	Germany	3068
3	Norway	2164
4	France	2115
5	United States	1450
6	Finland	1286
7	Czech Republic	1065
8	Japan	906
9	Italy	735
10	Switzerland	694

- Standings after 21 events.
