= 2014–15 FIS Nordic Combined World Cup =

International skiing competition

Nordic Combined World Cup 2014/15
Winners
- Overall: (Germany) Eric Frenzel
- Nations Cup: Germany
- Triple trophy: (Germany) Eric Frenzel

Competitions
- Venues: 11
- Individual: 17
- Team: 5
- Cancelled: 3

The 2014/15 FIS Nordic Combined World Cup was the 32nd world cup season, a combination of ski jumping and cross-country skiing organized by FIS. It started on 29 November 2014 in Ruka, Finland and ended on 14 March 2015 in Oslo, Norway.

== Calendar ==
=== Men ===
Num	Season	Date	Place	Hill	Discipline	Winner	Second	Third	Yellow bib	Ref.
425	1	29 November 2014	(Finland) Ruka	Rukatunturi	HS142 / 10 km	(Germany) Johannes Rydzek	(Austria) Bernhard Gruber	(Czech Republic) Miroslav Dvořák	(Germany) Johannes Rydzek	
426	2	6 December 2014	(Norway) Lillehammer	Lysgårdsbakken	HS138 / 10 km	(Germany) Eric Frenzel	(Germany) Fabian Rießle	(Norway) Jan Schmid	(Germany) Johannes Rydzek (Germany) Fabian Rießle	
427	3	7 December 2014	(Norway) Lillehammer	Lysgårdsbakken	HS138 / 10 km	(Norway) Mikko Kokslien	(Germany) Fabian Rießle	(France) Jason Lamy-Chappuis	(Germany) Fabian Rießle	
428	4	21 December 2014	(Austria) Ramsau	W90-Mattensprunganlage	HS98 / 10 km	(France) Jason Lamy-Chappuis	(Norway) Mikko Kokslien	(Germany) Fabian Rießle	(Germany) Fabian Rießle	
429	5	4 January 2015	(Germany) Schonach	Langenwaldschanze	HS106 / 10 km	(Austria) Lukas Klapfer	(Japan) Akito Watabe	(Norway) Jan Schmid	(Germany) Fabian Rießle	
430	6	10 January 2015	(France) Chaux-Neuve	La Côté Feuillée	HS118 / 10 km	(Germany) Eric Frenzel	(Germany) Fabian Rießle	(Norway) Magnus Moan	(Germany) Fabian Rießle	
431	7	11 January 2015	(France) Chaux-Neuve	La Côté Feuillée	HS118 / 10 km	(Norway) Magnus Moan	(Norway) Magnus Krog	(Austria) Bernhard Gruber	(Germany) Fabian Rießle	
2nd Nordic Combined Triple Overall (16–18 January 2015)
432	8	16 January 2015	(Austria) Seefeld	Toni-Seelos-Olympiaschanze	HS109 / 5 km	(Germany) Eric Frenzel	(Norway) Jan Schmid	(Norway) Jarl Magnus Riiber	(Germany) Fabian Rießle	
433	9	17 January 2015	(Austria) Seefeld	Toni-Seelos-Olympiaschanze	HS109 / 10 km	(Germany) Eric Frenzel	(Austria) Bernhard Gruber	(Germany) Tino Edelmann	(Germany) Eric Frenzel	
434	10	18 January 2015	(Austria) Seefeld	Toni-Seelos-Olympiaschanze	HS109 / 15 km	(Germany) Eric Frenzel	(Norway) Håvard Klemetsen	(Japan) Akito Watabe	(Germany) Eric Frenzel	
435	11	23 January 2015	(Japan) Sapporo	Ōkurayama	HS134 / 10 km	(Germany) Eric Frenzel	(Norway) Jan Schmid	(Norway) Håvard Klemetsen	(Germany) Eric Frenzel	
436	12	24 January 2015	(Japan) Sapporo	Ōkurayama	HS134 / 10 km	(Germany) Eric Frenzel	(Japan) Akito Watabe	(United States) Taylor Fletcher	(Germany) Eric Frenzel	
437	13	30 January 2015	(Italy) Val di Fiemme	Trampolino dal Ben	HS134 / 10 km	(Austria) Bernhard Gruber	(Norway) Jan Schmid	(Norway) Jørgen Graabak	(Germany) Eric Frenzel	
438	14	1 February 2015	(Italy) Val di Fiemme	Trampolino dal Ben	HS134 / 10 km	(Norway) Jørgen Graabak	(Austria) Bernhard Gruber	(Germany) Fabian Rießle	(Germany) Eric Frenzel	
		7 February 2015	(Czech Republic) Liberec	Ještěd „A“	HS134 / 10 km	schedule overlapping with Biathlon;, rescheduled to Val di Fiemme				
		8 February 2015	(Czech Republic) Liberec	Ještěd „A“	HS134 / 10 km	schedule overlapping with Biathlon;, rescheduled to Val di Fiemme				
FIS Nordic World Ski Championships 2015
439	15	6 March 2015	(Finland) Lahti	Salpausselkä	HS130 / 10 km	(Japan) Akito Watabe	(Germany) Johannes Rydzek	(Germany) Fabian Rießle	(Germany) Eric Frenzel	
440	16	12 March 2015	(Norway) Trondheim	Granåsen	HS140 / 10 km	(Norway) Magnus Moan	(Germany) Fabian Rießle	(Italy) Alessandro Pittin	(Germany) Eric Frenzel	
441	17	14 March 2015	(Norway) Oslo	Holmenkollbakken	HS134 / 15 km	(Japan) Akito Watabe	(Germany) Johannes Rydzek	(Italy) Alessandro Pittin	(Germany) Eric Frenzel	

=== Team ===
Num	Season	Date	Place	Hill	Discipline	Winner	Second	Third	Yellow bib	Ref.
26	1	30 November 2014	(Finland) Ruka	Rukatunturi	HS142 / 2 x 7.5 km Sprint	Norway I Håvard Klemetsen; Jørgen Graabak	Germany II Björn Kircheisen; Eric Frenzel	France I Jason Lamy-Chappuis; François Braud	Germany	
27	2	20 December 2014	(Austria) Ramsau	W90-Mattensprunganlage	HS98 / 4 x 5 km	Norway Mikko Kokslien; Håvard Klemetsen; Jan Schmid; Jørgen Graabak	Germany Tino Edelmann; Eric Frenzel; Johannes Rydzek; Fabian Rießle	France Sébastien Lacroix; Jason Lamy-Chappuis; François Braud; Maxime Laheurte	Germany	
28	3	3 January 2015	(Germany) Schonach	Langenwaldschanze	HS106 / 4 x 5 km	Germany Eric Frenzel; Tino Edelmann; Björn Kircheisen; Johannes Rydzek	Norway Jan Schmid; Håvard Klemetsen; Mikko Kokslien; Jørgen Graabak	France Maxime Laheurte; Sébastien Lacroix; François Braud; Jason Lamy-Chappuis	Germany	
		11 January 2015	(France) Chaux-Neuve	La Côté Feuillée	HS118 / 2 x 7.5 km Sprint	heavy snow; replaced with an individual Gundersen.				
29	4	31 January 2015	(Italy) Val di Fiemme	Trampolino dal Ben	HS134 / 2 x 7.5 km Sprint	Norway I Jan Schmid; Jørgen Graabak	Germany Manuel Faißt; Fabian Rießle	Austria I Sepp Schneider; Bernhard Gruber	Germany	
30	5	7 March 2015	(Finland) Lahti	Salpausselkä	HS130 / 2 x 7.5 km Sprint	Germany I Fabian Rießle; Johannes Rydzek	France I Sébastien Lacroix; Jason Lamy-Chappuis	Norway I Magnus Krog; Håvard Klemetsen	Germany	

== Standings ==
=== Overall ===
Rank		Points
1	(Germany) Eric Frenzel	945
2	(Japan) Akito Watabe	777
3	(Germany) Johannes Rydzek	731
4	(Germany) Fabian Rießle	724
5	(Austria) Bernhard Gruber	684
6	(Norway) Håvard Klemetsen	593
7	(Norway) Jan Schmid	578
8	(Norway) Magnus Moan	553
9	(Norway) Mikko Kokslien	534
10	(Austria) Lukas Klapfer	401

- Standings after 17 events.

=== Nations Cup ===
Rank		Points
1	Germany	4458
2	Norway	4245
3	Austria	2851
4	France	2008
5	Japan	1798
6	Italy	1005
7	United States	805
8	Czech Republic	573
9	Finland	346
10	Slovenia	234

- Standings after 22 events.

=== Prize money ===
Rank		CHF
1	(Germany) Eric Frenzel	76,350
2	(Germany) Fabian Rießle	57,950
3	(Germany) Johannes Rydzek	53,070
4	(Japan) Akito Watabe	47,175
5	(Norway) Jan Schmid	45,975
6	(Norway) Håvard Klemetsen	45,100
7	(Austria) Bernhard Gruber	41,250
8	(Norway) Jørgen Graabak	36,025
9	(Norway) Mikko Kokslien	34,200
10	(Norway) Magnus Moan	31,885

- Standings after 22 events.

== Points ==
The table shows the number of points won in the 2014–15 Nordic Combined World Cup.

Place	1	2	3	4	5	6	7	8	9	10	11	12	13	14	15	16	17	18	19	20	21	22	23	24	25	26	27	28	29	30
Individual	100	80	60	50	45	40	36	32	29	26	24	22	20	18	16	15	14	13	12	11	10	9	8	7	6	5	4	3	2	1
Nordic Combined Triple – Days 1 & 2	50	40	30	25	23	20	18	16	15	13	12	11	10	9	8	8	7	7	6	6	5	5	4	4	3	3	2	2	1	1
Nordic Combined Triple – Day 3	200	160	120	100	90	80	72	64	58	52	48	44	40	36	32	30	29	26	24	22	20	18	16	14	12	10	8	6	4	2
Team competition	400	350	300	250	200	150	100	50
Team sprint	200	175	150	125	100	75	50	25

== Achievements ==
First World Cup career victory

- Lukas Klapfer (AUT), 29, in his 10th season – the WC 5 in Schonach; first podium was 2008–09 in Seefeld
- Jørgen Graabak (NOR), 23, in his 5th season – the WC 14 in Val di Fiemme; first podium was 2011–12 in Seefeld

First World Cup podium

- Jarl Magnus Riiber (NOR), 17, in his 1st season – no. 3 in the WC 8 in Seefeld

Victories in this World Cup (in brackets victory for all time)

- Eric Frenzel (GER), 7 (23) first places
- Magnus Moan (NOR), 2 (24) first places
- Akito Watabe (JPN), 2 (7) first places
- Johannes Rydzek (GER), 1 (5) first place
- Mikko Kokslien (NOR), 1 (7) first place
- Jason Lamy-Chappuis (FRA), 1 (26) first place
- Lukas Klapfer (AUT), 1 (1) first place
- Bernhard Gruber (AUT), 1 (5) first place
- Jørgen Graabak (NOR), 1 (1) first place

== Retirements ==
Following are notable Nordic combined skiers who announced their retirement:

- Jason Lamy-Chappuis (FRA)
- Sébastien Lacroix (FRA)
- Bill Demong (USA)
- Mario Stecher (AUT)
- Tomas Slavik (CZE)
