= 2016–17 FIS Nordic Combined World Cup =

Skiing competition

Nordic Combined World Cup 2016/17
Winners
- Overall: (Germany) Eric Frenzel
- Nations Cup: Germany
- Triple trophy: (Germany) Eric Frenzel

Competitions
- Venues: 12
- Individual: 23
- Team: 2

The 2016/17 FIS Nordic Combined World Cup was the 34th World Cup season, organized by the International Ski Federation. It started on 26 November 2016 in Ruka, Finland and ended on 19 March 2017 in Schonach, Germany.

== Calendar ==
=== Men ===
Num	Season	Date	Place	Hill	Discipline	Winner	Second	Third	Yellow bib	Ref.
461	1	26 November 2016	(Finland) Ruka	Rukatunturi	HS142 / 10 km	(Germany) Johannes Rydzek	(Germany) Eric Frenzel	(Norway) Jørgen Graabak	(Germany) Johannes Rydzek	
462	2	27 November 2016	(Finland) Ruka	Rukatunturi	HS142 / 10 km	(Germany) Johannes Rydzek	(Austria) Wilhelm Denifl	(Japan) Akito Watabe	(Germany) Johannes Rydzek	
463	3	3 December 2016	(Norway) Lillehammer	Lysgårdsbakken	HS100 / 10 km	(Germany) Eric Frenzel	(Germany) Johannes Rydzek	(Germany) Fabian Rießle	(Germany) Johannes Rydzek	
464	4	4 December 2016	(Norway) Lillehammer	Lysgårdsbakken	HS138 / 10 km	(Germany) Eric Frenzel	(Germany) Björn Kircheisen	(Norway) Jørgen Graabak	(Germany) Johannes Rydzek	
465	5	17 December 2016	(Austria) Ramsau	W90-Mattensprunganlage	HS98 / 10 km	(Germany) Johannes Rydzek	(Germany) Fabian Rießle	(Germany) Eric Frenzel	(Germany) Johannes Rydzek	
466	6	18 December 2016	(Austria) Ramsau	W90-Mattensprunganlage	HS98 / 10 km	(Germany) Eric Frenzel	(Germany) Fabian Rießle	(Germany) Vinzenz Geiger	(Germany) Johannes Rydzek	
467	7	7 January 2017	(Finland) Lahti	Salpausselkä	HS130 / 10 km	(Germany) Eric Frenzel	(Finland) Eero Hirvonen	(Germany) Johannes Rydzek	(Germany) Eric Frenzel	
468	8	8 January 2017	(Finland) Lahti	Salpausselkä	HS130 / 10 km	(Germany) Fabian Rießle	(Germany) Eric Frenzel	(Germany) Johannes Rydzek	(Germany) Eric Frenzel	
469	9	13 January 2017	(Italy) Val di Fiemme	Trampolino dal Ben	HS134 / 10 km	(Germany) Eric Frenzel	(Germany) Johannes Rydzek	(Norway) Magnus Moan	(Germany) Eric Frenzel	
470	10	15 January 2017	(Italy) Val di Fiemme	Trampolino dal Ben	HS134 / 10 km	(Germany) Eric Frenzel	(Germany) Johannes Rydzek	(Japan) Akito Watabe	(Germany) Eric Frenzel	
471	11	21 January 2017	(France) Chaux-Neuve	La Côté Feuillée	HS118 / 10 km	(Germany) Johannes Rydzek	(Germany) Fabian Rießle	(Japan) Akito Watabe	(Germany) Eric Frenzel	
472	12	22 January 2017	(France) Chaux-Neuve	La Côté Feuillée	HS118 / 10 km	(Germany) Fabian Rießle	(Germany) Johannes Rydzek	(Germany) Eric Frenzel	(Germany) Eric Frenzel	
4th Nordic Combined Triple (27–29 January 2016)
473	13	27 January 2017	(Austria) Seefeld	Toni-Seelos-Olympiaschanze	HS109 / 5 km	(Germany) Johannes Rydzek	(Germany) Eric Frenzel	(Italy) Samuel Costa	(Germany) Eric Frenzel	
474	14	28 January 2017	(Austria) Seefeld	Toni-Seelos-Olympiaschanze	HS109 / 10 km	(Germany) Johannes Rydzek	(Germany) Eric Frenzel	(Italy) Samuel Costa	(Germany) Johannes Rydzek	
475	15	29 January 2017	(Austria) Seefeld	Toni-Seelos-Olympiaschanze	HS109 / 15 km	(Germany) Eric Frenzel	(Germany) Johannes Rydzek	(Austria) Bernhard Gruber	(Germany) Eric Frenzel	
476	16	4 February 2017	(South Korea) PyeongChang	Alpensia	HS140 / 10 km	(Germany) Johannes Rydzek	(Austria) Mario Seidl	(Germany) Fabian Rießle	(Germany) Johannes Rydzek	
477	17	5 February 2017	(South Korea) PyeongChang	Alpensia	HS140 / 10 km	(Germany) Johannes Rydzek	(Germany) Eric Frenzel	(Austria) Mario Seidl	(Germany) Johannes Rydzek	
478	18	10 February 2017	(Japan) Sapporo	Okurayama	HS134 / 10 km	(Germany) Björn Kircheisen	(Japan) Akito Watabe	(Norway) Mikko Kokslien	(Germany) Johannes Rydzek	
479	19	11 February 2017	(Japan) Sapporo	Okurayama	HS134 / 10 km	(Japan) Akito Watabe	(Switzerland) Tim Hug	(Germany) Manuel Faißt	(Germany) Johannes Rydzek	
FIS Nordic World Ski Championships 2017
480	20	11 March 2017	(Norway) Oslo	Holmenkollbakken	HS134 / 10 km	(Japan) Akito Watabe	(Germany) Eric Frenzel	(Germany) Björn Kircheisen	(Germany) Johannes Rydzek	
481	21	15 March 2017	(Norway) Trondheim	Granåsen	HS140 / 10 km	(Germany) Eric Frenzel	(Germany) Johannes Rydzek	(Germany) Fabian Rießle	(Germany) Eric Frenzel	
482	22	18 March 2017	(Germany) Schonach	Langenwaldschanze	HS106 / 10 km	(Germany) Eric Frenzel	(Austria) Wilhelm Denifl	(Germany) Johannes Rydzek	(Germany) Eric Frenzel	
483	23	19 March 2017	(Germany) Schonach	Langenwaldschanze	HS106 / 10 km	(Germany) Eric Frenzel	(France) François Braud	(Japan) Akito Watabe	(Germany) Eric Frenzel	

=== Men's team ===
Num	Season	Date	Place	Hill	Discipline	Winner	Second	Third	Yellow bib	Ref.
34	1	2 December 2016	(Norway) Lillehammer	Lysgårdsbakken	HS100 / 4x5 km Relay	Germany Björn Kircheisen; Eric Frenzel; Fabian Rießle; Johannes Rydzek	Norway Mikko Kokslien; Espen Andersen; Haavard Klemetsen; Jørgen Gråbak	Austria David Pommer; Mario Seidl; Wilhelm Denifl; Philipp Orter	Germany	
35	2	14 January 2017	(Italy) Val di Fiemme	Trampolino dal Ben	HS134 / 2x7.5 km Sprint	Norway I Espen Andersen; Jørgen Gråbak	Czech Republic I Tomáš Portyk; Miroslav Dvořák	Italy I Samuel Costa; Alessandro Pittin	Germany	
36	3	4 February 2017	(South Korea) PyeongChang	Alpensia	HS140 / 4x5 km Relay	replaced with an individual Gundersen				

== Standings ==
=== Overall ===
Pos		Points
1	(Germany) Eric Frenzel	1734
2	(Germany) Johannes Rydzek	1609
3	(Japan) Akito Watabe	1086
4	(Germany) Fabian Rießle	1069
5	(Germany) Björn Kircheisen	748
6	(Austria) Mario Seidl	719
7	(Finland) Ilkka Herola	475
8	(Finland) Eero Hirvonen	464
9	(Austria) Wilhelm Denifl	442
10	(Austria) Bernhard Gruber	436

- Final standings after 23 events.

=== Nations Cup ===
Pos		Points
1	Germany	6688
2	Austria	3372
3	Norway	2823
4	Japan	2106
5	Finland	1450
6	France	860
7	Italy	675
8	Czech Republic	464
9	Switzerland	357
10	United States	215

- Final standings after 25 events.

=== Prize money ===
Pos		CHF
1	(Germany) Eric Frenzel	135430
2	(Germany) Johannes Rydzek	121420
3	(Germany) Fabian Rießle	68860
4	(Japan) Akito Watabe	61300
5	(Germany) Björn Kircheisen	39920
6	(Austria) Mario Seidl	34505
7	(Norway) Jørgen Graabak	26940
8	(Austria) Wilhelm Denifl	22300
9	(Norway) Espen Andersen	21370
10	(Finland) Eero Hirvonen	21220

- Final standings after 25 events.

== Achievements ==
First World Cup podium

- Vinzenz Geiger (GER), 19, in his 2nd season – no. 3 in the WC 6 in Ramsau
- Eero Hirvonen (FIN), 20, in his 2nd season – no. 2 in the WC 7 in Lahti
- Samuel Costa (ITA), 24, in his 6th season – no. 3 in the WC 13 in Seefeld
- Mario Seidl (AUT), 24, in his 5th season – no. 2 in the WC 16 in PyeongChang

Victories in this World Cup (in brackets victory for all time)

- Eric Frenzel (GER), 10 (41) first places
- Johannes Rydzek (GER), 8 (14) first places
- Akito Watabe (JPN), 2 (9) first places
- Fabian Rießle (GER), 2 (5) first places
- Björn Kircheisen (GER), 1 (17) first place

== Retirements ==
Following are notable Nordic combined skiers who announced their retirement:

- Håvard Klemetsen (NOR)
