= 2008–09 FIS Nordic Combined World Cup =

International skiing competition

Nordic Combined World Cup 2008/09
Winners
- Overall: (Finland) Anssi Koivuranta
- Grand Prix Germany: (Finland) Anssi Koivuranta
- Nations Cup: Germany

Competitions
- Venues: 12
- Individual: 23
- Team: 1
- Cancelled: 2

The 2008/09 FIS Nordic Combined World Cup was the 26th world cup season, a combination of ski jumping and cross-country skiing organized by FIS. It began in Kuusamo on 29 November 2008. Anssi Koivuranta from Finland became overall winner. Hannu Manninen retired before the season began.

== Changes ==
This World Cup is the first season with a new system. Instead of a sprint (1x jump and 7,5 km cross country skiing race) and Gundersen (2x jumps and 1x 15 km cross country skiing race), there is now a combined competition with a single jump and a single 10 km cross country skiing race. The Masstart is unchanged. The Relay is now 5 km Cross country and one jump for every jumper in the team.

== Calendar ==
=== Men ===
Num	Season	Date	Place	Hill	Discipline	Winner	Second	Third
313	1	29 November 2008	(Finland) Kuusamo	Rukatunturi	HS142 / 10 km	(Germany) Ronny Ackermann	(Finland) Janne Ryynänen	(Finland) Anssi Koivuranta
314	2	30 November 2008	(Finland) Kuusamo	Rukatunturi	HS142 / 10 km	(Finland) Anssi Koivuranta	(Finland) Janne Ryynänen	(Japan) Daito Takahashi
315	3	6 December 2008	(Norway) Trondheim	Granåsen	HS131 / 10 km	(Norway) Magnus Moan	(France) Jason Lamy-Chappuis	(Finland) Anssi Koivuranta
316	4	7 December 2008	(Norway) Trondheim	Granåsen	HS131 / 10 km	(Finland) Anssi Koivuranta	(Germany) Björn Kircheisen	(France) Jason Lamy Chappuis
		13 December 2008	(Czech Republic) Liberec	Ještěd A	HS134 / 10 km	temperatures and lack of snow		
		14 December 2008	(Czech Republic) Liberec	Ještěd A	HS134 / 10 km	temperatures and lack of snow		
317	5	20 December 2008	(Austria) Ramsau	W90-Mattensprunganlage	HS98 / 10 km	(United States) Bill Demong	(Germany) Björn Kircheisen	(Norway) Jan Schmid
318	6	21 December 2008	(Austria) Ramsau	W90-Mattensprunganlage	HS98 / 10 km	(Germany) Björn Kircheisen	(United States) Bill Demong	(France) Jason Lamy Chappuis
3rd Grand Prix Germany (27 December 2008 - 4 January 2009)
319	7	27 December 2008	(Germany) Oberhof	Hans-Renner-Schanze	HS140 / 10 km	(Norway) Magnus Moan	(United States) Todd Lodwick	(Finland) Anssi Koivuranta
320	8	28 December 2008	(Germany) Oberhof	Hans-Renner-Schanze	HS140 / 10 km	(Finland) Anssi Koivuranta	(United States) Todd Lodwick	(France) Jason Lamy Chappuis
321	9	4 January 2009	(Germany) Schonach	Langenwaldschanze	HS96 / 10 km	(Finland) Anssi Koivuranta	(United States) Bill Demong	(Germany) Björn Kircheisen
322	10	10 January 2009	(Italy) Val di Fiemme	Trampolino dal Ben	10 km / HS134	(Germany) Björn Kircheisen	(Austria) Bernhard Gruber	(Norway) Jan Schmid
323	11	11 January 2009	(Italy) Val di Fiemme	Trampolino dal Ben	HS134 / 10 km	(Norway) Magnus Moan	(Norway) Jan Schmid	(Czech Republic) Pavel Churavý
324	12	16 January 2009	(Canada) Vancouver	Whistler Olympic Park	HS140 / 10 km	(United States) Bill Demong	(Finland) Anssi Koivuranta	(Germany) Björn Kircheisen
325	13	17 January 2009	(Canada) Vancouver	Whistler Olympic Park	HS140 / 10 km	(Norway) Magnus Moan	(Germany) Björn Kircheisen	(United States) Bill Demong
326	14	31 January 2009	(France) Chaux-Neuve	La Côté Feuillée	HS100 / 10 km	(Norway) Magnus Moan	(Finland) Anssi Koivuranta	(Germany) Björn Kircheisen
327	15	1 February 2009	(France) Chaux-Neuve	La Côté Feuillée	HS100 / 10 km	(Finland) Anssi Koivuranta	(Austria) Christoph Bieler	(Norway) Magnus Moan
328	16	7 February 2009	(Austria) Seefeld	Toni-Seelos-Olympiaschanze	HS100 / 10 km	(Austria) Mario Stecher	(Norway) Jan Schmid	(Austria) Lukas Klapfer
329	17	8 February 2009	(Austria) Seefeld	Toni-Seelos-Olympiaschanze	HS100 / 10 km	(Norway) Magnus Moan	(Austria) Mario Stecher	(Finland) Anssi Koivuranta
330	18	14 February 2009	(Germany) Klingenthal	Vogtland Arena	HS140 / 10 km	(Finland) Anssi Koivuranta	(Norway) Magnus Moan	(Norway) Jan Schmid
331	19	15 February 2009	(Germany) Klingenthal	Vogtland Arena	HS140 / 10 km	(United States) Bill Demong	(France) Jason Lamy Chappuis	(Czech Republic) Pavel Churavy
FIS Nordic World Ski Championships 2009
332	20	6 March 2009	(Finland) Lahti	Salpausselkä	HS130 / 10 km	(United States) Bill Demong	(Finland) Anssi Koivuranta	(France) Jason Lamy Chappuis
333	21	7 March 2009	(Finland) Lahti	Salpausselkä	HS130 / 10 km	(Norway) Magnus Moan	(Finland) Anssi Koivuranta	(United States) Bill Demong
334	22	14 March 2009	(Norway) Vikersund	Vikersundbakken	HS117 / 10 km	(Finland) Anssi Koivuranta	(United States) Bill Demong	(Norway) Magnus Moan
335	23	15 March 2009	(Norway) Vikersund	Vikersundbakken	HS117 / 10 km	(United States) Bill Demong	(Norway) Petter Tande	(Norway) Mikko Kokslien

=== Team ===
Num	Season	Date	Place	Hill	Discipline	Winner	Second	Third
9	1	3 January 2009	(Germany) Schonach	Langenwaldschanze	HS96 / 4 x 5 km	Germany Georg Hettich; Eric Frenzel; Björn Kircheisen; Tino Edelmann	Norway Jan Schmid; Petter Tande; Håvard Klemetsen; Magnus Moan	Austria Lukas Klapfer; Bernhard Gruber; Wilhelm Denifl; Mario Stecher
		8 February 2009	(Austria) Seefeld	Toni-Seelos-Olympiaschanze	HS100 / 4 x 5 km	replaced with individual event		

== Standings ==
=== Overall ===
Rank		Points
1	(Finland) Anssi Koivuranta	1461
2	(Norway) Magnus Moan	1350
3	(United States) Bill Demong	1160
4	(Germany) Björn Kircheisen	957
5	(France) Jason Lamy Chappuis	806
6	(Austria) Mario Stecher	630
7	(Norway) Jan Schmid	622
8	(Germany) Tino Edelmann	593
9	(Austria) Bernhard Gruber	524
10	(Czech Republic) Pavel Churavy	498

- Standings after 23 events.

=== Nations Cup ===
Rank		Points
1	Germany	3402
2	Norway	3344
3	Austria	2989
4	Finland	2374
5	United States	1807
6	France	1763
7	Japan	992
8	Czech Republic	868
9	Switzerland	435
10	Italy	163

- Standings after 24 event.
