= 2015–16 FIS Nordic Combined World Cup =

International skiing competition

Nordic Combined World Cup 2015/16
Winners
- Overall: (Germany) Eric Frenzel
- Nations Cup: Germany
- Triple trophy: (Germany) Eric Frenzel

Competitions
- Venues: 10
- Individual: 19
- Team: 3
- Cancelled: 7

The 2015/16 FIS Nordic Combined World Cup was the 33rd World Cup season, organized by the International Ski Federation. It started on 4 December 2015 in Lillehammer, Norway and ended on 6 March 2016 in Schonach, Germany.

== Calendar ==
=== Men ===
Num	Season	Date	Place	Hill	Discipline	Winner	Second	Third	Yellow bib	Ref.
		28 November 2015	(Finland) Ruka	Rukatunturi	HS142 / 10 km	strong wind; rescheduled to Trondheim				
		29 November 2015	(Finland) Ruka	Rukatunturi	HS142 / 10 km	strong wind; rescheduled to Lahti				
442	1	4–5 December 2015 (Note: Originally this event was scheduled as team event, but the ski jumping round was cancelled because of strong wind. That's why it was transformed into an individual Gudersen with PCR round held on 4 December counted as a ski jumping part of competition. Cross-country round was held on regular schedule on 5 December and together counted as individual HS 138 / 10 km event.)	(Norway) Lillehammer	Lysgårdsbakken	HS138 / 10 km	(Germany) Fabian Rießle	(Japan) Akito Watabe	(Finland) Ilkka Herola	(Germany) Fabian Rießle	
443	2	6 December 2015 (Note: Ski jumping part of competition in Lillehammer on 6 December scheduled on large hill was moved to normal hill because of strong wind forecast.)	(Norway) Lillehammer	Lysgårdsbakken	HS100 / 10 km	(Norway) Magnus Krog	(Germany) Fabian Rießle	(Austria) Lukas Klapfer	(Germany) Fabian Rießle	
444	3	19 December 2015	(Austria) Ramsau	W90-Mattensprunganlage	HS98 / 10 km	(Norway) Magnus Moan	(Norway) Magnus Krog	(Norway) Jarl Magnus Riiber	(Norway) Magnus Krog	
445	4	20 December 2015	(Austria) Ramsau	W90-Mattensprunganlage	HS98 / 10 km	(Germany) Eric Frenzel	(Norway) Jarl Magnus Riiber	(Germany) Manuel Faißt	(Norway) Magnus Krog	
		2 January 2016	(Germany) Klingenthal	Vogtland Arena	HS140 / 10 km	lack of snow and warm temperatures; rescheduled to Schonach				
		3 January 2016	(Germany) Klingenthal	Vogtland Arena	HS140 / 10 km	lack of snow and warm temperatures				
		9 January 2016	(Germany) Schonach	Langenwaldschanze	HS106 / 10 km	lack of snow and warm temperatures; rescheduled to March				
446	5	23 January 2016	(France) Chaux-Neuve	La Côté Feuillée	HS118 / 10 km	(Germany) Eric Frenzel	(Austria) Bernhard Gruber	(Japan) Akito Watabe	(Germany) Fabian Rießle	
447	6	24 January 2016	(France) Chaux-Neuve	La Côté Feuillée	HS118 / 10 km	(Germany) Fabian Rießle	(Germany) Eric Frenzel	(Japan) Akito Watabe	(Germany) Fabian Rießle	
3rd Nordic Combined Triple Overall (29–31 Jan)
448	7	29 January 2016	(Austria) Seefeld	Toni-Seelos-Olympiaschanze	HS109 / 5 km	(Germany) Eric Frenzel	(Japan) Akito Watabe	(Germany) Fabian Rießle	(Germany) Fabian Rießle	
449	8	30 January 2016	(Austria) Seefeld	Toni-Seelos-Olympiaschanze	HS109 / 10 km	(Germany) Eric Frenzel	(Japan) Akito Watabe	(Germany) Fabian Rießle	(Germany) Eric Frenzel	
450	9	31 January 2016	(Austria) Seefeld	Toni-Seelos-Olympiaschanze	HS109 / 10 km	(Germany) Eric Frenzel	(Japan) Akito Watabe	(Germany) Fabian Rießle	(Germany) Eric Frenzel	
451	10	6 February 2016	(Norway) Oslo	Holmenkollbakken	HS134 / 10 km	(Norway) Jarl Magnus Riiber	(Japan) Akito Watabe	(Germany) Eric Frenzel	(Germany) Eric Frenzel	
452	11	9 February 2016 (Note: Cancelled event from 28 November 2015 in Ruka was replaced in Trondheim on 9 February 2016.)	(Norway) Trondheim	Granåsen	HS140 / 10 km	(Norway) Jørgen Graabak	(Germany) Eric Frenzel	(Norway) Jarl Magnus Riiber	(Germany) Eric Frenzel	
453	12	10 February 2016	(Norway) Trondheim	Granåsen	HS140 / 10 km	(Germany) Eric Frenzel	(Japan) Akito Watabe	(Norway) Jørgen Graabak	(Germany) Eric Frenzel	
454	13	19 February 2016	(Finland) Lahti	Salpausselkä	HS130 / 10 km	(Germany) Eric Frenzel	(Japan) Akito Watabe	(Norway) Jan Schmid	(Germany) Eric Frenzel	
455	14	21 February 2016 (Note: Cancelled event from 29 November 2015 in Ruka was replaced in Lahti on 21 February 2016.)	(Finland) Lahti	Salpausselkä	HS130 / 10 km	(Germany) Fabian Rießle	(Germany) Eric Frenzel	(Japan) Akito Watabe	(Germany) Eric Frenzel	
456	15	23 February 2016	(Finland) Kuopio	Puijo	HS127 / 10 km	(Germany) Johannes Rydzek	(Japan) Akito Watabe	(Austria) Wilhelm Denifl	(Germany) Eric Frenzel	
457	16	27 February 2016	(Italy) Val di Fiemme	Trampolino dal Ben	HS134 / 10 km	(Austria) Bernhard Gruber	(Germany) Eric Frenzel	(Norway) Jørgen Graabak	(Germany) Eric Frenzel	
458	17	28 February 2016 (Note: Originally HS 134 / 15 km Gundersen event in Val di Fiemme on 28 January 2016 was replaced with HS 134 / 10 km event)	(Italy) Val di Fiemme	Trampolino dal Ben	HS134 / 10 km	(Norway) Magnus Krog	(Norway) Jørgen Graabak	(Germany) Fabian Rießle	(Germany) Eric Frenzel	
459	18	5 March 2016 (Note: Cancelled event from 2 January 2016 in Klingenthal was replaced in Schonach on 5 March 2016.)	(Germany) Schonach	Langenwaldschanze	HS106 / 10 km	(Germany) Eric Frenzel	(Norway) Jan Schmid	(Japan) Akito Watabe	(Germany) Eric Frenzel	
460	19	6 March 2016 (Note: Originally scheduled individual event in Schonach on 9 January 2016 was rescheduled to 6 March 2016)	(Germany) Schonach	Langenwaldschanze	HS106 / 15 km	(Norway) Jørgen Graabak	(Germany) Fabian Rießle	(Austria) Lukas Klapfer	(Germany) Eric Frenzel	

=== Team ===
Num	Season	Date	Place	Hill	Discipline	Winner	Second	Third	Yellow bib	Ref.
		5 December 2015	(Norway) Lillehammer	Lysgårdsbakken	HS138 / 4x5 km	strong wind; replaced with an individual Gundersen				
		10 January 2016	(Germany) Schonach	Langenwaldschanze	HS106 / 4x5 km	lack of snow and warm temperatures; rescheduled to March				
31	1	20 February 2016	(Finland) Lahti	Salpausselkä	HS130 / 2x7.5 km Sprint	Germany I Johannes Rydzek; Fabian Rießle	Austria I Lukas Klapfer; Bernhard Gruber	Austria II Franz-Josef Rehrl; Philipp Orter	Germany	
32	2	26 February 2016	(Italy) Val di Fiemme	Trampolino dal Ben	HS134 / 2x7.5 km Sprint	Norway I Magnus Krog; Jørgen Graabak	Germany I Tobias Haug; Tino Edelmann	France I François Braud; Maxime Laheurte	Germany	
33	3	4 March 2016 (Note: Originally scheduled team event in Schonach on 10 January 2016 was rescheduled to 4 March 2016)	(Germany) Schonach	Langenwaldschanze	HS106 / 4x5 km	Norway Magnus Moan; Jan Schmid; Magnus Krog; Jørgen Graabak	Germany Manuel Faißt; Eric Frenzel; Johannes Rydzek; Fabian Rießle	Austria Bernhard Gruber; Bernhard Flaschberger; Lukas Klapfer; Philipp Orter	Germany	

== Standings ==
=== Overall ===
Rank		Points
1	(Germany) Eric Frenzel	1389
2	(Japan) Akito Watabe	1070
3	(Germany) Fabian Rießle	1064
4	(Norway) Jørgen Graabak	908
5	(Germany) Johannes Rydzek	685
6	(Norway) Magnus Krog	666
7	(Austria) Bernhard Gruber	618
8	(Norway) Jan Schmid	595
9	(Austria) Lukas Klapfer	577
10	(Finland) Ilkka Herola	373

- Final standings after 19 events.

=== Nations Cup ===
Rank		Points
1	Germany	4662
2	Norway	4317
3	Austria	3019
4	Japan	1858
5	France	1100
6	Finland	606
7	Italy	558
8	United States	440
9	Czech Republic	289
10	Switzerland	158

- Final standings after 22 events.

=== Prize money ===
Rank		CHF
1	(Germany) Eric Frenzel	102700
2	(Germany) Fabian Rießle	74840
3	(Japan) Akito Watabe	71720
4	(Norway) Jørgen Graabak	63460
5	(Norway) Magnus Krog	46690
6	(Germany) Johannes Rydzek	39610
7	(Austria) Bernhard Gruber	37325
8	(Norway) Jan Schmid	31730
9	(Austria) Lukas Klapfer	29550
10	(Norway) Jarl Magnus Riiber	24750

- Final standings after 22 events.

== Achievements ==
First World Cup career victory

- Fabian Rießle (GER), 24, in his 7th season – the WC 1 in Lillehammer; first podium was 2011–12 in Oberstdorf
- Jarl Magnus Riiber (NOR), 18, in his 2nd season – the WC 10 in Oslo, first podium was 2014–15 in Seefeld

First World Cup podium

- Ilkka Herola (FIN), 20, in his 2nd season – no. 3 in the WC 1 in Lillehammer
- Manuel Faißt (GER), 22, in his 7th season – no. 3 in the WC 4 in Ramsau

Victories in this World Cup (in brackets victory for all time)

- Eric Frenzel (GER), 8 (31) first places
- Fabian Rießle (GER), 3 (3) first places
- Magnus Krog (NOR), 2 (3) first places
- Jørgen Graabak (NOR), 2 (3) first places
- Magnus Moan (NOR), 1 (25) first place
- Bernhard Gruber (AUT), 1 (6) first place
- Johannes Rydzek (GER), 1 (6) first place
- Jarl Magnus Riiber (NOR), 1 (1) first place

== Retirements ==
Following are notable Nordic combined skiers who announced their retirement:

- Ole Martin Storlien (NOR)
- Petr Kutal (CZE)
- Tino Edelmann (GER)
