= 2010–11 FIS Nordic Combined World Cup =

International skiing competition

Nordic Combined World Cup 2010/11
Winners
- Overall: (France) Jason Lamy-Chappuis
- Nations Cup: Austria

Competitions
- Venues: 7
- Individual: 13
- Team: 1
- Cancelled: 1

The 2010/11 FIS Nordic Combined World Cup was the 28th world cup season, a combination of ski jumping and cross-country skiing organized by FIS. It started on 26 November 2010 in Kuusamo, Finland and ended on 12 March 2011 in Lahti, Finland.

== Calendar ==
=== Men ===
Num	Season	Date	Place	Hill	Discipline	Winner	Second	Third	Ref.
355	1	26 November 2010	(Finland) Kuusamo	Rukatunturi	HS142 / 10 km	(France) Jason Lamy-Chappuis	(Germany) Eric Frenzel	(Austria) Mario Stecher	
356	2	27 November 2010	(Finland) Kuusamo	Rukatunturi	HS142 / 10 km	(Austria) Felix Gottwald	(Norway) Mikko Kokslien	(France) Jason Lamy-Chappuis	
357	3	4 December 2010	(Norway) Lillehammer	Lysgårdsbakken	HS138 / 10 km	(Norway) Mikko Kokslien	(France) Jason Lamy-Chappuis	(Austria) Felix Gottwald	
358	4	5 December 2010	(Norway) Lillehammer	Lysgårdsbakken	HS138 / 10 km	(France) Jason Lamy-Chappuis	(Norway) Mikko Kokslien	(Austria) Mario Stecher	
359	5	18 December 2010	(Austria) Ramsau	W90-Mattensprunganlage	HS98 / 10 km	(Austria) Mario Stecher	(Germany) Björn Kircheisen	(Germany) Johannes Rydzek	
360	6	19 December 2010	(Austria) Ramsau	W90-Mattensprunganlage	HS98 / 10 km	(Austria) Mario Stecher	(Germany) Tino Edelmann	(Germany) Eric Frenzel	
361	7	8 January 2011	(Germany) Schonach	Langenwaldschanze	HS106 / 10 km	(Austria) Felix Gottwald	(Austria) Mario Stecher	(Austria) Bernhard Gruber	
362	8	15 January 2011	(Austria) Seefeld	Toni-Seelos-Olympiaschanze	HS109 / 10 km	(France) Jason Lamy-Chappuis	(Norway) Magnus Moan	(Norway) Mikko Kokslien	
363	9	16 January 2011	(Austria) Seefeld	Toni-Seelos-Olympiaschanze	HS109 / 10 km	(Norway) Magnus Moan	(France) Jason Lamy-Chappuis	(Austria) David Kreiner	
364	10	22 January 2011	(France) Chaux-Neuve	La Côté Feuillée	HS117 / 10 km	(Austria) David Kreiner	(Norway) Mikko Kokslien	(Austria) Felix Gottwald	
365	11	23 January 2011	(France) Chaux-Neuve	La Côté Feuillée	HS117 / 10 km	(France) Jason Lamy-Chappuis	(Austria) Felix Gottwald	(Norway) Mikko Kokslien	
FIS Nordic World Ski Championships 2011
366	12	11 March 2011	(Finland) Lahti	Salpausselkä	HS130 / 10 km	(Germany) Björn Kircheisen	(Germany) Eric Frenzel	(France) Jason Lamy-Chappuis	
367	13	12 March 2011	(Finland) Lahti	Salpausselkä	HS130 / 10 km	(Germany) Johannes Rydzek	(Germany) Eric Frenzel	(Austria) Felix Gottwald	

=== Team ===
Num	Season	Date	Place	Hill	Discipline	Winner	Second	Third	Ref.
		9 January 2011	(Germany) Schonach	Langenwaldschanze	HS106 / 4 x 5 km	wind and heavy rain; rescheduled to Seefeld			
12	1	14 January 2011	(Austria) Seefeld (Note: Rescheduled from 9 January 2011 in Schonach.)	Toni-Seelos-Olympiaschanze	HS106 / 4 x 5 km	Norway Magnus Moan; Håvard Klemetsen; Jan Schmid; Mikko Kokslien	Austria Felix Gottwald; Wilhelm Denifl; David Kreiner; Bernhard Gruber	France François Braud; Maxime Laheurte; Sébastien Lacroix; Jason Lamy-Chappuis	

== Standings ==
=== Overall ===
Rank		Points
1	(France) Jason Lamy-Chappuis	894
2	(Norway) Mikko Kokslien	656
3	(Austria) Felix Gottwald	638
4	(Germany) Eric Frenzel	554
5	(Austria) Mario Stecher	481
6	(Germany) Johannes Rydzek	442
7	(Germany) Björn Kircheisen	435
8	(Norway) Jan Schmid	394
9	(Germany) Tino Edelmann	389
10	(Austria) David Kreiner	346

Rank		Points
11	(Japan) Akito Watabe	315
12	(Norway) Magnus Moan	293
13	(Italy) Lukas Runggaldier	274
14	(Norway) Håvard Klemetsen	256
15	(France) Sébastien Lacroix	245
16	(Austria) Bernhard Gruber	231
17	(Austria) Wilhelm Denifl	217
18	(Finland) Janne Ryynänen	212
19	(France) François Braud	193
20	(Austria) Christoph Bieler	128

Rank		Points
21	(Switzerland) Seppi Hurschler	120
21	(Italy) Alessandro Pittin	120
23	(Czech Republic) Miroslav Dvořák	106
23	(Norway) Espen Rian	106
25	(United States) Todd Lodwick	103
26	(France) Maxime Laheurte	97
27	(Switzerland) Ronny Heer	88
28	(Czech Republic) Tomáš Slavík	86
29	(Austria) Lukas Klapfer	84
30	(United States) Bryan Fletcher	75

- Standings after 13 events.

=== Nations Cup ===
Rank		Points
1	Austria	2586
2	Norway	2230
3	Germany	2148
4	France	1729
5	Japan	653
6	Italy	629
7	United States	322
8	Switzerland	305
9	Finland	251
10	Czech Republic	208

- Standings after 15 events.
