= Eric Frenzel =

German Nordic combined skier

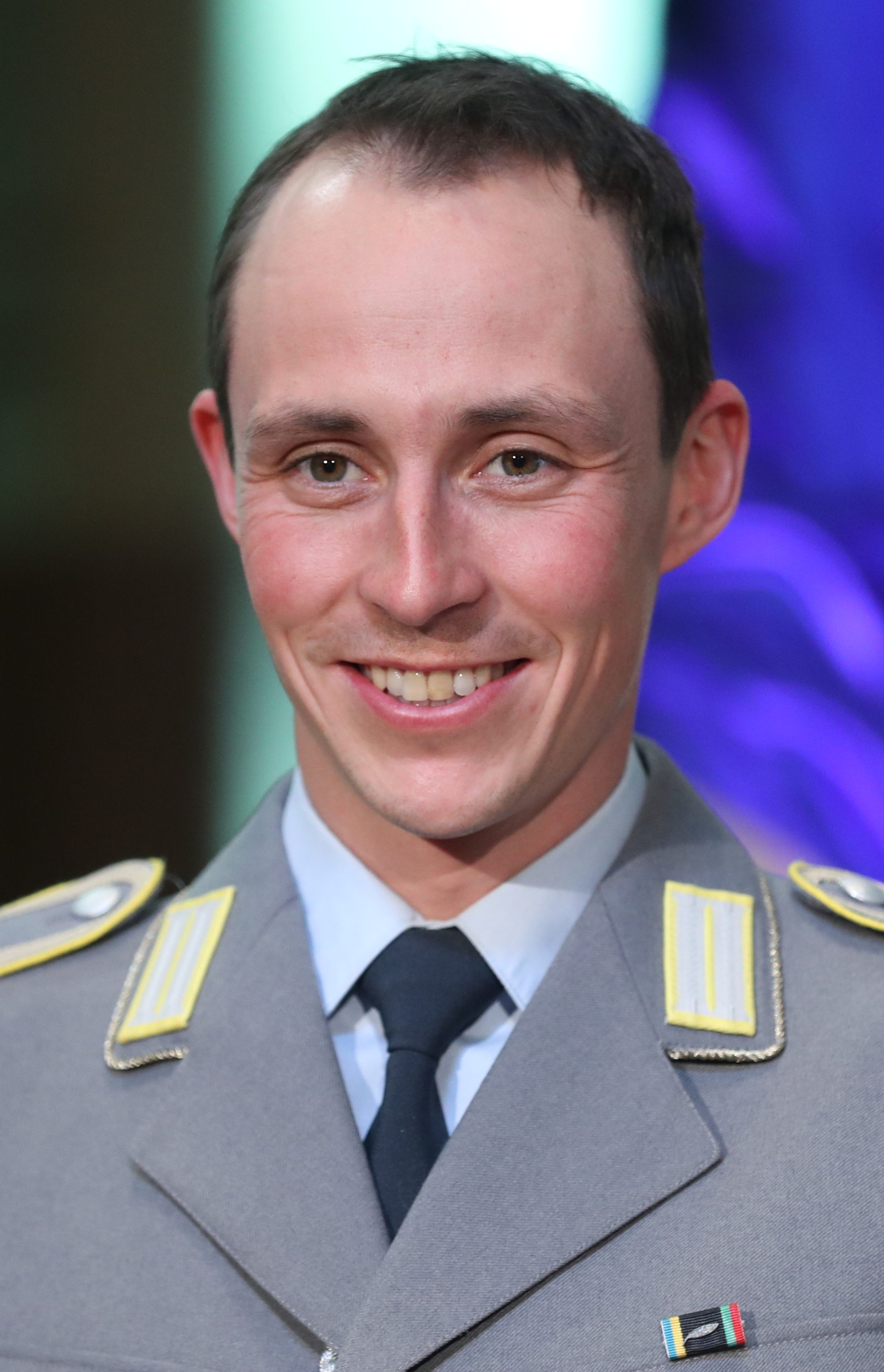
- Frenzel in 2022

Personal information
- Nationality: Germany
- Born: 21 November 1988 (age 37) Annaberg-Buchholz, East Germany
- Height: 1.76 m (5 ft 9 in)

Sport
- Sport: Skiing
- Club: WSC Erzgebirge; Oberwiesenthal

World Cup career
- Seasons: 2007–2023
- Indiv. starts: 270
- Indiv. podiums: 83
- Indiv. wins: 43
- Team starts: 33
- Team podiums: 24
- Team wins: 11
- Overall titles: 5 (2013, 2014, 2015, 2016, 2017)

Achievements and titles
- Personal bests: 198.5 m (651 ft); Oberstdorf, 17 March 2022
Medal record
Men's Nordic combined
Representing Germany
Olympic Games
Gold medal – first place	2014 Sochi	Individual NH
Gold medal – first place	2018 Pyeongchang	Individual NH
Gold medal – first place	2018 Pyeongchang	Team LH
Silver medal – second place	2014 Sochi	Team LH
Silver medal – second place	2022 Beijing	Team LH
Bronze medal – third place	2010 Vancouver	Team LH
Bronze medal – third place	2018 Pyeongchang	Individual LH
Nordic World Ski Championships
Gold medal – first place	2011 Oslo	Individual NH
Gold medal – first place	2013 Val di Fiemme	Individual LH
Gold medal – first place	2015 Falun	Team NH
Gold medal – first place	2017 Lahti	Team sprint
Gold medal – first place	2017 Lahti	Team NH
Gold medal – first place	2019 Seefeld	Individual LH
Gold medal – first place	2019 Seefeld	Team sprint
Silver medal – second place	2009 Liberec	Team LH
Silver medal – second place	2011 Oslo	Team NH
Silver medal – second place	2011 Oslo	Team LH
Silver medal – second place	2015 Falun	Team sprint
Silver medal – second place	2017 Lahti	Individual NH
Silver medal – second place	2019 Seefeld	Team NH
Silver medal – second place	2021 Oberstdorf	Team NH
Silver medal – second place	2023 Planica	Team LH
Bronze medal – third place	2011 Oslo	Individual LH
Bronze medal – third place	2013 Val di Flemme	Team sprint
Bronze medal – third place	2021 Oberstdorf	Team sprint

Eric Frenzel (born 21 November 1988) is a German former Nordic combined skier and current discipline coach for the German Nordic combined team.

== Career ==
One of the most successful Nordic combined athletes of all time. He won the Olympic gold medals in the 10km individual normal hill at the 2014 Winter Olympics and 10km individual normal hill at the 2018 Winter Olympics. He won a bronze medal in the 4 x 5 km team event at the 2010 Winter Olympics in Vancouver, a silver medal in the 4 x 5 km team event at the 2014 Winter Olympics in Sochi and the gold medal in the 4 x 5 km team event at the 2018 Winter Olympics in Pyeongchang.

Frenzel won a silver medal in the 4 x 5 km team event at the FIS Nordic World Ski Championships 2009 in Liberec and earned his best individual finish of eighth in the 10 km mass start at those same championships. Later he won three individual gold medals and four team gold medals in the next editions of FIS Nordic World Ski Championships.

== Record ==
=== Olympic Games ===
Event	Normal hill	Large hill	Team relay
2010	10	40	Bronze
2014	Gold	10	Silver
2018	Gold	Bronze	Gold
2022	-	-	Silver

=== World Championship ===
Year	Individual LH	Individual NH	Team	Team sprint/ Mixed team
2007	–	22	—	—
2009	29	34	Silver	8
2011	Bronze	Gold	Silver	Silver
2013	Gold	4	6	Bronze
2015	10	4	Gold	Silver
2017	7	Silver	Gold	Gold
2019	Gold	16	Silver	Gold
2021	4	4	Silver	Bronze
2023	—	10	Silver	—

== World Cup ==
=== Standings ===
Season	Overall	SP
2006/07	–	–
2007/08	7	9
2008/09	11	N/A
2009/10	4	N/A
2010/11	4	N/A
2011/12	6	N/A
2012/13	1st place, gold medalist(s)	N/A
2013/14	1st place, gold medalist(s)	N/A
2014/15	1st place, gold medalist(s)	N/A
2015/16	1st place, gold medalist(s)	N/A
2016/17	1st place, gold medalist(s)	N/A
2017/18	8	N/A
2018/19	12	N/A
2019/20	7	N/A
2020/21	5	N/A

=== Individual victories ===
No.	Season	Date	Location	Hill	Size	Discipline
1	2007/08	20 January 2008	(Germany) Klingenthal	Vogtland Arena HS140	LH	Massenstart
2	2009/10	30 January 2010	(Austria) Seefeld	Toni-Seelos-Olympiaschanze HS100	NH	Gundersen
3	2011/12	4 December 2011	(Norway) Lillehammer	Lysgårdsbakken HS138	LH	Penalty Race
4	2012/13	19 January 2013	(Austria) Seefeld	Toni-Seelos-Olympiaschanze HS109	NH	Gundersen
5	2012/13	20 January 2013	(Austria) Seefeld	Toni-Seelos-Olympiaschanze HS109	NH	Gundersen
6	2012/13	26 January 2013	(Germany) Klingenthal	Vogtland Arena HS140	LH	Gundersen
7	2012/13	27 January 2013	(Germany) Klingenthal	Vogtland Arena HS140	LH	Penalty Race
8	2012/13	8 March 2013	(Finland) Lahti	Salpausselkä HS130	LH	Gundersen
9	2012/13	15 March 2013	(Norway) Oslo	Holmenkollbakken HS134	LH	Gundersen
10	2013/14	30 November 2013	(Finland) Kuusamo	Rukatunturi HS142	LH	Gundersen
11	2013/14	8 December 2013	(Norway) Lillehammer	Lysgårdsbakken HS138	LH	Gundersen
12	2013/14	15 December 2013	(Austria) Ramsau	W90-Mattensprunganlage HS98	NH	Gundersen
13	2013/14	17 January 2014	(Austria) Seefeld	Toni-Seelos-Olympiaschanze HS109	NH	Sprint
14	2013/14	18 January 2014	(Austria) Seefeld	Toni-Seelos-Olympiaschanze HS109	NH	Gundersen
15	2013/14	19 January 2014	(Austria) Seefeld	Toni-Seelos-Olympiaschanze HS109	NH	Gundersen
16	2013/14	26 January 2014	(Germany) Oberstdorf	Schattenbergschanze HS137	LH	Gundersen
17	2014/15	6 December 2014	(Norway) Lillehammer	Lysgårdsbakken HS138	LH	Gundersen
18	2014/15	10 January 2015	(France) Chaux-Neuve	La Côté Feuillée HS118	LH	Gundersen
19	2014/15	16 January 2015	(Austria) Seefeld	Toni-Seelos-Olympiaschanze HS109	NH	Sprint
20	2014/15	17 January 2015	(Austria) Seefeld	Toni-Seelos-Olympiaschanze HS109	NH	Gundersen
21	2014/15	18 January 2015	(Austria) Seefeld	Toni-Seelos-Olympiaschanze HS109	NH	Gundersen
22	2014/15	23 January 2015	(Japan) Sapporo	Ōkurayama HS134	LH	Gundersen
23	2014/15	24 January 2015	(Japan) Sapporo	Ōkurayama HS134	LH	Gundersen
24	2015/16	20 December 2015	(Austria) Ramsau	W90-Mattensprunganlage HS98	NH	Gundersen
25	2015/16	23 January 2016	(France) Chaux-Neuve	La Côté Feuillée HS118	LH	Gundersen
26	2015/16	29 January 2016	(Austria) Seefeld	Toni-Seelos-Olympiaschanze HS109	NH	Sprint
27	2015/16	30 January 2016	(Austria) Seefeld	Toni-Seelos-Olympiaschanze HS109	NH	Gundersen
28	2015/16	31 January 2016	(Austria) Seefeld	Toni-Seelos-Olympiaschanze HS109	NH	Gundersen
29	2015/16	10 February 2016	(Norway) Trondheim	Granåsen HS140	LH	Gundersen
30	2015/16	19 February 2016	(Finland) Lahti	Salpausselkä HS130	LH	Gundersen
31	2015/16	5 March 2016	(Germany) Schonach	Langenwaldschanze HS106	NH	Gundersen
32	2016/17	3 December 2016	(Norway) Lillehammer	Lysgårdsbakken HS100	NH	Gundersen
33	2016/17	4 December 2016	(Norway) Lillehammer	Lysgårdsbakken HS138	LH	Gundersen
34	2016/17	18 December 2016	(Austria) Ramsau	W90-Mattensprunganlage HS98	NH	Gundersen
35	2016/17	7 January 2017	(Finland) Lahti	Salpausselkä HS130	LH	Gundersen
36	2016/17	13 January 2017	(Italy) Val di Fiemme	Trampolino dal Ben HS134	LH	Gundersen
37	2016/17	15 January 2017	(Italy) Val di Fiemme	Trampolino dal Ben HS134	LH	Gundersen
38	2016/17	29 January 2017	(Austria) Seefeld	Toni-Seelos-Olympiaschanze HS109	NH	Gundersen
39	2016/17	15 March 2017	(Norway) Trondheim	Granåsen HS140	LH	Gundersen
40	2016/17	18 March 2017	(Germany) Schonach	Langenwaldschanze HS106	NH	Gundersen
41	2016/17	19 March 2017	(Germany) Schonach	Langenwaldschanze HS106	NH	Gundersen
42	2017/18	16 December 2017	(Austria) Ramsau	W90-Mattensprunganlage HS98	NH	Gundersen
43	2017/18	13 March 2018	(Norway) Trondheim	Granåsen HS140	LH	Gundersen

Olympic Games
Preceded by Maria Höfl-Riesch	Flagbearer for Germany; Pyeongchang 2018	Succeeded by Francesco Friedrich Claudia Pechstein
