= Nordic combined at the 2010 Winter Olympics =

Nordic combined at the XXI Olympic Winter Games
- Venue: Whistler Olympic Park
- Dates: 14–25 February 2010
- Competitors: 55 from 14 nations

The Nordic combined competition of the 2010 Winter Olympics was held at Whistler Olympic Park. The events were held between 14 and 25 February 2010. Sprint and individual Gundersen events of 7.5 km and 15 km events were replaced by two 10 km individual events with one jump each from the normal and large hills respectively. Team event went from two jumps down for one jump per team member. This was done during the 2008–09 Nordic Combined World Cup season and was also applied to the FIS Nordic World Ski Championships 2009 in Liberec, Czech Republic.

== Medal summary ==
=== Medal table ===
Rank	Nation	Gold	Silver	Bronze	Total
1	United States	1	3	0	4
2	Austria	1	0	1	2
3	France	1	0	0	1
4	Germany	0	0	1	1
4	Italy	0	0	1	1
Totals (5 entries)		3	3	3	9

=== Events ===
Three Nordic combined events were held in Vancouver 2010 (all participants are men):

Event	Gold		Silver		Bronze	
Individual large hill/10 km	Bill Demong; United States	25:32.9	Johnny Spillane; United States	25:36.9	Bernhard Gruber; Austria	25:43.7
Individual normal hill/10 km	Jason Lamy Chappuis; France	25:47.1	Johnny Spillane; United States	25:47.5	Alessandro Pittin; Italy	25:47.9
Team large hill/4 x 5 km	Austria; Bernhard Gruber; Felix Gottwald; Mario Stecher; David Kreiner	49:31.6	United States; Brett Camerota; Todd Lodwick; Johnny Spillane; Bill Demong	49:36.8	Germany; Johannes Rydzek; Tino Edelmann; Eric Frenzel; Björn Kircheisen	49:51.1

== Competition schedule ==
All times are Pacific Standard Time (UTC-8).

Day	Date	Start	Finish	Event
Day 3	Sunday 2010-02-14	10:00	10:50	Individual Normal Hill
Day 3	Sunday 2010-02-14	13:45	14:20	Individual 10 km
Day 12	Tuesday 2010-02-23	10:00	10:45	Team Large Hill
Day 12	Tuesday 2010-02-23	13:00	14:00	Team Relay
Day 14	Thursday 2010-02-25	10:00	10:50	Individual Large Hill
Day 14	Thursday 2010-02-25	13:00	13:35	Individual 10 km

== Qualification ==
For the three events, there are a maximum 55 athletes allowed to compete. No nation can have more than five skiers. For each event, no nation can enter more than four skiers per nation per individual event or one team per nation per relay race.

Host nation Canada is expected to enter skiers in all events. If no skier meets the qualification standards, they can enter one skier per event.

Quota allocation per nation was based on the World Ranking List (WRL) based on Nordic Combined World Cup and Grand Prix points, followed by Continental Cup Standings from the 2008–09 and 2009–10 Nordic Combined World Cup. This was made by assigning one quota slot per skier from the top of the standings downwards until the maximum five slots have been reached, including host nation Canada. When 50 slots are reached in an event where less than ten nations have a minimum of four skiers allocated slot (and the nation is entered in the team event), the next nation with three skiers will be given a fourth slot until ten nations can compete in the team event. Any open quota slots will be allocated until the maximum 55 skiers can be reached, including host nation Canada. This process started on 18 January 2010 and will run until 28 January 2010. Deadline to VANOC is 1 February 2010.

If a skier from a nation selected for an event cannot compete due to injury or force majeure prior to the start of the first event based on quota allocation, a replacement can be used once the removed skier surrenders their accreditation prior to their replacement can be accredited.

== Participating nations ==
A quota list was released by the FIS on 18 January 2010.

14 countries participated.

- Austria (5 athletes)
- Canada (1)
- Czech Republic (4)
- Finland (5)
- France (5)
- Germany (5)
- Italy (4)
- Japan (5)
- Norway (5)
- Russia (2)
- Slovenia (3)
- Switzerland (5)
- Ukraine (1)
- United States (5)
