= FIS Nordic World Ski Championships 2019 – Team sprint large hill/2 × 7,5 km =

Team sprint large hill/2 × 7,5 km at the FIS Nordic World Ski Championships 2019
- Location: Seefeld in Tirol, Austria
- Dates: 24 February
- Competitors: 30 from 15 nations
- Teams: 15
- Winning time: 28:29.5

Medalists
| gold medal | Eric Frenzel; Fabian Rießle | Germany |
| silver medal | Jan Schmid; Jarl Magnus Riiber | Norway |
| bronze medal | Franz-Josef Rehrl; Bernhard Gruber | Austria |

The Team sprint large hill/2 × 7,5 km competition at the FIS Nordic World Ski Championships 2019 was held on 24 February 2019.

== Results ==
=== Ski jumping ===
The ski jumping part was started at 10:30.

| Rank | Bib | Country | Distance (m) | Points | Time difference |
|---|---|---|---|---|---|
| 1 | 14 | Germany; Eric Frenzel; Fabian Rießle | 130.0; 128.0 | 258.2; 129.9; 128.3 | |
| 2 | 12 | Japan; Akito Watabe; Yoshito Watabe | 130.0; 124.5 | 254.1; 130.0; 124.1 | +0:08 |
| 3 | 13 | Austria; Bernhard Gruber; Franz-Josef Rehrl | 123.5; 128.5 | 247.2; 116.6; 130.6 | +0:22 |
| 4 | 15 | Norway; Jan Schmid; Jarl Magnus Riiber | 127.5; 123.0 | 244.6; 124.7; 119.9 | +0:27 |
| 5 | 10 | France; Maxime Laheurte; Antoine Gérard | 122.0; 110.0 | 209.3; 114.6; 94.7 | +1:38 |
| 6 | 8 | Poland; Paweł Słowiok; Szczepan Kupczak | 114.5; 115.5 | 205.6; 97.9; 107.7 | +1:45 |
| 7 | 9 | Italy; Aaron Kostner; Alessandro Pittin | 120.5; 109.5 | 204.0; 112.0; 92.0 | +1:48 |
| 8 | 11 | Finland; Eero Hirvonen; Ilkka Herola | 116.5; 103.0 | 182.7; 102.3; 80.4 | +2:31 |
| 9 | 7 | Czech Republic; Jan Vytrval; Tomáš Portyk | 109.5; 103.5 | 170.4; 90.5; 79.9 | +2:56 |
| 10 | 4 | Slovenia; Ožbej Jelen; Vid Vrhovnik | 106.5; 109.5 | 167.2; 81.2; 86.0 | +3:02 |
| 11 | 6 | United States; Taylor Fletcher; Ben Loomis | 105.0; 105.0 | 163.4; 81.1; 82.3 | +3:10 |
| 12 | 3 | Ukraine; Viktor Pasichnyk; Dmytro Mazurchuk | 105.5; 103.0 | 154.4; 82.3; 72.1 | +3:28 |
| 13 | 5 | Russia; Samir Mastiev; Viacheslav Barkov | 99.5; 105.0 | 145.5; 65.7; 79.8 | +3:45 |
| 14 | 1 | China; Zhao Jiawen; Zhao Zihe | 100.5; 87.5 | 110.7; 67.9; 42.8 | +4:55 |
| 15 | 2 | Kazakhstan; Chingiz Rakparov; Danil Glukhov | 100.0; 82.0 | 100.1; 70.5; 29.6 | +5:16 |

=== Cross-country skiing ===
The cross-country skiing part was started at 13:30.

| Rank | Bib | Country | Start time | Cross-country time | Rank | Finish time | Deficit |
|---|---|---|---|---|---|---|---|
| 1st place, gold medalist(s) | 1 | Germany; Eric Frenzel; Fabian Rießle | 0:00 | 28:29.5; 14:07.2; 14:22.3 | 6 | 28:29.5 | |
| 2nd place, silver medalist(s) | 4 | Norway; Jan Schmid; Jarl Magnus Riiber | 0:27 | 28:10.7; 14:10.5; 14:00.2 | 2 | 28:37.7 | +8.2 |
| 3rd place, bronze medalist(s) | 3 | Austria; Franz-Josef Rehrl; Bernhard Gruber | 0:22 | 28:16.7; 14:10.4; 14:06.3 | 4 | 28:38.7 | +9.2 |
| 4 | 2 | Japan; Yoshito Watabe; Akito Watabe | 0:08 | 29:17.9; 14:41.5; 14:36.4 | 12 | 29:25.9 | +56.4 |
| 5 | 7 | Italy; Aaron Kostner; Alessandro Pittin | 1:48 | 28:18.6; 14:10.6; 14:08.0 | 5 | 30:06.6 | +1:37.1 |
| 6 | 5 | France; Antoine Gérard; Maxime Laheurte | 1:38 | 28:36.1; 14:09.2; 14:26.9 | 7 | 30:14.1 | +1:44.6 |
| 7 | 8 | Finland; Ilkka Herola; Eero Hirvonen | 2:31 | 28:01.6; 14:00.1; 14:01.5 | 1 | 30:32.6 | +2:03.1 |
| 8 | 6 | Poland; Szczepan Kupczak; Paweł Słowiok | 1:45 | 29:14.9; 14:54.2; 14:20.7 | 11 | 30:59.9 | +2:30.4 |
| 9 | 11 | United States; Taylor Fletcher; Ben Loomis | 3:10 | 28:16.3; 13:57.5; 14:18.8 | 3 | 31:26.3 | +2:56.8 |
| 10 | 9 | Czech Republic; Jan Vytrval; Tomáš Portyk | 2:56 | 29:08.0; 14:49.1; 14:18.9 | 8 | 32:04.0 | +3:34.5 |
| 11 | 10 | Slovenia; Ožbej Jelen; Vid Vrhovnik | 3:02 | 29:10.8; 14:40.1; 14:30.7 | 10 | 32:12.8 | +3:43.3 |
| 12 | 13 | Russia; Samir Mastiev; Viacheslav Barkov | 3:45 | 29:10.0; 14:39.9; 14:30.1 | 9 | 32:55.0 | +4:25.5 |
| 13 | 12 | Ukraine; Viktor Pasichnyk; Dmytro Mazurchuk | 3:28 | Lapped | | | |
| 14 | 15 | Kazakhstan; Chingiz Rakparov; Danil Glukhov | 5:16 | Lapped | | | |
| 15 | 14 | China; Zhao Zihe; Zhao Jiawen | 4:55 | Lapped | | | |
