= Schwarzwaldpokal =

The Schwarzwaldpokal is a competition in Nordic combined. It is held since 1967 and since 1984 part of the FIS Nordic Combined World Cup.

== Winners ==
Season	Winner Men	Winner Women
1967	Edi Lengg (GER)	
1968	Alois Kälin (CHE)	
1969	Ralph Pöhland (GER)	
1970	Franz Keller (GER)	
1971	Hans Rudhart (GER)	
1972	Franz Keller (GER)	
1973	Franz Keller (GER)	
1974	Rauno Miettinen (FIN)	
1975	Rauno Miettinen (FIN)	
1976	Ulrich Wehling (GDR)	
1977	Ulrich Wehling (GDR)	
1978	Rauno Miettinen (FIN)	
1979	Jorma Etelälahti (FIN)	
1980	Uwe Dotzauer (GDR)	
1981	Jorma Etelälahti (FIN)	
1982	Uwe Dotzauer (GDR)	
1983	Cancelled	
1984	Thomas Müller (GER)	
1985	Hermann Weinbuch (GER)	
1986	Hermann Weinbuch (GER)	
1987	Hubert Schwarz (GER)	
1988	Klaus Sulzenbacher (AUT)	
1989	Hippolyt Kempf (CHE)	
1990	Cancelled	
1991	Fred Børre Lundberg (NOR)	
1992	Fabrice Guy (FRA)	
1993	Fred Børre Lundberg (NOR)	
1994	Kenji Ogiwara (JPN)	
1995	Fred Børre Lundberg (NOR)	
1996	Fred Børre Lundberg (NOR)	
1997	Samppa Lajunen (FIN)	
1998	Todd Lodwick (USA)	
1999	Bjarte Engen Vik (NOR)	
2000	Bjarte Engen Vik (NOR)	
2001	Cancelled	
2002	Felix Gottwald (AUT)	
2003	Cancelled	
2004	Todd Lodwick (USA)	
2005	Hannu Manninen (FIN)	
2006	Hannu Manninen (FIN)	
2007	Cancelled	
2008	Petter Tande (NOR)	
2009	Anssi Koivuranta (FIN)	
2010	Jason Lamy Chappuis (FRA)	
2011	Felix Gottwald (AUT)	
2012	Cancelled	
January 2013	Jason Lamy Chappuis (FRA)	
December 2013	Magnus Moan (NOR)	
2015	Lukas Klapfer (AUT)	
2016	Eric Frenzel (GER)	
2017	Eric Frenzel (GER)	
2018	Akito Watabe (JPN)	
2019	Bernhard Gruber (AUT)	
2020	Cancelled due to lack of snow	
2021	Cancelled due to lack of snow	
2022	Jarl Magnus Riiber (NOR)	
2023	Jens Lurås Oftebro (NOR)	
2024	Jarl Magnus Riiber (NOR)	Mari Leinan Lund (NOR)
2025	Jens Lurås Oftebro (NOR)	Ida Marie Hagen (NOR)

== See also ==
- Langenwaldschanze
