= Antoine Gérard =

French Nordic combined skier (born 1995)

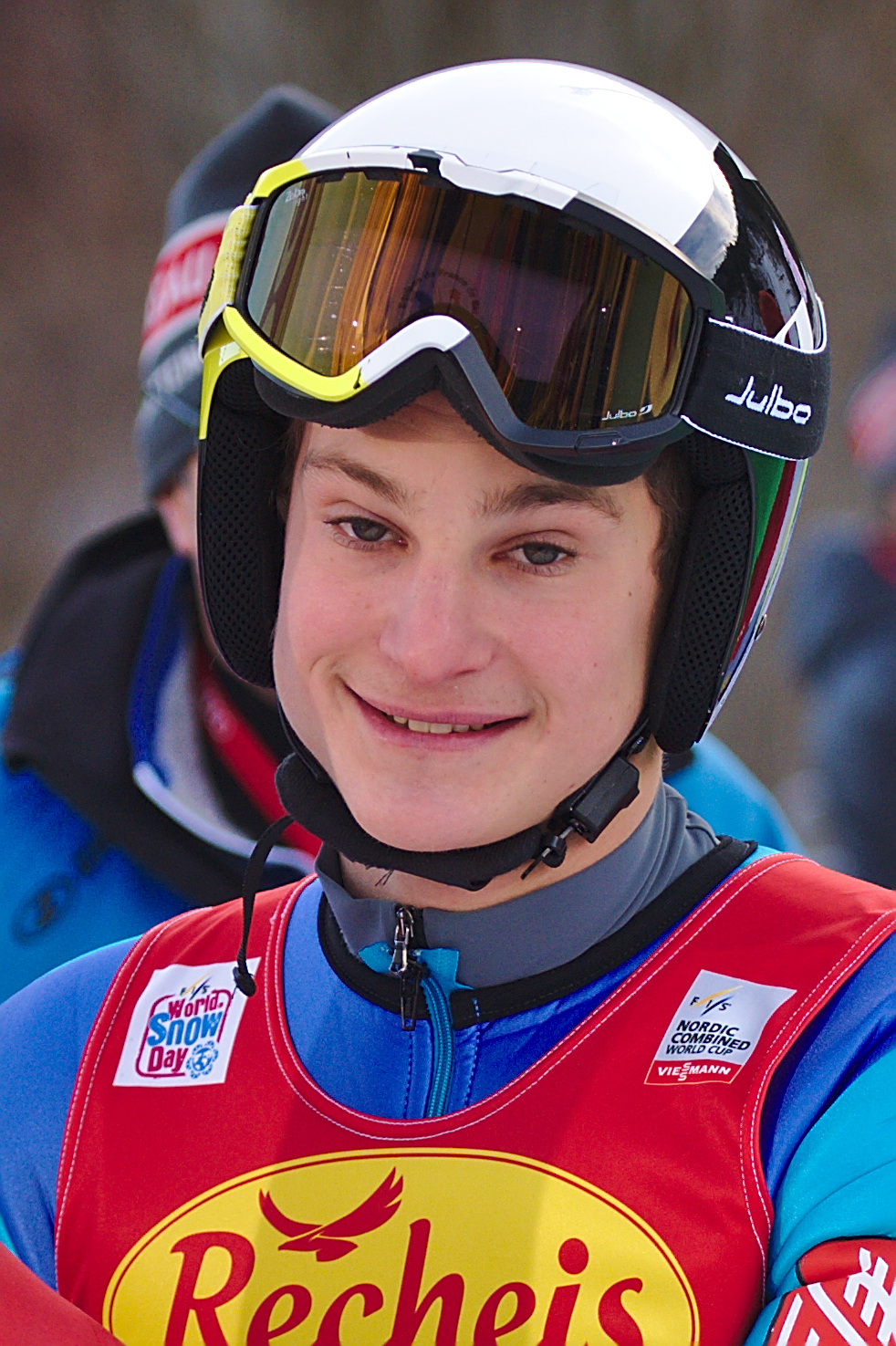
- Gérard in 2016

Personal information
- Nationality: France
- Born: 15 June 1995 (age 31) Remiremont, France

Sport
- Sport: Skiing
- Club: U.S Ventron

World Cup career
- Seasons: 2015–2024
- Indiv. starts: 154
- Indiv. podiums: 1 (Team event)
- Team podiums: 1

Antoine Gérard (born 15 June 1995) is a French former Nordic combined skier.

He competed at the 2018 Winter Olympics.
