= Kanzlersgrund =

Ski jumping venue in Oberhof, Germany

Coordinates: 50.6967°N 10.6803°E

Hans-Renner-Schanze Rennsteigschanze
- Kanzelsgrund
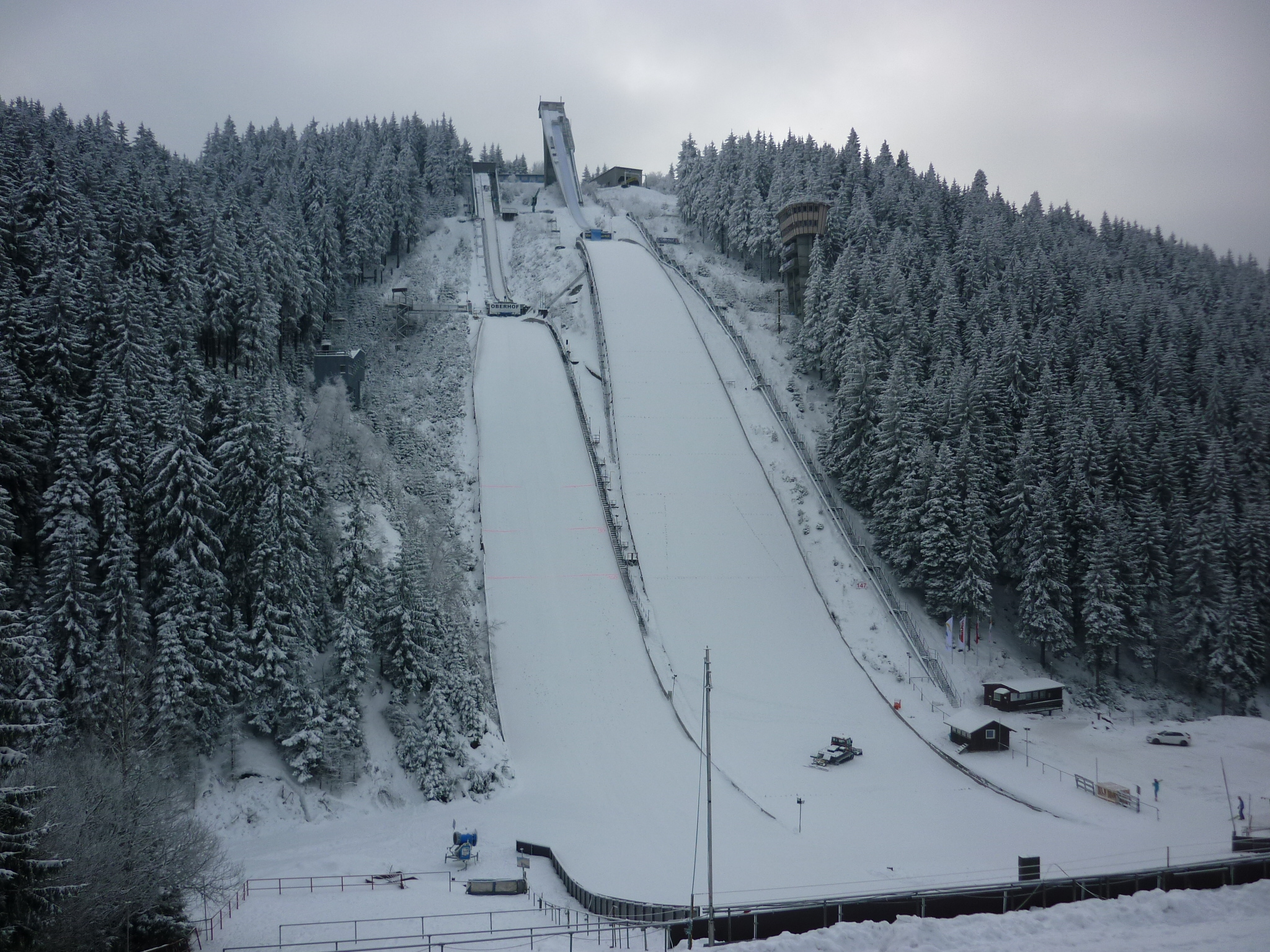
- Location: Oberhof; Germany
- Opened: 1959: Hans-Renner-Schanze (K-120); 1987: Rennsteigschanze (K-90)
- Renovated: 1979, 1986, 1995, 2000, 2014

Size
- K–point: K-90, K-120
- Hill size: HS 96, HS 140
- Hill record: (Finland) Anssi Koivuranta (147 m) (Germany) Jens Deimel (100 m)

Kanzlersgrund ski jump hills or Schanzenanlage im Kanzlersgrund (also known as Hans-Renner-Schanze, Rennsteigschanze or Schanze am Rennsteig) are ski jumping hills in Oberhof, Germany.

== History ==
Large hill was opened in 1959 and normal in 1987 and are owned by WSW Oberhof 05. It hosted four FIS Ski jumping World Cup events in 1989, 1991 and 2005 and more world cup events in Nordic combined. Anssi Koivuranta holds the hill record which is also the world record set on plastic mate.
