= Giuseppe Dal Ben Ski Jumping Arena =

Sports venue

Coordinates: 46.3299°N 11.6057°E

- Predazzo Ski Jumping Arena
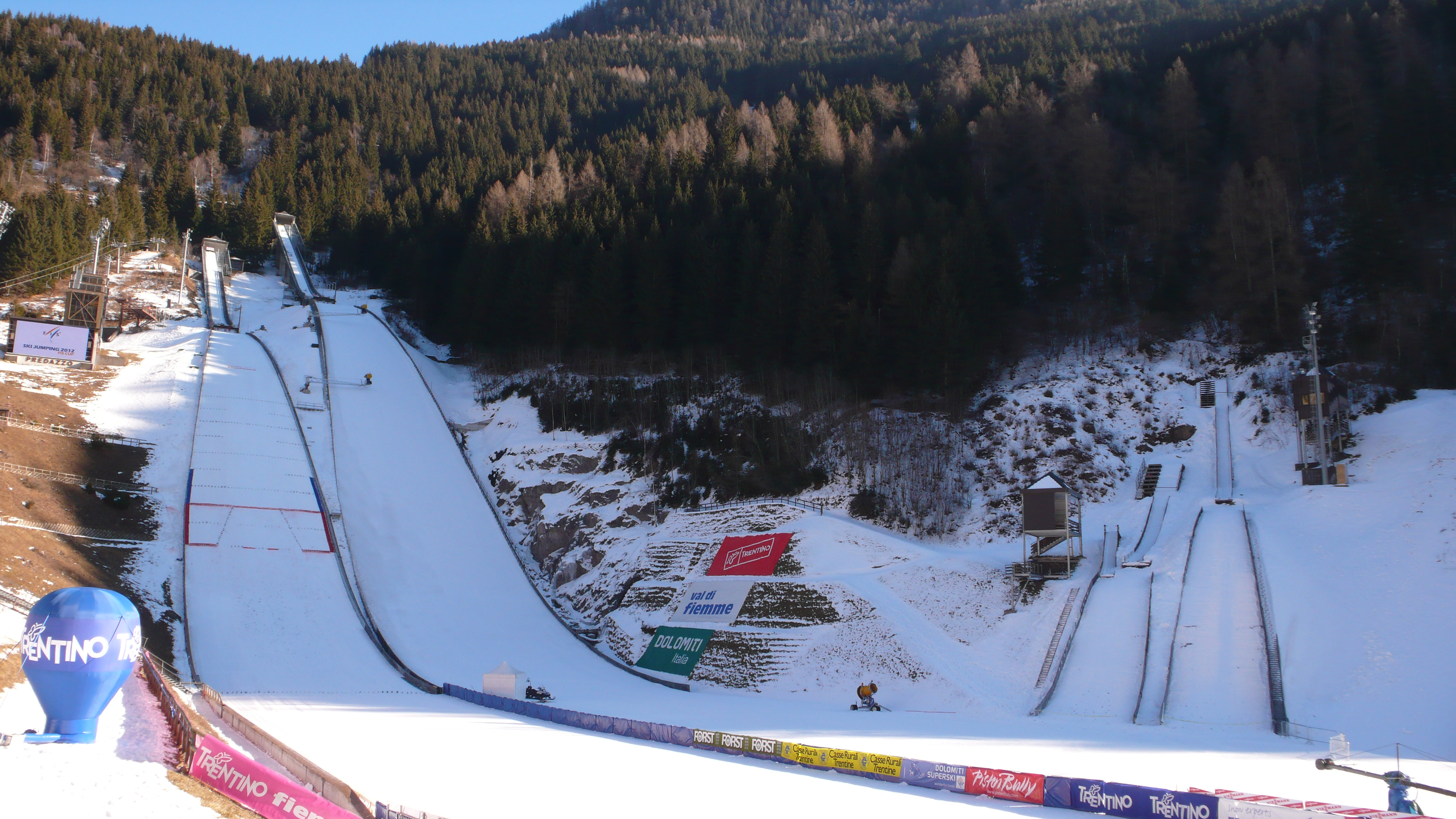
- Location: Predazzo; Italy
- Opened: 1988
- Renovated: 2001, 2025

Size
- K–point: K-98; K-128
- Hill size: HS109; HS143
- Hill record: (Slovenia) Domen Prevc (141.5 m in 2026) (Austria) Christoph Bieler (109.5 m in 2013)

Top events
- Olympics: 2026
- World Championships: 1991, 2003, 2013

The "Giuseppe Dal Ben" Ski Jumping Arena (in Italian: Stadio del salto "Giuseppe Dal Ben") is a ski jumping venue in Predazzo, Val di Fiemme, Trentino, in northern Italy. It is a venue in the FIS Ski jumping World Cup.

Opened in 1989, the venue hosted the ski jumping and Nordic combined events of three editions of FIS Nordic World Ski Championships (1991, 2003, 2013), of 2013 Winter Universiade, as well as many events of the Ski jumping World Cup. It hosted ski jumping and Nordic combined for the 2026 Winter Olympics in Milan and Cortina d'Ampezzo.

== History ==
In the mid-1930s, a ski jump was built on the Rolle Pass at an altitude of 1984 m above sea level, in the ski area between Predazzo and San Martino di Castrozza. At the time, the ski jump was managed by the local ski clubs of Val di Fiemme (G.S. Fiamme Gialle di Predazzo and U.S. Dolomitica). The Fiamme Gialle ski jump at Rolle Pass was modernised in 1973 and until the end of the 1980s it was approved by the International Ski Federation FIS as a K65 ski jump. Between 1979 and 1987 it also hosted competitions of the Alpen Cup and European Cup. After the construction of the new ski jump K65 in Stalimen in 1984, followed by the other jumps in 1989, the Rolle Pass ski jump was abandoned.

After the FIS Nordic World Ski Championships 1991 were awarded by the international committee meeting in Istanbul in 1988, the Predazzo jumping stadium was inaugurated in 1989. The cost of the construction of the sports facility, considered avant-garde at the time, was 14.5 billion lire, entirely financed by the Autonomous Province of Trento.

The Predazzo Arena hosted the ski jumping and Nordic combined competitions of the 1991 Nordic World Ski Championships, where Franci Petek was the last athlete to win a medal for Yugoslavia shortly before his country fell to the tragedy of war; in the same competition, Jens Weißflog was the first German athlete to win an individual medal for Germany after the reunification of East and West Germany.

The 2003 Nordic World Ski Championships were subsequently held there and again in 2013, as well as numerous stages of the Nordic Combined World Cup and Ski Jumping World Cup. In 2013 it hosted the competitions of the 2013 Winter Universiade.

In 2016, a K10 ski jump was added and the K20 and K30 ski jumps were renovated, all with new plastic covers. After 12 years of neglect, the K60 (HS66), one of the most important trampolines for developing young jumpers towards the K95, was also rebuilt in 2019.

In preparation for the 2026 Olympics, work began in the fall of 2022 to upgrade the facility at a cost of approximately €36 million. This includes the modernization of the two main ski jumps, the upgrading of the lighting system, renovation of the stands, construction of a new judges' tower, and installation of an inclined elevator to replace the old chairlift. From February 7 to 16, the ski jumping competitions will be held, while from February 11 to 19, the Nordic combined jumping events will take place, with the facility named Predazzo Ski Jumping Stadium for the event.

== Venue ==
The 3,000 metres (9,800 ft) area consists of two main ski jumping hills (HS 134 and HS 106), other training hills (K35 and K62) and facilities for athletes, judges, federations, journalists, media, and spectators. The hills are covered with ceramic material and landing areas are covered with plastic material, guaranteeing the functionality throughout the year also in summer. The lighting system also allows competitions events by night.

The main building hosts also the Organising Committee of the cross-country ski event "Marcialonga", that every January passes through the arena.

The nearby gondola lift complex runs to the slopes of Ski Center Latemar in winter, and in summer to the alpine trails on the mountain Latemar, part of the UNESCO world heritage site of Dolomites.

== Details ==
The two main trampolines are a HS 136 with point K 120 (long trampoline) and a HS 106 (since 2017 reverted to HS104) with point K 95 (normal trampoline); both official distance records (136 and 107.5 m) belong to polish Adam Małysz, who set them in 2003 (in 2019 Ryōyū Kobayashi equalled the World Cup record of 136 metres). The unofficial record from the long jump, however, was set by German Eric Frenzel at the Nordic World Ski Championships in 2013 (138.5 m), while in 2016 Samuel Costa recorded a jump of 142 m in the Nordic combined.

There are also four school jumps, which can be used both in winter and summer:

1. K60: HS 66
2. Stalimen school: HS 35 (point K 33)
3. Fiamme Gialle: HS 20 (point K 19)
4. Baby: HS 16 (point K 15)

=== Long trampoline ===
- Chute length: 115.36 m
- Maximum chute slope: 30°
- Minimum slide slope: 10.5°
- Chute width: 3 m
- Threshold length: 7 m
- Landing slope: 34.9°
- Point K: 120 m
- Hill size (HS): 136 m

=== Normal trampoline ===
- Chute length: 92.58 m
- Maximum chute slope: 30°
- Minimum chute slope: 10.5°
- Threshold length: 6.5 m
- Threshold height: 2.38 m
- Landing slope: 34.99°
- K point: 95 m
- Hill size (HS): 104 m (106 m until 2017)

== Main events hosted ==
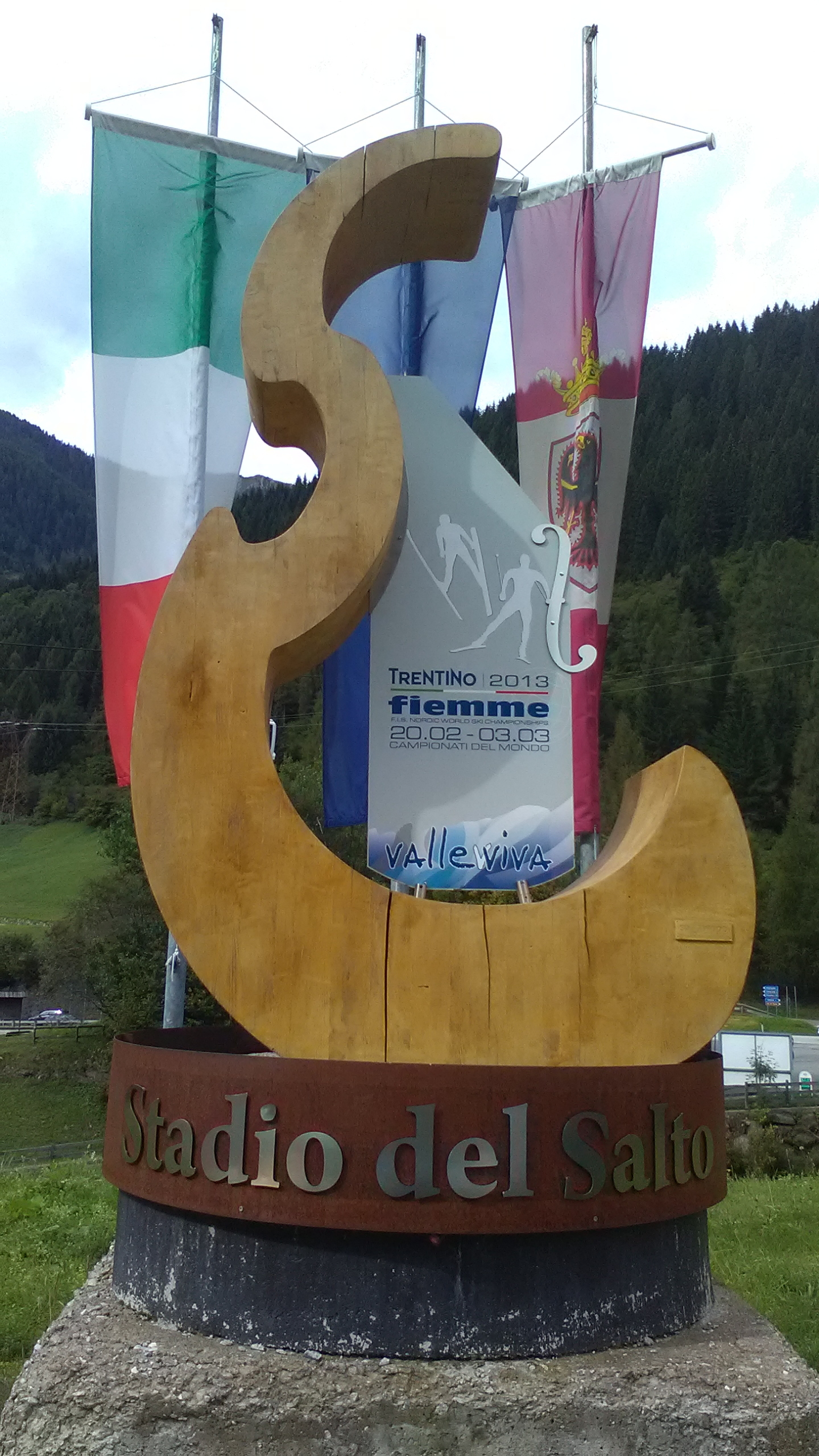
Monument in memory of the 2013 Nordic World Ski Championships

- Winter Olympics: 2026
- Nordic World Ski Championships: 1991, 2003, 2013
- Winter Universiade: 2013
- Ski Jumping World Cup: 1990, 1992, 1993, 1994, 1996, 1998, 1999, 2000, 2002, 2008, 2012, 2019, 2020
- Nordic Combined World Cup: 1995, 1996, 1997, 1999, 2000, 2001, 2002, 2004, 2006, 2007, 2008, 2009, 2010, 2012, 2014, 2015, 2016, 2017, 2018, 2019, 2020
- Italian Nordic Ski Championships: 2008

== Records ==
=== Large hill ===
#	Day	Year	Athlete	Result	Event
1	10 February	1991	(Socialist Federal Republic of Yugoslavia) Franci Petek	125.0 m	FIS Nordic World Ski Championships 1991
2	21 December	2001	(Poland) Adam Małysz	131.0 m	2001–02 FIS Ski Jumping World Cup
3	21 December	2001	(Switzerland) Simon Ammann	131.0 m	2001–02 FIS Ski Jumping World Cup
4	22 December	2001	(Switzerland) Simon Ammann	131.5 m	2001–02 FIS Ski Jumping World Cup
5	22 December	2001	(Poland) Adam Małysz	132.0 m	2001–02 FIS Ski Jumping World Cup
6	22 December	2001	(Poland) Adam Małysz	132.5 m	2001–02 FIS Ski Jumping World Cup
7	22 February	2003	(Finland) Matti Hautamäki	134.0 m	FIS Nordic World Ski Championships 2003
8	22 February	2003	(Poland) Adam Małysz	136.0 m	FIS Nordic World Ski Championships 2003
9	9 January	2009	(Austria) Bernhard Gruber	137.5 m	2008–09 FIS Nordic Combined World Cup
10	22 February	2013	(Germany) Eric Frenzel	138.5 m	FIS Nordic World Ski Championships 2013

=== Normal hill ===
#	Day	Year	Athlete	Result	Event	Notes
1	16 February	1991	(Austria) Heinz Kuttin	95.0 m	FIS Nordic World Ski Championships 1991	longest jump before the new rules
2	23 February	2003	(Poland) Adam Małysz	107.5 m	FIS Nordic World Ski Championships 2003	
3	17 August	2005	(Austria) Mario Innauer	108.0 m	FIS Cup	set in summer, not official
4	18 September	2005	(Austria) Mario Innauer	109.5 m	FIS Cup	set in summer, not official
5	15 January	2012	(United States) Sarah Hendrickson	108.0 m	2011–12 FIS Ski Jumping World Cup	woman world record
6	21 February	2013	(Austria) Christoph Bieler	109.5 m	2012–13 FIS Nordic Combined World Cup	

== See also ==
- Lago di Tesero Cross Country Stadium
- Predazzo
- Latemar
