= Chaux-Neuve =

- Commune
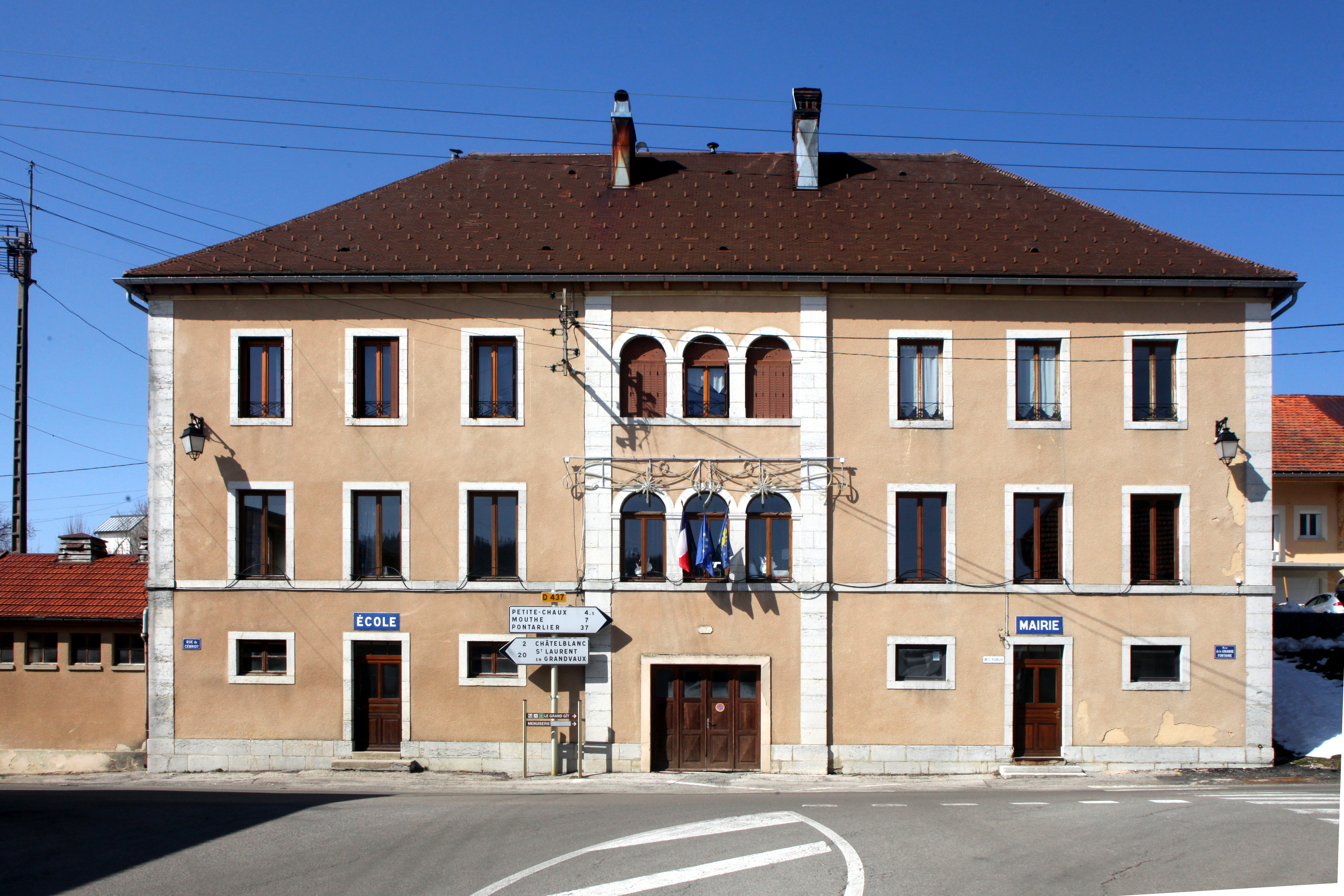
- The town hall in Chaux-Neuve
- Location of Chaux-Neuve
- Location within France Location within Bourgogne-Franche-Comté
- Coordinates: 46°40′44″N 6°08′10″E
- Country: France
- Region: Bourgogne-Franche-Comté
- Department: Doubs
- Arrondissement: Pontarlier
- Canton: Frasne

Government
  - Mayor (2020–2026): Dominique Bonnet
- Area^{1}: 28.31 km^{2} (10.93 sq mi)
- Highest elevation: 1,384 m (4,541 ft)
- Lowest elevation: 980 m (3,220 ft)
- Population (2023): 338
  - Density: 11.9/km^{2} (30.9/sq mi)
- Time zone: UTC+01:00 (CET)
  - Summer (DST): UTC+02:00 (CEST)
- INSEE/Postal code: 25142 /25240
- ^{1} French Land Register data, which excludes lakes, ponds, glaciers > 1 km^{2} (0.386 sq mi or 247 acres) and river estuaries.

Chaux-Neuve (French pronunciation: [ʃo nœv]; Arpitan: Tsâ-Neuva) is a commune in the Doubs department in the Bourgogne-Franche-Comté region in eastern France.

== Population ==
Historical population
Year	Pop.	±% p.a.
1968	252	—
1975	202	−3.11%
1982	180	−1.63%
1990	191	+0.74%
1999	223	+1.74%
2007	257	+1.79%
2012	284	+2.02%
2017	318	+2.29%
2023	338	+1.02%
Source: INSEE

== See also ==
- Communes of the Doubs department
