= Salpausselkä (ski jump) =

Ski jumping venue in Lahti, Finland

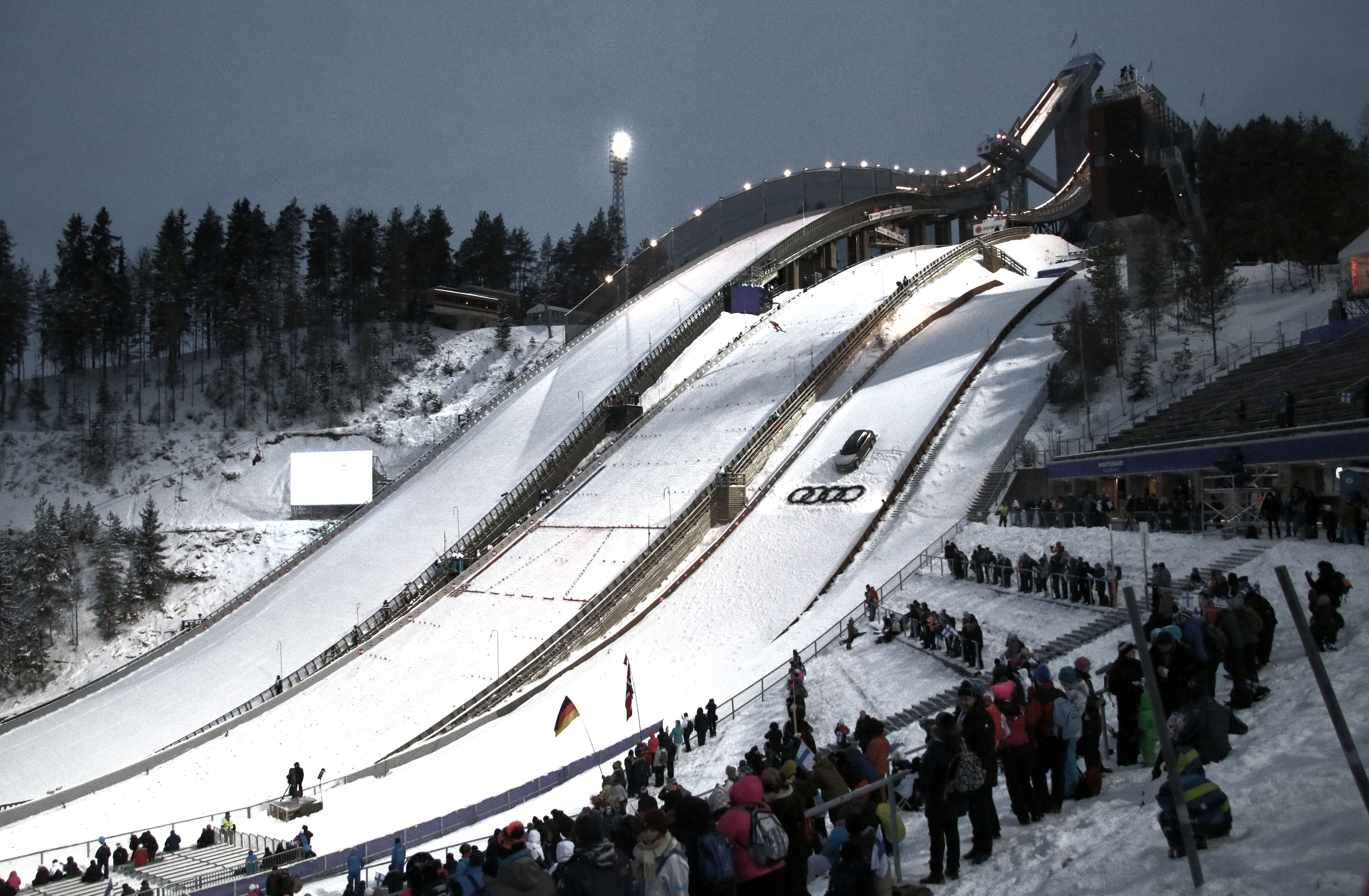
- The ski jumping hills
- Location: Lahti; Finland
- Coordinates: 60°59′00″N 025°37′46″E
- Operator: Lahden Hiihtoseura
- Opened: 1977

Size
- K–point: K-90; K-116
- Hill size: HS97; HS130
- Hill record: (Poland) Kamil Stoch (103,5 m in 2017) (Norway) Johann André Forfang (138 m in 2017)
- Spectator capacity: 60,000

Top events
- World Championships: 1978, 1989, 2001, 2017, (2029)

Salpausselkä is a ski jumping venue in Lahti, Finland. It forms part of a larger sports complex, which also includes the Lahti Ski Museum. The hills are K116, K90, K64, K38, K25, K15, K8 and K6.

== Gallery ==
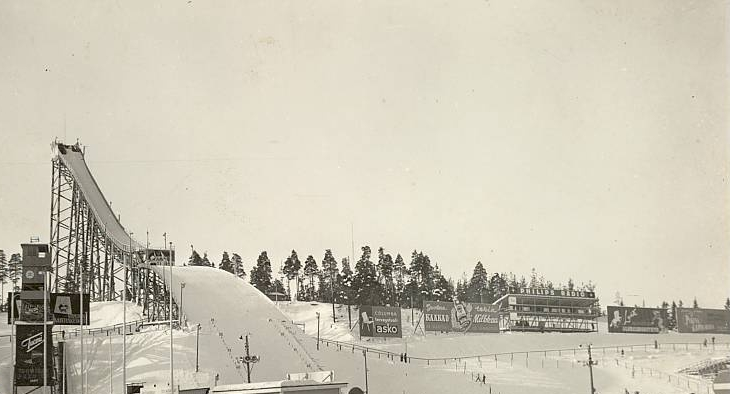
Salpausselkä old ski jumping hill (1958)

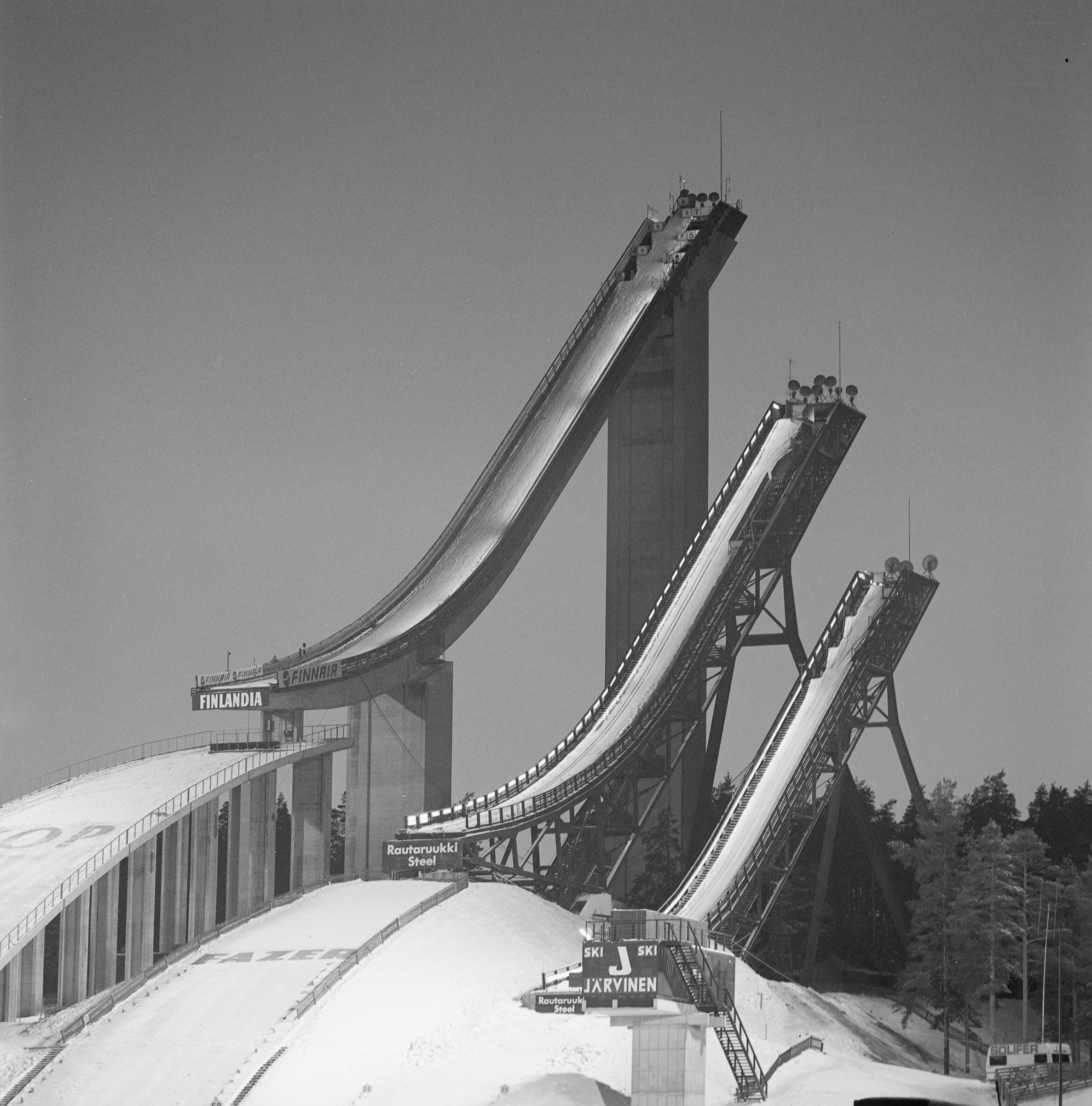
Salpausselkä ski jumping hill (1985)

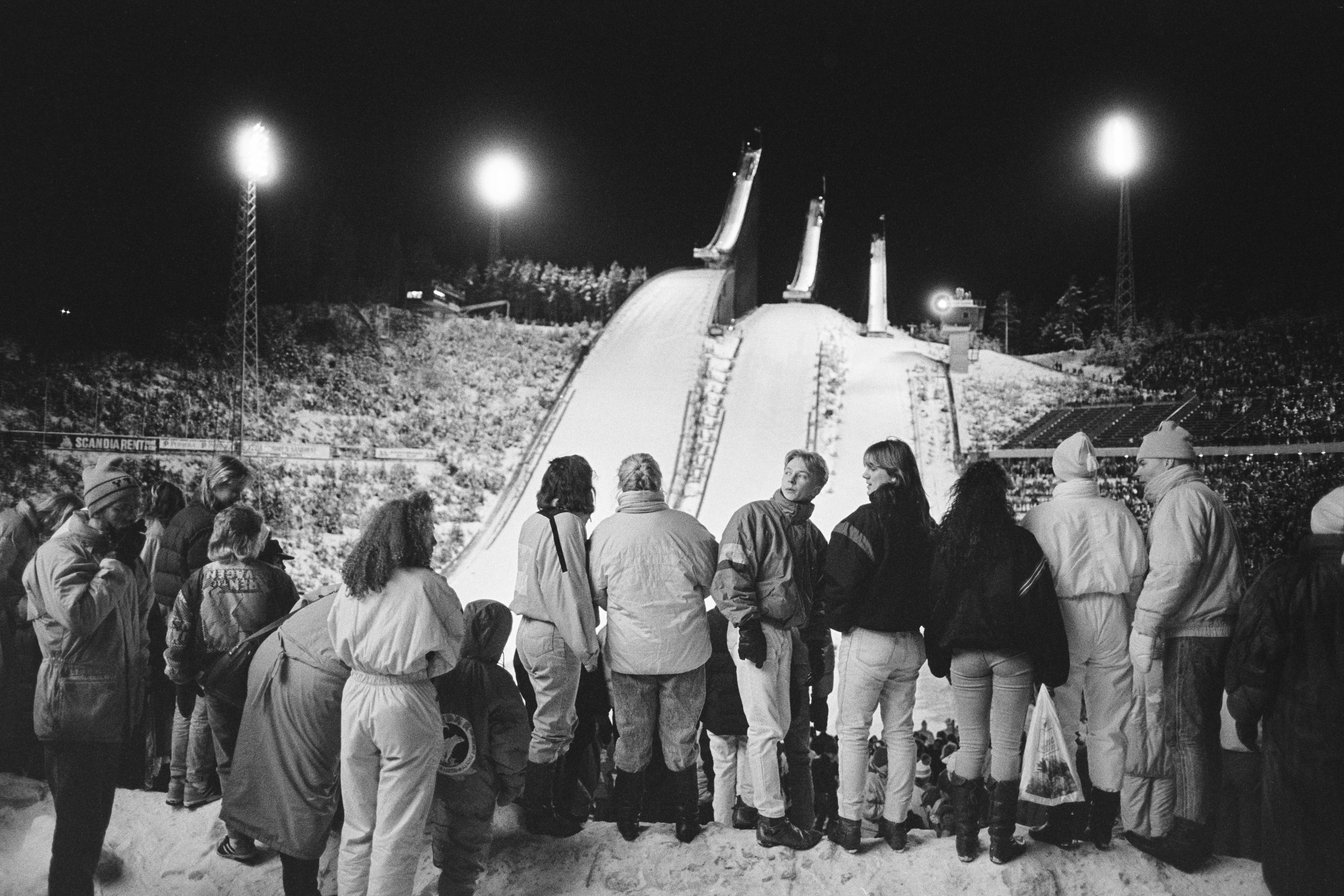
Salpausselkä competitions (1990)

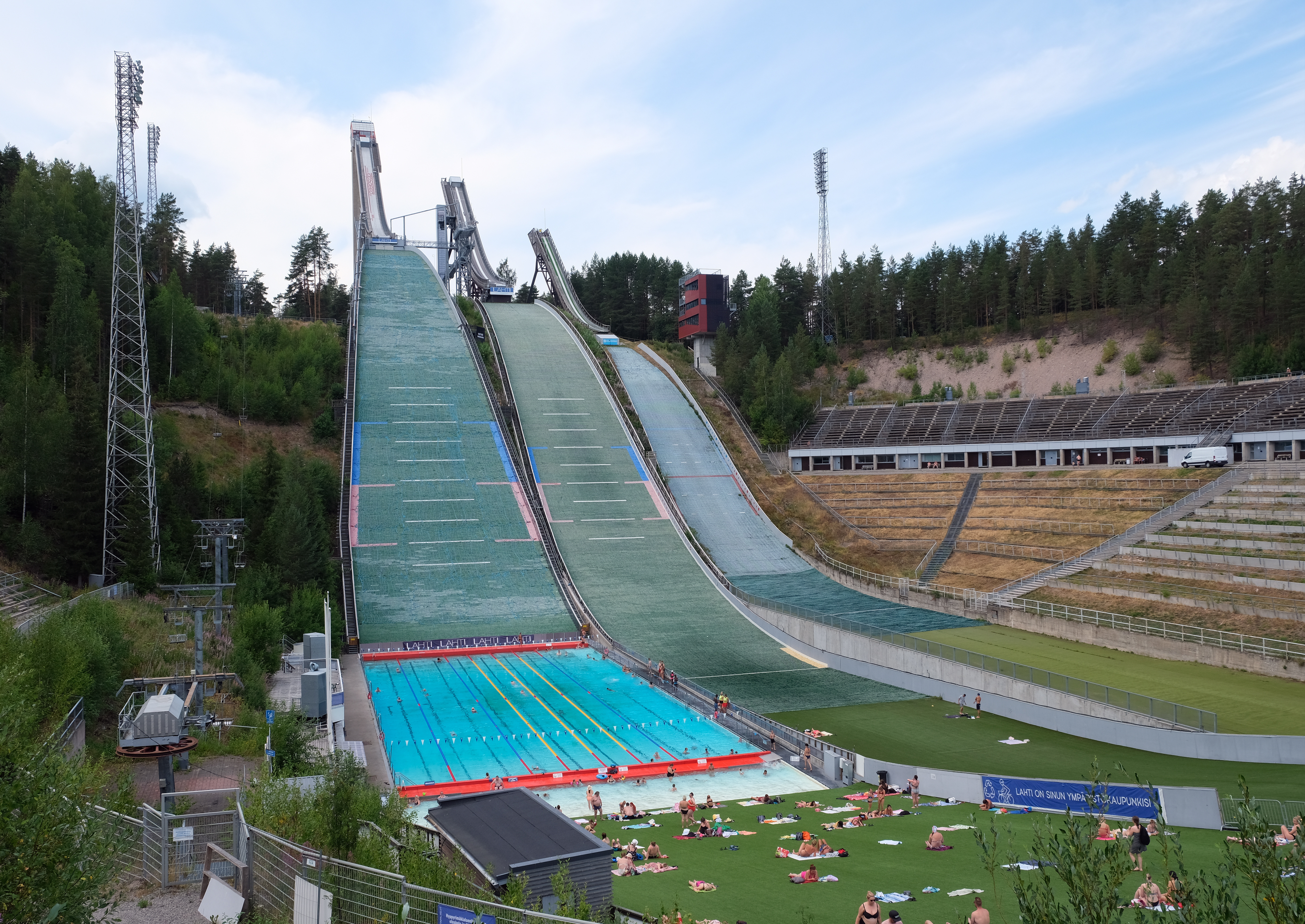
The ski jumps in summer, the outlet area of the large ski slope is used as a swimming pool (2021)

== See also ==
- Lahti Stadium
