= Toni-Seelos-Olympiaschanze =

Ski jumping hill in Austria

Coordinates: 47°19′15″N 11°10′39″E

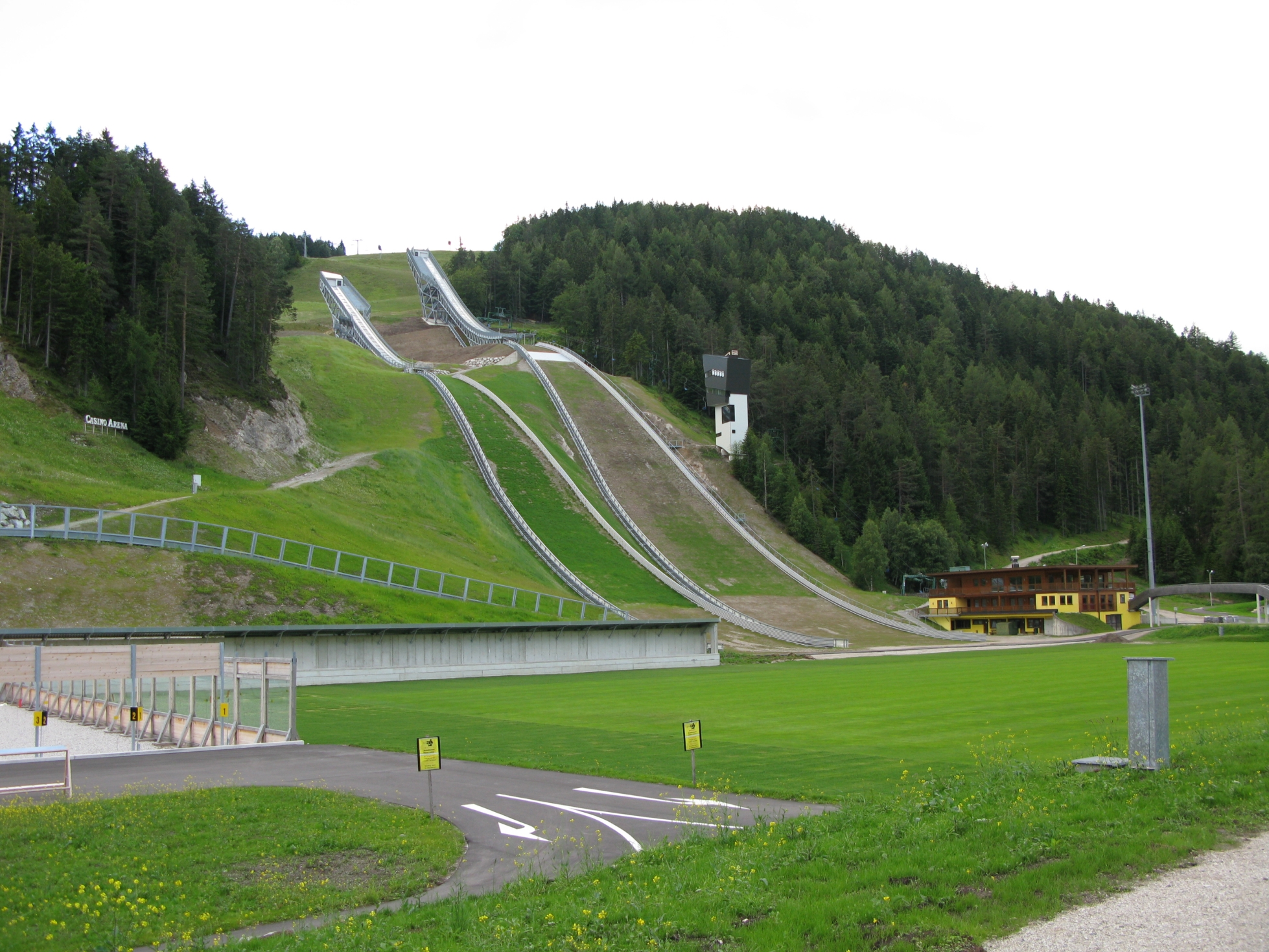
- Location: Seefeld; Austria
- Opened: 1931
- Renovated: 2003, 2010

Size
- K–point: K-99
- Hill size: HS109
- Hill record: (Slovenia) Marjan Jelenko (114.5 m in 2010)

Top events
- Olympics: 1964, 1976
- World Championships: 1985, 2019

Toni-Seelos-Olympiaschanze is a ski jumping hill in Seefeld outside of Innsbruck, Austria. It is a part of the Seefeld Nordic Competence Centre consisting of two hills, a normal hill with a hill size of HS109 (K-99) and medium hill with at HS75 (K-68). Next to the jumps is a cross-country skiing stadium. It opened in 1931 as Jahnschanze, but was renamed in honor of Anton Seelos in 1948.

The venue was used for the normal hill competitions during the 1964 and 1976 Winter Olympics, and for the FIS Nordic World Ski Championships in 1985 and 2019. It is also regularly used for FIS Nordic Combined World Cup.
