= Rukatunturi ski jumping hill =

Ski jumping venue in Kuusamo, Finland

Rukatunturi
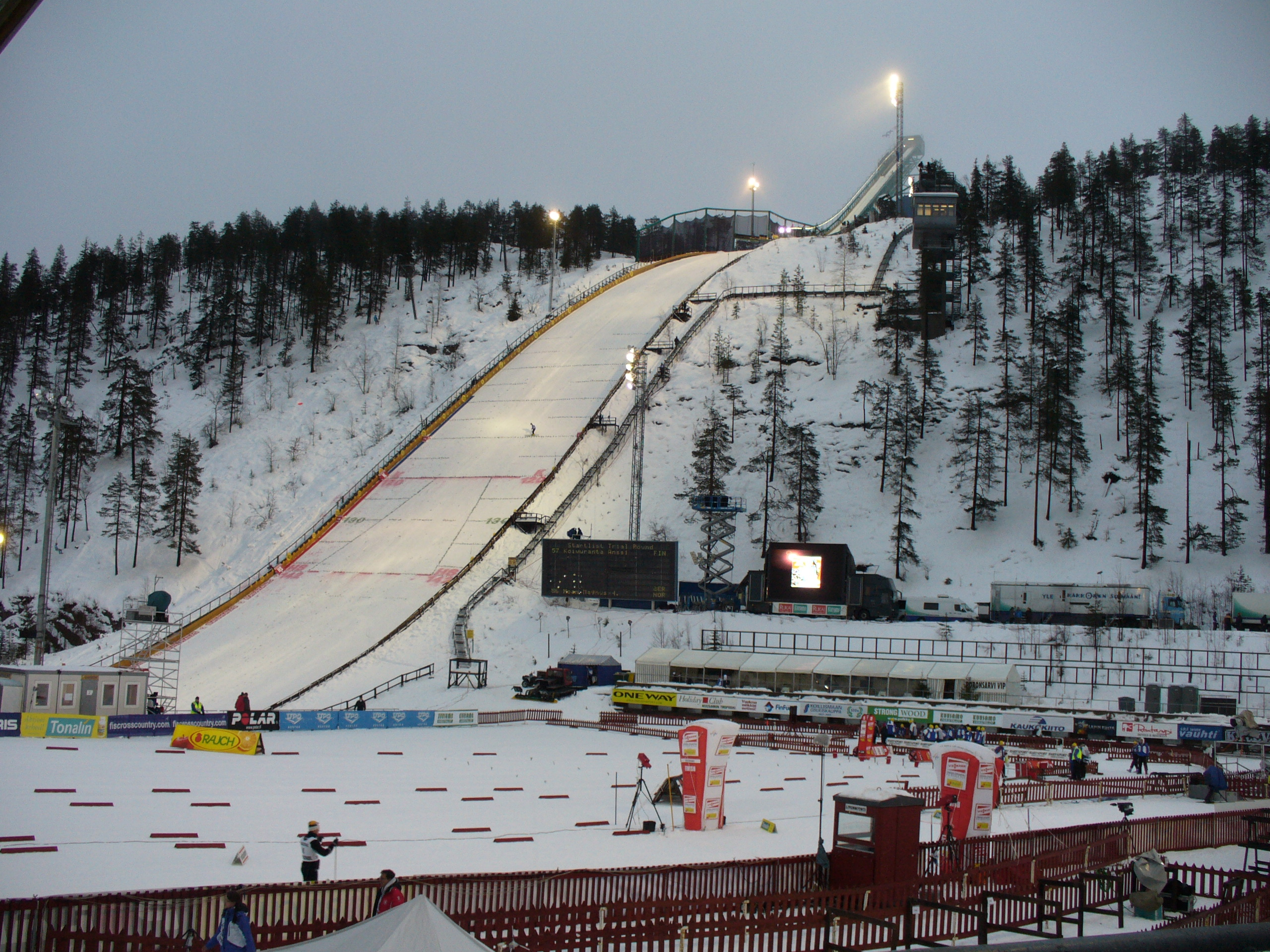
- Location: Kuusamo, Finland
- Coordinates: 66°10′16″N 29°08′40″E
- Opened: 1964
- Renovated: 1983, 1986, 1996, 2016

Size
- K–point: K-120
- Hill size: HS142
- Hill record: 150.5 m (494 ft) (Norway) Halvor Egner Granerud (27 November 2022)

The Rukatunturi ski jumping hill is a complex of Finnish ski jumping hills located in Ruka – a town located north of Kuusamo – and is the largest ski jumping hill in Finland. It regularly hosts the opening events of the ski jumping World Cup and Nordic combined World Cup. It includes the K120 large hill and smaller facilities K64.

Since the 2002–2003 season, Ruka has regularly hosted World Cup competitions, and sometimes also hosts the Continental Cup.

Before the 2016–2017 season, ice tracks were installed on the hill. The large hill and two smaller hills have a plastic matting. The official record is 150.5 metres, jumped by Halvor Egner Granerud, in the Ski Jumping competition in 2022.

== Hill parameters ==
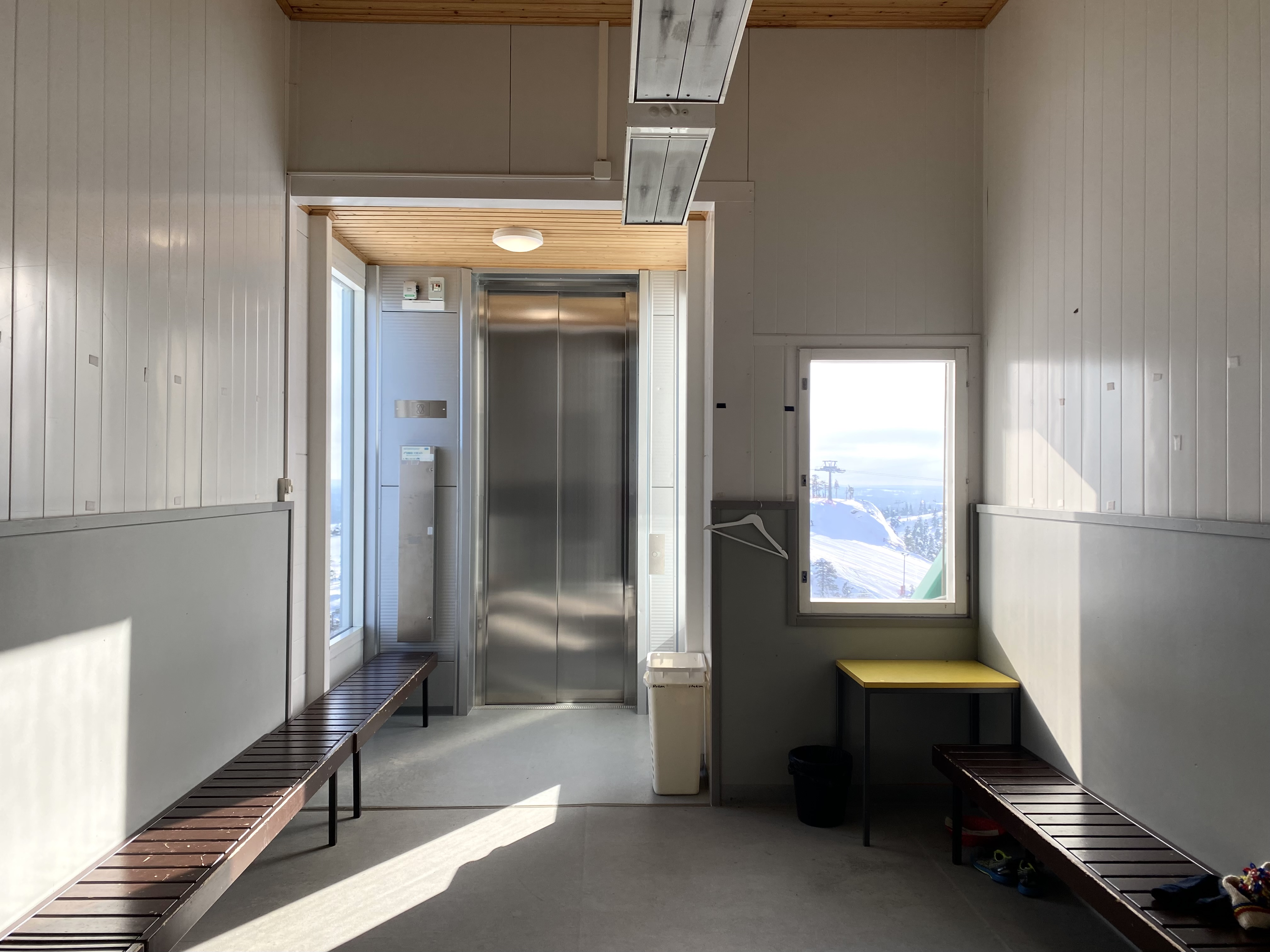
Athletes’ waiting room.

- Construction point: 120 m
- Hill size (HS): 142 m
- Official hill record: 150.5 m – (Norway) Halvor Egner Granerud (27 November 2022)
- Hill record: 153.5 m – (Norway) Jarl Magnus Riiber (26 November 2023)
- Inrun length: 100.5 m
- Inrun angle: 35°
- Take-off length: 6.75 m
- Take-off angle: 11.3°
- Take-off height: 3.5 m
- Landing angle: 36.9°
- Average speed: 94.7 km/h

The facility is equipped with plastic mattings and has got a porcelain trail in the inrun, a ski lift, an elevator, a heated waiting room and artificial lighting.
