= W90-Mattensprunganlage =

Ski jumping venue in Austria

Coordinates: 47.4175°N 13.6553°E

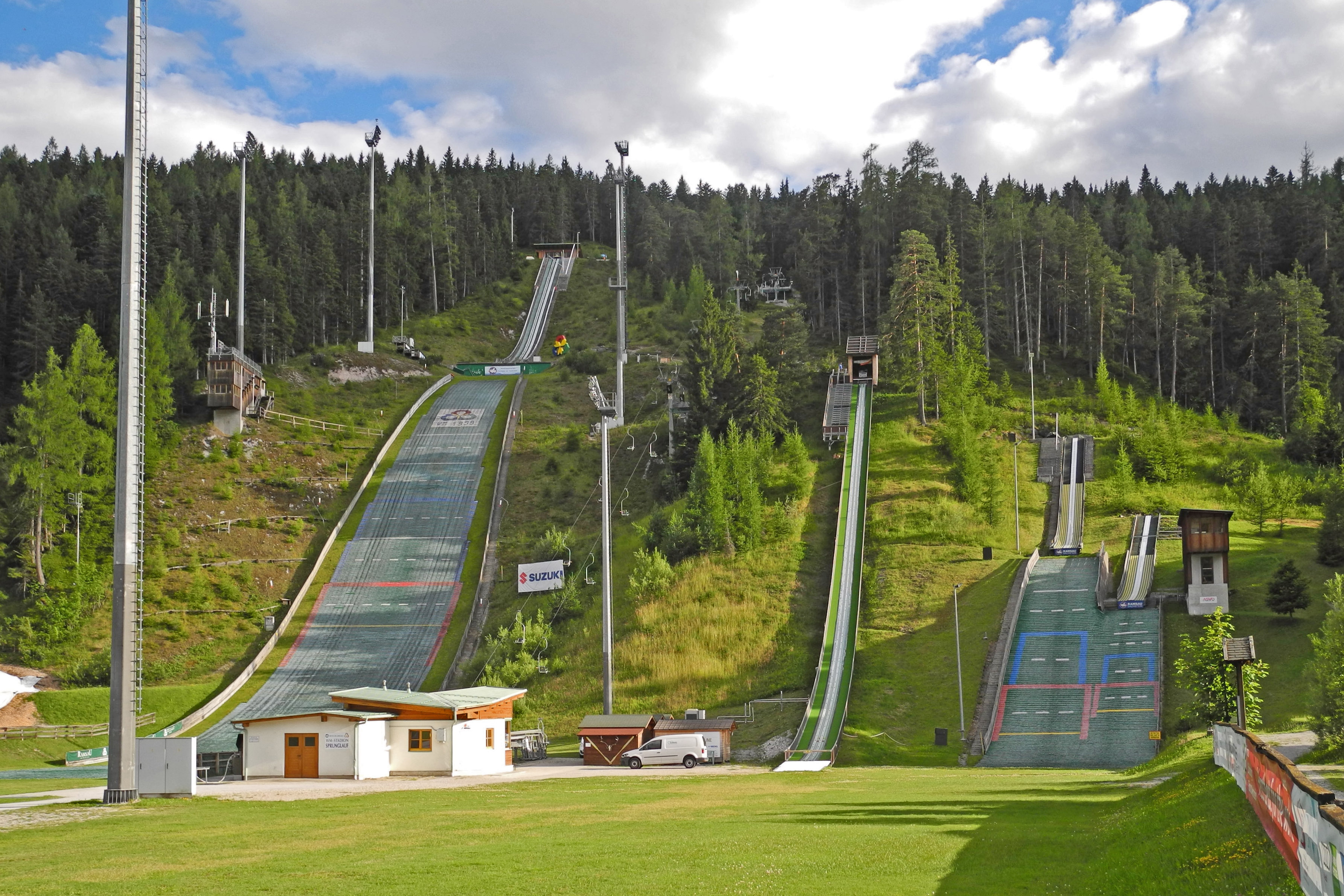
- Location: Ramsau am Dachstein; Austria
- Opened: 1995

Size
- K–point: K-90
- Hill size: HS 98
- Hill record: 101 m (331 ft) (Japan) Daito Takahashi (17 December 2005)

W90-Mattensprunganlage is a ski jumping normal hill in Ramsau am Dachstein, Austria.

== History ==
It was opened in 1995 and owned by WSV Ramsau. It has hosted one FIS Ski jumping World Cup event each for men and women, in 1998 and 2012 respectively, as well as events at the FIS Nordic World Ski Championships 1999. Daito Takahashi holds the hill record.

== World Cup ==
=== Gentlemen ===
Date	Hillsize	Winner	Second	Third
11 January 1998	K90	(Japan) Masahiko Harada	(Japan) Kazuyoshi Funaki	(Japan) Hiroya Saito

=== Ladies ===
Date	Hillsize	Winner	Second	Third
14 December 2012	HS98	(Japan) Sara Takanashi	(France) Coline Mattel	(Austria) Daniela Iraschko
