= Langenwaldschanze =

Ski jump in Schonach im Schwarzwald, Germany

Coordinates: 48.1354°N 8.2023°E

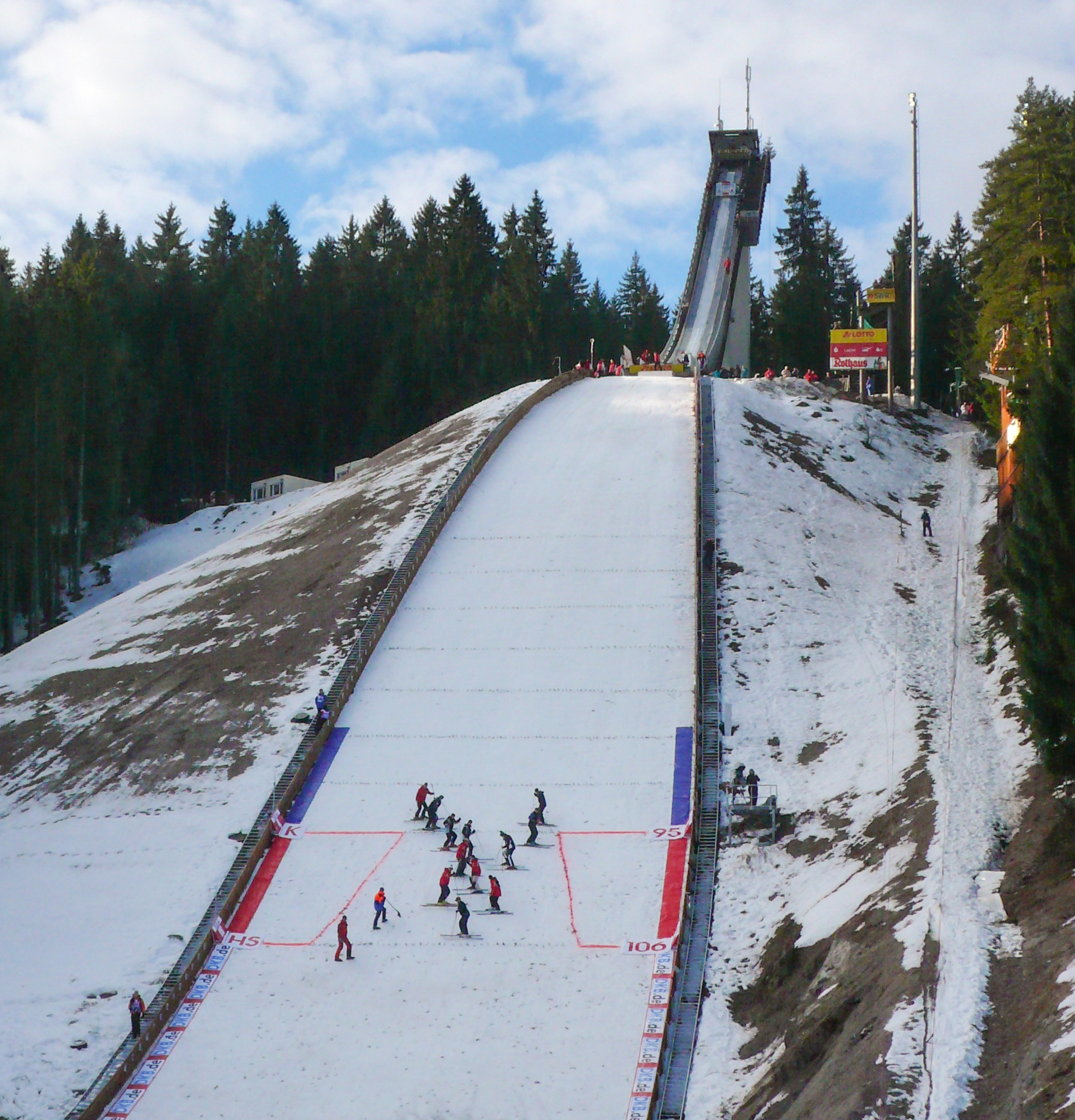
- Location: Schonach im Schwarzwald; Germany
- Opened: 1924
- Renovated: 1934, 1937, 1955, 1963, 1967, 1972, 1979, 2001
- Expanded: 2010

Size
- K–point: K-95
- Hill size: HS 106
- Hill record: 111 m (Japan) Ryōta Yamamoto (13 March 2022)

Langenwaldschanze is a ski jumping normal hill in Schonach im Schwarzwald, Germany.

== History ==
It was opened in 1924 and owned by SC Schonach. It hosted two FIS Ski jumping World Cup events for ladies. Ryota Yamamoto holds the hill record with 111 m.

== See also ==
- Schwarzwaldpokal
