= United States Nordic Combined Championships =

The United States Nordic Combined Championships is a Nordic Combined competition held annually since 1932 to crown the national champions of the United States. The Paul Nash Layman, Jr. award is presented to each champion since 1941. The Harry Wade Hicks award is presented for the highest point scorer in the combined regardless of class. The original award trophies were donated by Mr. David T. Layman, Jr. of New York City in 1939.

== Medalists ==
U.S. Nordic Combined National Championships
Year	Site	Champion	Second	Third	Notes
1932	Tahoe City, CA	Hjalmar Hvam			
1933	Salisbury, CT	Karl Magnus Satre			
1934-1936	not held				
1937	Minneapolis, MN	Warren Chivers			
1938	Minneapolis, MN	David J. Bradley			
1939	Salt Lake City, UT	Alf Engen			
1940	Land O' Lakes, WI	Peter Fosseide			
1941	Salt Lake City, UT	Alf Engen			
1942	Brattleboro, VT	Howard Chivers			
1943-1946	not held				
1947	Lake Placid, NY	Ralph Townsend			
1948	Duluth, MN	Robert Wright			
1949	Hyak, WA	Ralph Townsend, Gordon Wren			
1950	Berlin, NH	Robert Arsenault			
1951	Berlin, NH	Theodore A. Farwell			
1952	McCall, ID	Corey Engen			
1953	not held				
1954	Ishpeming, MI	Norman Oakvik			
1955	not held				
1956	Ishpeming, MI	Per Staavi			
1957		Bill Purcell			
1958	Rumford, ME	Alfred Vincelette, Frank Noel			
1959	Steamboat Springs, CO	Alfred Vincelette, John Mattson, Norman Oakvik			
1960	Steamboat Springs, CO	Alfred Vincelette			
1961-1962	not held				
1963	Franconia, NH	John Bower			
1964	Crested Butte, CO	Jim Balfanz			
1965	Andover, ME	David Rikert			
1966	Brattleboro, VT	John Bower			
1967	Putney, VT	John Bower			
1968	Steamboat Springs, CO	John Bower			
1969	Durango, CO	Jim Miller			
1970	Putney, VT & Eau Claire, WI	Jim Miller			
1971	Williamstown, MA	Bob Kendall			
1972	Brattleboro & Putney, VT	Mike Devecka			
1973	Minneapolis, MN	Teyck Weed			
1974	Laconia, NH	Bruce Cunningham			
1975	Laconia, NH	Mike Devecka			
1976	Brattleboro, VT	Jim Galanes			
1977	Ishpeming, MI	Jim Galanes			
1978	Winter Park, CO	Jim Galanes			
1979	Steamboat Springs, CO	Mike Devecka			
1980	Eau Claire, WI	Walter Malmquist			
1981	Laconia, NH	Kerry Lynch			
1982	Laconia, NH	Pat Ahern			
1983	Eau Claire, WI	Kerry Lynch			
1984	Lake Placid, NY	Pat Ahern			
1985	Laconia, NH	Pat Ahern			
1986	Steamboat Springs, CO	Kerry Lynch			
1987	Ishpeming, MI	Pat Ahern			
1988	Lake Placid, NY	Joe Holland			
1989	Lake Placid, NY	Joe Holland			
1990	Steamboat Springs, CO	Dan O'Meara			
1991	Steamboat Springs, CO	Joe Holland			
1992	Lake Placid, NY	Tim Tetreault			
1993	Steamboat Springs, CO	Tim Tetreault			
1994	Steamboat Springs, CO	Todd Lodwick			
1995	Steamboat Springs, CO	Ryan Heckman			
1996	Steamboat Springs, CO	Todd Lodwick			
1997	Steamboat Springs, CO	Todd Lodwick			
1998	Steamboat Springs, CO	Todd Lodwick			
1999	Lake Placid, NY	Todd Lodwick			
2000	Steamboat Springs, CO	Todd Lodwick			
2001	Park City, UT	Bill Demong			
2002	Steamboat Springs, CO	Bill Demong			
2003	Steamboat Springs, CO	Todd Lodwick			
2004	Steamboat Springs, CO	Todd Lodwick			
2005	Steamboat Springs, CO	Todd Lodwick			
2006	Steamboat Springs, CO	Todd Lodwick			
2007	Steamboat Springs, CO	Bill Demong			
2008	Park City, UT	Bill Demong			
2009	Lake Placid, NY	Johnny Spillane	Bill Demong	Todd Lodwick	
2010	Lake Placid, NY	Todd Lodwick	Brett Camerota	Bryan Fletcher	
2011	Park City, UT	Brett Camerota	Todd Lodwick	Bill Demong	
2012	Fox River Grove, IL	Bill Demong	Johnny Spillane	Bryan Fletcher	
2013	Park City, UT	Todd Lodwick	Johnny Spillane	Taylor Fletcher	
2014	Lake Placid, NY	Bill Demong	Taylor Fletcher	Bryan Fletcher	
2014–2015	Lake Placid, NY	Bryan Fletcher	Taylor Fletcher	Adam Loomis	
2014–2015	Lake Placid, NY	Tara Geraghty-Moats	Gabby Armstrong		
2015–2016	Park City, UT	Bryan Fletcher	Adam Loomis	Taylor Fletcher	
2016–2017	Park City, UT	Taylor Fletcher	Bryan Fletcher	Ben Berend	
2017–2018	Lake Placid, NY	Bryan Fletcher	Ben Loomis	Jasper Good	
2017–2018	Lake Placid, NY	Nina Lussi	Nita Englund	Abby Ringquist	
2018–2019	Park City, UT	Taylor Fletcher	Grant Andrews	Stephen Schumann	
2018–2019	Park City, UT	Annika Malacinski	Tess Arnone		
2020–2021	Lake Placid, NY	Taylor Fletcher			
2020–2021	Lake Placid, NY	Annika Belshaw			
2021–2022	Lake Placid, NY	Jared Shumate	Jasper Good	Stephen Schumann	
2021–2022	Lake Placid, NY	Annika Malacinski	Alexa Brabec	Kai McKinnon	
2022–2023	Lake Placid, NY	Ben Loomis	Niklas Malacinski	Stephen Schumann	
2022–2023	Lake Placid, NY	Annika Malacinski	Alexa Brabec		
2023–2024	Lake Placid, NY	Niklas Malacinski			
2023–2024	Lake Placid, NY	Alexa Brabec			

== See also ==
- U.S. National Ski Jumping Championships
