= 2017–18 FIS Nordic Combined Continental Cup =

Nordic Combined Continental Cup 2017/18
Discipline	Men	Women
Overall	(Austria) Thomas Jöbstl	(Russia) Stefaniya Nadymova
Nations Cup	Austria	Russia

Competition
Locations	7	3
Individual	18	6
Cancelled	—	2

The 2017/18 FIS Nordic Combined Continental Cup was the Continental Cup season, organized by the International Ski Federation for men and for ladies. It started on 15 December 2017 in Steamboat Springs, United States of America and concluded on 11 March 2018 in Nizhny Tagil, Russia.

== Calendar ==
=== Men ===
Num	Season	Date	Place	Hill	Discipline	Winner	Second	Third	Yellow bib	Ref.
1	1	15 December 2017	(United States) Steamboat Springs	Howelsen Hill	HS75 / 10 km	(Norway) Mikko Kokslien	(Norway) Truls Soenstehagen Johansen	(France) Hugo Buffard	(Norway) Mikko Kokslien	
2	2	16 December 2017	(United States) Steamboat Springs	Howelsen Hill	HS75 / 10 km	(Norway) Mikko Kokslien	(France) Hugo Buffard	(Norway) Truls Soenstehagen Johansen	(Norway) Mikko Kokslien	
3	3	17 December 2017	(United States) Steamboat Springs	Howelsen Hill	HS75 / 10 km	(Norway) Mikko Kokslien	(Norway) Truls Soenstehagen Johansen	(France) Hugo Buffard	(Norway) Mikko Kokslien	
4	4	5 January 2018	(Germany) Klingenthal	Vogtlandarena	HS140 / 5 km	(Norway) Sindre Ure Søtvik	(Norway) Harald Johnas Riiber	(Estonia) Kristjan Ilves	(Norway) Mikko Kokslien	
5	5	6 January 2018	(Germany) Klingenthal	Vogtlandarena	HS140 / 10 km	(Austria) Franz-Josef Rehrl	(France) Maxime Laheurte	(Poland) Paweł Słowiok	(Norway) Mikko Kokslien	
6	6	7 January 2018	(Germany) Klingenthal	Vogtlandarena	HS140 / 10 km	(France) François Braud	(France) Antoine Gérard	(Poland) Paweł Słowiok	(Norway) Mikko Kokslien	
7	7	12 January 2018	(Finland) Ruka	Rukatunturi	HS142 / 10 km	(Austria) Bernhard Flaschberger	(Japan) Hidefumi Denda	(Austria) Thomas Jöbstl	(Norway) Mikko Kokslien	
8	8	13 January 2018	(Finland) Ruka	Rukatunturi	HS140 / 10 km	(Norway) Sindre Ure Søtvik	(Austria) Martin Fritz	(Germany) Luis Lehnert	(Norway) Sindre Ure Søtvik	
9	9	14 January 2018	(Finland) Ruka	Rukatunturi	HS140 / 10 km	(Austria) Thomas Jöbstl	(Austria) Martin Fritz	(Norway) Harald Johnas Riiber	(Norway) Sindre Ure Søtvik	
10	10	20 January 2018	(Norway) Rena	Renabakkene	HS111 / 10 km	(Austria) Thomas Jöbstl	(Austria) Bernhard Flaschberger	(Norway) Jens Lurås Oftebro	(Norway) Sindre Ure Søtvik	
11	11	21 January 2018	(Norway) Rena	Renabakkene	HS111 / 10 km	(Austria) Dominik Terzer	(Austria) Martin Fritz	(United States) Taylor Fletcher	(Austria) Thomas Jöbstl	
12	12	3 February 2018	(Slovenia) Planica	Bloudkova velikanka	HS139 / 10 km	(United States) Bryan Fletcher	(United States) Taylor Fletcher	(Austria) Martin Fritz	(Austria) Thomas Jöbstl	
13	13	4 February 2018	(Slovenia) Planica	Bloudkova velikanka	HS139 / 10 km	(United States) Bryan Fletcher	(Austria) Martin Fritz	(United States) Taylor Fletcher	(Austria) Martin Fritz	
14	14	10 February 2018	(Austria) Eisenerz	Erzberg Arena	HS109 / 10 km	(Austria) Mika Vermeulen	(Norway) Mikko Kokslien	(Norway) Espen Bjørnstad	(Austria) Thomas Jöbstl	
15	15	11 February 2018	(Austria) Eisenerz	Erzberg Arena	HS109 / 10 km	(Norway) Mikko Kokslien	(Austria) Paul Gerstgraser	(Austria) Mika Vermeulen	(Austria) Thomas Jöbstl	
16	16	9 March 2018	(Russia) Nizhny Tagil	Tramplin Stork	HS100 / 10 km	(Italy) Lukas Runggaldier	(Japan) Aguri Shimizu	(Germany) Terence Weber	(Austria) Thomas Jöbstl	
17	17	10 March 2018	(Russia) Nizhny Tagil	Tramplin Stork	HS100 / 10 km	(Austria) Bernhard Flaschberger	(Russia) Ernest Yahin	(Austria) Paul Gerstgraser	(Austria) Thomas Jöbstl	
18	18	11 March 2018	(Russia) Nizhny Tagil	Tramplin Stork	HS100 / 15 km	(France) Laurent Muhlethaler	(Germany) Tobias Simon	(Italy) Lukas Runggaldier	(Austria) Thomas Jöbstl	

=== Ladies ===
Num	Season	Date	Place	Hill	Discipline	Winner	Second	Third	Yellow bib	Ref.
1	1	6 January 2018	(Estonia) Otepää	Tehvandi	HS100 / 5 km	lack of snow and warm temperatures; not rescheduled				
2	2	7 January 2018	(Estonia) Otepää	Tehvandi	HS100 / 5 km	lack of snow and warm temperatures; not rescheduled				
3	3	20 January 2018	(Norway) Rena	Renabakkene	HS111 / 5 km	(Russia) Stefaniya Nadymova	(Japan) Ayane Miyazaki	(Germany) Jenny Nowak	(Russia) Stefaniya Nadymova	
4	4	21 January 2018	(Norway) Rena	Renabakkene	HS111 / 5 km	(Japan) Ayane Miyazaki	(Russia) Stefaniya Nadymova	(Germany) Jenny Nowak	(Russia) Stefaniya Nadymova (Japan) Ayane Miyazaki	
5	5	10 March 2018	(Russia) Nizhny Tagil	Tramplin Stork	HS100 / 5 km	(Russia) Stefaniya Nadymova	(Japan) Ayane Miyazaki	(Russia) Anastasia Goncharova	(Russia) Stefaniya Nadymova	
6	6	11 March 2018	(Russia) Nizhny Tagil	Tramplin Stork	HS100 / 5 km	(Russia) Stefaniya Nadymova	(Germany) Jenny Nowak	(Japan) Ayane Miyazaki	(Russia) Stefaniya Nadymova	

== Standings ==
=== Men's overall ===
Rank	after all 18 events	Points
1	(Austria) Thomas Jöbstl	577
2	(Austria) Martin Fritz	520
3	(Norway) Sindre Ure Søtvik	516
4	(Norway) Mikko Kokslien	480
5	(Germany) Tobias Simon	479
6	(Austria) Bernhard Flaschberger	467
7	(Norway) Harald Johnas Riiber	447
8	(France) Hugo Buffard	427
9	(Italy) Lukas Runggaldier	381
10	(Austria) Paul Gerstgraser	373

=== Ladies overall ===
Rank	after all 4 events	Points
1	(Russia) Stefaniya Nadymova	380
2	(Japan) Ayane Miyazaki	320
3	(Germany) Jenny Nowak	250
4	(Italy) Veronica Gianmoena	190
5	(Germany) Sophia Maurus	156
6	(Japan) Yura Murakami	126
7	(Russia) Anastasia Goncharova	105
8	(Russia) Svetlana Gladikova	88
9	(Norway) Gyda Westvold Hansen	81
10	(Czech Republic) Simona Weinlichova	64

=== Men's Nations Cup ===
Rank	after all 18 events	Points
1	Austria	3038
2	Norway	2754
3	Germany	1751
4	France	1224
5	Japan	1188
6	United States	1010
7	Italy	634
8	Russia	365
9	Czech Republic	216
10	Poland	211

=== Ladies Nations Cup ===
Rank	after all 4 events	Points
1	Russia	775
2	Japan	446
3	Germany	406
4	Norway	227
5	Italy	190
6	Czech Republic	64
7	United States	46
8	Kazakhstan	40
