= United States Nordic Combined Championships 2011 =

Annual winter sport event

U.S. National Championship
- 2011

Tournament information
- Sport: Nordic combined
- Location: Park City, Utah
- Date: August 1, 2010
- Established: 1932
- Administrator: USSA

Final positions
- Champion: Brett Camerota
- 1st runner-up: Todd Lodwick
- 2nd runner-up: Bill Demong

The United States Nordic Combined Championships 2011 took place on August 1, 2010 in Park City, Utah. Brett Camerota won the race.

== Results ==
Rank	Athlete
1	Brett Camerota
2	Todd Lodwick
3	Bill Demong
4	Eric Camerota
5	Bryan Fletcher
