= FIS Nordic World Ski Championships 2017 – Team normal hill/4 × 5 km =

Team normal hill/4 × 5 km at the FIS Nordic World Ski Championships 2017
- Venue: Salpausselkä
- Location: Lahti, Finland
- Date: 26 February
- Competitors: 44 from 11 nations
- Teams: 11
- Winning time: 47:57.3

Medalists
| gold medal | Björn Kircheisen; Eric Frenzel; Fabian Rießle; Johannes Rydzek | Germany |
| silver medal | Magnus Moan; Mikko Kokslien; Magnus Krog; Jørgen Graabak | Norway |
| bronze medal | Bernhard Gruber; Mario Seidl; Philipp Orter; Paul Gerstgraser | Austria |

The Team normal hill/4 × 5 km event of the FIS Nordic World Ski Championships 2017 was held on 26 February 2017.

== Results ==
=== Ski jumping ===
The ski jumping part was started at 12:00.

| Rank | Bib | Country | Distance (m) | Points | Time difference |
|---|---|---|---|---|---|
| 1 | 11 | Germany; Björn Kircheisen; Fabian Rießle; Eric Frenzel; Johannes Rydzek | 91.0; 97.0; 100.0; 96.5 | 500.8; 114.3; 129.0; 132.0; 125.5 | |
| 2 | 8 | Japan; Hideaki Nagai; Takehiro Watanabe; Yoshito Watabe; Akito Watabe | 90.0; 91.0; 94.5; 95.0 | 468.0; 112.3; 114.2; 120.5; 121.0 | +0:44 |
| 3 | 6 | France; François Braud; Antoine Gérard; Laurent Muhlethaler; Maxime Laheurte | 93.5; 90.0; 93.5; 95.0 | 467.7; 119.5; 109.6; 117.1; 121.5 | +0:44 |
| 4 | 10 | Austria; Paul Gerstgraser; Bernhard Gruber; Philipp Orter; Mario Seidl | 87.5; 94.5; 93.0; 92.5 | 451.8; 104.0; 118.8; 114.3; 114.7 | +1:05 |
| 5 | 9 | Norway; Magnus Krog; Mikko Kokslien; Magnus Moan; Jørgen Graabak | 89.5; 89.5; 94.0; 94.0 | 450.9; 106.6; 109.1; 117.5; 117.3 | +1:07 |
| 6 | 7 | Finland; Eero Hirvonen; Hannu Manninen; Leevi Mutru; Ilkka Herola | 87.0; 83.0; 93.5; 94.5 | 436.5; 105.0; 95.2; 118.4; 117.9 | +1:26 |
| 7 | 3 | United States; Ben Berend; Ben Loomis; Taylor Fletcher; Bryan Fletcher | 96.5; 87.5; 83.5; 89.0 | 424.4; 121.4; 104.7; 95.9; 102.4 | +1:42 |
| 8 | 4 | Czech Republic; Ondřej Pažout; Jan Vytrval; Miroslav Dvořák; Tomáš Portyk | 88.5; 91.0; 90.5; 84.0 | 420.5; 102.8; 109.9; 111.3; 96.5 | +1:47 |
| 9 | 2 | Russia; Timofey Borisov; Ernest Yahin; Viacheslav Barkov; Samir Mastiev | 88.0; 92.0; 91.5; 86.0 | 418.4; 102.9; 113.3; 110.5; 91.7 | +1:50 |
| 10 | 1 | Estonia; Han-Hendrik Piho; Kail Piho; Karl-August Tiirmaa; Kristjan Ilves | 84.5; 82.5; 88.0; 96.5 | 409.1; 96.4; 91.5; 104.8; 116.4 | +2:02 |
| 11 | 5 | Italy; Armin Bauer; Lukas Runggaldier; Alessandro Pittin; Samuel Costa | 83.5; 82.0; 92.0; 88.5 | 406.3; 95.0; 89.8; 113.2; 108.3 | +2:06 |

=== Cross-country skiing ===
The cross-country skiing part was started at 15:30.

| Rank | Bib | Country | Deficit | Time | Rank | Deficit |
|---|---|---|---|---|---|---|
| 1st place, gold medalist(s) | 1 | Germany; Björn Kircheisen; Eric Frenzel; Fabian Rießle; Johannes Rydzek | 0:00 | 47:57.3; 12:04.8; 11:46.1; 11:49.4; 12:17.0 | 5 | |
| 2nd place, silver medalist(s) | 5 | Norway; Magnus Moan; Mikko Kokslien; Magnus Krog; Jørgen Graabak | 1:07 | 47:32.0; 11:50.9; 11:39.3; 11:47.2; 12:14.6 | 2 | +41.7 |
| 3rd place, bronze medalist(s) | 4 | Austria; Bernhard Gruber; Mario Seidl; Philipp Orter; Paul Gerstgraser | 1:05 | 47:56.0; 11:51.3; 12:06.6; 11:49.5; 12:08.6 | 4 | +1:03.7 |
| 4 | 2 | Japan; Hideaki Nagai; Takehiro Watanabe; Yoshito Watabe; Akito Watabe | 0:44 | 48:19.3; 12:17.3; 12:01.8; 11:56.0; 12:04.2 | 6 | +1:06.0 |
| 5 | 6 | Finland; Leevi Mutru; Eero Hirvonen; Ilkka Herola; Hannu Manninen | 1:26 | 47:49.0; 12:17.2; 11:57.2; 11:36.5; 11:58.1 | 3 | +1:17.7 |
| 6 | 11 | Italy; Armin Bauer; Lukas Runggaldier; Alessandro Pittin; Samuel Costa | 2:06 | 47:09.5; 11:56.0; 11:47.6; 11:26.9; 11:59.0 | 1 | +1:18.2 |
| 7 | 3 | France; Laurent Muhlethaler; Maxime Laheurte; François Braud; Antoine Gérard | 0:44 | 48:32.8; 12:18.5; 12:13.9; 11:59.7; 12:00.7 | 7 | +1:19.5 |
| 8 | 7 | United States; Bryan Fletcher; Taylor Fletcher; Ben Berend; Ben Loomis | 1:42 | 49:42.5; 12:00.9; 11:50.6; 13:12.2; 12:48.8 | 9 | +3:27.2 |
| 9 | 10 | Estonia; Kail Piho; Karl-August Tiirmaa; Han-Hendrik Piho; Kristjan Ilves | 2:02 | 49:35.0; 12:00.6; 12:29.1; 12:29.2; 12:36.1 | 8 | +3:39.7 |
| 10 | 9 | Russia; Samir Mastiev; Viacheslav Barkov; Ernest Yahin; Timofey Borisov | 1:50 | 50:59.3; 12:11.4; 12:16.2; 12:44.6; 13:48.1 | 10 | +4:52.0 |
| 11 | 8 | Czech Republic; Miroslav Dvořák; Tomáš Portyk; Ondřej Pažout; Jan Vytrval | 1:47 | 51:06.9; 12:14.6; 12:15.5; 13:14.8; 13:31.0 | 11 | +4:56.6 |
