= United States Nordic Combined Championships 2012 =

U.S. National Championship
- 2012

Tournament information
- Sport: Nordic combined
- Location: Fox River Grove, Illinois
- Date: October 1, 2011
- Established: 1932
- Administrator: USSA

Final positions
- Champion: Bill Demong
- 1st runner-up: Johnny Spillane
- 2nd runner-up: Bryan Fletcher

The United States Nordic Combined Championships 2012 took place on October 1, 2011 in Fox River Grove, Illinois. The olympic medalist Bill Demong won the race.

== Results ==
Rank	Athlete
1	Bill Demong
2	Johnny Spillane
3	Bryan Fletcher
4	Todd Lodwick
5	Erik Lynch
6	Taylor Fletcher
7	Nick Hendrickson
8	Wes Savill
9	Brett Denney
10	Adam Loomis
11	Tyler Smith
12	Sebastian Dandura
13	Nathaniel Mah
14	Aleck Gantick
15	Ben Berend
16	Nick Mattoon
