= United States Nordic Combined Championships 2013 =

- 2013

Tournament information
- Sport: Nordic Combined
- Location: Utah, United States
- Dates: August 3, 2012–August 6, 2012
- Venue(s): Park City, Utah
- Participants: 18

Final positions
- Champions: Todd Lodwick

The United States Nordic Combined Championships 2013 took place on August 3 & 6, 2012 in Park City, Utah. Todd Lodwick won the race.

== Results ==
Rank	Athlete	Rank after ski jumping
1	Todd Lodwick	8
2	Johnny Spillane	5
3	Taylor Fletcher	6
4	Bryan Fletcher	4
5	Ales Vodsedalek	1
6	Bill Demong	3
7	Adam Loomis	2
8	Michael Ward	7
9	Nick Hendrickson	15
10	Wesley Savill	13
11	Tyler Smith	20
12	Nathaniel Mah	10
13	Ben Berend	9
14	Spen Knickerbocker	16
15	Aleck Gantick	14
16	Jasper Good	17
17	Cliff Field	12
18	Nicholas Madden	21
