= United States Nordic Combined Championships 2010 =

U.S. National Championship
- 2010

Tournament information
- Sport: Nordic combined
- Location: Lake Placid, New York
- Date: October 10, 2009
- Established: 1932
- Administrator: USSA

Final positions
- Champion: Todd Lodwick
- 1st runner-up: Brett Camerota
- 2nd runner-up: Bryan Fletcher

The United States Nordic Combined Championships 2010 took place on October 10, 2009 in Lake Placid, New York. Todd Lodwick won the race.

== Results ==
Rank	Athlete
1	Todd Lodwick
2	Brett Camerota
3	Bryan Fletcher
4	Sturla Sandoy
5	Taylor Fletcher
6	Alex Glueck
7	Nick Hendrickson
8	Alex Miller
9	Carl Van Loan
10	Willy Graves
