= United States Nordic Combined Championships 2009 =

The United States Nordic Combined Championships 2009 took place on October 11, 2008 in Lake Placid, New York. Johnny Spillane won the race, earning his first Nordic combined national title.

Canadian athlete Jason Myslicki, raced together with the Americans and finished in fifth place.

== Results ==
Rank	Athlete	Club
1	Johnny Spillane	Steamboat Springs Winter Sports Club
2	Bill Demong	Vermontville, New York
3	Todd Lodwick	Steamboat Springs Winter Sports Club
4	Bryan Fletcher	Steamboat Springs Winter Sports Club
5	Jason Myslicki	Altius Nordic Ski Club (Canada)
6	Brett Camerota	Park City Nordic Ski Club
7	Eric Camerota	Park City Nordic Ski Club
8	Willy Graves	Putney, Vermont
9	Taylor Fletcher	Steamboat Springs Winter Sports Club
10	Brett Denney	Steamboat Springs Winter Sports Club
