= John Bower =

American Nordic combined skier

Personal information
- Nationality: (United States) USA
- Born: 8 November 1940 (age 85) Auburn, Maine, USA
- Died: 6 June 2017 (aged 76) Park City, Utah, USA

Sport
- Sport: Skiing

John Bower (November 8, 1940 – June 6, 2017) was an American Nordic combined skier who competed in the 1960s and later went on to become a coach of the American Nordic skiing team for the 1976 and 1980 Winter Olympic team. He also became the first non-European to ever win at the Holmenkollen Ski Festival in Norway with his 1968 victory in the Nordic combined event, winning the prestigious King's Cup.

A native of Auburn, Maine, Bower attended Middlebury College in Vermont, where he won the NCAA national championship in Nordic combined in 1961. After graduating from Middlebury in 1963, he joined the United States Army and serve during the mid-1960s. Bower also won the national Nordic combined event four times (1963, 1966–8). Competing in two Winter Olympics, Bower finished 15th in the Nordic combined event at Innsbruck in 1964 and 13th in the same event at Grenoble in 1968.

After his retirement from Nordic combined competition, Bower went on to coach the Nordic skiing team for both the 1976 and 1980 Winter Olympics and later served as program director for the U.S. Nordic Combined Ski Team. From 1980 to 1988, he was the athletic director at Principia College in Elsah, Illinois. He was once again director of the Nordic skiing team from 1988 to 1990. He was the director of the Utah Olympic Park from its opening in 1990 until his retirement in 1999. He and his wife Bonnie resided in Park City, Utah, where Bonnie started the Park City Winter School to allow skiers to attend school in the summer while competing in the winter. Bower's son Ricky (born 1980) won the Snowboarding half-pipe World Championships in Germany in 1999.

In 1999, Sports Illustrated magazine ranked him 19th among Maine's 50 Greatest Athletes of the 20th century. He was the first of five Americans to win a Nordic combined event at the Holmenkollen Ski Festival, considered the premier event in Nordic combined. Other American King's Cup winners include Kerry Lynch (1983), Todd Lodwick (1998), Bill Demong (2009) and Bryan Fletcher (2012).
