= Runggaldier =

Runggaldier is a surname. Notable people with the surname include:

- Alexia Runggaldier (born 1991), Italian biathlete
- Alfred Runggaldier (born 1962), Italian cross country skier
- Elena Runggaldier (born 1990), Italian ski jumper and Nordic combined skier
- Lukas Runggaldier (born 1987), Italian Nordic combined skier
- Peter Runggaldier (born 1968), Italian former Alpine skier
