= Vincelette =

Vincelette is a surname. Notable people with the surname include:

- Alfred Vincelette (1935–1997), American skier
- Dan Vincelette (born 1967), Canadian ice hockey player
