= Pat Ahern =

Pat Ahern may refer to:

- Pat Ahearne (born 1969), American baseball pitcher
- Pat Aherne (1901–1970), English film actor
- Pat Ahern (director) (born 1932), Irish priest, musician and founder of Siamsa Tíre, the Irish National Folk Theatre
- Pat Ahern (skier) (born 1960), American Olympic skier
