= Olympic Sports Complex =

Olympic Sports Complex may refer to:

- Athens Olympic Sports Complex in Greece, created following the 2004 Summer Olympics
- Lake Placid Olympic Sports Complex in the United States, created following the 1980 Winter Olympics
