= Tim Hug =

Swiss Nordic combined skier (born 1987)

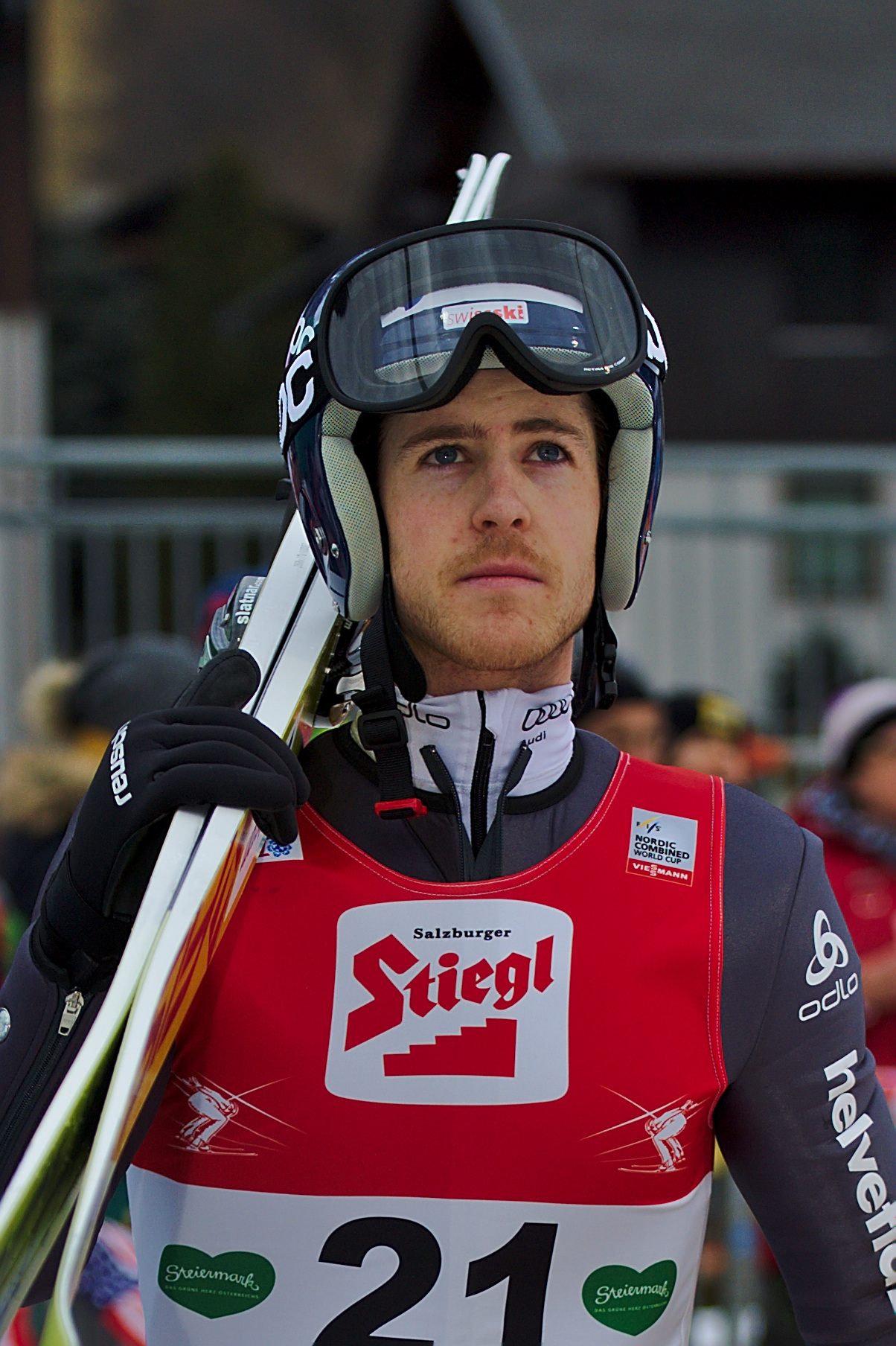

Personal information
- Born: 11 August 1987 (age 39) Solothurn, Switzerland
- Height: 1.86 m (6 ft 1 in)

Sport
- Sport: Skiing
- Club: SC Gerlafingen

World Cup career
- Seasons: 2008–
- Indiv. podiums: 2
- Indiv. wins: 1
- Updated on 11 February 2017

Tim Hug (born 11 August 1987) is a Swiss Nordic combined skier who has been competing since 2003. At the 2010 Winter Olympics, he finished 9th in the 4 x 5 km team, 33rd in the 10 km individual large hill, and 35th in the individual normal hill events.

At the FIS Nordic World Ski Championships 2009 in Liberec, Hug finished 30th in the 10 km individual large hill, 39th in the 10 km mass start, and 41st in the 10 km individual normal hill events.

His best World Cup finish was ninth in the 4 x 5 team event at Germany in 2009 while his best individual finish was 11th in a 10 km individual large hill event at Italy in 2010.
