= Jim Page (skier) =

American Nordic combined skier

Personal information
- Born: May 29, 1941 (age 84) Lake Placid, New York, United States

Sport
- Sport: Nordic combined

Jim Page (born May 29, 1941) is an American skier. He competed in the Nordic combined event at the 1964 Winter Olympics. Page later became a coach, and in 1987 was involved in a blood doping scheme with American skier Kerry Lynch, who subsequently had his silver medal for 15 km individual event at the 1987 FIS Nordic World Ski Championships stripped. Page was given a lifetime ban from the sport, which was later lifted in 1990.
