= Katie Koczynski =

American skeleton racer (born 1980)

Personal information
- Born: September 16, 1980 (age 44); Upper Nyack, New York, U.S.

Sport
- Country: Skelton racing

Kathrine "Katie" Koczynski-Demong (born September 16, 1980, in Upper Nyack, New York) is an American skeleton racer who competed internationally from 2000 until 2005. Koczynski competed on the FIBT World Cup circuit from 2002 through 2005 and placed fourth at a world cup race in Calgary in November 2003. Koczynski competed in three world championships for the United States in 2003, 2004 and 2005.

Koczynski failed to qualify for the 2006 US Olympic Team and retired from international racing to complete her degree at Columbia University. She graduated from Columbia University in May 2007 magna cum laude with a degree in Sociology. Her best finish at the FIBT World Championships was 11th at Nagano in 2003.

At the 2010 Winter Olympics on February 25, Koczynski's boyfriend, gold medal skier in the Nordic combined Bill Demong, proposed to her in front of teammates and coaches at the US team headquarters near Vancouver. Koczynsk said yes. Koczynski and Demong discussed how this happened on NBC's Today show the following morning.

On July 11, 2010, Koczynski married Demong in Lake Placid, New York.
