= Ayane Miyazaki =

Japanese Nordic combined skier

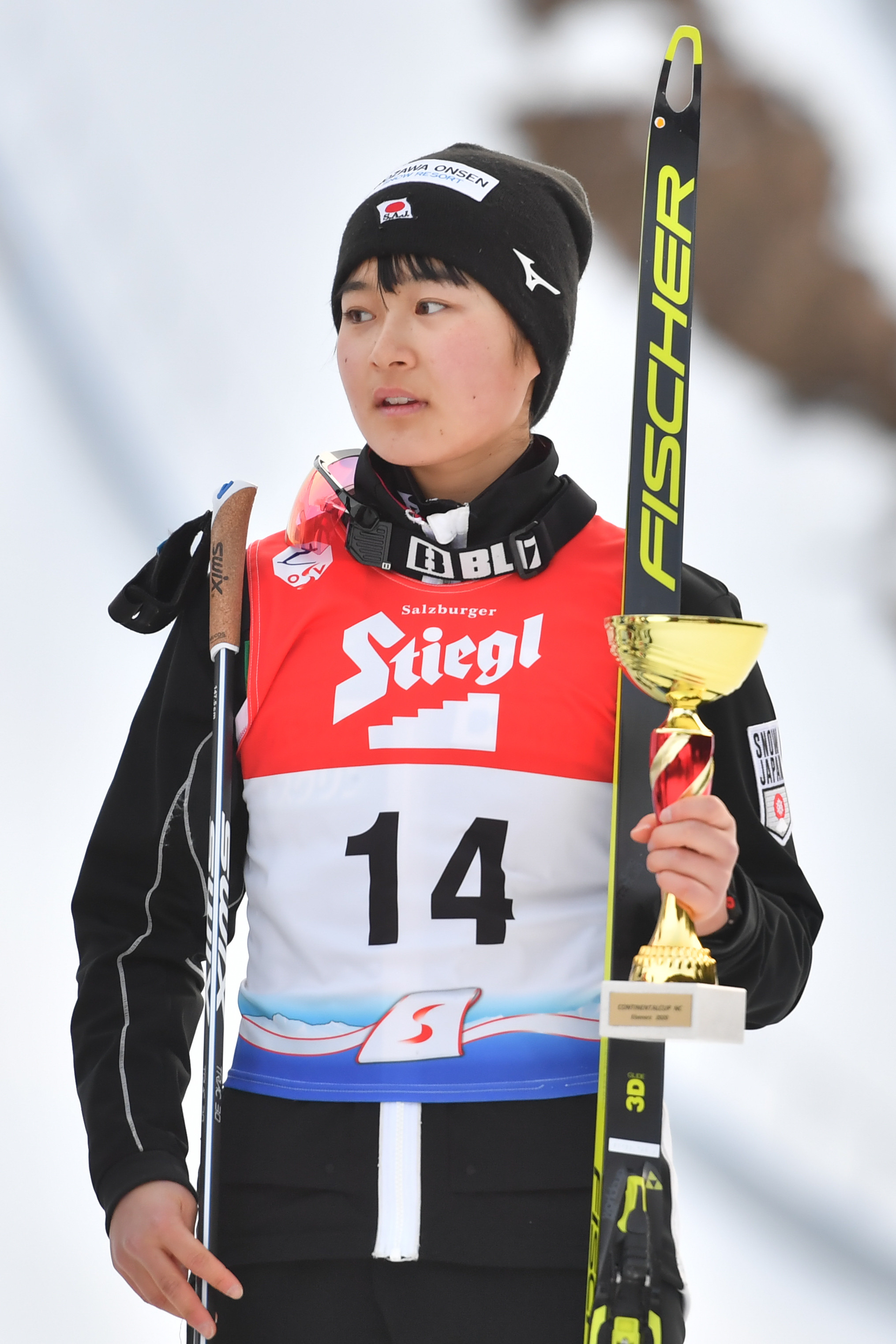
- Miyazaki at the 2020 FIS Nordic Combined Continental Cup

Personal information
- Nationality: Japan
- Born: 15 September 2002 (age 23)

Sport
- Sport: Nordic combined
Medal record
Women's Nordic combined
Representing Japan
Junior World Championships
Gold medal – first place	2019 Lahti	Individual
Winter Youth Olympic Games
Silver medal – second place	2020 Lausanne	Individual
Winter Universiade
Bronze medal – third place	2023 Lake Placid	Individual

Ayane Miyazaki (Japanese: 宮﨑 彩音, Hepburn: Miyazaki Ayane; born 15 September 2002) is a Japanese Nordic combined skier. She medaled silver at the 2020 Winter Youth Olympics individually and also as part of the Japanese ski jumping mixed team.

== Early life and education ==
Miyazaki was born on 15 September 2002 in Nozawaonsen, Nagano Prefecture. She attended Nozawaonsen Junior High School and Iiyama High School.

== Career ==
At the 2017–18 FIS Nordic Combined Continental Cup, Miyazaki ranked second overall behind Russia's Stefaniya Nadymova, having placed first once, second twice, and third once across four events.

In 2019, Miyazaki became the first female junior world champion after winning the normal hill/5 km event at the 2019 Nordic Junior World Ski Championships.

Miyazaki represented Japan at the 2020 Winter Youth Olympics, medaling silver in the individual normal hill/4 km event and also medaling silver as part of the Japanese team in the mixed team ski jumping event.

In the 2020 Nordic Junior World Ski Championships, Miyazaki placed eighth individually but medaled bronze as part of the Japanese team in the mixed team event.

Miyazaki placed tenth in the 2021 FIS Nordic World Ski Championships.
