= Takehiro Watanabe (skier) =

Japanese Nordic combined skier (born 1993)

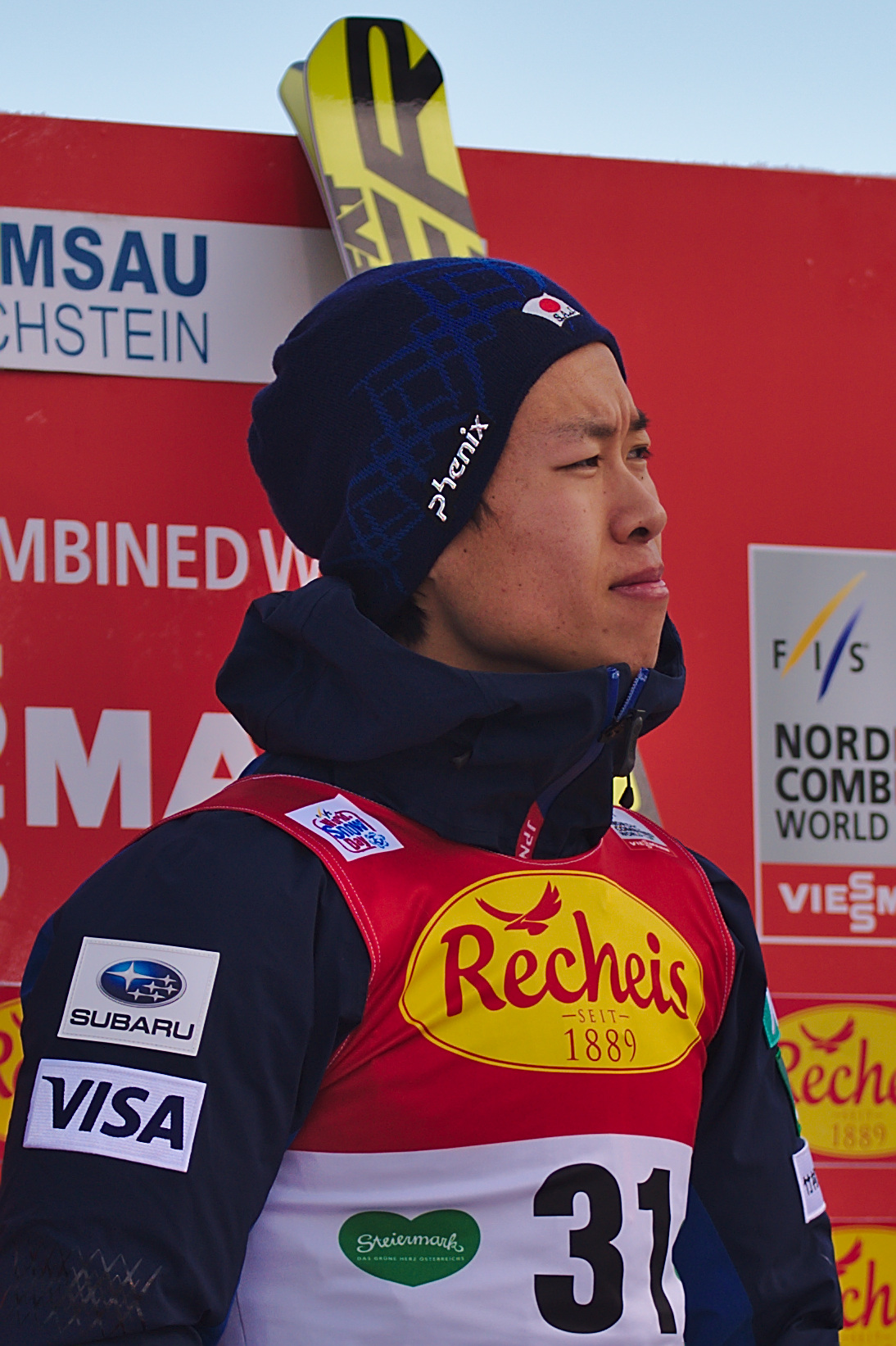

Personal information
- Full name: Takehiro Watanabe
- Born: 13 July 1993 (age 33) Aizuwakamatsu, Fukushima

Sport
- Sport: Skiing
- Club: Gallium Ski Club

World Cup career
- Seasons: -
Medal record
Men's Nordic combined skiing
Representing Japan

Takehiro Watanabe (渡部 剛弘, Watanabe Takehiro; born 13 July 1993) is a Japanese Nordic combined skier. He was born in Aizuwakamatsu, Fukushima. He competed in the World Cup 2015 season.

He represented Japan at the FIS Nordic World Ski Championships 2015 in Falun.
