= Paul Gerstgraser =

Austrian Nordic combined skier (born 1995)

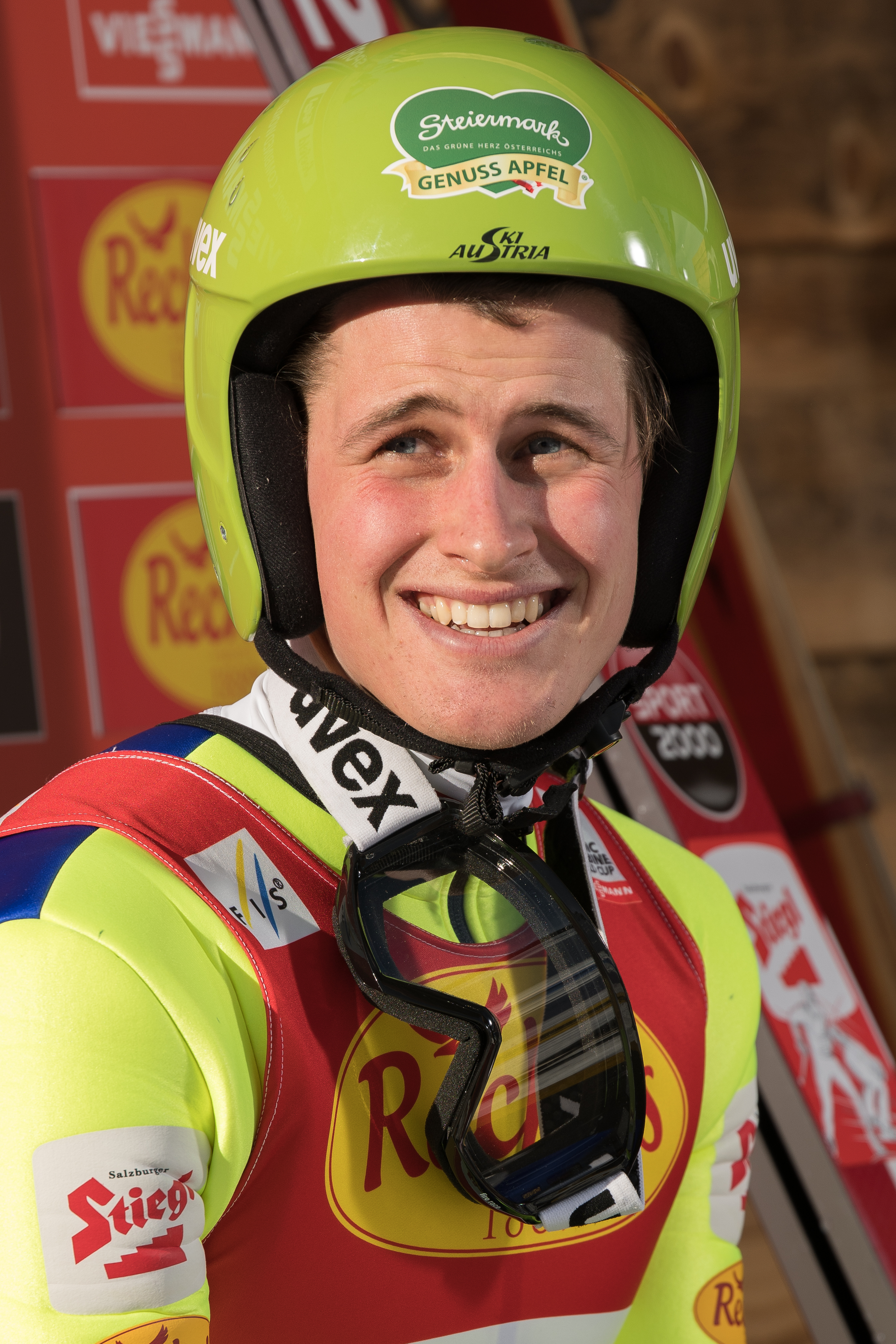

Personal information
- Nationality: Austria
- Born: 22 May 1995 (age 31)

Sport
- Sport: Skiing
- Club: SV Schwarzach-Salzburg

World Cup career
- Seasons: 2014–2020
- Indiv. starts: 50
Medal record
World Championships
Bronze medal – third place	2017 Lahti	4 x 5 km team

Paul Gerstgraser (born 22 May 1995) is a retired Austrian Nordic combined skier who competed internationally with the Austrian national team.

He competed at the FIS Nordic World Ski Championships 2017 in Lahti, Finland.
