= Stephen Schumann =

American philatelist (born 1942)

Stephen Douglas Schumann (born 1942) is an American philatelist who was appointed to the Roll of Distinguished Philatelists in 2015. Schumann specialises in collecting postal stationery and is an internationally accredited philatelic judge. He received the Luff Award in 2007 from the American Philatelic Society.
