= Sindre Ure Søtvik =

Norwegian Nordic combined skier

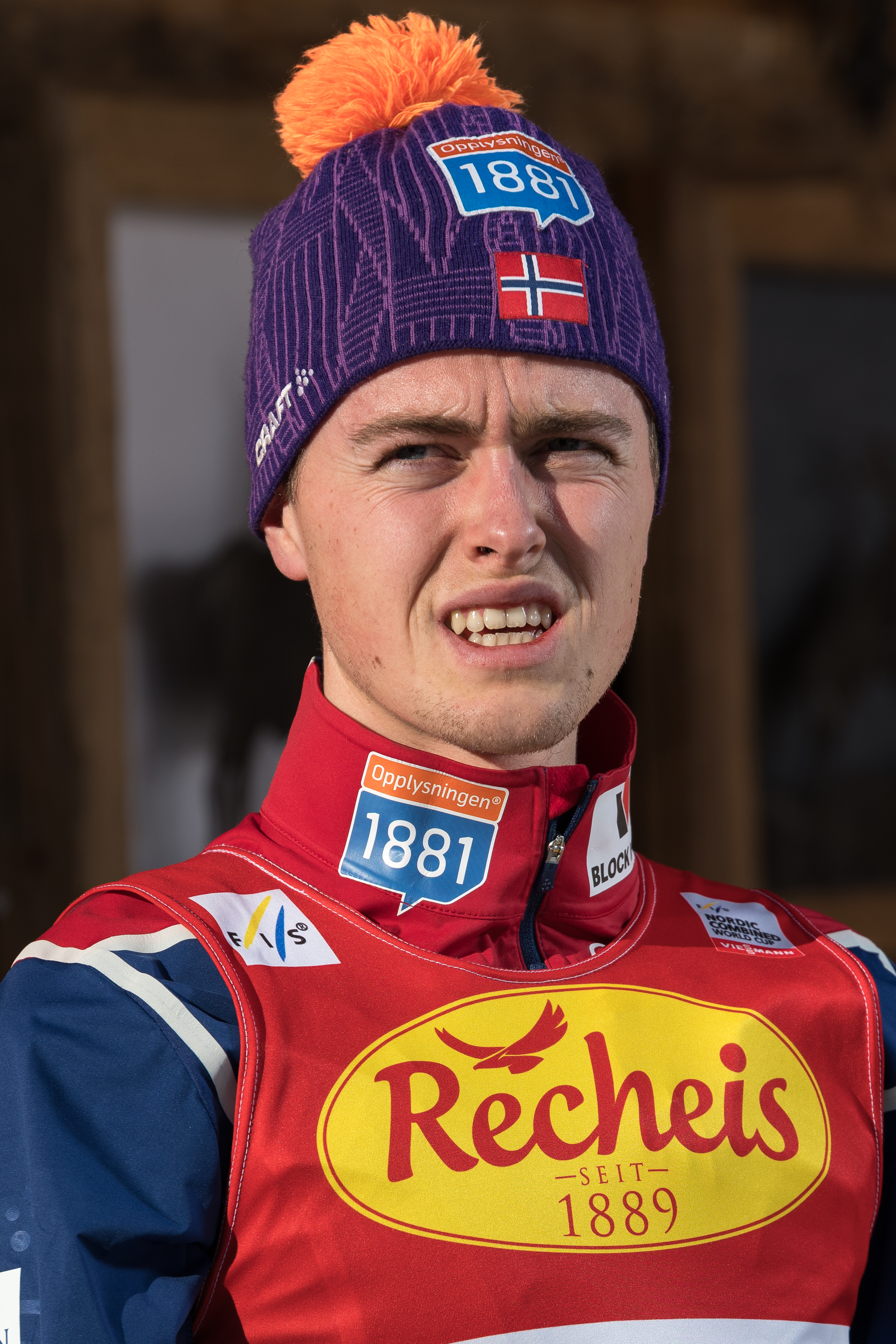

Personal information
- Born: 21 September 1992 (age 33)

Sport
- Sport: Skiing
- Club: II Eldar

World Cup career
- Seasons: 2013–2020
- Indiv. starts: 30

Sindre Ure Søtvik (born 21 September 1992) is a retired Norwegian Nordic combined skier.

He finished fourth in the team event at the 2012 Junior World Championships. He made his Continental Cup debut in January 2011 in Klingenthal. Competing regularly over the next years, he recorded his first victory in January 2015 in Planica, and followed with two more victories later.

He made his World Cup debut in March 2013 in Holmenkollen. He collected his first World Cup points in November 2014 in Rukatunturi with 24th place. His breakthrough came in February 2018 in Hakuba, finishing 11th and 15th in two races.

He represented the sports club IL Eldar.
