= Eric Camerota =

American Nordic combined skier

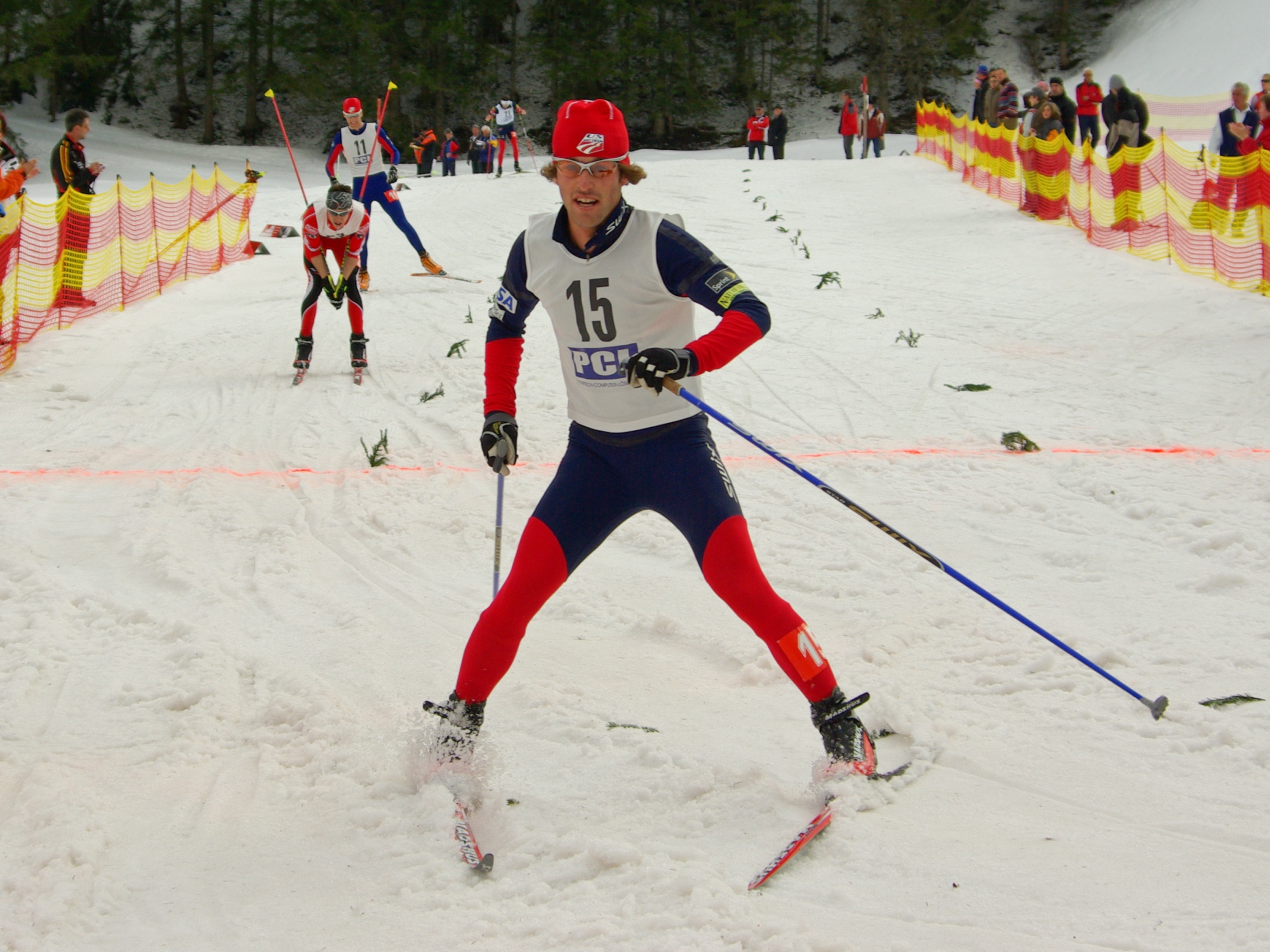
- Eric Camerota in March 2008

Personal information
- Born: Eric Camerota; January 9, 1985 (age 41) Salt Lake City, United States

Sport
- Sport: Skiing

Eric Camerota (born January 9, 1985) is an American Nordic combined skier.

Camerota was born in Salt Lake City, Utah, and currently residing in Park City, Utah. His twin brother, Brett Camerota, is also a Nordic combined skier.

Competing in the 2006 Winter Olympics, he finished 39th in the large hill event at Torino, Italy.

Camerota's best finish at the FIS Nordic World Ski Championships was 25th in the 10 km Individual Mass Start event at Liberec, Czech Republic in the FIS Nordic World Ski Championships 2009.
