= Kerry Lynch =

American former Nordic combined skier (born 1957)

Personal information
- Full name: Kerry Joel Lynch
- Born: July 31, 1957 (age 69) Denver, Colorado, U.S.
Medal record
Men's Nordic combined
Representing United States
World Championships
Disqualified	1987 Oberstdorf	15 km individual

Kerry Joel Lynch (born July 31, 1957 in Denver, Colorado) is an American former Nordic combined skier who competed from 1979 to 1987. He is best known for his doping scandal at the 1987 FIS Nordic World Ski Championships in Oberstdorf, West Germany in which he and his coach Jim Page approved a plan to give Lynch an illegal transfusion to increase his red blood cell count. Lynch would finish second in the 15 km individual event behind Norway's Torbjørn Løkken, only to be stripped of his medal when he and Page confessed to the scandal. Lynch would serve a two-year suspension as a result and was prohibited from participating in the 1988 Winter Olympics. He is the only Nordic combined athlete to ever been stripped of a medal either in the Winter Olympics or in the FIS Nordic World Ski Championships. The United States would not win a Nordic combined medal at the Nordic skiing World Championships until Johnny Spillane's gold medal in the 7.5 km sprint event at Val di Fiemme in 2003.

Despite his doping controversy Lynch competed in two Winter Olympics, earning his best finish of 13th at Sarajevo in 1984. He would also become only the second American to win anything at the Holmenkollen ski festival when he won the Nordic combined event in 1983, fifteen years after John Bower won the same event. Lynch's only other World Cup victory also took place in 1983 in a 15 km individual event in Austria.

He also was three-time national champion in the Nordic combined event (1981, 1983, 1986).
