= Alexa Brabec =

American skier

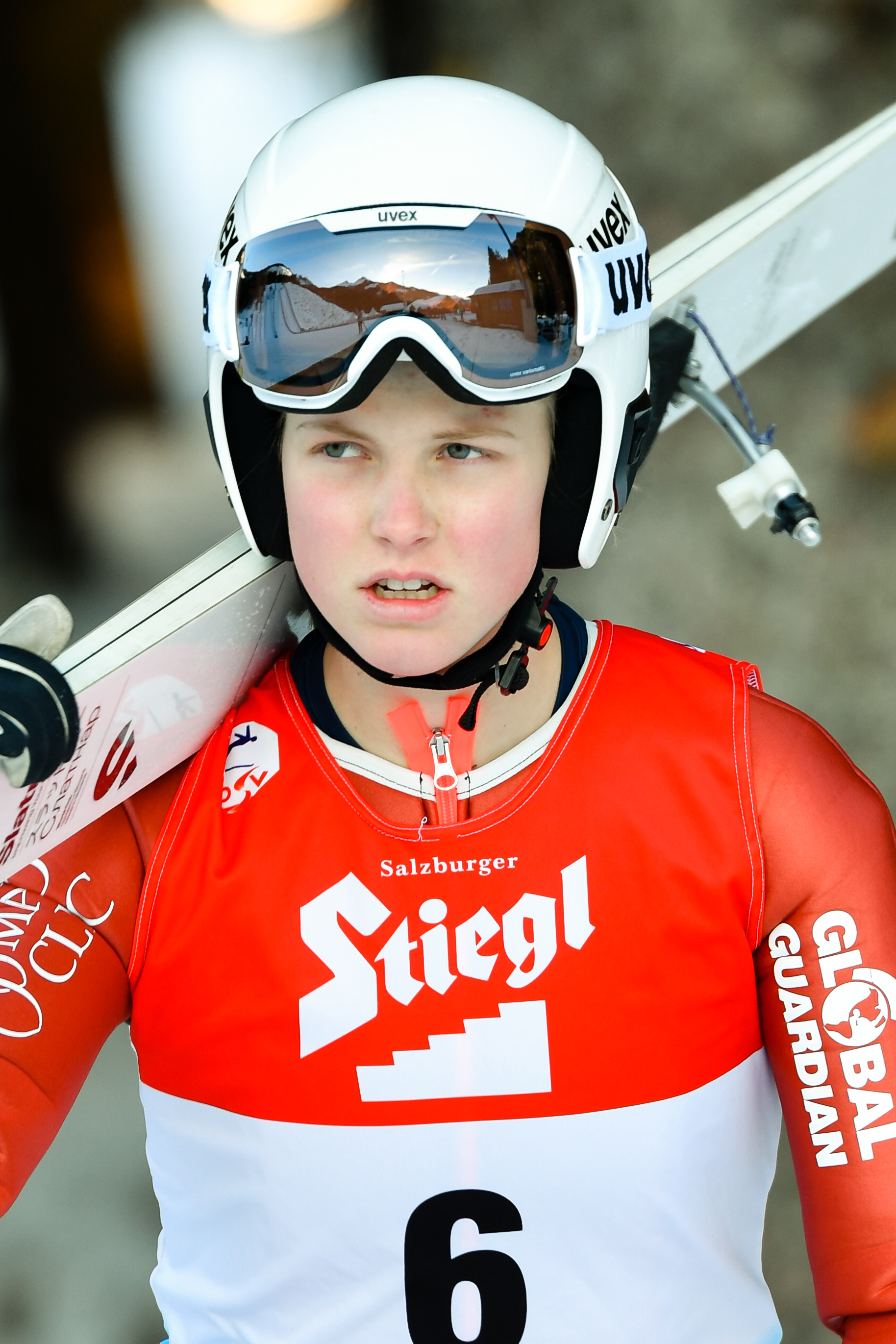

Personal information
- Nationality: United States
- Born: 8 October 2004 (age 21) Steamboat Springs, Colorado, U.S.

Sport
- Sport: Skiing
Medal record
Women's Nordic combined
Representing United States
Junior World Championship
Silver medal – second place	2024 Planica	Individual normal hill
Silver medal – second place	2024 Planica	Team sprint normal hill
- Updated on 14 February 2025

Alexa Brabec (born October 8, 2004) is an American skier who competes in Nordic combined.

== Biography ==
Brabec was born on October 8, 2004. She is from Steamboat Springs, Colorado. She grew up skiing for the Steamboat Springs Winter Sports Club.

Brabec was named to the first team of women to represent the United States in Nordic Combined at a World Championship event,

In 2020, Brabec competed at the Youth Olympic Games, which was the first time women's Nordic Combined was included in the competition.

Brabec was a member of the U.S. World Championship team in 2021 and 2023.

In 2024, Brabec placed second overall in the HS102/5 km event at the Nordic Junior World Ski Championships, winning the first-ever medal in Women's Nordic Combined for the United States at the Junior World Championships. She also placed second over all in the Team Sprint HS102/2×4.5 event with Kai McKinnon, similarly winning the United States's first medal in a Women's Nordic Combined team event.

As Nordic combined is the only Winter Olympic sport without a women's competition, Brabec's family, particularly her mother, who is a lawyer, advocates for gender equity in the sport.

== Personal life ==
Brabec is a student at the University of Utah.

== Competitive history ==
This is an incomplete list of Brabec's competitive history.

Year	Competition	Event	Location	Rank	Citation
2020	Youth Olympics	Girls' Normal hill/4 km	Lausanne, Switzerland	14	
2020	Youth Olympics	cross country	Lausanne, Switzerland	15	
2020	Youth Olympics	mixed team	Lausanne, Switzerland	11	
2021	FIS Nordic World Ski Championships	ski jumping	Oberstdorf, Germany	27	
2021	FIS Nordic World Ski Championships	cross country	Oberstdorf, Germany	26	
2021/22	World Cup	Hs106/5 km	Val di Fiemme, Italy	20	
2022/23	Continental Cup	HS109/7.5 km	Rena, Norway	6	
2023	FIS Nordic World Ski Championships	ski jumping	Planica, Slovenia	31	
2023	FIS Nordic World Ski Championships	cross country	Planica, Slovenia	28	
2024	Nordic Junior World Ski Championships	HS102/5 km	Planica, Slovenia	2nd place, silver medalist(s)	
2024	Nordic Junior World Ski Championships	team sprint HS102/2×4,5 km	Planica, Slovenia	2nd place, silver medalist(s)	
2025	FIS Nordic World Ski Championships	5 km mass start/individual normal hill	Trondheim, Norway	4	
2025	FIS Nordic World Ski Championships	Individual normal hill/5 km	Trondheim, Norway	11	
