= Hideaki Nagai =

Japanese Nordic combined skier (born 1983)

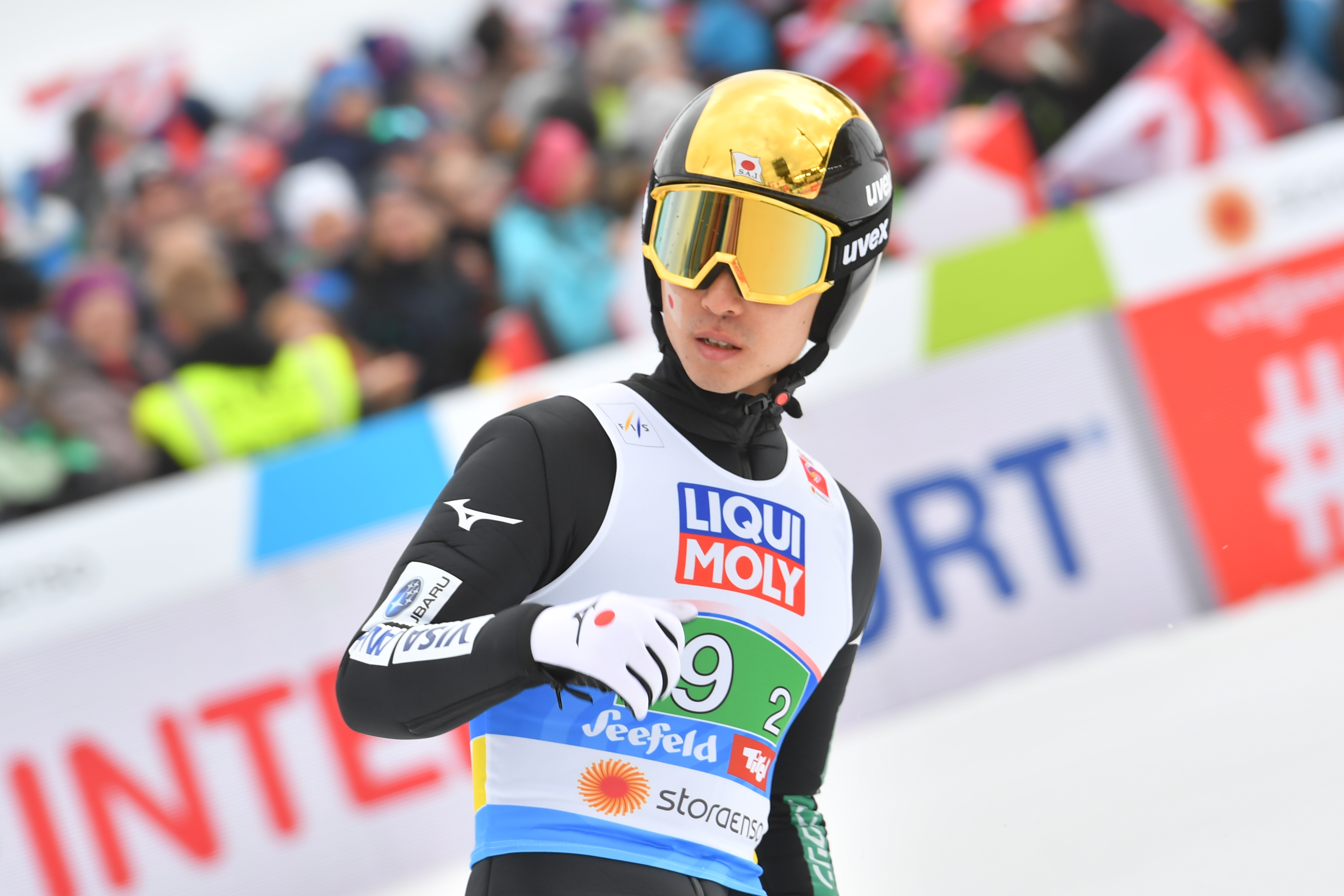
- Nagai in 2019

Personal information
- Nationality: Japanese
- Born: 5 September 1983 (age 42) Hachimantai, Iwate

Sport
- Sport: Nordic combined skiing
Medal record
Men's Nordic combined
Representing Japan
Olympic Games
Bronze medal – third place	2022 Beijing	Team LH
World Championships
Bronze medal – third place	2019 Seefeld	Team NH

Hideaki Nagai (永井 秀昭, Nagai Hideaki; born 5 September 1983) is a Japanese Nordic combined skier. He was born in Hachimantai in the Iwate Prefecture. He competed at the FIS Nordic World Ski Championships 2013 in Val di Fiemme, and at the 2014 Winter Olympics in Sochi. He competed at the 2018 Winter Olympics, where he placed 12th in Individual large hill/10 km, 14th in Individual normal hill/10 km, and fourth with the Japanese team in the Team large hill/4 × 5 km.
