= Saranac Lake High School =

Public school in Saranac Lake, New York, US

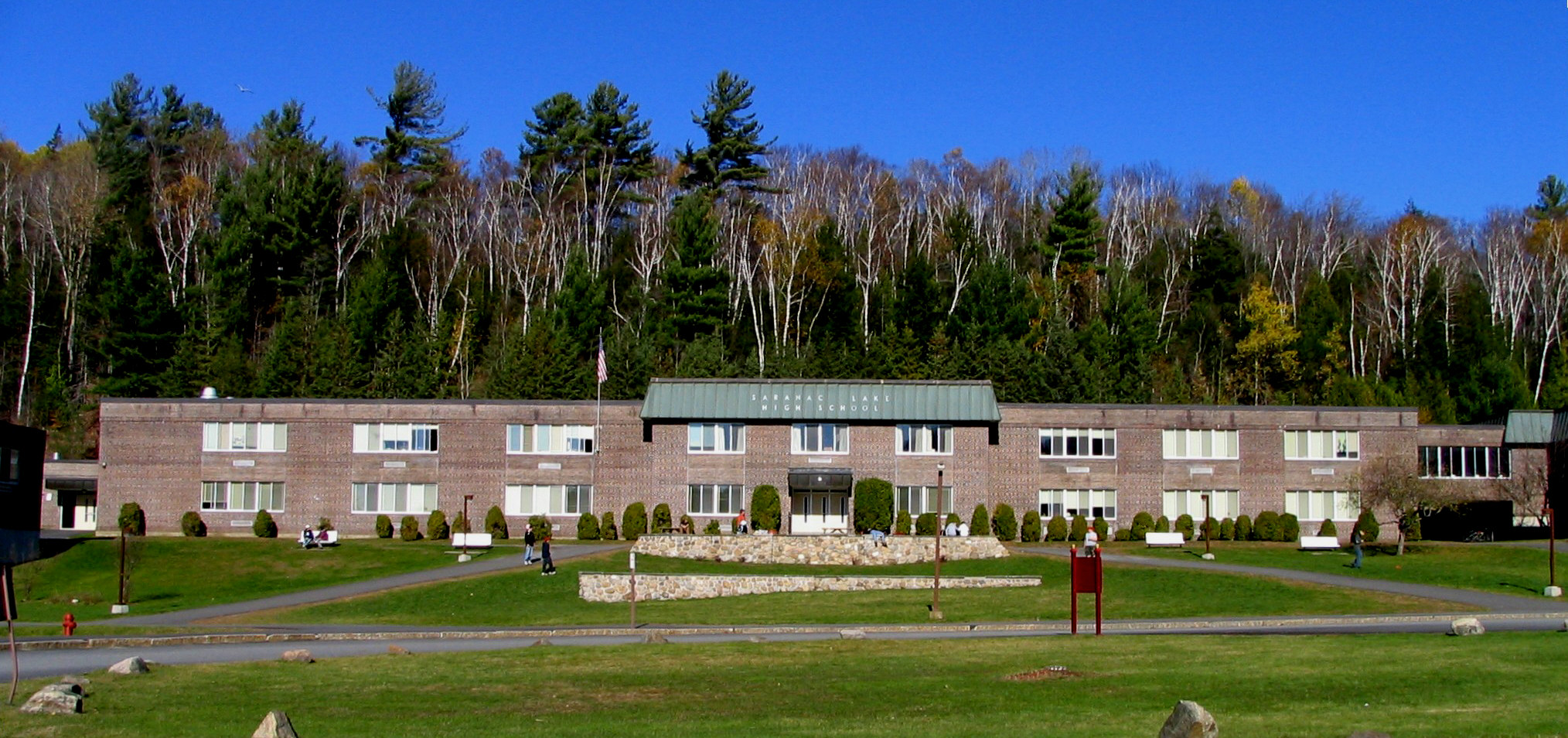

Location
- 79 Canaras Avenue; Saranac Lake, New York; United States; 44.32779°N 74.14404°W

Information
- Type: Public High
- Motto: We put the "Excel" in Excelsior
- Established: 1890
- School district: Saranac Lake Central School District
- NCES School ID: 362574003535
- Principal: Joshua Dann
- Faculty: 33.74 (on an FTE basis)
- Grades: 9–12
- Enrollment: 374 (2023–2024)
- Student to teacher ratio: 11.08
- Colors: Red and White
- Mascot: Red Storm
- Yearbook: Canaras
- Website: highschool.slcs.org
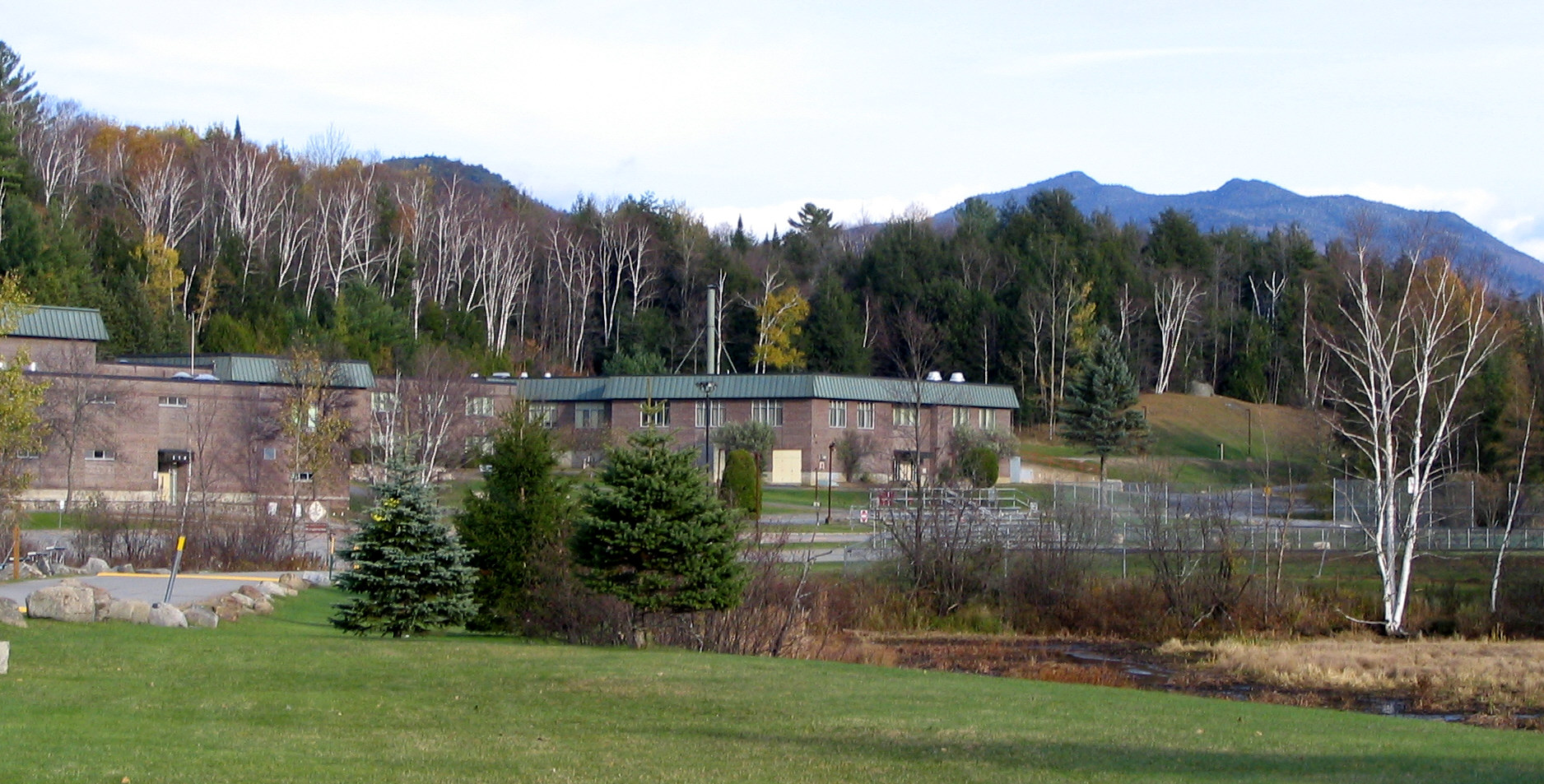

Saranac Lake High School is located in the village of Saranac Lake, New York, United States. There were 374 students in grades 9 through 12 in the 2023–2024 school year. It is under the jurisdiction of the Saranac Lake Central School District, whose offices are housed on the ground floor of the auditorium building. The school is housed in a 98,000-square-foot (9,100 m^{2}) building, completed in 1969.

The majority of graduating students from Saranac Lake High School attend an institution of higher education. Approximately one-half of each graduating class continues on to a four-year college or university. Recently, students have matriculated to institutions such as Amherst College, the California Institute of Technology, Columbia University, Cornell University, Hamilton College, Harvard University, Oberlin College, and many other highly regarded colleges and universities. About one-half of the students continuing their education from Saranac Lake High School attend a State University of New York (SUNY) institution, such as SUNY Plattsburgh and SUNY Albany. High school seniors that have shown particular academic excellence are accepted into SUNY Plattsburgh and SUNY North Country Community College with free tuition.

== History ==
Saranac Lake's first schools date to 1838. In 1870, a new school was built in the center of the village. In 1890, the first high school was built, and was dedicated by U.S. President Benjamin Harrison. In 1924, a new school was built on Petrova Avenue that housed grades 1 through 12. The Petrova School was dedicated in February 1925. Then in 1968 and 1969 the present building was erected; the former school became an elementary and middle school. Classes were first held in the current school on December 1, 1969 following the Thanksgiving holiday break.

== Arts ==
Recently, the Saranac Lake High School has been recognized for its music program (under the direction of Drew Benware and Keith Kogut), with which about one half of the student body participates in. Choral conductor Drew Benware was named a national semifinalist as a Grammy Award music educator in 2017. Additionally, a number of students have participated in the NYSSMA and NAFME Conference All-State and All-Eastern music festivals for both instrumental and vocal music.

== Athletics ==
The school colors are red and white, and the school's sports teams have been called the Red Storm since 2001. Sports include Football, Soccer, Cross Country, Basketball, Ice Hockey, Basketball, Downhill Skiing, Cross Country Skiing, Volleyball, Lacrosse, Baseball, Softball, Track and Golf.

SLHS teams have won New York State titles in boys speed skating three times in 1930, 1931, and 1932; boys cross country in 1995 and 2018; and girls alpine skiing in 2008 and 2015. In 1995, the school played against Leroy for the New York State Class C High School Championship in the Carrier Dome in Syracuse. The 2004-2005 Boys Ice Hockey team made it to the New York State Final Four for the first time in school history, defeating Williamsville East High School, the defending State Champions to do so. The Boys Ice Hockey team also made it to the NYS Final Four in 2011–2012.

In 1998 the Saranac Lake football team defeated Voorheesville, at home on Ken Wilson field, to advance to the state Final Four in Kingston, New York where they lost to the eventual state champions Edgemont. In 2008 the Red Storm football team defeated Watervilet to visit Kingston again and play in the state Final Four. They did the same again in 2010 when they defeated Hoosick Falls and went on to play Bronxville.

The Philadelphia Eagles NFL team held training camp at Saranac Lake High School from 1946 to 1948.
