= Mike Devecka =

American former Nordic combined skier

Personal information
- Full name: Michael Alan Devecka
- Nationality: American
- Born: November 13, 1947 (age 78) Portland, Oregon, U.S.
- Height: 5 ft 8 in (1.73 m)
- Weight: 147 lb (67 kg)

Sport
- Sport: Nordic combined skier

Michael Alan Devecka (born November 13, 1947, in Portland, Oregon) is an American former Nordic combined skier who competed in the 1972 Winter Olympics, 1976 Winter Olympics, and in the 1980 Winter Olympics. His daughter from his relationship with Dianne Holum is Kirstin, a Catholic sister based in Leeds, England, where she has served as Sister Catherine, and a former speed skater.
