= Lake Placid Olympic Sports Complex =

Winter sports complex in Lake Placid, New York, US

Coordinates: 44.220222°N 73.921337°W

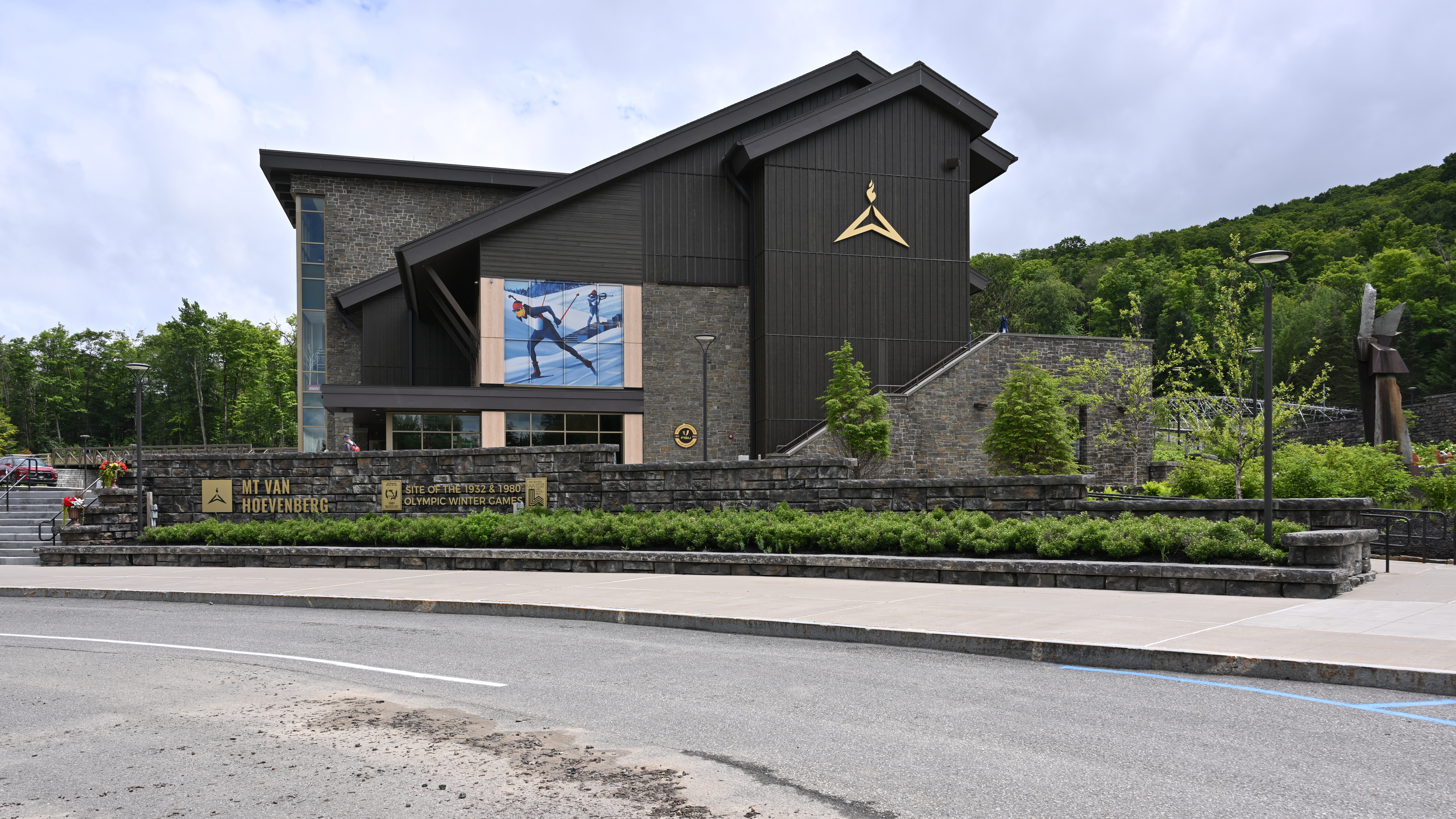
Main building at Mt Van Hoevenberg, Lake Placid, New York

The Lake Placid Olympic Sports Complex is a winter sports complex located at the foot of Mount Van Hoevenberg near Lake Placid, New York. Part of the Olympic Regional Development Authority (ORDA), it was created following the 1980 Winter Olympics.

The complex includes a bobsleigh, luge, and skeleton track along with trails for both biathlon and cross-country skiing.

== Venues ==
=== Bobsleigh, luge, and skeleton track ===
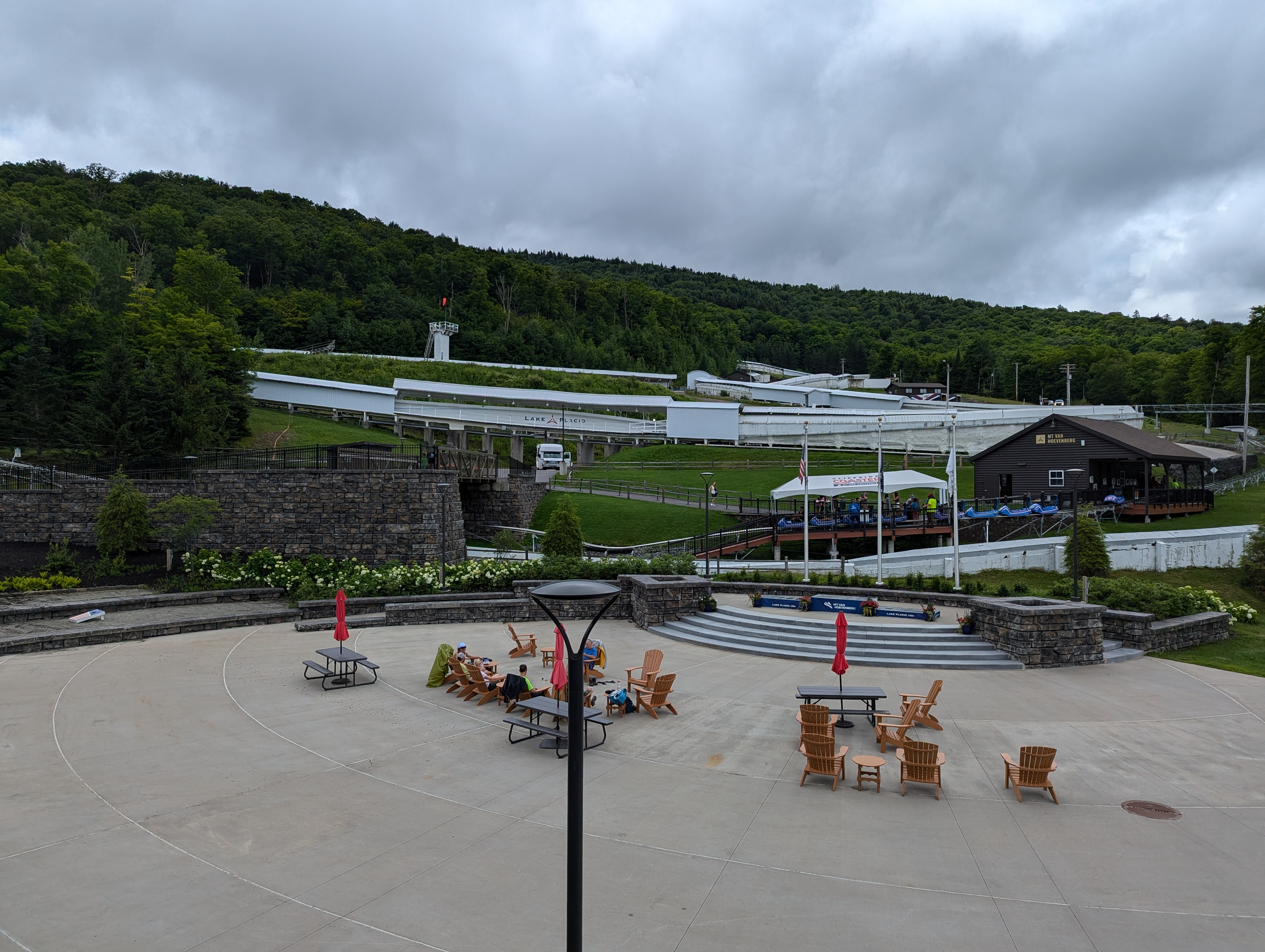
Mt. Van Hoevenberg as seen in 2024.

Constructed in 1930 for the 1932 Winter Olympics, the track was the first bobsleigh track located outside of Europe. In 1949, it hosted the FIBT World Championships, also the first outside of Europe. The original bobsleigh track was demolished in 1978 to pave the way for an artificial track for the 1980 Winter Olympics with a separate luge track being constructed for those same games. The luge track was the first luge track in North America when it was completed in 1979. In 1983, the luge track was the first venue to host the FIL World Luge Championships outside of Europe. Both tracks were demolished in the late 1990s and a combination track was constructed in early 2000 in time for the only Winter Goodwill Games. The track is a regular venue for World Cup competitions in bobsleigh, luge, and skeleton. In 2009, the track became the first combination track to host the bobsleigh, luge, and skeleton world championships in a non-Winter Olympic year.

The current track is 1455 meters long with 20 curves and an average grade of 9.8%.

=== Cross country and biathlon center ===
The complex is home to the Lake Placid Olympic Sports Complex Cross Country Biathlon Center.

== Events ==
=== Annual Events ===
- Winter Empire State Games

=== Notable events ===
- Winter Olympics: 1932, 1980
- Winter Universiade: 1972, 2023
- Winter Goodwill Games: 2000
- Biathlon World Cup: 1979-80, 1986-87
- Biathlon World Championships: 1973, 1987
- FIBT World Championships: 1949, 1961, 1969, 1973, 1978, 1983, 1997 (men's skeleton), 2003 (Men's bobsleigh), 2009, 2012
- FIL World Luge Championships: 1983, 2009
