= Ernest Yahin =

Russian Nordic combined skier (born 1991)

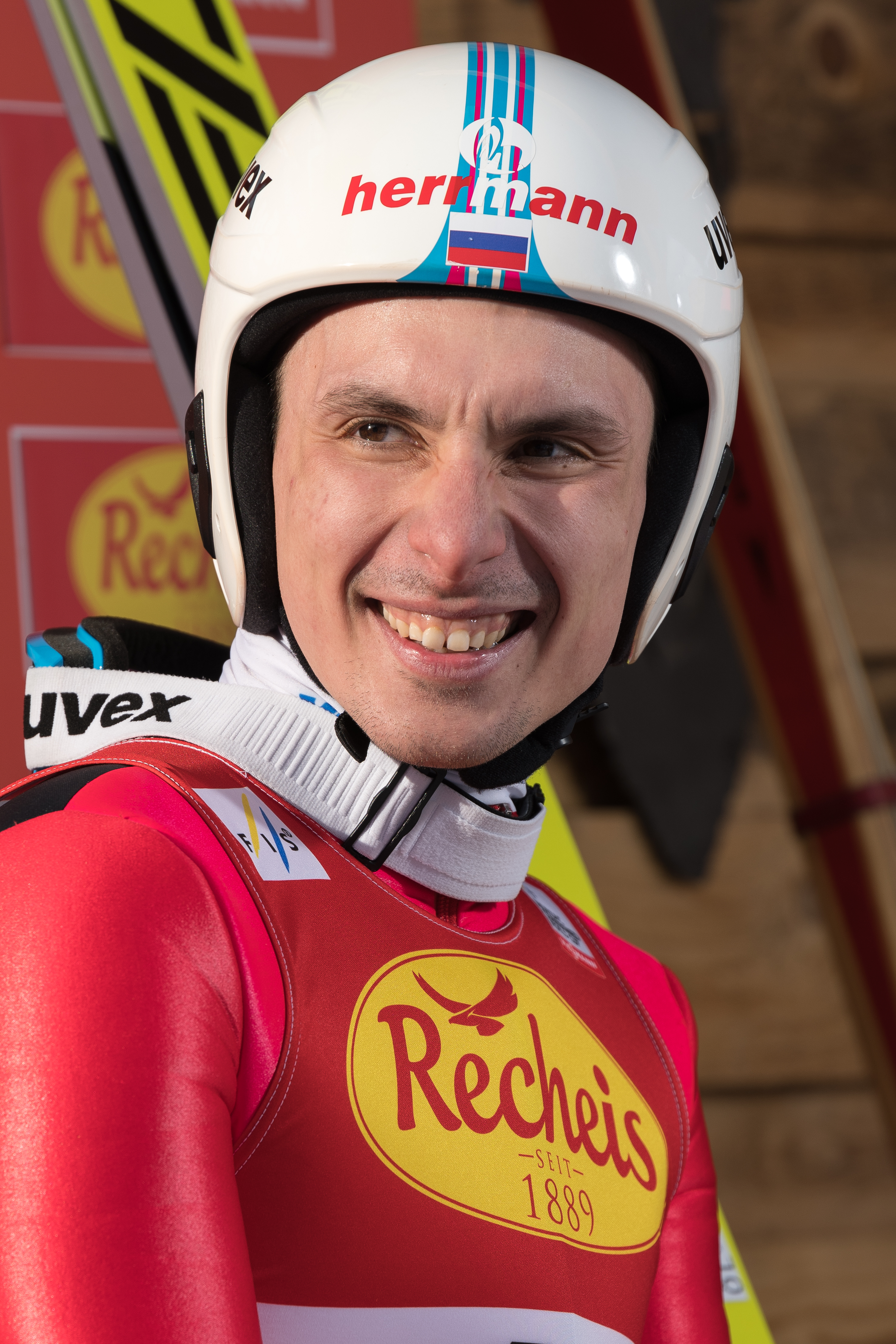
- Ernest Yahin, FIS Worldcup Nordic Combined Seefeld 2018.

Personal information
- Full name: Ernest Robertovich Yahin
- Nationality: Russia
- Born: 9 January 1991 Ufa, Russian SSR, Soviet Union (now Russia)
- Height: 1.78 m (5 ft 10 in)

Sport
- Sport: Skiing
Medal record
Nordic combined
Representing Russia
Winter Universiade
Bronze medal – third place	2015 Štrbské Pleso	Team normal hill

Ernest Robertovich Yahin (Russian: Эрнест Робертович Яхин; born 9 January 1991 in Ufa) is a Russian Nordic combined skier.

== Career ==
Yahin competed at the 2014 Winter Olympics for Russia. He placed 9th as a member of the Nordic Combined team event.

As of September 2014, his best showing at the World Championships is 12th, in the 2013 team event. His best individual finish is 41st, in the 2013 large hill event.

Yahin made his World Cup debut in January 2012. As of September 2014, his best finish is 8th, in a pair of team events. His best individual finish is 33rd, in a pair of large hill events in 2011–12.
