= Alfred Vincelette =

American Nordic combined skier

Personal information
- Born: June 11, 1935 West Point, New York, United States
- Died: 7 January 1997 (aged 61) Sun Valley, Idaho, United States

Sport
- Sport: Nordic combined

Alfred Vincelette (June 11, 1935 – January 7, 1997) was an American skier. He competed in the Nordic combined event at the 1960 Winter Olympics.
