= Pat Ahern (skier) =

American Nordic combined skier (born 1960)

Personal information
- Full name: Patrick Lee Ahern
- Nationality: United States
- Born: November 10, 1960 (age 65) Davenport, Iowa, U.S.
- Height: 1.83 m (6 ft 0 in)
- Weight: 73 kg (161 lb)

Sport
- Sport: Nordic combined

Patrick "Pat" Lee Ahern (born November 10, 1960) is an American Nordic combined skier. He competed in the 1984 Winter Olympics.

Ahern, who lived in Breckenridge, Colorado, lost an opportunity to win a gold medal “when controversial rulings by the jury canceled two rounds of jumping and wiped out his jumps, two of the longest of the competition.”

He attended University of Alaska Anchorage.
