= Adam Loomis =

American Nordic combined skier and ultramarathon runner (born 1992)

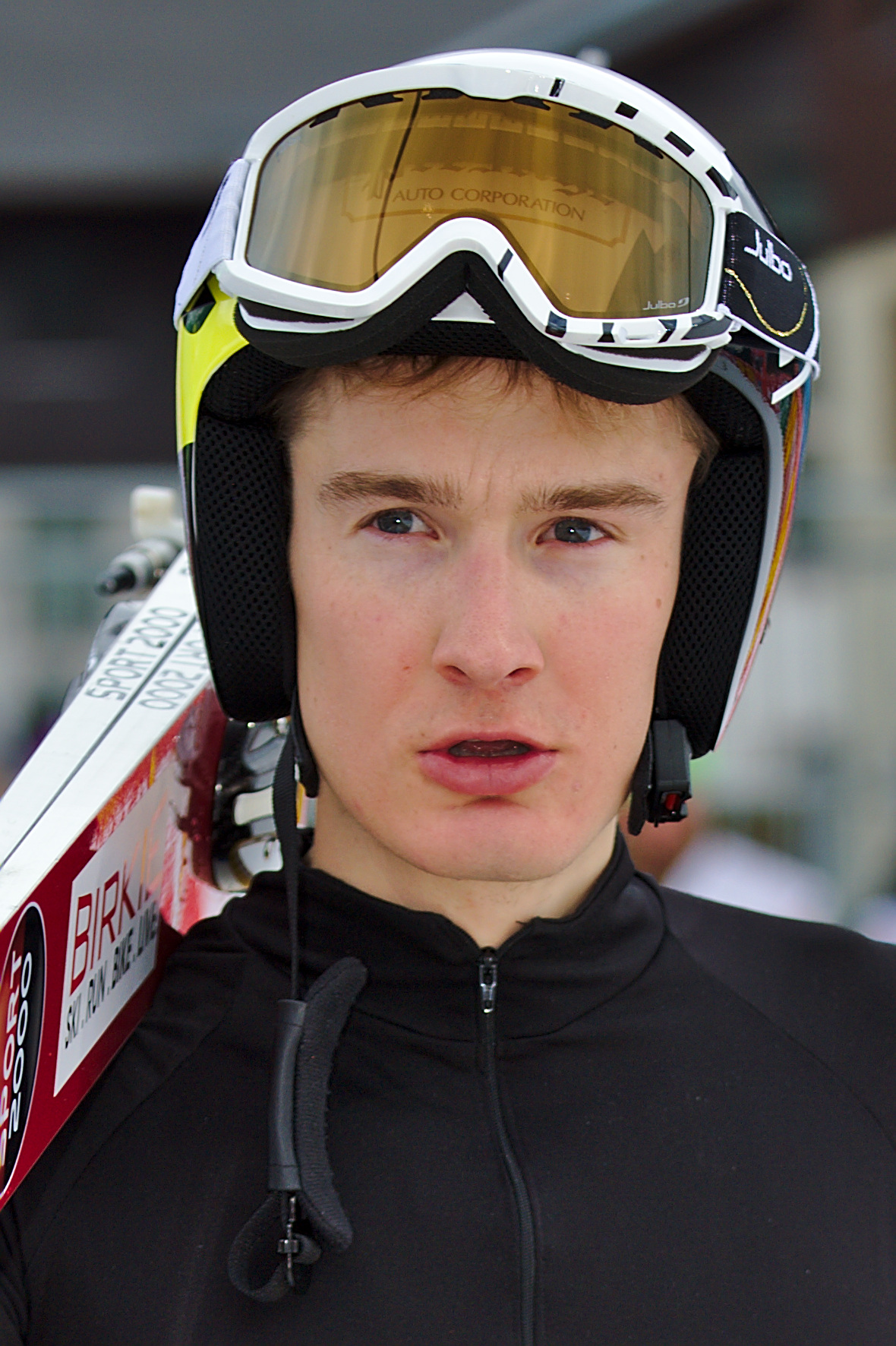

Personal information
- Full name: Adam Loomis
- Nationality: United States
- Born: March 19, 1992 (age 34) Eau Claire, Wisconsin, U.S.

Sport
- Sport: Skiing
- Club: Flying Eagles

Adam Loomis (born March 19, 1992) is a retired American Nordic combined skier and current professional ultramarathon runner. He was born in Eau Claire, Wisconsin. He competed for the US Nordic Combined Team for 7 seasons.

He represented US at the FIS Nordic World Ski Championships 2015 in Falun and Lahti in 2017.

Other notable athlete feats include previously holding the fastest known time on the Wasatch Ultimate Ridge Linkup (Utah). His record was set on 16 September 2018 with a time of 15 hours 59 minutes.

Loomis continues as a multi-sport athlete living in Park City, Utah, where he coaches Nordic combined skiing, ski mountaineering, and ski jumping. He competes in ultramarathon and skimo races professionally. He is a sponsored athlete for Arcteryx.

== Notable race results ==
2025 Notable Results
| Place | Race | Distance | Location |
|---|---|---|---|
| 1st | Twisted Fork Trail Festival | 68 KM | (United States) Park City, Utah |
| 2nd | Salt Lake Foothills Trail Races | 50 KM | (United States) Salt Lake City, Utah |
| 3rd | Gorge Waterfalls | 50 KM | (United States) Cascade Locks, Oregon |

2024 Notable Results
| Place | Race | Distance | Location |
|---|---|---|---|
| 2nd | Run Rabbit Run | 100M | (United States) Steamboat Springs, Colorado |
| 1st | Tushars Mountain Runs | 100 KM | (United States) Beaver, Utah |
| 5th | Meet the Minotaur Skyrace | 33.5 KM | (Canada) Crowsnest Pass, Alberta |
| 1st | Gorge Waterfalls | 100 KM | (United States) Cascade Locks, Oregon |

2023 Notable Results
| Place | Race | Distance | Location |
|---|---|---|---|
| 2nd | Quad Dipsea | 28.4M | (United States) Mill Valley, California |
| 1st | DC Peaks 50 | 50M | (United States) Kaysville, Utah |
