= Lukas Runggaldier =

Italian Nordic combined skier (born 1987)

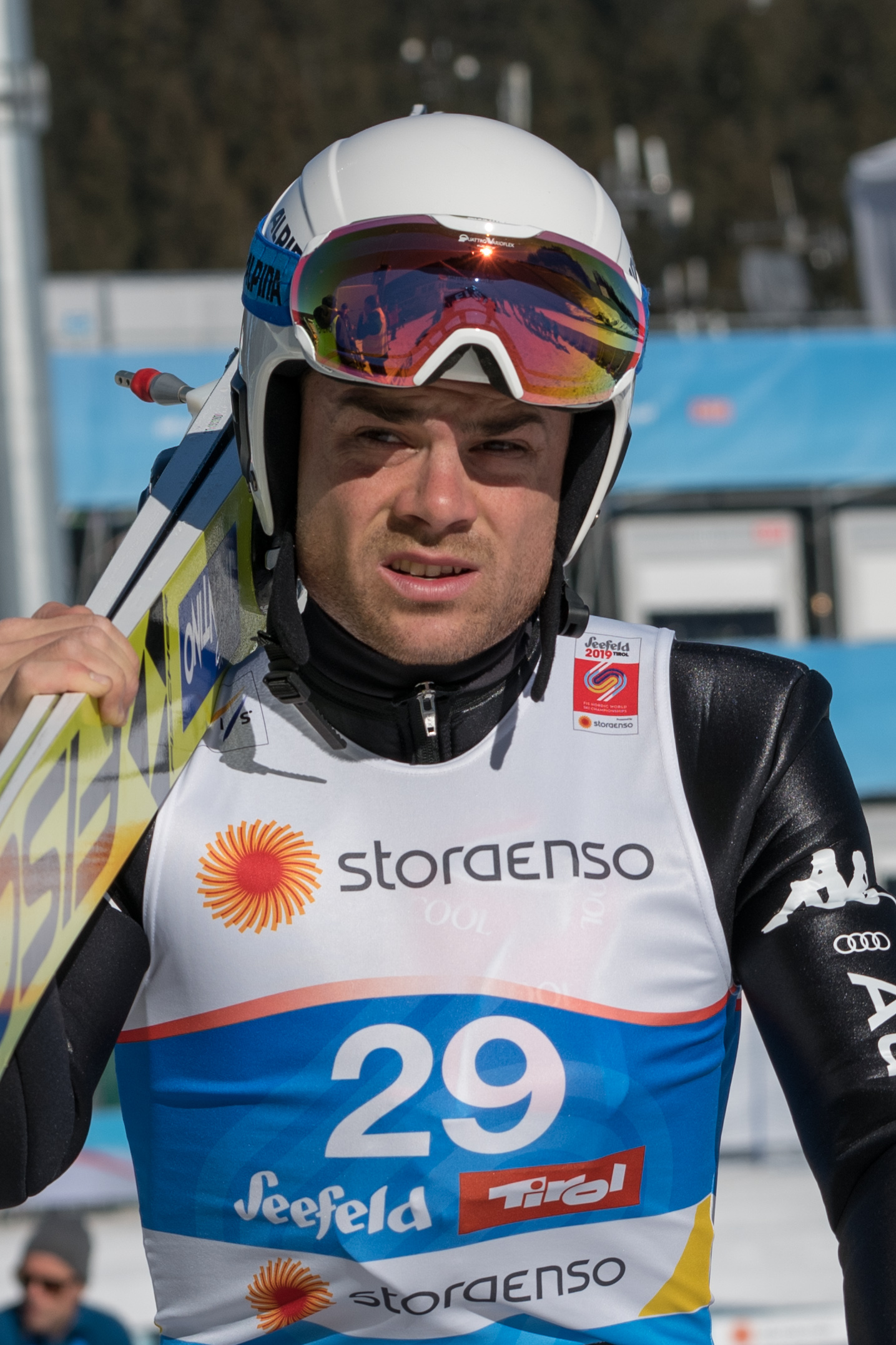

Personal information
- Born: 31 July 1987 (age 39) Bolzano, Italy

Sport
- Sport: Skiing
- Club: G.S. Fiamme Gialle

World Cup career
- Seasons: 2005–2020
- Indiv. starts: 97

Achievements and titles
- Personal bests: 4th (World Cup); 8th (World Champs); 7th (Olympics)

Lukas Runggaldier (born 31 July 1987) is a retired Italian Nordic combined skier who has competed between 2005 and 2020. At the 2010 Winter Olympics, he finished tenth in the 4 x 5 km team event, 11th in the 10 km individual large hill, and 16th in the 10 km individual normal hill event.

== Biography ==
At the FIS Nordic World Ski Championships 2011 in Oslo, Runggaldier finished 10th in the 10 km individual normal hill and 8th in the individual large hill. His best World Cup finish was 4th, first in a 10 km individual normal hill event at Seefeld (Austria) in January 2011, and in another 10 km race in Chaux-Neuve (France) one year later. In Sochi he finished 7th in the Gunderson individual normal hill.

Further notable results

- 2008: 1st, Italian championships of Nordic combined skiing
- 2010: 2nd, Italian championships of Nordic combined skiing, sprint

Runggaldier speaks Italian, Ladin, German, and English.
