= Bill Demong =

US Nordic combined skier

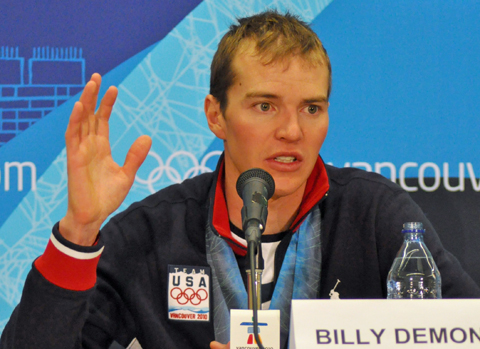
- Demong at a press conference after his victory in the 10 km individual large hill event at the 2010 Winter Olympics

Personal information
- Full name: William Demong
- Born: March 29, 1980 (age 46) Saranac Lake, New York, U.S.
Medal record
Men's Nordic combined
Representing the United States
Winter Olympics
Gold medal – first place	2010 Vancouver	10 km large hill
Silver medal – second place	2010 Vancouver	4x5 km team
World Championships
Gold medal – first place	2009 Liberec	10 km large hill
Silver medal – second place	2007 Sapporo	15 km gundersen
Bronze medal – third place	2009 Liberec	10 km normal hill
Bronze medal – third place	2013 Val di Flemme	Team normal hill

William Demong (born March 29, 1980, in Vermontville, New York) is an American former Nordic combined skier and Olympic gold medalist. Demong is a five-time Olympian, having competed in Nagano, Salt Lake City, Torino, Vancouver and Sochi.

== Career ==
Demong competed at the World Cup level starting in 1997.

His first World Cup victory came in 2002 in (Liberec, Czech Republic). Two more in 2007, (Lahti, Finland: March 9; Trondheim, Norway: December 8). He also has three victories in World Cup B events in the United States in 2004 and 2005 as well. In the 2008 season Bill had one victory in Ramsau am Dachstein in the 2008 season but his first real banner year occurred in 2009 when Bill racked up five World Cup victories and took third in the overall World Cup standings. Heading into the 2009–2010 season, Demong had nine World Cup victories and numerous top-tens.

At the 2002 Winter Olympics, in Salt Lake City, Demong placed fourth in the 4 × 5 km team event and 14th in the 7.5 km event.

Demong won a complete set of medals at the FIS Nordic World Ski Championships with a gold (10 km individual large hill: 2009), a silver (15 km individual: 2007), and a bronze (10 km individual normal hill: 2009).

Demong retired in 2015.

=== 2010 Winter Olympics ===
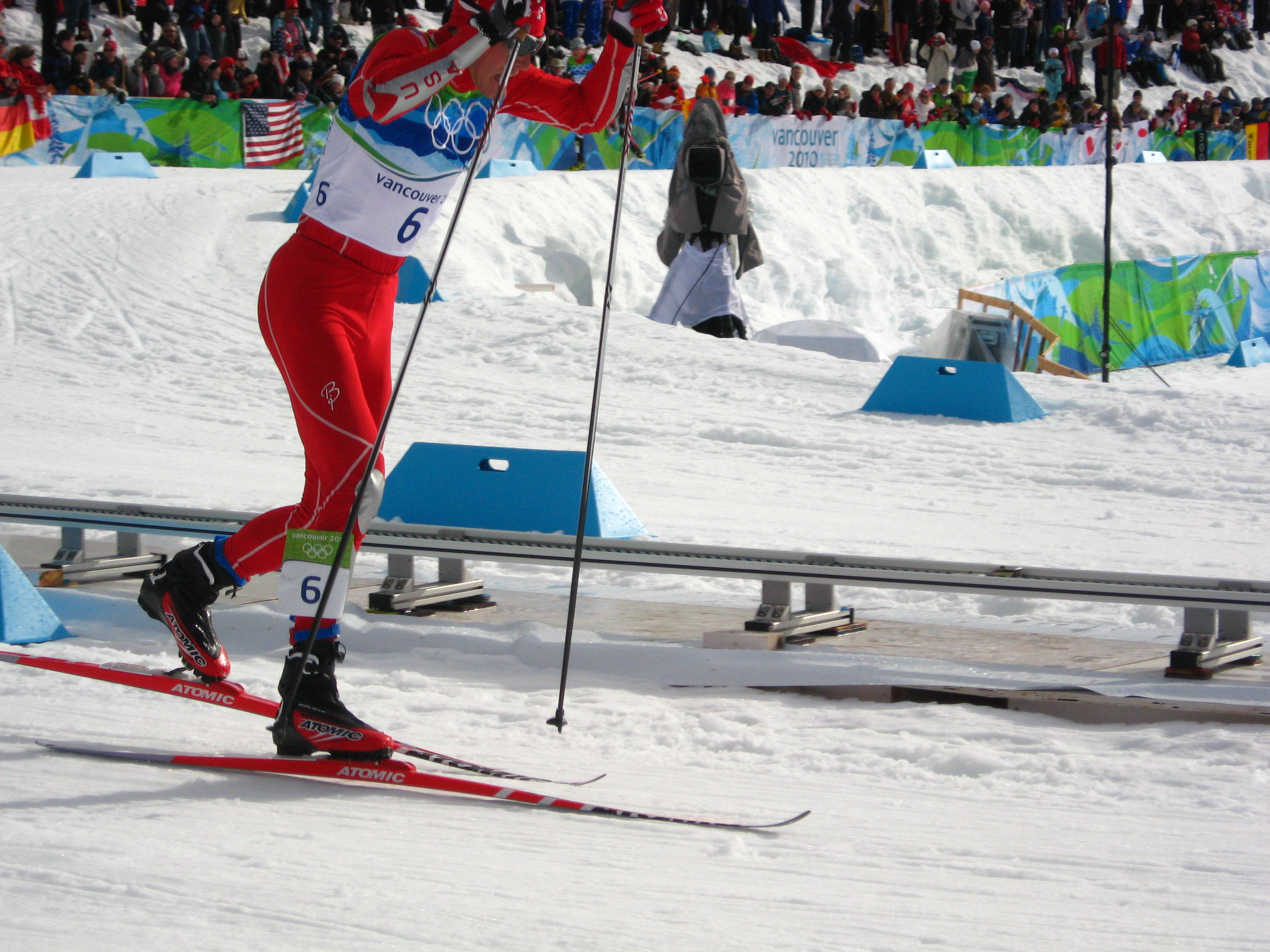
Bill Demong skating to victory in the 10 km individual large hill event at the 2010 Winter Olympics

Demong skied the final lap for the United States team consisting of Johnny Spillane, Todd Lodwick and Brett Camerota in the team large hill/4x5 km, winning the silver medal.

In the 10 km individual large hill, Demong won gold. Demong is the first American to win an Olympic gold medal in a nordic event.

After the medal ceremony held later that evening for the 10 km individual large hill event, Demong proposed to his girlfriend, Katie Koczynski, in front of teammates and coaches at the team headquarters near Vancouver. Koczynski said yes. Also on that same day, Demong found out he was named the flagbearer for the American team at the closing ceremony of the 2010 Winter Olympics on February 28. It was Demong's teammate, Spillane, who gave Demong the courage to propose to his future wife. Demong and his fiancée discussed how this happened on NBC's Today show the following morning. On July 11, 2010, Demong married Koczynski in Lake Placid, New York.

== Personal life ==
Demong learned to jump through the New York Ski Educational Foundation (NYSEF). He attended the National Sports Academy during high school, and competed in the Nagano Olympics during his senior year.

In 2009, Demong began appearing in Alka-Seltzer Plus television commercials as part of the medication's sponsorship of the U.S. Ski Team.

His mother is a Korean-American retired chorus teacher from Saranac Lake High School.
