= Brett Camerota =

American Nordic combined skier (born 1985)

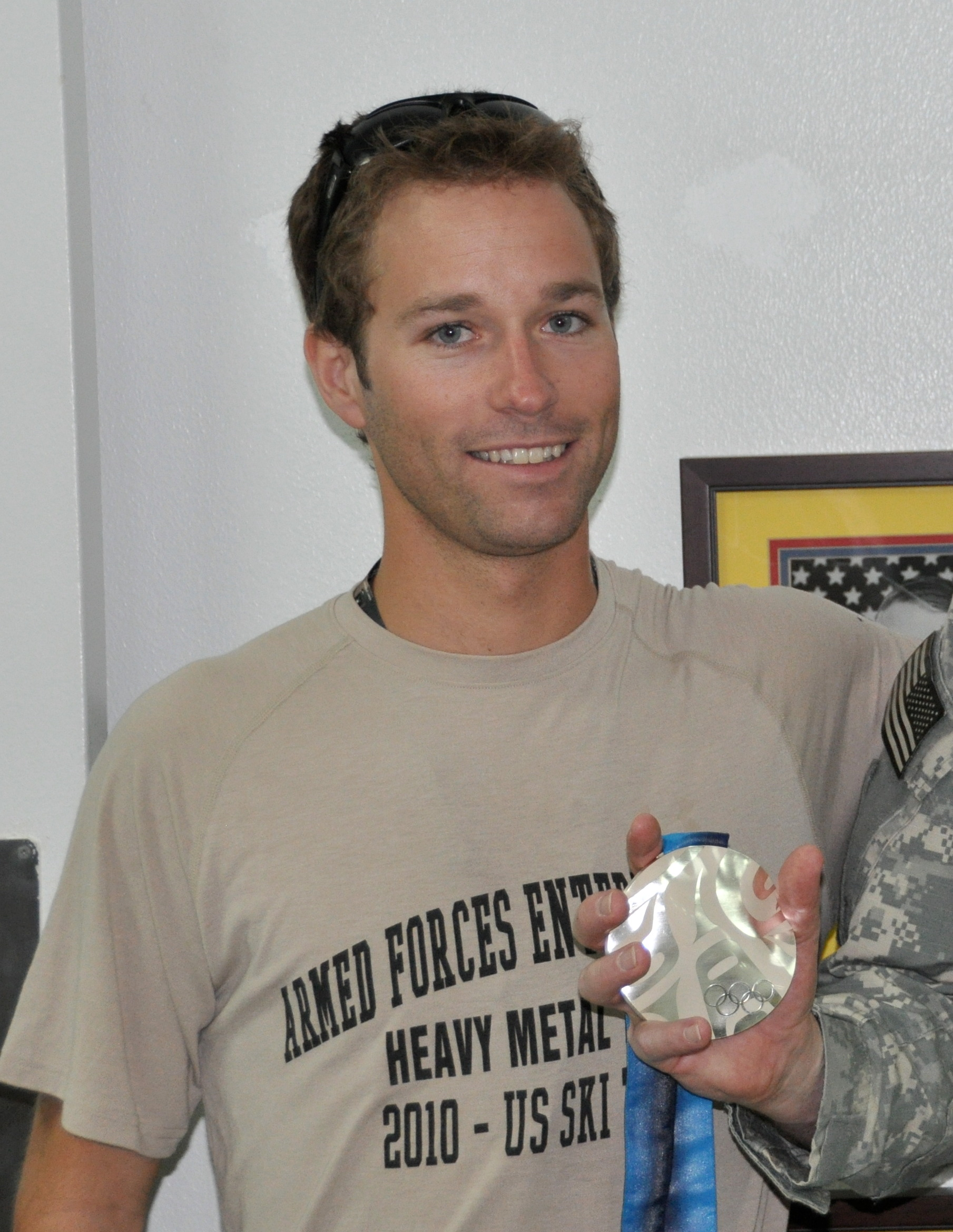
- Camerota in 2010

Personal information
- Born: January 9, 1985 (age 41)
- Height: 167 cm (5 ft 6 in)
- Weight: 59 kg (130 lb)

Sport
- Sport: Nordic combined
- Club: National Sports Foundation; Park City Nordic Ski Club; Westminster College
Medal record
Representing the United States
Winter Olympics
| Silver medal – second place | 2010 Vancouver | 4×5 km team |

Brett Camerota (born January 9, 1985) is an American Nordic combined skier. Competing at the 2006 and 2010 Winter Olympics, he won a silver medal in the 4×5 km team event in 2010, while his best individual finish was 36th place in the 10 km individual normal hill event at the same games. His best finish at the FIS Nordic World Ski Championships was 31st in the 15 km individual Gundersen event at Sapporo in 2007. His best individual World Cup finish was 9th in the HS 137/ 10 km event in Oberstdorf, Germany, in 2009. His twin brother, Eric Camerota, is also an Olympic Nordic combined skier.
