= Todd Lodwick =

American Nordic combined skier

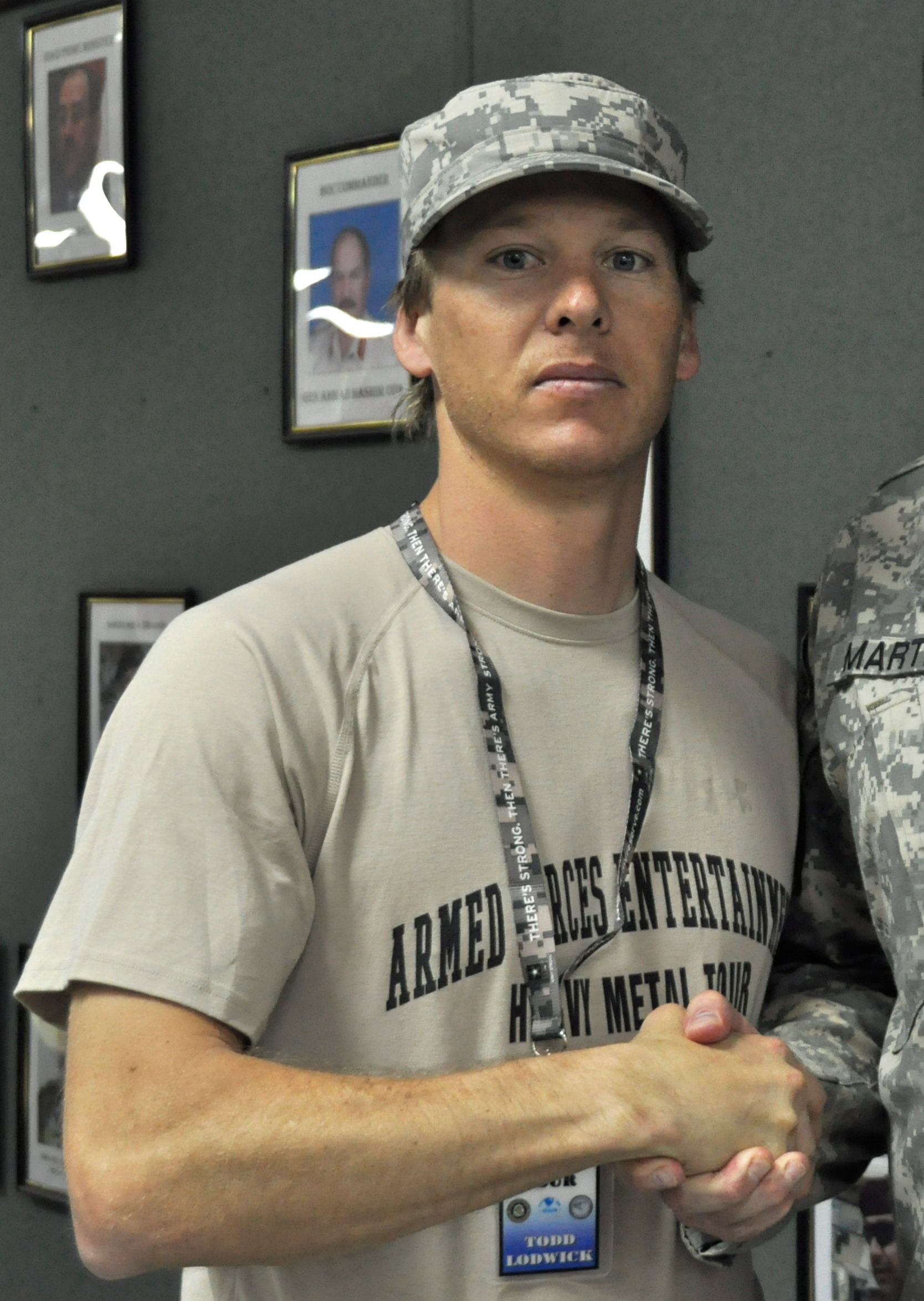
- Lodwick in 2010

Personal information
- Born: November 21, 1976 (age 49) Steamboat Springs, Colorado, U.S.
- Height: 5 ft 11 in (180 cm)

Sport
- Sport: Skiing
- Club: Steamboat Springs Winter Sports CLU

World Cup career
- Seasons: 1993–
- Indiv. podiums: 28
- Indiv. wins: 6
Medal record
Nordic combined
Representing the United States
Winter Olympics
Silver medal – second place	2010 Vancouver	4×5 km team
World Championships
Gold medal – first place	2009 Liberec	10 km mass start
Gold medal – first place	2009 Liberec	10 km normal hill
Bronze medal – third place	2013 Val di Flemme	Team normal hill

Todd Lodwick (born November 21, 1976) is an American Nordic combined skier. He competed at the 1994, 1998, 2002, 2006, 2010 and 2014 Olympics and won a team silver medal in 2010. His best individual result was fourth place in 2010, when he finished 0.7 seconds behind the third place in the individual normal hill/10 km event. At the world championships he won two individual gold medals in 2009.

== Professional career ==
Lodwick was born in Steamboat Springs, Colorado. During his international career, between 1993 and 2006, he participated in six World Championships, Four Winter Olympics and 162 World Cup events (placing in the top ten 108 times and the top six 74 times for a total of 28 World Cup podiums). His greatest successes have been 6 World Cup wins—including the 7.5 km sprint event at the 1998 Holmenkollen ski festival, where he was only the third American to win a medal at this event—and the gold medal at the 1996 Junior World Championships in Asiago, Italy. He finished in Top Ten of the World Cup overall standings eight consecutive years with a fourth place being his best result in the seasons 1997/98, 1999/2000 and 2004/05. Furthermore, Lodwick won 19 US-championships in Nordic skiing: 11 in Nordic combined and 8 in ski jumping. Despite competing on such a high level over a long period of time, he had not won a medal at a major event prior to his retirement in 2006.

Lodwick returned to competition in 2008, setting his sights on making the team for the 2010 Olympics. In February 2009 at the World Championships in Liberec, he won two gold medals in Nordic combined, earning them in the 10 km individual normal hill and the 10 km mass start events. In doing so he became the first person in Nordic combined history to win both the ski Jumping portion and cross country portion in the same event. At the 2010 Winter Olympics, he placed fourth in the individual normal hill/10 km event, 0.7 seconds behind the third place skier. Lodwick earned his first Olympic medal in the team competition.

On December 28, 2013, Todd qualified for the 2014 Olympic Games with a win at U.S. Olympic Team Trials for Nordic Combined in Park City, UT, making him the first six-time U.S. Winter Olympian. In February 2014 he was chosen by his teammates as the flag bearer for the 2014 Olympic games in Sochi.

== Personal life ==
Lodwick has two children and is an avid outdoorsman. Aside from skiing, he spends time golfing and bow hunting for wild game near his home in Colorado. His Team USA bio reads, "He’s a pro, whether on skis or on a hunt, which led him to partner with outdoor industry giant Mossy Oak camouflage." In competition Lodwick can usually be seen sporting his unique Mossy Oak camouflage helmet and gloves.

Olympic Games
Preceded by Mariel Zagunis	Flagbearer for United States; Sochi 2014	Succeeded by Michael Phelps
