= Bryan Fletcher (skier) =

American Nordic combined skier (born 1986)

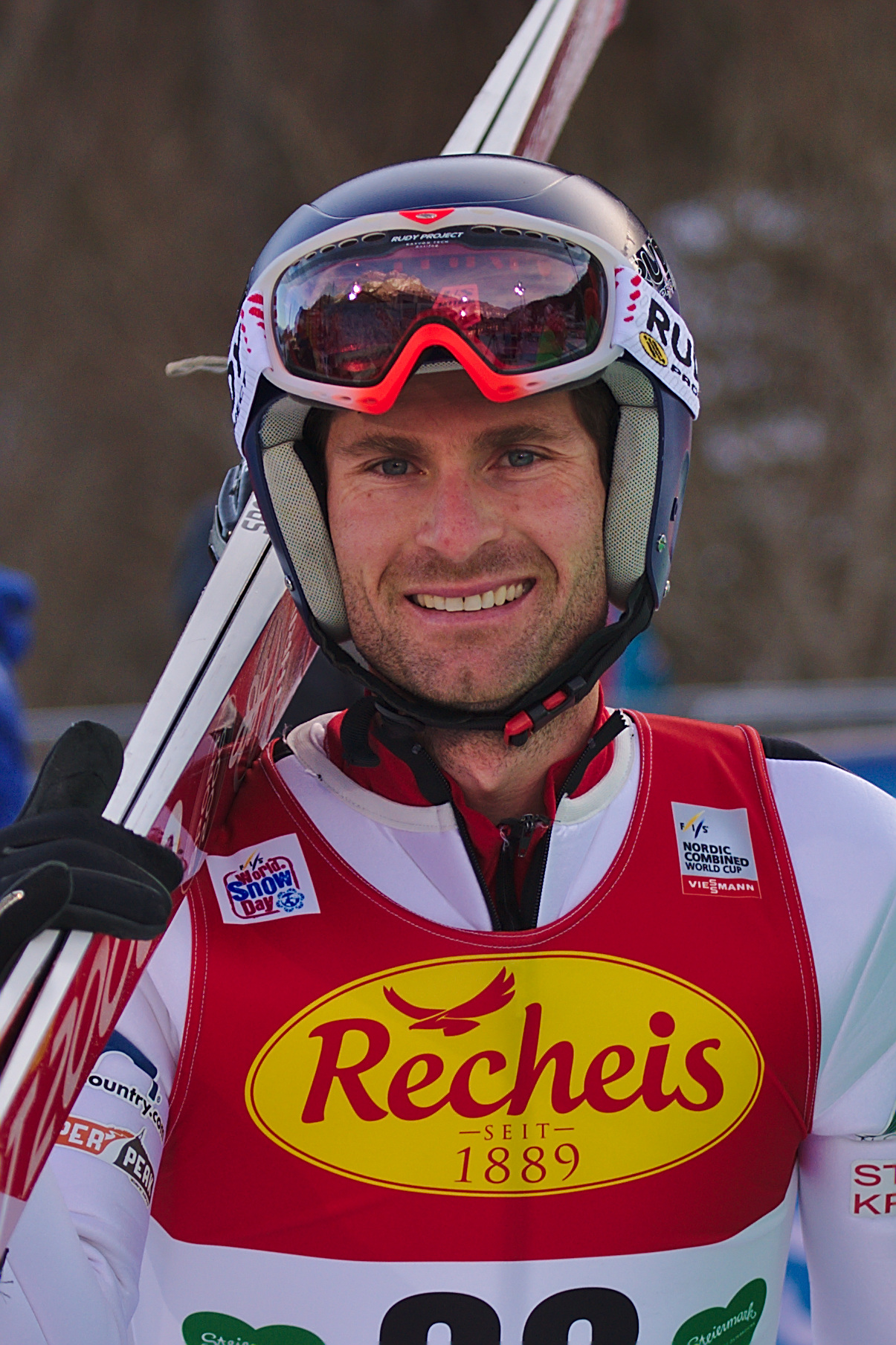

Personal information
- Nationality: United States
- Born: June 27, 1986 (age 40) Steamboat Springs, Colorado, U.S.

Sport
- Sport: Skiing
- Club: Steamboat Springs Winter Sports Club

World Cup career
- Seasons: 2009–2018
- Indiv. starts: 133
- Indiv. podiums: 2
- Indiv. wins: 1

Achievements and titles
- Personal best: 5th (World Champs)
Medal record
World Championships
Bronze medal – third place	2013 Val di Flemme	Team normal hill

Bryan Fletcher (born June 27, 1986, in Steamboat Springs, Colorado) is an American former Nordic combined skier who has competed between 2002 and 2018.

At the FIS Nordic World Ski Championships 2011 in Oslo, Fletcher finished 22nd in the 10 km individual normal hill and 40th in the individual large hill. His best finish at the World Championships is a fifth position, in 2015, in Falun, in the 10 km individual large hill.

He won a stage in the World Cup, in March 2012, in Oslo.

His brother is also a skier, Taylor Fletcher.
