= List of Olympic medalists in Nordic combined =

This is the complete list of Olympic medalists in Nordic combined.

== Men’s events ==
As with the ski jumping competitions, it is disputed whether the Olympic Games from 1924 to 1956 were held as normal hill or large hill competitions. At that time, the same hill (and therefore the same hill size) was used for the ski jumping competition and the Nordic combined competition.

=== 10 km individual normal hill ===
Known as the 18 km/ 15 km Individual Gundersen from 1924 to 2006, this event involved two jumps from the ski jumping normal hill. Since 2006, any one point difference between competitors in the ski jump represents 4 seconds between them at the start of the cross-country part of the competition. For the 2010 Winter Olympics in Vancouver, the event has been changed to only one jump from the ski jumping normal hill followed by 10 km of cross country skiing using the Gundersen system. Point-time differentials for previous Olympics are as follows: 1988–1992 – 1 pt = 6.7 seconds, 1994 – 1 pt = 6.5 seconds, 1998 – 1 pt = 6 seconds, 2002 – 1 pt = 5 seconds.

Games	Gold	Silver	Bronze
1924 Chamonix	Thorleif Haug; Norway	Thoralf Strømstad; Norway	Johan Grøttumsbråten; Norway
1928 St. Moritz	Johan Grøttumsbråten; Norway	Hans Vinjarengen; Norway	Jon Snersrud; Norway
1932 Lake Placid	Johan Grøttumsbråten (2); Norway	Ole Stenen; Norway	Hans Vinjarengen; Norway
1936 Garmisch-Partenkirchen	Oddbjørn Hagen; Norway	Olaf Hoffsbakken; Norway	Sverre Brodahl; Norway
1948 St. Moritz	Heikki Hasu; Finland	Martti Huhtala; Finland	Sven Israelsson; Sweden
1952 Oslo	Simon Slåttvik; Norway	Heikki Hasu; Finland	Sverre Stenersen; Norway
1956 Cortina d'Ampezzo	Sverre Stenersen; Norway	Bengt Eriksson; Sweden	Franciszek Gąsienica Groń; Poland
1960 Squaw Valley	Georg Thoma; United Team of Germany	Tormod Knutsen; Norway	Nikolay Gusakov; Soviet Union
1964 Innsbruck	Tormod Knutsen; Norway	Nikolay Kiselyov; Soviet Union	Georg Thoma; United Team of Germany
1968 Grenoble	Franz Keller; West Germany	Alois Kälin; Switzerland	Andreas Kunz; East Germany
1972 Sapporo	Ulrich Wehling; East Germany	Rauno Miettinen; Finland	Karl-Heinz Luck; East Germany
1976 Innsbruck	Ulrich Wehling; East Germany	Urban Hettich; West Germany	Konrad Winkler; East Germany
1980 Lake Placid	Ulrich Wehling (3); East Germany	Jouko Karjalainen; Finland	Konrad Winkler (2); East Germany
1984 Sarajevo	Tom Sandberg; Norway	Jouko Karjalainen (2); Finland	Jukka Ylipulli; Finland
1988 Calgary	Hippolyt Kempf; Switzerland	Klaus Sulzenbacher; Austria	Allar Levandi; Soviet Union
1992 Albertville	Fabrice Guy; France	Sylvain Guillaume; France	Klaus Sulzenbacher; Austria
1994 Lillehammer	Fred Børre Lundberg; Norway	Takanori Kōno; Japan	Bjarte Engen Vik; Norway
1998 Nagano	Bjarte Engen Vik; Norway	Samppa Lajunen; Finland	Valeri Stolyarov; Russia
2002 Salt Lake City	Samppa Lajunen; Finland	Jaakko Tallus; Finland	Felix Gottwald; Austria
2006 Turin	Georg Hettich; Germany	Felix Gottwald; Austria	Magnus Moan; Norway
2010 Vancouver	Jason Lamy-Chappuis; France	Johnny Spillane; United States	Alessandro Pittin; Italy
2014 Sochi	Eric Frenzel; Germany	Akito Watabe; Japan	Magnus Krog; Norway
2018 Pyeongchang	Eric Frenzel (2); Germany	Akito Watabe (2); Japan	Lukas Klapfer; Austria
2022 Beijing	Vinzenz Geiger; Germany	Jørgen Graabak; Norway	Lukas Greiderer; Austria
2026 Milano Cortina	Jens Lurås Oftebro; Norway	Johannes Lamparter; Austria	Eero Hirvonen; Finland

- Medals:

Rank	Nation	Gold	Silver	Bronze	Total
1	Norway	11	6	8	25
2	Germany	9	1	5	15
3	Finland	2	7	2	11
4	France	2	1	-	3
5	Switzerland	1	1	-	2
6	Austria	-	3	4	7
7	Japan	-	3	-	3
8	Soviet Union	-	1	2	3
9	Sweden	-	1	1	2
10	United States	-	1	-	1
11	Italy	-	-	1	1
11	Poland	-	-	1	1
11	Russia	-	-	1	1

The 10 km individual normal hill is one of ten events that has been in every Winter Olympic Games.

=== 10 km individual large hill ===
Formerly known as the 7.5 km sprint, it consisted of only one jump from the large hill followined by 7.5 km of cross country skiing using the Gundersen system. Starting at the 2010 Winter Olympics, the cross country distance will be lengthened to 10 km. It follows the same point-time differential as the 10 km individual normal hill event.

Games	Gold	Silver	Bronze
2002 Salt Lake City	Samppa Lajunen; Finland	Ronny Ackermann; Germany	Felix Gottwald; Austria
2006 Turin	Felix Gottwald; Austria	Magnus Moan; Norway	Georg Hettich; Germany
2010 Vancouver	Bill Demong; United States	Johnny Spillane; United States	Bernhard Gruber; Austria
2014 Sochi	Jørgen Graabak; Norway	Magnus Moan; Norway	Fabian Rießle; Germany
2018 Pyeongchang	Johannes Rydzek; Germany	Fabian Rießle; Germany	Eric Frenzel; Germany
2022 Beijing	Jørgen Graabak; Norway	Jens Lurås Oftebro; Norway	Akito Watabe; Japan
2026 Milano Cortina	Jens Lurås Oftebro; Norway	Johannes Lamparter; Austria	Ilkka Herola; Finland

- Medals:

Rank	Nation	Gold	Silver	Bronze	Total
1	Norway	3	3	-	6
2	Germany	1	2	3	6
3	Austria	1	1	2	4
4	United States	1	1	-	2
5	Finland	1	-	1	2
6	Japan	-	-	1	1

=== 4 x 5 km team (3 x 10 km: 1988–94, 2 x 7.5 km: 2026) ===
This involves each team taking one jump from the ski jumping large hill. For each one point difference between teams at the ski jump, there are 1.33 seconds between them at the start of the cross country skiing part of the competition. Point-time differentials for previous Olympics are as follows: 1988–1994 – 1 pt = 5 seconds, 1998 – 1 pt = 3 seconds, 2002 – 1 pt = 1.5 seconds, 2006 – 1 pt = 1 second.

Games	Gold	Silver	Bronze
1988 Calgary	West Germany; Thomas Müller; Hans-Peter Pohl; Hubert Schwarz	Switzerland; Fredy Glanzmann; Hippolyt Kempf; Andreas Schaad	Austria; Hansjörg Aschenwald; Günther Csar; Klaus Sulzenbacher
1992 Albertville	Japan; Reiichi Mikata; Takanori Kōno; Kenji Ogiwara	Norway; Knut Tore Apeland; Fred Børre Lundberg; Trond Einar Elden	Austria; Klaus Ofner; Stefan Kreiner; Klaus Sulzenbacher
1994 Lillehammer	Japan; Takanori Kōno; Masashi Abe; Kenji Ogiwara	Norway; Knut Tore Apeland; Bjarte Engen Vik; Fred Børre Lundberg	Switzerland; Jean-Yves Cuendet; Hippolyt Kempf; Andreas Schaad
1998 Nagano	Norway; Halldor Skard; Kenneth Braaten; Bjarte Engen Vik; Fred Børre Lundberg	Finland; Samppa Lajunen; Jari Mantila; Tapio Nurmela; Hannu Manninen	France; Sylvain Guillaume; Nicolas Bal; Ludovic Roux; Fabrice Guy
2002 Salt Lake City	Finland; Jari Mantila; Hannu Manninen; Jaakko Tallus; Samppa Lajunen	Germany; Björn Kircheisen; Georg Hettich; Marcel Höhlig; Ronny Ackermann	Austria; Christoph Bieler; Michael Gruber; Mario Stecher; Felix Gottwald
2006 Turin	Austria; Michael Gruber; Christoph Bieler; Felix Gottwald; Mario Stecher	Germany; Björn Kircheisen; Georg Hettich; Ronny Ackermann; Jens Gaiser	Finland; Antti Kuisma; Anssi Koivuranta; Jaakko Tallus; Hannu Manninen
2010 Vancouver	Austria; Bernhard Gruber; Felix Gottwald; Mario Stecher; David Kreiner	United States; Brett Camerota; Todd Lodwick; Johnny Spillane; Bill Demong	Germany; Johannes Rydzek; Tino Edelmann; Eric Frenzel; Björn Kircheisen
2014 Sochi	Norway; Jørgen Graabak; Håvard Klemetsen; Magnus Krog; Magnus Moan	Germany; Eric Frenzel; Björn Kircheisen; Fabian Rießle; Johannes Rydzek	Austria; Christoph Bieler; Bernhard Gruber; Lukas Klapfer; Mario Stecher
2018 Pyeongchang	Germany; Vinzenz Geiger; Fabian Rießle; Eric Frenzel; Johannes Rydzek	Norway; Jan Schmid; Espen Andersen; Jarl Magnus Riiber; Jørgen Graabak	Austria; Wilhelm Denifl; Lukas Klapfer; Bernhard Gruber; Mario Seidl
2022 Beijing	Norway; Espen Bjørnstad; Espen Andersen; Jens Lurås Oftebro; Jørgen Graabak	Germany; Manuel Faißt; Julian Schmid; Eric Frenzel; Vinzenz Geiger	Japan; Yoshito Watabe; Hideaki Nagai; Akito Watabe; Ryota Yamamoto
2026 Milano Cortina	Norway; Andreas Skoglund; Jens Lurås Oftebro	Finland; Ilkka Herola; Eero Hirvonen	Austria; Stefan Rettenegger; Johannes Lamparter

- Medals:

Rank	Nation	Gold	Silver	Bronze	Total
1	Norway	3	3	-	6
2	Austria	2	-	5	7
3	Japan	2	-	1	3
4	Germany	1	4	1	6
5	Finland	1	1	1	3
6	West Germany	1	-	-	1
7	Switzerland	-	1	1	2
8	United States	-	1	-	1
9	France	-	-	1	1

== Statistics ==
=== Athlete medal leaders ===
Three or more Olympic medals in Nordic combined:

Athlete	Nation	Medal years	Gold	Silver	Bronze	Total
Eric Frenzel	Germany	2010–2022	3	2	2	7
Felix Gottwald	Austria	2002–2010	3	1	3	7
Jørgen Graabak	Norway	2014–2022	4	2	0	6
Samppa Lajunen	Finland	1998–2002	3	2	0	5
Fred Børre Lundberg	Norway	1992–1998	2	2	0	4
Bjarte Engen Vik	Norway	1994–1998	2	1	1	4
Johannes Rydzek	Germany	2010–2018	2	1	1	4
Mario Stecher	Austria	2006–2014	2	0	2	4
Georg Hettich	Germany	2002–2006	1	2	1	4
Magnus Moan	Norway	2006, 2014	1	2	1	4
Fabian Rießle	Germany	2014–2018	1	2	1	4
Bernhard Gruber	Austria	2010–2018	1	0	3	4
Björn Kircheisen	Germany	2002–2014	0	3	1	4
Akito Watabe	Japan	2014–2022	0	2	2	4
Klaus Sulzenbacher	Austria	1988–1992	0	1	3	4
Ulrich Wehling	Germany	1972–1980	3	0	0	3
Takanori Kono	Japan	1992–1994	2	1	0	3
Vinzenz Geiger	Germany	2018–2022	2	1	0	3
Johan Grøttumsbråten	Norway	1924–1932	2	0	1	3
Hannu Manninen	Finland	1998–2006	1	1	1	3
Hippolyt Kempf	Switzerland	1988, 1994	1	1	1	3
Jaakko Tallus	Finland	2002–2006	1	1	1	3
Christoph Bieler	Austria	2002–2006, 2014	1	0	2	3
Johnny Spillane	United States	2010	0	3	0	3
Ronny Ackermann	Germany	2002–2006	0	3	0	3
Lukas Klapfer	Austria	2014–2018	0	0	3	3

=== Medals per year ===
×	NOC did not exist or did not participate	#	Number of medals won by the NOC	–	NOC did not win any medals

NOC	24	28	32	36	48	52	56	60	64	68	72	76	80	84	88	92	94	98	02	06	10	14	18	22	Total
Austria	–	–	–	–	–	–	–	–	–	–	–	–	–	–	2	2	–	–	3	3	2	1	2	1	16
Finland	–	–	–	–	2	1	–	–	–	–	1	–	1	2	–	–	–	2	4	1	–	–	–	–	14
France	–	–	–	–	–	–	–	–	–	–	–	–	–	–	–	2	–	1	–	–	1	–	–	–	4
Germany	×	–	–	–	×	–	×	×	×	×	×	×	×	×	×	–	–	–	2	3	1	3	5	2	16
United Team of Germany	×	×	×	×	×	×	–	1	1	×	×	×	×	×	×	×	×	×	×	×	×	×	×	×	2
East Germany	×	×	×	×	×	×	×	×	×	1	2	2	2	–	–	×	×	×	×	×	×	×	×	×	7
West Germany	×	×	×	×	×	×	×	×	×	1	–	1	–	–	1	×	×	×	×	×	×	×	×	×	3
Italy	–	–	–	–	–	–	–	–	–	–	–	–	–	–	–	–	–	–	–	–	1	–	–	–	1
Japan	×	–	–	–	×	–	–	–	–	–	–	–	–	–	–	1	2	–	–	–	–	1	1	2	7
Norway	3	3	3	3	–	2	1	1	1	–	–	–	–	1	–	1	3	2	–	2	–	4	1	4	35
Poland	–	–	–	–	–	–	1	–	–	–	–	–	–	–	–	–	–	–	–	–	–	–	–	–	1
Soviet Union	×	×	×	×	×	×	–	1	1	–	–	–	–	–	1	×	×	×	×	×	×	×	×	×	3
Russia	×	×	×	×	×	×	×	×	×	×	×	×	×	×	×	×	–	1	–	–	–	–	×	×	1
Sweden	–	–	–	–	1	–	1	–	–	–	–	–	–	–	–	–	–	–	–	–	–	–	–	–	2
Switzerland	–	–	–	–	–	–	–	–	–	1	–	–	–	–	2	–	1	–	–	–	–	–	–	–	4
United States	–	–	–	–	–	–	–	–	–	–	–	–	–	–	–	–	–	–	–	–	4	–	–	–	4

=== Medal sweep events ===
These are events in which athletes from one NOC won all three medals.

Games	Event	NOC	Gold	Silver	Bronze
1924 Chamonix	Normal Hill *	Norway	Thorleif Haug	Thoralf Strømstad	Johan Grøttumsbråten
1928 St. Moritz	Normal Hill	Norway	Johan Grøttumsbråten	Hans Vinjarengen	Jon Snersrud
1932 Lake Placid	Normal Hill *	Norway	Johan Grøttumsbråten	Ole Stenen	Hans Vinjarengen
1936 Garmisch-Partenkirchen	Normal Hill	Norway	Oddbjørn Hagen	Olaf Hoffsbakken	Sverre Brodahl
2018 Pyeongchang	Large Hill	Germany	Johannes Rydzek	Fabian Rießle	Eric Frenzel

- ^{*} In addition to sweeping the podium, the country also had the fourth-place finisher.

== See also ==
- List of FIS Nordic World Ski Championships medalists in Nordic combined
