= 2002–03 FIS Nordic Combined World Cup =

International skiing competition

Nordic Combined World Cup 2002/03
Winners
- Overall: (Germany) Ronny Ackermann
- Sprint: (Germany) Ronny Ackermann
- Warsteiner Grand Prix: (Austria) Felix Gottwald
- Nations Cup: Germany

Competitions
- Venues: 14
- Individual: 15
- Cancelled: 1

The 2002/03 FIS Nordic Combined World Cup was the 20th world cup season, a combination of ski jumping and cross-country skiing organized by FIS. It started on 29 Nov 2002 in Kuusamo, Finland and ended on 15 March 2003 in Lahti, Finland.

== Calendar ==
=== Men ===
Num	Season	Date	Place	Hill	Discipline	Winner	Second	Third
207	1	29 November 2002	(Finland) Kuusamo	Rukatunturi	K120 / 7.5 km (Sprint)	(Finland) Hannu Manninen	(Germany) Ronny Ackermann	(Germany) Björn Kircheisen
		1 December 2002	(Finland) Kuusamo	Rukatunturi	K120 / 7.5 km (Sprint)	cancelled		
208	2	6 December 2002	(Norway) Trondheim	Granåsen	K120 / 7.5 km (Sprint)	(Germany) Björn Kircheisen	(United States) Johnny Spillane	(Germany) Georg Hettich
209	3	7 December 2002	(Norway) Trondheim	Granåsen	K120 / 15 km	(Germany) Björn Kircheisen	(Germany) Georg Hettich	(United States) Johnny Spillane
210	4	8 December 2002	(Norway) Trondheim	Granåsen	K120 / 7.5 km (Sprint)	(Germany) Björn Kircheisen	(Germany) Ronny Ackermann	(United States) Johnny Spillane
211	5	14 December 2002	(Czech Republic) Harrachov	Čerťák	K90 / 15 km	(Finland) Samppa Lajunen	(Finland) Hannu Manninen	(Germany) Björn Kircheisen
212	6	15 December 2002	(Czech Republic) Harrachov	Čerťák	K90 / 7.5 km (Sprint)	(Finland) Hannu Manninen	(Finland) Samppa Lajunen	(Germany) Ronny Ackermann
		31 December 2002	(Germany) Oberhof	Hans-Renner-Schanze	K120 / 7.5 km (Sprint)	rescheduled to 1 January		
213	7	1 January 2003	(Germany) Oberhof	Hans-Renner-Schanze	K120 / 7.5 km (Sprint)	(Austria) Felix Gottwald	(Germany) Ronny Ackermann	(Austria) Mario Stecher
2nd Warsteiner Grand Prix Overall (1 January 2003)						(Austria) Felix Gottwald	(Germany) Ronny Ackermann	(Austria) Mario Stecher
214	8	8 January 2003	(Austria) Ramsau	W90-Mattensprunganlage	K90 / 7.5 km (Sprint)	(Finland) Samppa Lajunen	(Germany) Ronny Ackermann	(Finland) Hannu Manninen
215	9	12 January 2003	(France) Chaux-Neuve	La Côté Feuillée	K90 / 15 km	(Austria) Felix Gottwald	(Germany) Ronny Ackermann	(United States) Todd Lodwick
216	10	22 January 2003	(Japan) Hakuba	Olympic Hills	K120 / 15 km	(Germany) Ronny Ackermann	(Finland) Hannu Manninen	(Germany) Georg Hettich
217	11	25 January 2003	(Japan) Sapporo	Ōkurayama	10 km (Mass) / K120	(Germany) Ronny Ackermann	(Germany) Georg Hettich	(Finland) Samppa Lajunen
FIS Nordic World Ski Championships 2003
218	12	8 March 2003	(Norway) Oslo	Holmenkollbakken	K115 / 7.5 km (Sprint)	(Austria) Felix Gottwald	(Germany) Ronny Ackermann	(Norway) Ola Morten Græsli (Germany) Björn Kircheisen
219	13	9 March 2003	(Norway) Oslo	Holmenkollbakken	K115 / 7.5 km (Sprint)	(Germany) Ronny Ackermann	(Austria) Felix Gottwald	(Norway) Ola Morten Græsli
220	14	14 March 2003	(Finland) Lahti	Salpausselkä	K116 / 15 km	(Germany) Ronny Ackermann	(Austria) Felix Gottwald	(Finland) Jouni Kaitainen
221	15	15 March 2003	(Finland) Lahti	Salpausselkä	K116 / 7.5 km (Sprint)	(Austria) Felix Gottwald	(Norway) Kenneth Braaten	(Germany) Ronny Ackermann

== Standings ==
=== Overall ===
Rank		Points
1	(Germany) Ronny Ackermann	1135
2	(Austria) Felix Gottwald	790
3	(Germany) Björn Kircheisen	756
4	(Finland) Hannu Manninen	678
5	(Finland) Samppa Lajunen	629
6	(Germany) Georg Hettich	592
7	(United States) Johnny Spillane	511
8	(Norway) Kenneth Braaten	414
9	(United States) Todd Lodwick	374
10	(Norway) Kristian Hammer	345

- Standings after 15 events.

=== Sprint ===
Rank		Points
1	(Germany) Ronny Ackermann	770
2	(Austria) Felix Gottwald	548
3	(Germany) Björn Kircheisen	528
4	(Finland) Hannu Manninen	484
5	(Finland) Samppa Lajunen	371
6	(United States) Johnny Spillane	357
7	(Germany) Georg Hettich	347
8	(Norway) Petter Tande	275
9	(Norway) Kristian Hammer	237
10	(United States) Todd Lodwick	222

- Standings after 9 events.

=== Warsteiner Grand Prix ===
Rank		Points
1	(Austria) Felix Gottwald	100
2	(Germany) Ronny Ackermann	80
3	(Austria) Mario Stecher	60
4	(Finland) Samppa Lajunen	50
5	(Germany) Björn Kircheisen	45
6	(United States) Todd Lodwick	40
7	(Finland) Jaakko Tallus	36
8	(Finland) Jouni Kaitainen	32
9	(Norway) Kristian Hammer	29
10	(Germany) Sebastian Haseney	26

- Standings after 1 event.

=== Nations Cup ===
Rank		Points
1	Germany	2950
2	Austria	1899
3	Finland	1861
4	Norway	1313
5	United States	885
6	France	548
7	Japan	289
8	Switzerland	146
9	Slovenia	7

- Standings after 15 events.
