= 2001–02 FIS Nordic Combined World Cup =

International skiing competition

Nordic Combined World Cup 2001/02
Winners
- Overall: (Germany) Ronny Ackermann
- Sprint: (Germany) Ronny Ackermann
- Warsteiner Grand Prix: (Austria) Felix Gottwald
- Nations Cup: Germany

Competitions
- Venues: 14
- Individual: 19
- Team: 1
- Cancelled: 2

The 2001/02 FIS Nordic Combined World Cup was the 19th world cup season, a combination of ski jumping and cross-country skiing organized by FIS. It started on 23 Nov 2001 in Kuopio, Finland and ended on 16 March 2002 in Oslo, Norway.

== Calendar ==
=== Men ===
Num	Season	Date	Place	Hill	Discipline	Winner	Second	Third
188	1	23 November 2001	(Finland) Kuopio	Puijo	K120 / 15 km	(Germany) Ronny Ackermann	(Germany) Björn Kircheisen	(Norway) Kristian Hammer
189	2	25 November 2001	(Finland) Kuopio	Puijo	K120 / 7.5 km (Sprint)	(Germany) Ronny Ackermann	(Finland) Hannu Manninen	(Norway) Kristian Hammer
190	3	2 December 2001	(Norway) Lillehammer	Lysgårdsbakken	K120 / 15 km	(United States) Todd Lodwick	(Austria) Felix Gottwald	(Norway) Preben Fjære Brynemo
191	4	7 December 2001	(Poland) Zakopane	Wielka Krokiew	K120 / 15 km (Mass)	(Austria) Felix Gottwald	(Germany) Ronny Ackermann	(Finland) Samppa Lajunen
192	5	9 December 2001	(Slovakia) Štrbské Pleso	MS 1970 B	K90 / 7.5 km (Sprint)	(Finland) Samppa Lajunen	(Germany) Ronny Ackermann	(Austria) Felix Gottwald
193	6	16 December 2001	(United States) Steamboat Springs	Howelsen Hill	K90 / 15 km	(Austria) Felix Gottwald	(United States) Todd Lodwick	(Germany) Ronny Ackermann
194	7	18 December 2001	(United States) Steamboat Springs	Howelsen Hill	K120 / 7.5 km (Sprint)	(Germany) Ronny Ackermann	(Finland) Samppa Lajunen	(Austria) Felix Gottwald
195	8	29 December 2001	(Germany) Oberwiesenthal	Fichtelbergschanzen	K95 / 7.5 km (Sprint)	(Austria) Felix Gottwald	(Germany) Ronny Ackermann	(Austria) Mario Stecher
196	9	3 January 2002	(Germany) Reit im Winkl	Franz-Haslberger-Schanze	K90 / 7.5 km (Sprint)	(Germany) Ronny Ackermann	(Austria) Felix Gottwald	(Finland) Samppa Lajunen
197	10	5 January 2002	(Germany) Schonach	Langenwaldschanze	K90 / 15 km	(Austria) Felix Gottwald	(Finland) Samppa Lajunen	(Germany) Ronny Ackermann
1st Warsteiner Grand Prix Overall (29 December 2001 - 5 January 2002)						(Austria) Felix Gottwald	(Germany) Ronny Ackermann	(Finland) Samppa Lajunen
198	11	11 January 2002	(Italy) Val di Fiemme	Trampolino dal Ben	K120 / 7.5 km (Sprint)	(Austria) Felix Gottwald	(Germany) Ronny Ackermann	(Germany) Björn Kircheisen
199	12	13 January 2002	(Austria) Ramsau	W90-Mattensprunganlage	15 km (Mass) / K90	(Austria) Felix Gottwald	(Finland) Samppa Lajunen	(Finland) Jaakko Tallus
200	13	18 January 2002	(Czech Republic) Liberec	Ještěd A	K120 / 7.5 km (Sprint)	(Germany) Ronny Ackermann	(Germany) Georg Hettich	(Japan) Daito Takahashi
201	14	20 January 2002	(Czech Republic) Liberec	Ještěd A	K120 / 15 km	(United States) Bill Demong	(Czech Republic) Pavel Churavý	(Austria) Felix Gottwald
2002 Winter Olympics
202	15	1 March 2002	(Finland) Lahti	Salpausselkä	K116 / 15 km	(Finland) Samppa Lajunen	(Germany) Ronny Ackermann	(Finland) Jaakko Tallus
203	16	3 March 2002	(Finland) Lahti	Salpausselkä	K116 / 7.5 km (Sprint)	(Finland) Samppa Lajunen	(Germany) Ronny Ackermann	(Germany) Sebastian Haseney
		9 March 2002	(Sweden) Falun	Lugnet	15 km (Mass) / K115	cancelled		
204	17	13 March 2002	(Norway) Trondheim	Granåsen	K120 / 7.5 km (Sprint)	(Finland) Samppa Lajunen	(Germany) Ronny Ackermann	(Germany) Georg Hettich
205	18	15 March 2002	(Norway) Oslo	Holmenkollbakken	K115 / 15 km	(Germany) Ronny Ackermann	(Finland) Jaakko Tallus	(Finland) Samppa Lajunen
206	19	16 March 2002	(Norway) Oslo	Holmenkollbakken	K115 / 7.5 km (Sprint)	(Finland) Hannu Manninen	(Finland) Samppa Lajunen	(Germany) Ronny Ackermann

=== Team ===
Num	Season	Date	Place	Hill	Discipline	Winner	Second	Third
		1 December 2001	(Norway) Lillehammer	Lysgårdsbakken	K90 / 3 x 5 km	cancelled		
3	1	9 January 2002	(Italy) Val di Fiemme	Trampolino dal Ben	K95 / 3 x 5 km	Finland I Jaakko Tallus; Samppa Lajunen; Mikko Keskinarkaus	Austria Felix Gottwald; Christoph Eugen; Mario Stecher	Germany I Ronny Ackermann; Sebastian Haseney; Jens Gaiser

== Standings ==
=== Overall ===
Rank		Points
1	(Germany) Ronny Ackermann	2110
2	(Austria) Felix Gottwald	1986
3	(Finland) Samppa Lajunen	1863
4	(Finland) Jaakko Tallus	1220
5	(Japan) Daito Takahashi	1101
6	(United States) Todd Lodwick	1079
7	(Austria) Mario Stecher	1017
8	(Finland) Hannu Manninen	911
9	(Austria) Christoph Bieler	870
10	(United States) Bill Demong	842

- Standings after 19 events.

=== Sprint ===
Rank		Points
1	(Germany) Ronny Ackermann	1295
2	(Finland) Samppa Lajunen	1058
3	(Austria) Felix Gottwald	956
4	(Austria) Mario Stecher	647
5	(Finland) Hannu Manninen	585
6	(Finland) Jaakko Tallus	572
7	(Germany) Georg Hettich	551
8	(Japan) Daito Takahashi	549
9	(Austria) Christoph Bieler	485
10	(Germany) Sebastian Haseney	454

- Standings after 11 events.

=== Warsteiner Grand Prix ===
Rank		Points
1	(Austria) Felix Gottwald	405
2	(Germany) Ronny Ackermann	375
3	(Finland) Samppa Lajunen	320
4	(Austria) Mario Stecher	245
5	(Finland) Jaakko Tallus	200
6	(Japan) Daito Takahashi	188
7	(Finland) Mikko Keskinarkaus	179
8	(Finland) Hannu Manninen	165
9	(Germany) Georg Hettich	120
10	(Germany) Sebastian Haseney	118

- Standings after 3 events.

=== Nations Cup ===
Rank		Points
1	Germany	5220
2	Finland	5084
3	Austria	4889
4	United States	2740
5	Japan	2439
6	Norway	2187
7	France	1365
8	Switzerland	1270
9	Czech Republic	894
10	Russia	181

- Standings after 20 events.
