= 2004–05 FIS Nordic Combined World Cup =

International skiing competition

Nordic Combined World Cup 2004/05
Winners
- Overall: (Finland) Hannu Manninen
- Sprint: (Finland) Hannu Manninen
- Warsteiner Grand Prix: (Finland) Hannu Manninen
- Nations Cup: Germany

Competitions
- Venues: 11
- Individual: 17
- Team: 1
- Cancelled: 2

The 2004/05 FIS Nordic Combined World Cup was the 22nd world cup season, a combination of ski jumping and cross-country skiing organized by FIS. It started on 27 Nov 2004 in Kuusamo, Finland and ended on 13 March 2005 in Oslo, Norway.

== Calendar ==
=== Men ===
Num	Season	Date	Place	Hill	Discipline	Winner	Second	Third
241	1	27 November 2004	(Finland) Kuusamo	Rukatunturi	HS142 / 15 km	(Germany) Ronny Ackermann	(Finland) Hannu Manninen	(United States) Todd Lodwick
242	2	28 November 2004	(Finland) Kuusamo	Rukatunturi	HS142 / 7.5 km (Sprint)	(Finland) Hannu Manninen	(United States) Todd Lodwick	(Germany) Ronny Ackermann
243	3	4 December 2004	(Norway) Trondheim	Granåsen	HS131 / 15 km	(Germany) Ronny Ackermann	(Finland) Hannu Manninen	(Austria) Felix Gottwald
244	4	5 December 2004	(Norway) Trondheim	Granåsen	HS131 / 7.5 km (Sprint) *	(Germany) Ronny Ackermann	(Austria) Michael Gruber	(United States) Johnny Spillane
		11 December 2004	(Italy) Val di Fiemme	Trampolino dal Ben	10 km (Mass) / HS134	cancelled		
245	5	30 December 2004	(Germany) Oberhof	Hans-Renner-Schanze	HS140 / 15 km	(Finland) Hannu Manninen	(Germany) Ronny Ackermann	(Austria) Felix Gottwald
246	6	2 January 2005	(Germany) Ruhpolding	Große Zirmbergschanze	HS128 / 7.5 km (Sprint)	(Germany) Ronny Ackermann	(United States) Todd Lodwick	(Finland) Hannu Manninen
247	7	6 January 2005	(Germany) Schonach	Langenwaldschanze	K96 / 15 km	(Finland) Hannu Manninen	(Austria) Mario Stecher	(Japan) Daito Takahashi
4th Warsteiner Grand Prix Overall (30 December 2004 - 6 January 2005)						(Finland) Hannu Manninen	(Germany) Ronny Ackermann	(United States) Todd Lodwick
248	8	8 January 2005	(Austria) Seefeld	Toni-Seelos-Olympiaschanze	HS100 / 7.5 km (Sprint)	(Finland) Hannu Manninen	(Germany) Ronny Ackermann	(Czech Republic) Ladislav Rygl
249	9	9 January 2005	(Austria) Seefeld	Toni-Seelos-Olympiaschanze	HS100 / 15 km	(Finland) Hannu Manninen	(Austria) Felix Gottwald	(Germany) Ronny Ackermann
		22 January 2005	(Czech Republic) Liberec	Ještěd A	HS134 / 7.5 km (Sprint)	cancelled		
250	10	23 January 2005	(Czech Republic) Liberec	Ještěd A	HS134 / 7.5 km (Sprint) **	(Finland) Hannu Manninen	(Norway) Kristian Hammer	(United States) Todd Lodwick
251	11	29 January 2005	(Japan) Sapporo	Ōkurayama	10 km (Mass) / HS134	(Finland) Hannu Manninen	(Germany) Ronny Ackermann	(Norway) Magnus Moan
252	12	30 January 2005	(Japan) Sapporo	Ōkurayama	HS134 / 15 km	(Finland) Hannu Manninen	(Japan) Daito Takahashi	(Finland) Anssi Koivuranta
253	13	12 February 2005	(Italy) Pragelato	Stadio del Trampolino	HS140 / 7.5 km (Sprint)	(Austria) Felix Gottwald	(Finland) Hannu Manninen	(Germany) Björn Kircheisen
FIS Nordic World Ski Championships 2005
254	14	4 March 2005	(Finland) Lahti	Salpausselkä	HS130 / 7.5 km (Sprint)	(Finland) Hannu Manninen	(Germany) Björn Kircheisen	(Germany) Ronny Ackermann
255	15	5 March 2005	(Finland) Lahti	Salpausselkä	HS130 / 15 km	(Germany) Björn Kircheisen	(Germany) Ronny Ackermann	(Finland) Hannu Manninen
256	16	12 March 2005	(Norway) Oslo	Holmenkollbakken	HS128 / 15 km	(Norway) Magnus Moan	(Finland) Hannu Manninen	(Germany) Ronny Ackermann
257	17	13 March 2005	(Norway) Oslo	Holmenkollbakken	HS128 / 7.5 km (Sprint)	(Finland) Hannu Manninen	(Norway) Magnus Moan	(Germany) Ronny Ackermann

*=planned team event replaced with individual; **=planned individual event replaced with sprint

=== Team ===
Num	Season	Date	Place	Hill	Discipline	Winner	Second	Third
5	1	11 February 2005	(Italy) Pragelato	Stadio del Trampolino	HS140 / 3 x 5 km	Finland Antti Kuisma; Jouni Kaitainen; Hannu Manninen	Germany I Sebastian Haseney; Georg Hettich; Björn Kircheisen	Switzerland Andreas Hurschler; Jan Schmid; Ronny Heer

== Standings ==
=== Overall ===
Rank		Points
1	(Finland) Hannu Manninen	1466
2	(Germany) Ronny Ackermann	1070
3	(Austria) Felix Gottwald	677
4	(United States) Todd Lodwick	668
5	(Norway) Magnus Moan	577
6	(Germany) Björn Kircheisen	571
7	(Norway) Petter Tande	505
8	(Japan) Daito Takahashi	486
9	(Austria) Christoph Bieler	454
10	(Austria) Mario Stecher	412

- Standings after 17 events.

=== Sprint ===
Rank		Points
1	(Finland) Hannu Manninen	666
2	(Germany) Ronny Ackermann	484
3	(United States) Todd Lodwick	377
4	(Austria) Felix Gottwald	361
5	(Norway) Magnus Moan	276
6	(Germany) Björn Kircheisen	237
7	(Austria) Christoph Bieler	235
8	(Austria) Mario Stecher	200
8	(Czech Republic) Ladislav Rygl	200
10	(Norway) Petter Tande	196

- Standings after 8 events.

=== Warsteiner Grand Prix ===
Rank		Points
1	(Finland) Hannu Manninen	260
2	(Germany) Ronny Ackermann	180
3	(United States) Todd Lodwick	145
3	(Austria) Felix Gottwald	145
5	(Norway) Petter Tande	140
6	(Austria) Mario Stecher	131
7	(Austria) Christoph Bieler	84
8	(Norway) Magnus Moan	80
9	(Japan) Daito Takahashi	78
10	(Norway) Ola Morten Græsli	67

- Standings after 3 events.

=== Nations Cup ===
Rank		Points
1	Germany	2587
2	Finland	2412
3	Austria	2098
4	Norway	1950
5	United States	1166
6	Japan	649
7	France	455
8	Czech Republic	394
9	Switzerland	275
10	Russia	179

- Standings after 18 events.
