= 2003–04 FIS Nordic Combined World Cup =

International skiing competition

Nordic Combined World Cup 2003/04
Winners
- Overall: (Finland) Hannu Manninen
- Sprint: (Finland) Hannu Manninen
- Warsteiner Grand Prix: (United States) Todd Lodwick
- Nations Cup: Finland

Competitions
- Venues: 13
- Individual: 21
- Team: 1
- Cancelled: 2

The 2003/04 FIS Nordic Combined World Cup was the 21st World Cup season, organized by the International Ski Federation. It started on 29 November 2003 in Kuusamo, Finland and ended on 6 March 2004 in Lahti, Finland.

== Calendar ==
=== Men ===
Num	Season	Date	Place	Hill	Discipline	Winner	Second	Third
222	1	29 November 2003	(Finland) Kuusamo	Rukatunturi	K120 / 15 km	(Germany) Ronny Ackermann	(Finland) Hannu Manninen	(Finland) Samppa Lajunen
223	2	30 November 2003	(Finland) Kuusamo	Rukatunturi	K120 / 7.5 km (Sprint)	(Germany) Ronny Ackermann	(Germany) Sebastian Haseney	(Finland) Hannu Manninen
224	3	6 December 2003	(Norway) Trondheim	Granåsen	K120 / 7.5 km (Sprint)	(Germany) Ronny Ackermann	(Finland) Hannu Manninen	(Norway) Petter Tande
		7 December 2003	(Norway) Trondheim	Granåsen	K120 / 7.5 km (Sprint)	cancelled		
225	4	12 December 2003	(Italy) Val di Fiemme	Trampolino dal Ben	K95 / 15 km	(Germany) Ronny Ackermann	(Germany) Sebastian Haseney	(Austria) Felix Gottwald
226	5	13 December 2003	(Italy) Val di Fiemme	Trampolino dal Ben	10 km (Mass) / K95	(Finland) Hannu Manninen	(Austria) Felix Gottwald	(Austria) Michael Gruber
227	6	30 December 2003	(Germany) Oberhof	Hans-Renner-Schanze	K120 / 15 km	(Germany) Ronny Ackermann	(Austria) Felix Gottwald	(United States) Todd Lodwick
228	7	2 January 2004	(Germany) Reit im Winkl	Franz-Haslberger-Schanze	K90 / 7.5 km (Sprint)	(Norway) Magnus Moan	(Finland) Samppa Lajunen	(United States) Todd Lodwick
229	8	4 January 2004	(Germany) Schonach	Langenwaldschanze	K90 / 15 km	(United States) Todd Lodwick	(Germany) Ronny Ackermann	(Finland) Hannu Manninen
3rd Warsteiner Grand Prix Overall (30 December 2003 - 4 January 2004)						(United States) Todd Lodwick	(Germany) Ronny Ackermann	(Finland) Samppa Lajunen
230	9	10 January 2004	(Austria) Seefeld	Toni-Seelos-Olympiaschanze	K90 / 7.5 km (Sprint)	(Finland) Hannu Manninen	(Finland) Samppa Lajunen	(Germany) Georg Hettich
231	10	11 January 2004	(Austria) Seefeld	Toni-Seelos-Olympiaschanze	K90 / 15 km	(Finland) Hannu Manninen	(Austria) Felix Gottwald	(Germany) Sebastian Haseney
232	11	23 January 2004	(Japan) Nayoro	Piyashiri	K90 / 15 km	(Finland) Samppa Lajunen	(Germany) Sebastian Haseney	(Finland) Hannu Manninen
233	12	25 January 2004	(Japan) Sapporo	Ōkurayama	10 km (Mass) / K120	(Finland) Hannu Manninen	(Finland) Samppa Lajunen	(Austria) Christoph Bieler
234	13	27 January 2004	(Japan) Sapporo	Ōkurayama	K120 / 7.5 km (Sprint)	(Finland) Hannu Manninen	(Norway) Petter Tande	(Austria) Christoph Bieler
235	14	15 February 2004	(Germany) Oberstdorf	Schattenberg	K120 / 7.5 km (Sprint)	(Finland) Hannu Manninen	(Japan) Daito Takahashi	(United States) Todd Lodwick
		21 February 2004	(Czech Republic) Liberec	Ještěd A	HS120 / 7.5 km (Sprint)	cancelled		
236	15	22 February 2004	(Czech Republic) Liberec	Ještěd A	K120 / 15 km	(Germany) Ronny Ackermann	(Finland) Hannu Manninen	(Finland) Samppa Lajunen
237	16	28 February 2004	(Norway) Oslo	Holmenkollbakken	K115 / 7.5 km (Sprint)	(Finland) Hannu Manninen	(Finland) Samppa Lajunen	(Germany) Ronny Ackermann
238	17	29 February 2004	(Norway) Oslo	Holmenkollbakken	K115 / 15 km	(Germany) Ronny Ackermann	(Finland) Samppa Lajunen	(Austria) Mario Stecher
239	18	5 March 2004	(Finland) Lahti	Salpausselkä	K116 / 7.5 km (Sprint)	(Japan) Daito Takahashi	(Austria) Felix Gottwald	(Finland) Hannu Manninen
240	19	6 March 2004	(Finland) Lahti	Salpausselkä	K116 / 15 km	(Japan) Daito Takahashi	(Austria) Felix Gottwald	(Finland) Samppa Lajunen

=== Team ===
Num	Season	Date	Place	Hill	Discipline	Winner	Second	Third
4	1	14 February 2004	(Germany) Oberstdorf	Schattenberg	K140 / 3 x 5 km	Finland Samppa Lajunen; Jaakko Tallus; Hannu Manninen	Germany I Sebastian Haseney; Georg Hettich; Ronny Ackermann	Austria I Felix Gottwald; Michael Gruber; Christoph Bieler

== Standings ==
=== Overall ===
Rank		Points
1	(Finland) Hannu Manninen	1392
2	(Germany) Ronny Ackermann	1143
3	(Finland) Samppa Lajunen	1058
4	(Austria) Felix Gottwald	818
5	(Japan) Daito Takahashi	817
6	(Germany) Sebastian Haseney	744
7	(United States) Todd Lodwick	705
8	(Norway) Magnus Moan	552
9	(Austria) Christoph Bieler	549
10	(Norway) Petter Tande	543

- Standings after 19 events.

=== Sprint ===
Rank		Points
1	(Finland) Hannu Manninen	650
2	(Finland) Samppa Lajunen	397
3	(Germany) Ronny Ackermann	394
4	(Japan) Daito Takahashi	365
5	(Norway) Magnus Moan	321
6	(Norway) Petter Tande	275
7	(Germany) Sebastian Haseney	275
8	(Austria) Felix Gottwald	260
9	(United States) Todd Lodwick	253
10	(Austria) Christoph Bieler	209

- Standings after 8 events.

=== Warsteiner Grand Prix ===
Rank		Points
1	(United States) Todd Lodwick	220
2	(Germany) Ronny Ackermann	212
3	(Finland) Samppa Lajunen	166
4	(Finland) Hannu Manninen	150
5	(Norway) Magnus Moan	133
6	(Austria) Christoph Bieler	118
7	(France) Ludovic Roux	106
8	(Japan) Daito Takahashi	99
9	(Germany) Sebastian Haseney	99
10	(Switzerland) Jan Schmid	67

- Standings after 3 events.

=== Nations Cup ===
Rank		Points
1	Finland	3272
2	Germany	2836
3	Austria	2292
4	Norway	1648
5	Japan	937
6	United States	935
7	Switzerland	780
8	France	643
9	Czech Republic	299
10	Italy	51

- Standings after 22 events.
