= 2000–01 FIS Nordic Combined World Cup =

International skiing competition

Nordic Combined World Cup 2000/01
Winners
- Overall: (Austria) Felix Gottwald
- Sprint: (Austria) Felix Gottwald
- Nations Cup: Austria

Competitions
- Venues: 9
- Individual: 15
- Team: 1
- Cancelled: 3

The 2000/01 FIS Nordic Combined World Cup was the 18th world cup season, a combination of ski jumping and cross-country skiing organized by FIS. It started on 2 Dec 2000 in Kuopio, Finland and ended on 10 March 2001 in Oslo, Norway.

== Calendar ==
=== Men ===
Num	Season	Date	Place	Hill	Discipline	Winner	Second	Third
173	1	2 December 2000	(Finland) Kuopio	Puijo	K120 / 7.5 km (Sprint)	(Austria) Felix Gottwald	(Germany) Ronny Ackermann	(Germany) Marko Baacke
174	2	3 December 2000	(Finland) Kuopio	Puijo	K120 / 10 km (Mass)	(Austria) Felix Gottwald	(Norway) Bjarte Engen Vik	(Germany) Ronny Ackermann
		9 Dec2000	(Austria) Ramsau	W90-Mattensprunganlage	K90 / 10 km (Mass)	cancelled		
		10 December 2000	(Austria) Ramsau	W90-Mattensprunganlage	K120 / 7.5 km (Sprint)	cancelled		
		16 December 2000	(Italy) Val di Fiemme	Trampolino dal Ben	K120 / 15 km	cancelled		
175	3	29 December 2000	(Norway) Lillehammer	Lysgårdsbakken	K90 / 7.5 km (Sprint)	(Norway) Kristian Hammer	(Norway) Bjarte Engen Vik	(Finland) Samppa Lajunen
176	4	30 December 2000	(Norway) Lillehammer	Lysgårdsbakken	K90 / 15 km	(Norway) Bjarte Engen Vik	(Finland) Samppa Lajunen	(Czech Republic) Ladislav Rygl
177	5	3 January 2001	(Germany) Reit im Winkl	Franz-Haslberger-Schanze	K90 / 10 km (Mass)	(Norway) Bjarte Engen Vik	(Austria) Felix Gottwald	(Finland) Hannu Manninen
178	6	5 January 2001	(Germany) Reit im Winkl	Franz-Haslberger-Schanze	K90 / 7.5 km (Sprint)	(Germany) Ronny Ackermann	(Austria) Felix Gottwald	(Norway) Bjarte Engen Vik
179	7	7 January 2001	(Germany) Reit im Winkl	Franz-Haslberger-Schanze	K90 / 15 km	(Norway) Kristian Hammer	(Norway) Bjarte Engen Vik	(Germany) Ronny Ackermann
180	8	19 January 2001	(United States) Park City	Utah Olympic Park	K120 / 7.5 km (Sprint)	(Austria) Felix Gottwald	(Germany) Ronny Ackermann	(Norway) Kristian Hammer
181	9	25 January 2001	(United States) Steamboat Springs	Howelsen Hill	K114 / 15 km	(United States) Todd Lodwick	(Austria) Felix Gottwald	(Czech Republic) Ladislav Rygl
182	10	26 January 2001	(United States) Steamboat Springs	Howelsen Hill	K90 / 7.5 km (Sprint)	(Germany) Sebastian Haseney	(Germany) Marko Baacke	(Austria) Felix Gottwald
183	11	8 February 2001	(Czech Republic) Liberec	Ještěd A	K120 / 15 km	(Germany) Ronny Ackermann	(Austria) David Kreiner	(Germany) Sebastian Haseney
FIS Nordic World Ski Championships 2001
184	12	1 March 2001	(Japan) Nayoro	Piyashiri	K90 / 10 km (Mass)	(Austria) Felix Gottwald	(Finland) Samppa Lajunen	(Norway) Bjarte Engen Vik
185	13	3 March 2001	(Japan) Sapporo	Ōkurayama	K120 / 15 km	(Norway) Kristian Hammer	(Finland) Samppa Lajunen	(Austria) Felix Gottwald
186	14	9 March 2001	(Norway) Oslo	Holmenkollbakken	K115 / 15 km	(Austria) Felix Gottwald	(Norway) Bjarte Engen Vik	(Germany) Marko Baacke
187	15	10 March 2001	(Norway) Oslo	Holmenkollbakken	K115 / 7.5 km (Sprint)	(Austria) Felix Gottwald	(Finland) Hannu Manninen	(Norway) Kristian Hammer

=== Team ===
Num	Season	Date	Place	Hill	Discipline	Winner	Second	Third
2	1	21 January 2001	(United States) Park City	Utah Olympic Park	K90 / 3 x 5 km Mass Start	Finland I Hannu Manninen; Samppa Lajunen; Jaakko Tallus	Austria Christoph Eugen; Felix Gottwald; David Kreiner	Norway I Kenneth Braaten; Kristian Hammer; Bjarte Engen Vik

== Standings ==
=== Overall ===
Rank		Points
1	(Austria) Felix Gottwald	1785
2	(Germany) Ronny Ackermann	1342
3	(Norway) Bjarte Engen Vik	1209
4	(Norway) Kristian Hammer	1195
5	(Finland) Samppa Lajunen	1010
6	(Czech Republic) Ladislav Rygl	900
7	(Germany) Marko Baacke	851
8	(United States) Todd Lodwick	848
9	(Austria) Christoph Eugen	752
10	(Germany) Sebastian Haseney	733

- Standings after 15 events.

=== Sprint ===
Rank		Points
1	(Austria) Felix Gottwald	750
2	(Germany) Ronny Ackermann	572
3	(Norway) Kristian Hammer	435
4	(Finland) Samppa Lajunen	392
5	(Germany) Marko Baacke	376
6	(Czech Republic) Ladislav Rygl	369
6	(Germany) Sebastian Haseney	369
8	(United States) Todd Lodwick	354
9	(Norway) Bjarte Engen Vik	349
10	(Finland) Hannu Manninen	338

- Standings after 6 events.

=== Nations Cup ===
Rank		Points
1	Austria	4102
2	Norway	3865
3	Germany	3647
4	Finland	2851
5	United States	1828
6	Japan	1589
7	France	1159
8	Czech Republic	1148
9	Switzerland	605
10	Italy	449

- Standings after 16 events.
