= 1999–2000 FIS Nordic Combined World Cup =

1999–2000 season of Skiing championship

Nordic Combined World Cup 1999/00
Winners
- Overall: (Finland) Samppa Lajunen
- Nations Cup: Finland

Competitions
- Venues: 15
- Individual: 18
- Team: 1
- Cancelled: 2

The 1999/2000 FIS Nordic Combined World Cup was the 17th World Cup season, a combination of ski jumping and cross-country skiing organized by FIS. It started on 9 Dec 1999 in Vuokatti, Finland and ended on 17 March 2000 in Val di Fiemme, Italy.

== Calendar ==
=== Men ===
Num	Season	Date	Place	Hill	Discipline	Winner	Second	Third
		4 December 1999	(Norway) Lillehammer	Lysgårdsbakken	K90 / 15 km	cancelled		
		5 December 1999	(Norway) Lillehammer	Lysgårdsbakken	K120 / 7.5 km (Sprint)	cancelled		
155	1	9 December 1999	(Finland) Vuokatti	Hyppyrimäki	K90 / 15 km	(Germany) Ronny Ackermann	(Finland) Samppa Lajunen	(Norway) Bjarte Engen Vik
156	2	11 December 1999	(Finland) Vuokatti	Hyppyrimäki	K90 / 7.5 km (Sprint)	(Finland) Samppa Lajunen	(Norway) Bjarte Engen Vik	(Finland) Hannu Manninen
157	3	19 December 1999	(United States) Steamboat Springs	Howelsen Hill	K112 / 15 km	(Czech Republic) Ladislav Rygl	(Finland) Samppa Lajunen	(Norway) Bjarte Engen Vik
158	4	21 December 1999	(United States) Steamboat Springs	Howelsen Hill	K114 / 7.5 km (Sprint)	(Finland) Samppa Lajunen	(Norway) Bjarte Engen Vik	(Czech Republic) Ladislav Rygl
159	5	3 January 2000	(Germany) Oberwiesenthal	Fichtelbergschanzen	K90 / 7.5 km (Sprint)	(Finland) Samppa Lajunen	(Norway) Bjarte Engen Vik	(Finland) Jari Mantila
160	6	5 January 2000	(Germany) Reit im Winkl	Franz-Haslberger-Schanze	K90 / 10 km (Mass)	(Norway) Bjarte Engen Vik	(Finland) Samppa Lajunen	(Austria) Mario Stecher
161	7	8 January 2000	(Germany) Schonach	Langenwaldschanze	K90 / 15 km	(Norway) Bjarte Engen Vik	(Finland) Samppa Lajunen	(Austria) Mario Stecher
162	8	11 January 2000	(Italy) Val di Fiemme	Trampolino dal Ben	K90 / 15 km	(Finland) Samppa Lajunen	(Japan) Kenji Ogiwara	(Norway) Bjarte Engen Vik
163	9	16 January 2000	(Austria) Breitenwang	Raimund-Ertl-Schanze	K85 / 15 km (Sprint)	(Finland) Samppa Lajunen	(Czech Republic) Ladislav Rygl	(Austria) Felix Gottwald
164	10	22 January 2000	(Czech Republic) Liberec	Ještěd A	K120 / 15 km	(Czech Republic) Ladislav Rygl	(Finland) Samppa Lajunen	(Japan) Kenji Ogiwara
165	11	5 February 2000	(Japan) Hakuba	Olympic Hills	K120 / 15 km	(Norway) Bjarte Engen Vik	(Finland) Hannu Manninen	(Germany) Ronny Ackermann
166	12	8 February 2000	(Japan) Nozawa Onsen	Mukobayashi	K90 / 7.5 km (Sprint)	(Finland) Samppa Lajunen	(Norway) Bjarte Engen Vik	(Czech Republic) Ladislav Rygl
167	13	12 February 2000	(Japan) Sapporo	Ōkurayama	K120 / 15 km	(Norway) Kristian Hammer	(United States) Todd Lodwick	(Austria) Mario Stecher
168	14	26 February 2000	(France) Chaux-Neuve	La Côté Feuillée	K90 / 15 km	(Finland) Samppa Lajunen	(Finland) Jaakko Tallus	(Austria) Mario Stecher
169	15	4 March 2000	(Finland) Lahti	Salpausselkä	K90 / 7.5 km (Sprint)	(Finland) Hannu Manninen	(Norway) Bjarte Engen Vik	(Norway) Kristian Hammer
170	16	10 March 2000	(Norway) Oslo	Holmenkollbakken	K115 / 15 km	(Norway) Bjarte Engen Vik	(Finland) Samppa Lajunen	(Finland) Jaakko Tallus
171	17	11 March 2000	(Norway) Oslo	Holmenkollbakken	K115 / 7.5 km (Sprint)	(Norway) Bjarte Engen Vik	(Norway) Kenneth Braaten	(Norway) Kristian Hammer
172	18	17 March 2000	(Switzerland) St. Moritz (ski jumping) (Italy) St. Caterina (cr.-country)	Olympiaschanze	K90 / 15 km	(Finland) Samppa Lajunen	(Japan) Kenji Ogiwara	(Norway) Lars Andreas Østvik

=== Team ===
Num	Season	Date	Place	Hill	Discipline	Winner	Second	Third
1	1	16 March 2000	(Switzerland) St. Moritz (ski jumping) (Italy) St. Caterina (cr.-country)	Olympiaschanze	K90 / 3 x 5 km Mass Start	Austria Michael Gruber; Christoph Bieler; Felix Gottwald	Finland I Hannu Manninen; Jaakko Tallus; Samppa Lajunen	Norway I Kristian Hammer; Kenneth Braaten; Bjarte Engen Vik

== Standings ==
=== Overall ===
Rank		Points
1	(Finland) Samppa Lajunen	2175
2	(Norway) Bjarte Engen Vik	1990
3	(Czech Republic) Ladislav Rygl	1274
4	(United States) Todd Lodwick	1138
5	(Germany) Ronny Ackermann	1100
6	(Japan) Kenji Ogiwara	1076
7	(Austria) Felix Gottwald	1020
8	(Austria) Mario Stecher	955
9	(Finland) Hannu Manninen	898
10	(Finland) Jari Mantila	880

- Standings after 18 events.

=== Nations Cup ===
Rank		Points
1	Finland	5054
2	Norway	4962
3	Germany	2945
4	Japan	2674
5	Austria	2621
6	Czech Republic	1661
7	United States	1391
8	France	1284
9	Russia	789
10	Switzerland	434

- Standings after 18 events.
