= 2005–06 FIS Nordic Combined World Cup =

International skiing competition

Nordic Combined World Cup 2005/06
Winners
- Overall: (Finland) Hannu Manninen
- Sprint: (Finland) Hannu Manninen
- Warsteiner Grand Prix: (Finland) Hannu Manninen
- Nations Cup: Germany

Competitions
- Venues: 12
- Individual: 21

The 2006/07 FIS Nordic Combined World Cup was the 23rd world cup season, a combination of ski jumping and cross-country skiing organized by FIS. It started on 25 Nov 2005 in Kuusamo, Finland and ended on 19 March 2006 in Sapporo, Japan.

== Calendar ==
=== Men ===
Num	Season	Date	Place	Hill	Discipline	Winner	Second	Third
258	1	25 November 2005	(Finland) Kuusamo	Rukatunturi	HS142 / 15 km	(Finland) Hannu Manninen	(Finland) Anssi Koivuranta	(Norway) Petter Tande
259	2	27 November 2005	(Finland) Kuusamo	Rukatunturi	HS142 / 7.5 km (Sprint)	(Austria) Mario Stecher	(Norway) Petter Tande	(Germany) Georg Hettich
260	3	3 December 2005	(Norway) Lillehammer *	Lysgårdsbakken	HS131 / 15 km	(Finland) Hannu Manninen	(Austria) Felix Gottwald	(Germany) Ronny Ackermann
261	4	4 December 2005	(Norway) Lillehammer *	Lysgårdsbakken	HS131 / 7.5 km (Sprint)	(Finland) Hannu Manninen	(United States) Todd Lodwick	(Germany) Ronny Ackermann
262	5	17 December 2005	(Austria) Ramsau	W90-Mattensprunganlage	10 km (Mass) / HS100	(Norway) Petter Tande	(Germany) Ronny Ackermann	(Norway) Magnus Moan
263	6	18 December 2005	(Austria) Ramsau	W90-Mattensprunganlage	HS100 / 7.5 km (Sprint)	(Norway) Magnus Moan	(Norway) Ola Morten Græsli	(France) Jason Lamy Chappuis
264	7	30 December 2005	(Germany) Oberhof	Hans-Renner-Schanze	HS140 / 15 km	(Finland) Hannu Manninen	(Germany) Ronny Ackermann	(Norway) Magnus Moan
265	8	3 January 2006	(Germany) Ruhpolding	Große Zirmbergschanze	HS128 / 7.5 km (Sprint)	(Austria) Felix Gottwald	(Germany) Ronny Ackermann	(Norway) Petter Tande
266	9	6 January 2006	(Germany) Schonach	Langenwaldschanze	HS96 / 15 km	(Finland) Hannu Manninen	(Austria) Christoph Bieler	(Norway) Magnus Moan
5th Warsteiner Grand Prix Overall (30 December 2005 - 6 January 2006)						(Finland) Hannu Manninen	(Germany) Ronny Ackermann	(Austria) Felix Gottwald
267	10	14 January 2006	(Italy) Val di Fiemme	Trampolino dal Ben	10 km (Mass) / HS134	(Finland) Hannu Manninen	(Finland) Anssi Koivuranta	(Austria) Christoph Bieler
268	11	15 January 2006	(Italy) Val di Fiemme	Trampolino dal Ben	HS134 / 7.5 km (Sprint)	(Finland) Hannu Manninen	(Austria) Mario Stecher	(Austria) Felix Gottwald
269	12	21 January 2006	(Czech Republic) Harrachov	Čerťák	HS100 / 7.5 km (Sprint)	(Finland) Hannu Manninen	(Germany) Georg Hettich	(France) Jason Lamy Chappuis
270	13	22 January 2006	(Czech Republic) Harrachov	Čerťák	HS100 / 15 km	(Finland) Hannu Manninen	(Germany) Björn Kircheisen	(Germany) Georg Hettich
271	14	28 January 2006	(Austria) Seefeld	Toni-Seelos-Olympiaschanze	HS 100 / 7.5 km (Sprint)	(Finland) Hannu Manninen	(Norway) Magnus Moan	(United States) Todd Lodwick
272	15	29 January 2006	(Austria) Seefeld	Toni-Seelos-Olympiaschanze	HS100 / 15 km	(Finland) Hannu Manninen	(United States) Todd Lodwick	(Austria) Christoph Bieler
2006 Winter Olympics
273	16	4 March 2006	(Finland) Lahti	Salpausselkä	HS130 / 15 km	(Norway) Magnus Moan	(Germany) Björn Kircheisen	(Austria) Felix Gottwald
274	17	5 March 2006	(Finland) Lahti	Salpausselkä	HS130 / 7.5 km (Sprint)	(Germany) Björn Kircheisen	(Norway) Petter Tande	(Germany) Georg Hettich
275	18	11 March 2006	(Norway) Oslo	Holmenkollbakken	HS128 / 15 km	(Norway) Petter Tande	(France) Jason Lamy Chappuis	(Finland) Anssi Koivuranta
276	19	12 March 2006	(Norway) Oslo	Holmenkollbakken	HS128 / 7.5 km (Sprint)	(Germany) Björn Kircheisen	(Norway) Magnus Moan	(Finland) Anssi Koivuranta
277	20	18 March 2006	(Japan) Sapporo	Ōkurayama	10 km (Mass) / HS134	(Finland) Hannu Manninen	(Germany) Björn Kircheisen	(Austria) Christoph Bieler
278	21	19 March 2006	(Japan) Sapporo	Ōkurayama	HS134 / 7.5 km (Sprint)	(France) Jason Lamy Chappuis	(Finland) Hannu Manninen	(Norway) Petter Tande

*=Trondheim was cancelled and replaced with Lillehammer

== Standings ==
=== Overall ===
Rank		Points
1	(Finland) Hannu Manninen	1500
2	(Norway) Magnus Moan	961
3	(Germany) Björn Kircheisen	888
4	(Norway) Petter Tande	812
5	(France) Jason Lamy Chappuis	730
6	(Germany) Georg Hettich	711
7	(Austria) Felix Gottwald	708
8	(Austria) Christoph Bieler	706
9	(Austria) Mario Stecher	664
10	(Finland) Anssi Koivuranta	597

- Standings after 21 events.

=== Sprint ===
Rank		Points
1	(Finland) Hannu Manninen	624
2	(Norway) Magnus Moan	454
3	(Germany) Björn Kircheisen	450
4	(Germany) Georg Hettich	445
5	(France) Jason Lamy Chappuis	397
6	(Norway) Petter Tande	391
7	(Austria) Mario Stecher	364
8	(Austria) Felix Gottwald	349
8	(Austria) Christoph Bieler	279
10	(Germany) Ronny Ackermann	266

- Standings after 10 events.

=== Warsteiner Grand Prix ===
Rank		Points
1	(Finland) Hannu Manninen	245
2	(Germany) Ronny Ackermann	205
3	(Austria) Felix Gottwald	160
4	(Norway) Magnus Moan	156
5	(Austria) Christoph Bieler	146
6	(Austria) Mario Stecher	122
7	(Finland) Jaakko Tallus	103
8	(Norway) Petter Tande	78
9	(Germany) Björn Kircheisen	74
10	(Germany) Jens Gaiser	63

- Standings after 3 events.

=== Nations Cup ===
Rank		Points
1	Germany	2950
2	Finland	2828
3	Austria	2558
4	Norway	2308
5	Japan	944
6	France	754
7	Switzerland	705
8	United States	597
9	Czech Republic	130
10	Russia	104

- Standings after 21 events.
