= 1998–99 FIS Nordic Combined World Cup =

International skiing competition

Nordic Combined World Cup 1998/99
Winners
- Overall: (Norway) Bjarte Engen Vik
- Nations Cup: Norway

Competitions
- Venues: 14
- Individual: 17

The 1998/99 FIS Nordic Combined World Cup was the 16th world cup season, a combination of ski jumping and cross-country skiing organized by FIS. It started on 21 Nov 1998 in Rovaniemi, Finland and ended on 21 March 1999 in Zakopane, Poland.

== Calendar ==
=== Men ===
| Num | Season | Date | Place | Hill | Discipline | Winner | Second | Third |
|---|---|---|---|---|---|---|---|---|
| 138 | 1 | 21 November 1998 | (Finland) Rovaniemi | Ounasvaara | K90 / 15 km | (Finland) Hannu Manninen | (Norway) Bjarte Engen Vik | (United States) Todd Lodwick |
| 139 | 2 | 24 November 1998 | (Finland) Rovaniemi | Ounasvaara | K90 / 7.5 km (Sprint) | (Finland) Hannu Manninen | (Finland) Samppa Lajunen | (Norway) Bjarte Engen Vik |
| 140 | 3 | 27 November 1998 | (Norway) Lillehammer | Lysgårdsbakken | K90 / 15 km | (Norway) Bjarte Engen Vik | (Czech Republic) Ladislav Rygl | (Finland) Hannu Manninen |
| 141 | 4 | 29 November 1998 | (Norway) Lillehammer | Lysgårdsbakken | K120 / 7.5 km (Sprint) | (Finland) Hannu Manninen | (Austria) Felix Gottwald | (Norway) Bjarte Engen Vik |
| 142 | 5 | 10 December 1998 | (United States) Steamboat Springs | Howelsen Hill | K88 / 7.5 km (Sprint) | (Finland) Hannu Manninen | (Norway) Bjarte Engen Vik | (Austria) Felix Gottwald |
| 143 | 6 | 12 December 1998 | (United States) Steamboat Springs | Howelsen Hill | K112 / 15 km | (Norway) Bjarte Engen Vik | (Finland) Hannu Manninen | (Austria) Felix Gottwald |
| 144 | 7 | 29 December 1998 | (Germany) Oberwiesenthal | Fichtelbergschanzen | K90 / 7.5 km (Sprint) | (Finland) Hannu Manninen | (Norway) Kenneth Braaten | (Finland) Samppa Lajunen |
| 145 | 8 | 3 January 1999 | (Germany) Schonach | Langenwaldschanze | K90 / 15 km | (Norway) Bjarte Engen Vik | (Finland) Jaakko Tallus | (Finland) Samppa Lajunen |
| 146 | 9 | 9 January 1999 | (Slovakia) Štrbské Pleso | MS 1970 B | K90 / 15 km | (Norway) Bjarte Engen Vik | (Norway) Kenneth Braaten | (Austria) Felix Gottwald |
| 147 | 10 | 16 January 1999 | (Czech Republic) Liberec | Ještěd | K120 / 15 km | (Norway) Bjarte Engen Vik | (Finland) Hannu Manninen | (Austria) Felix Gottwald |
| 148 | 11 | 24 January 1999 | (Switzerland) St. Moritz | Olympiaschanze | K95 / 7.5 km (Sprint) | (Norway) Bjarte Engen Vik | (Finland) Hannu Manninen | (Norway) Kenneth Braaten |
| 149 | 12 | 26 January 1999 | (Italy) Val di Fiemme | Trampolino dal Ben | K90 / 15 km | (Norway) Bjarte Engen Vik | (Finland) Samppa Lajunen | (Norway) Knut Tore Apeland |
| 150 | 13 | 30 January 1999 | (France) Chaux-Neuve | La Côté Feuillée | K90 / 15 km | (Finland) Samppa Lajunen | (United States) Todd Lodwick | (Czech Republic) Ladislav Rygl |
FIS Nordic World Ski Championships 1999
| 151 | 14 | 6 March 1999 | (Finland) Lahti | Salpausselkä | K90 / 15 km | (Finland) Samppa Lajunen | (Norway) Bjarte Engen Vik | (Germany) Sebastian Haseney |
| 152 | 15 | 11 March 1999 | (Sweden) Falun | Lugnet | K115 / 7.5 km (Sprint) | (Czech Republic) Ladislav Rygl | (Japan) Kenji Ogiwara | (Finland) Hannu Manninen |
| 153 | 16 | 12 March 1999 | (Norway) Oslo | Holmenkollbakken | K115 / 15 km | (Norway) Bjarte Engen Vik | (Finland) Hannu Manninen | (Japan) Kenji Ogiwara |
| 154 | 17 | 21 March 1999 | (Poland) Zakopane | Wielka Krokiew | K116 / 15 km | (Norway) Bjarte Engen Vik | (Japan) Satoshi Mori | (Czech Republic) Ladislav Rygl |

== Standings ==
=== Overall ===
| Rank | | Points |
|---|---|---|
| 1 | (Norway) Bjarte Engen Vik | 2035 |
| 2 | (Finland) Hannu Manninen | 1667 |
| 3 | (Czech Republic) Ladislav Rygl | 1140 |
| 4 | (Austria) Felix Gottwald | 1080 |
| 5 | (Finland) Samppa Lajunen | 986 |
| 6 | (Norway) Kenneth Braaten | 979 |
| 7 | (Japan) Kenji Ogiwara | 977 |
| 8 | (United States) Todd Lodwick | 898 |
| 9 | (Norway) Fred Børre Lundberg | 887 |
| 10 | (Russia) Dmitry Sinitsyn | 881 |

- Standings after 17 events.

=== Nations Cup ===
| Rank | | Points |
|---|---|---|
| 1 | Norway | 5139 |
| 2 | Finland | 4051 |
| 3 | Japan | 2551 |
| 4 | Austria | 2447 |
| 5 | Russia | 2048 |
| 6 | Germany | 1780 |
| 7 | Czech Republic | 1768 |
| 8 | Switzerland | 1464 |
| 9 | France | 1403 |
| 10 | United States | 1017 |

- Standings after 17 events.
