= Nordic skiing at the 2002 Winter Olympics =

At the 2002 Winter Olympics, eighteen Nordic skiing events were contested – twelve cross-country skiing events, three ski jumping events, and three Nordic combined events.

Nordic skiing discipline	Men's events	Women's events
Cross-country skiing	• 1.5 km sprint	• 1.5 km sprint
Cross-country skiing	• 10 km + 10 km pursuit	• 5 km + 5 km pursuit
Cross-country skiing	• 15 km (classical)	• 10 km (classical)
Cross-country skiing	• 30 km mass start	• 15 km mass start
Cross-country skiing	• 50 km (classical)	• 30 km (classical)
Cross-country skiing	• 4 × 10 km relay	• 4 × 5 km relay
Ski jumping	• Large hill – individual	
Ski jumping	• Normal hill – individual	
Ski jumping	• Large hill – team	
Nordic combined	• Individual	
Nordic combined	• Sprint	
Nordic combined	• Team	
