= Samppa =

Samppa is a Finnish given name. Notable people with the name include:

- Samppa Lajunen (born 1979), Finnish Nordic combined athlete
- Samppa Hirvonen, bass guitarist
