= Keskinarkaus =

Keskinarkaus is a Finnish surname. Notable people with the surname include:

- Matti Keskinarkaus (born 1976), Finnish orienteer
- Mikko Keskinarkaus (born 1979), Finnish skier
- Seppo Keskinarkaus (born 1949), Finnish orienteer
