= Thoralf Strømstad =

Norwegian Nordic skier

Medal record

Representing Norway

Men's cross-country skiing

Olympic Games
Silver medal – second place	1924 Chamonix	50 km

Men's Nordic combined

Olympic Games
Silver medal – second place	1924 Chamonix	Individual

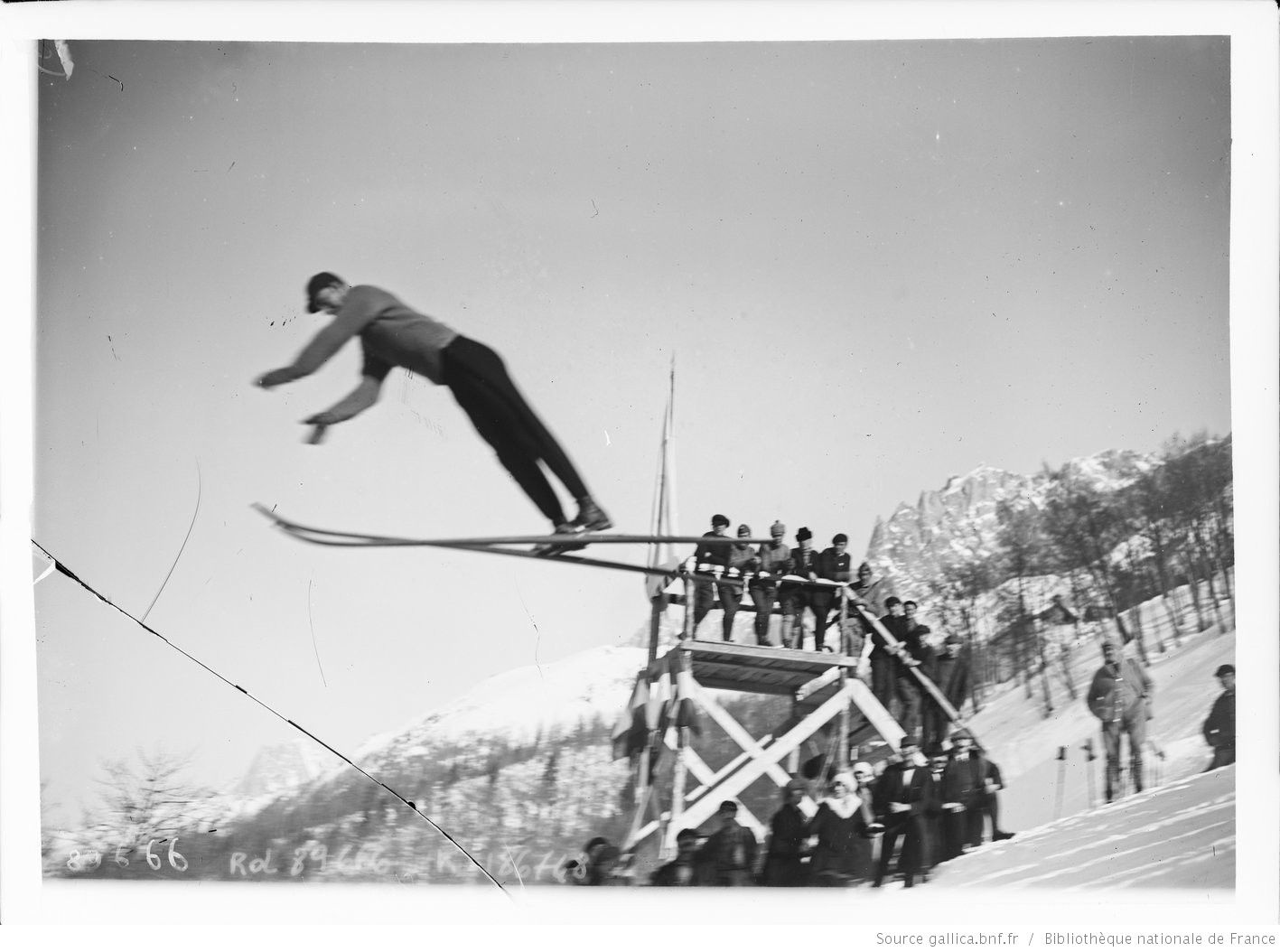

Thoralf Strømstad (13 January 1897 – 10 January 1984) was a Norwegian Nordic skier who was awarded the Holmenkollen medal in 1923. Strømstad also earned silvers at the 1924 Winter Olympics both in 50 km cross-country skiing and in the Nordic combined.

He represented the club Fossum IF.

== Cross-country skiing results ==
All results are sourced from the International Ski Federation (FIS).

=== Olympic Games ===
- 1 medal – (1 silver)

Year	Age	18 km	50 km
1924	27	—	SIlver

== See also ==
- List of Olympic medalists in cross-country skiing (men)
- List of Olympic medalists in Nordic combined
