= Marko Baacke =

German Nordic combined skier (born 1980)

Medal record

Men's Nordic combined

World Championships
Gold medal – first place	2001 Lahti	7.5 km sprint

Marco Baacke (born February 10, 1980) is a former German Nordic combined skier who competed from 1999 to 2004. He won a gold medal in the 7.5 km sprint at the 2001 FIS Nordic World Ski Championships in Lahti.

Baacke also earned two other individual career victories in his career both in the 15 km individual events (1999: Germany, 2000: Austria).
