= Nordic combined at the 2006 Winter Olympics =

Nordic combined at the XX Olympic Winter Games
- Venue: Pragelato
- Dates: 11–21 February 2006
- No. of events: 3
- Competitors: 59 from 15 nations

Nordic combined at the 2006 Winter Olympics, consisted of three events held over ten days, from 11 February to 21 February. The events took place in Pragelato.

== Medal summary ==
=== Medal table ===
Rank	Nation	Gold	Silver	Bronze	Total
1	Austria	2	1	0	3
2	Germany	1	1	1	3
3	Norway	0	1	1	2
4	Finland	0	0	1	1
Totals (4 entries)		3	3	3	9

=== Events ===
Event	Gold		Silver		Bronze	
Sprint	Felix Gottwald; Austria	18:29.0	Magnus Moan; Norway	18:34.4	Georg Hettich; Germany	18:38.6
Individual Gundersen	Georg Hettich; Germany	39:44.6	Felix Gottwald; Austria	39:54.4	Magnus Moan; Norway	40:00.8
Team	Austria; Michael Gruber; Christoph Bieler; Felix Gottwald; Mario Stecher	49:52.6	Germany; Björn Kircheisen; Georg Hettich; Ronny Ackermann; Jens Gaiser	50:07.9	Finland; Antti Kuisma; Anssi Koivuranta; Jaakko Tallus; Hannu Manninen	50:19.4

== Participating National Olympic Committees ==
Fifteen nations contributed Nordic combinators to the events at Torino.

- Austria (4)
- Canada (2)
- Czech Republic (5)
- Estonia (1)
- Finland (5)
- France (4)
- Germany (5)
- Italy (5)
- Japan (5)
- Norway (4)
- Russia (5)
- Slovenia (1)
- Switzerland (5)
- Ukraine (2)
- United States (6)
