= FIS Nordic World Ski Championships 2003 =

2003 ski tournament in Italy

- Official logo for the FIS Nordic World Ski Championships 2003.
- Host city: Val di Fiemme, Italy
- Events: 18
- Opening: 18 February 2003
- Closing: 1 March 2003
- Main venue: Lago di Tesero Cross Country Stadium; Trampolino dal Ben
- Website: Valdifiemme2003.com

The FIS Nordic World Ski Championships 2003 took place February 18 – March 1, 2003 in Val di Fiemme, Italy for a second time (1991). The ski jumping team normal hill held in 2001 was not held at this championships while the women's 30 km returned after being cancelled in the previous championships due to extremely cold weather. Additionally the pursuit races went from separate races run on the same day (combined) to Skiathlon races.

== Men's cross-country ==
=== 1.5 km individual sprint ===
February 26, 2003

Medal	Athlete	Time
Gold	Thobias Fredriksson (SWE)	3:12.1
Silver	Håvard Bjerkeli (NOR)	3:12.9
Bronze	Tor Arne Hetland (NOR)	3:13.5

=== 15 km classical ===
February 21, 2003

Medal	Athlete	Time
Gold	Axel Teichmann (GER)	35:47.5
Silver	Jaak Mae (EST)	35:54.4
Bronze	Frode Estil (NOR)	35:56.0

=== 10 km + 10 km double pursuit ===
February 23, 2003

Medal	Athlete	Time
Gold	Per Elofsson (SWE)	47:42.3
Silver	Tore Ruud Hofstad (NOR)	47:42.6
Bronze	Jörgen Brink (SWE)	47:42.7

=== 30 km classical mass start ===
February 19, 2003

Medal	Athlete	Time
Gold	Thomas Alsgaard (NOR)	1:12:29.3
Silver	Anders Aukland (NOR)	1:12:29.9
Bronze	Frode Estil (NOR)	1:12:30.4

=== 50 km freestyle ===
March 1, 2003

Medal	Athlete	Time
Gold	Martin Koukal (CZE)	1:54:25.3
Silver	Anders Södergren (SWE)	1:54:40.3
Bronze	Jörgen Brink (SWE)	1:55:09.0

=== 4 × 10 km relay ===
February 25, 2003

Medal	Team	Time
Gold	Norway (Anders Aukland, Frode Estil, Tore Ruud Hofstad, Thomas Alsgaard)	1:31:56.4
Silver	Germany (Jens Filbrich, Andreas Schlütter, René Sommerfeldt, Axel Teichmann)	1:31:56.6
Bronze	Sweden (Anders Södergren, Mathias Fredriksson, Per Elofsson, Jörgen Brink)	1:32:12.8

== Women's cross-country ==
=== 1.5 km individual sprint ===
February 26, 2003

Medal	Athlete	Time
Gold	Marit Bjørgen (NOR)	3:28.8
Silver	Claudia Künzel (GER)	3:29.9
Bronze	Hilde Gjermundshaug Pedersen (NOR)	3:30.6

=== 10 km classical ===
February 20. 2003

Medal	Athlete	Time
Gold	Bente Skari (NOR)	25:47.0
Silver	Kristina Šmigun (EST)	26:08.0
Bronze	Hilde Gjermundshaug Pedersen (NOR)	26:16.7

=== 5 km + 5 km double pursuit ===
February 22, 2003

Medal	Athlete	Time
Gold	Kristina Šmigun (EST)	26:38.4
Silver	Evi Sachenbacher (GER)	26:39.0
Bronze	Olga Zavyalova (RUS)	26:39.0

Sachenbacher beat Zavyalova in a photo finish to earn the silver medal.

=== 15 km classical mass start ===
February 18, 2003

Medal	Athlete	Time
Gold	Bente Skari (NOR)	39:40.9
Silver	Kristina Šmigun (EST)	39:53.7
Bronze	Olga Zavyalova (RUS)	40:36.7

=== 30 km freestyle ===
February 28, 2003

Medal	Athlete	Time
Gold	Olga Zavyalova (RUS)	1:14:29.8
Silver	Yelena Burukhina (RUS)	1:14:45.1
Bronze	Kristina Šmigun (EST)	1:14:56.7

=== 4 × 5 km relay ===
February 24, 2003

Medal	Team	Time
Gold	Germany (Manuela Henkel, Viola Bauer, Claudia Künzel, Evi Sachenbacher)	50:54.7
Silver	Norway (Anita Moen, Marit Bjørgen, Hilde Gjermundshaug Pedersen, Vibeke Skofterud)	51:26.3
Bronze	Russia (Natalya Korostelyova, Olga Zavyalova, Yelena Burukhina, Nina Gavrylyuk)	52:06.3

The Finnish relay team finished second, but was disqualified when Kaisa Varis tested positive for doping.

== Men's Nordic combined ==
=== 7.5 km sprint ===
February 28, 2003

Medal	Athlete	Time
Gold	Johnny Spillane (USA)	18:47.8
Silver	Ronny Ackermann (GER)	18:49.1
Bronze	Felix Gottwald (AUT)	18:49.1

Spillane is the first American to win a gold medal in the FIS Nordic World Ski Championships. Ackermann beat Gottwald at the line to earn the silver medal.

=== 15 km Individual Gundersen ===
February 21, 2003

Medal	Athlete	Time
Gold	Ronny Ackermann (GER)	37:54.2
Silver	Felix Gottwald (AUT)	38:46.3
Bronze	Samppa Lajunen (FIN)	39:10.1

=== 4 × 5 km team ===
February 24, 2003

Medal	Team	Time
Gold	Austria (Michael Gruber, Wilhelm Denifl, Christoph Bieler, Felix Gottwald)	47:23.9
Silver	Germany (Thorsten Schmitt, Georg Hettich, Björn Kircheisen, Ronny Ackermann)	+ 12.6
Bronze	Finland (Hannu Manninen, Jouni Kaitainen, Jaakko Tallus, Samppa Lajunen)	+ 1:15.5

== Men's ski jumping ==
=== Individual normal hill ===
February 28, 2003

Medal	Athlete	Points
Gold	Adam Małysz (POL)	279.0
Silver	Tommy Ingebrigtsen (NOR)	263.0
Bronze	Noriaki Kasai (JPN)	259.5

=== Individual large hill ===
February 22, 2003

Medal	Athlete	Points
Gold	Adam Małysz (POL)	289.0
Silver	Matti Hautamäki (FIN)	286.5
Bronze	Noriaki Kasai (JPN)	273.2

=== Team large hill ===
February 23, 2003

Medal	Team	Points
Gold	Finland (Janne Ahonen, Tami Kiuru, Arttu Lappi, Matti Hautamäki)	1046.6
Silver	Japan (Kazuyoshi Funaki, Akira Higashi, Hideharu Miyahira, Noriaki Kasai)	1010.1
Bronze	Norway (Tommy Ingebrigtsen, Lars Bystøl, Sigurd Pettersen, Bjørn Einar Romøren)	991.9

== Medal table ==
Medal winners by nation. The host country, Italy, did not get any medals.

Rank	Nation	Gold	Silver	Bronze	Total
1	Norway (NOR)	5	5	6	16
2	Germany (GER)	3	5	0	8
3	Sweden (SWE)	2	1	3	6
4	Poland (POL)	2	0	0	2
5	Estonia (EST)	1	3	1	5
6	Russia (RUS)	1	1	3	5
7	Finland (FIN)	1	1	2	4
8	Austria (AUT)	1	1	1	3
9	Czech Republic (CZE)	1	0	0	1
9	United States (USA)	1	0	0	1
11	Japan (JPN)	0	1	2	3
Totals (11 entries)		18	18	18	54
