= Jouni Kaitainen =

Finnish Nordic combined skier (born 1980)

Medal record

Men's Nordic combined

World Championships
Bronze medal – third place	2003 Val di Fiemme	4 x 5 km team

Jouni Kaitainen (born 9 June 1980) is a Finnish Nordic combined skier who has competed since 1999. He won a bronze medal in the 4 x 5 km team event at the 2003 FIS Nordic World Ski Championships in Val di Fiemme and finished 19th in the 15 km individual at those same championships.

Kaitainen's best individual career finish was second in Austria in 1999 in the 15 km individual event.
