= Ulrich Wehling =

German skier

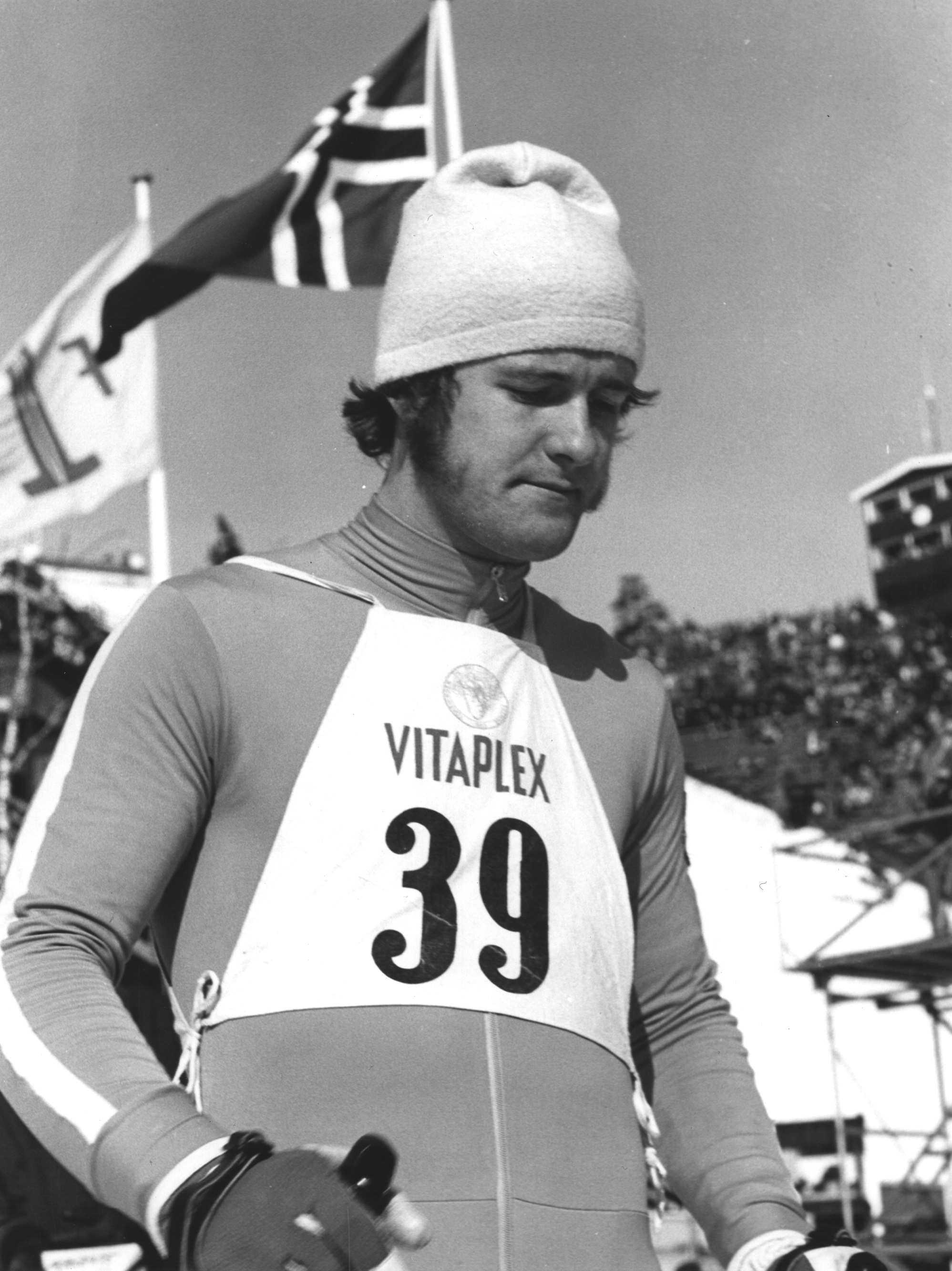
- Wehling in 1976

Medal record

Men's Nordic combined

Representing East Germany

Olympic Games
Gold medal – first place	1972 Sapporo	Individual
Gold medal – first place	1976 Innsbruck	Individual
Gold medal – first place	1980 Lake Placid	Individual

World Championships
Gold medal – first place	1974 Falun	Individual
Bronze medal – third place	1978 Lahti	Individual

Ulrich Wehling (born 8 July 1952 in Halle) is a retired German skier who won the Nordic combined event in the Winter Olympics three consecutive times, in 1972, 1976, and 1980. Wehling was the first man to win three consecutive gold medals in the same event at Winter Olympics but not the first Olympian to win three Gold in a winter discipline as Gillis Grafström had won a figure skating title at the Summer Olympics 1920 before winning twice at the first two Winter Olympics.

At the FIS Nordic World Ski Championships, Wehling won two Nordic combined medals with a gold in 1974 and a bronze in 1978. Wehling also won the Nordic combined at the Holmenkollen ski festival three straight years (1975–1977). For his successes in the Nordic combined, he received the Holmenkollen medal in 1976. He was a Stasi informer under the codename "Springer".

Wehling is currently FIS Race Director for the Nordic combined, a role he also did for the 2006 Winter Olympics in Turin and the FIS Nordic World Ski Championships 2007 in Sapporo. He now lives in Switzerland.

== Other successes ==
- 1971 junior European champion
- 1975 GDR masters
- 1976 GDR master
- 1977 GDR master
- 1978 GDR master
- 1979 GDR master
