= Christoph Eugen =

Austrian Nordic combined skier

Medal record

Men's Nordic combined

World Championships
Bronze medal – third place	1997 Trondheim	4 x 5 km team

Christoph Eugen (born 28 May 1976) is an Austrian Nordic combined skier who competed from 1993 to 2004. He won a bronze medal in the 4 x 5 km team event at the 1997 FIS Nordic World Ski Championships in Trondheim and had his best individual finish of 11th in the 15 km event at the 2001 championships.

Eugen finished 20th in the 15 km individual at the 2002 Winter Olympics in Salt Lake City. His best individual finish was second on three occasions (1993, 1994, 2003).
