= Nordic combined at the 2002 Winter Olympics =

Nordic Combined at the XIX Olympic Winter Games
- Venue: Park City (ski jumping); Soldier Hollow (cross-country skiing)
- Dates: February 9–22, 2002
- Competitors: 54 from 14 nations

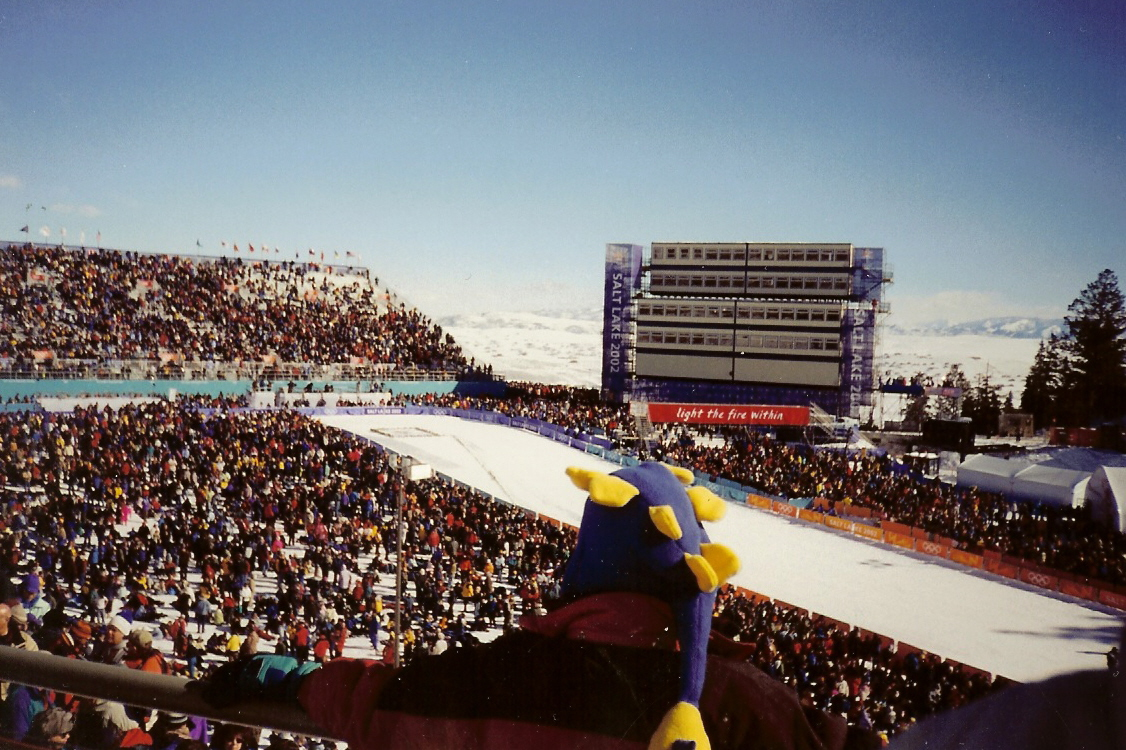
Nordic Combined cross-country skiing at Soldier Hollow.

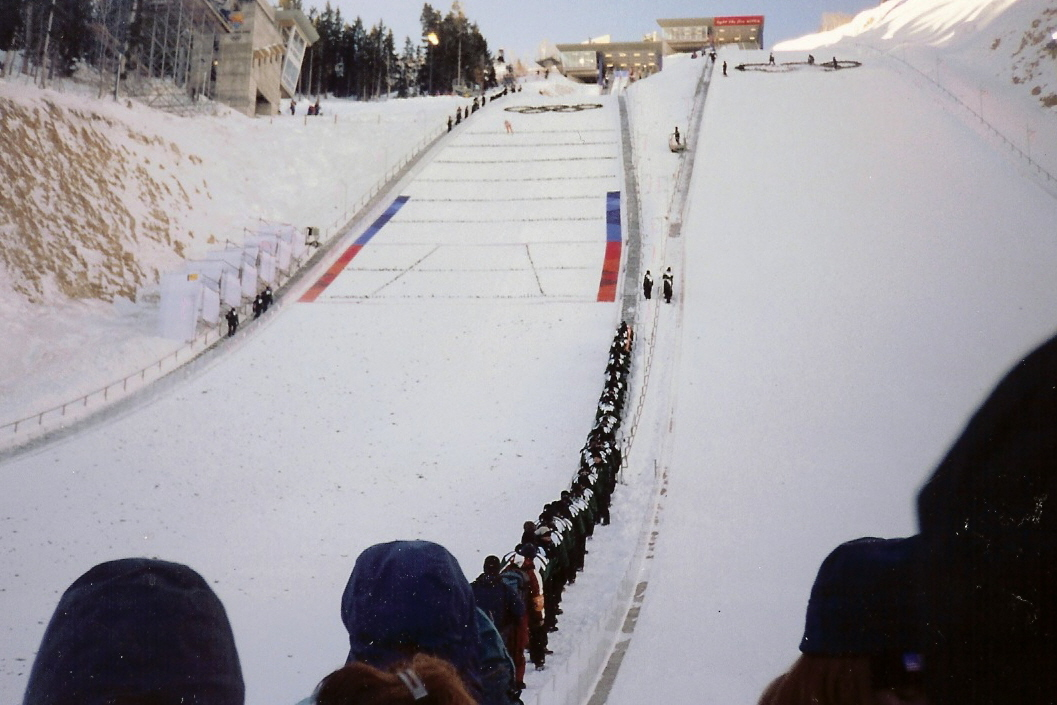
Nordic Combined ski jumping at Park City.

Nordic combined at the 2002 Winter Olympics, consisted of three events held over ten days, from 9 February to 22 February. The ski jumping part took place in Park City, while the cross-country part took place in Soldier Hollow. This was the first Winter Olympics to have two individual Nordic Combined events: the 7.5 km individual normal hill (sprint) and the 15 km individual large hill (individual).

== Medal summary ==
=== Medal table ===
| Rank | Nation | Gold | Silver | Bronze | Total |
|---|---|---|---|---|---|
| 1 | Finland | 3 | 1 | 0 | 4 |
| 2 | Germany | 0 | 2 | 0 | 2 |
| 3 | Austria | 0 | 0 | 3 | 3 |
| Totals (3 entries) | | 3 | 3 | 3 | 9 |

=== Events ===
| Event | Gold | | Silver | | Bronze | |
|---|---|---|---|---|---|---|
| Sprint | Samppa Lajunen; Finland | 16:40.1 | Ronny Ackermann; Germany | 16:49.1 | Felix Gottwald; Austria | 17:20.3 |
| Individual | Samppa Lajunen; Finland | 39:11.7 | Jaakko Tallus; Finland | 39:36.4 | Felix Gottwald; Austria | 40:06.5 |
| Team | Finland; Jari Mantila; Hannu Manninen; Jaakko Tallus; Samppa Lajunen | 48:42.2 | Germany; Björn Kircheisen; Georg Hettich; Marcel Höhlig; Ronny Ackermann | 48:49.7 | Austria; Christoph Bieler; Michael Gruber; Mario Stecher; Felix Gottwald | 48:53.2 |

== Participating NOCs ==
Fourteen nations participated in Nordic Combined at the Salt Lake Games.

- Austria (5)
- Belarus (1)
- Czech Republic (5)
- Estonia (2)
- Finland (5)
- France (4)
- Germany (6)
- Japan (5)
- Norway (5)
- Russia (4)
- Slovenia (1)
- Switzerland (6)
- Slovakia (1)
- United States (4)
