= Jens Gaiser =

German Nordic combined skier (born 1978)

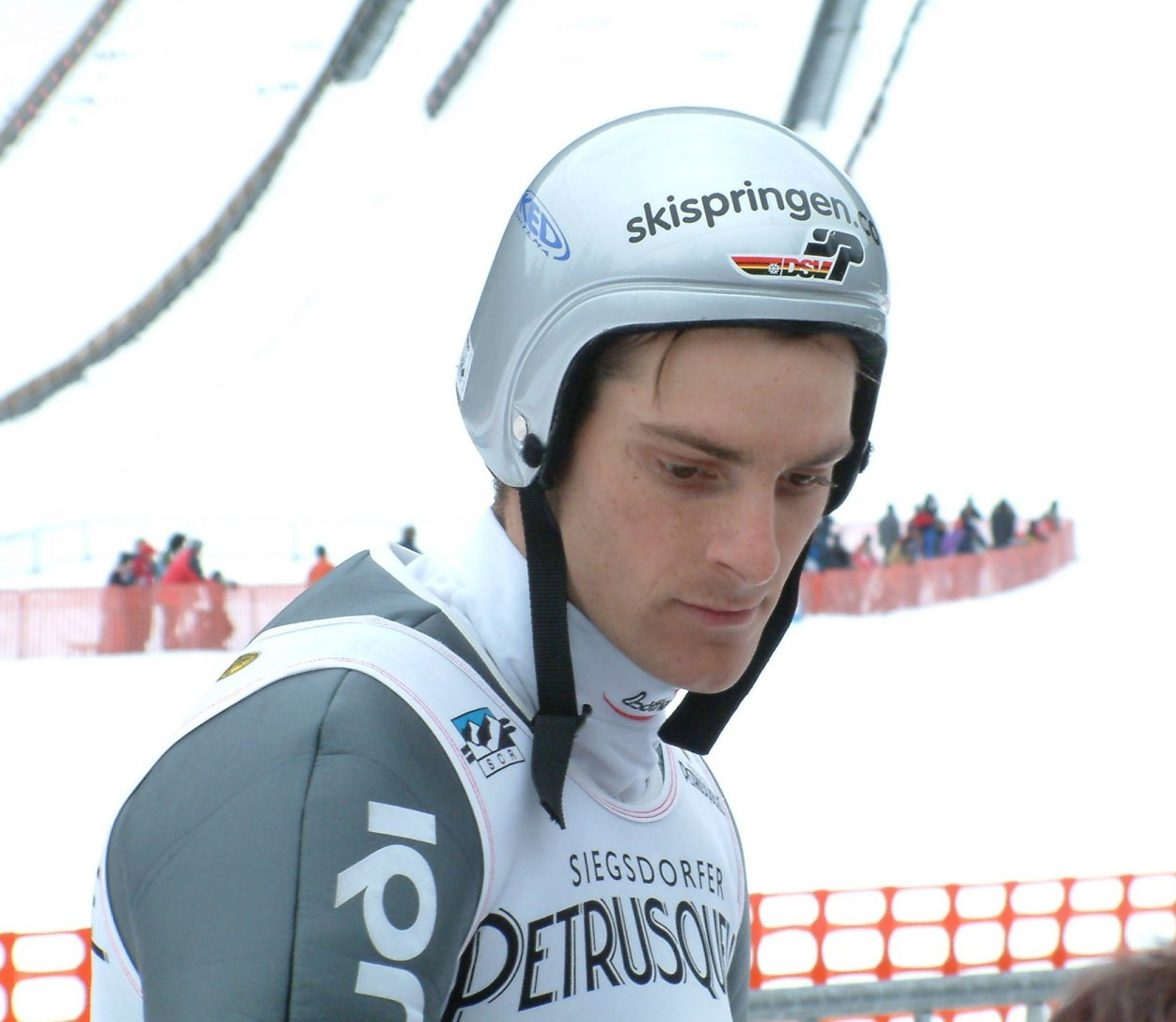

Medal record

Men's Nordic combined

Representing Germany

Olympic Games
Silver medal – second place	2006 Turin	4 x 5 km team

Jens Gaiser (born August 15, 1978 in Baiersbronn) is a German Nordic combined skier who has competed since 1998. He won a silver medal at the 2006 Winter Olympics in Turin in the 4 x 5 km team event. Gaiser also finished 19th in the 7.5 km sprint event at the 2002 Winter Olympics in Salt Lake City.

Gaiser's best finish at the FIS Nordic World Ski Championships was 31st in the 7.5 km sprint event at Ramsau in 1999. His best World Cup career finish was fourth in a 15 km individual event in Norway in 2001.
