= Michael Gruber (skier) =

Austrian Nordic combined skier (born 1979)

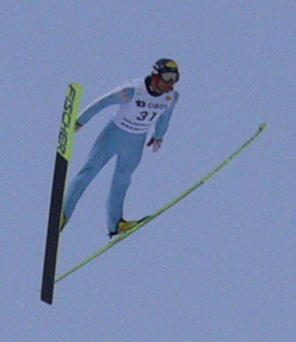

Medal record

Men's Nordic combined

Olympic Games
Gold medal – first place	2006 Turin	4 x 5 km team
Bronze medal – third place	2002 Salt Lake City	4 x 5 km team

World Championships
Gold medal – first place	2003 Val di Fiemme	4 x 5 km team
Bronze medal – third place	2005 Oberstdorf	4 x 5 km team

Michael Gruber (born 5 December 1979 in Schwarzach im Pongau) is an Austrian Nordic combined skier who competed from 1997 to 2008. He won a gold medal in the 4 x 5 km team event at the 2006 Winter Olympics in Turin.

Gruber won two 4 x 5 km team event medals at the FIS Nordic World Ski Championships with a gold in 2003 and a bronze in 2005. He has two individual career victories (1998: 7.5 km sprint, 2004: 15 km individual).

He retired after the 2007-08 season.
