= Petter Tande =

Norwegian former Nordic combined skier (born 1985)

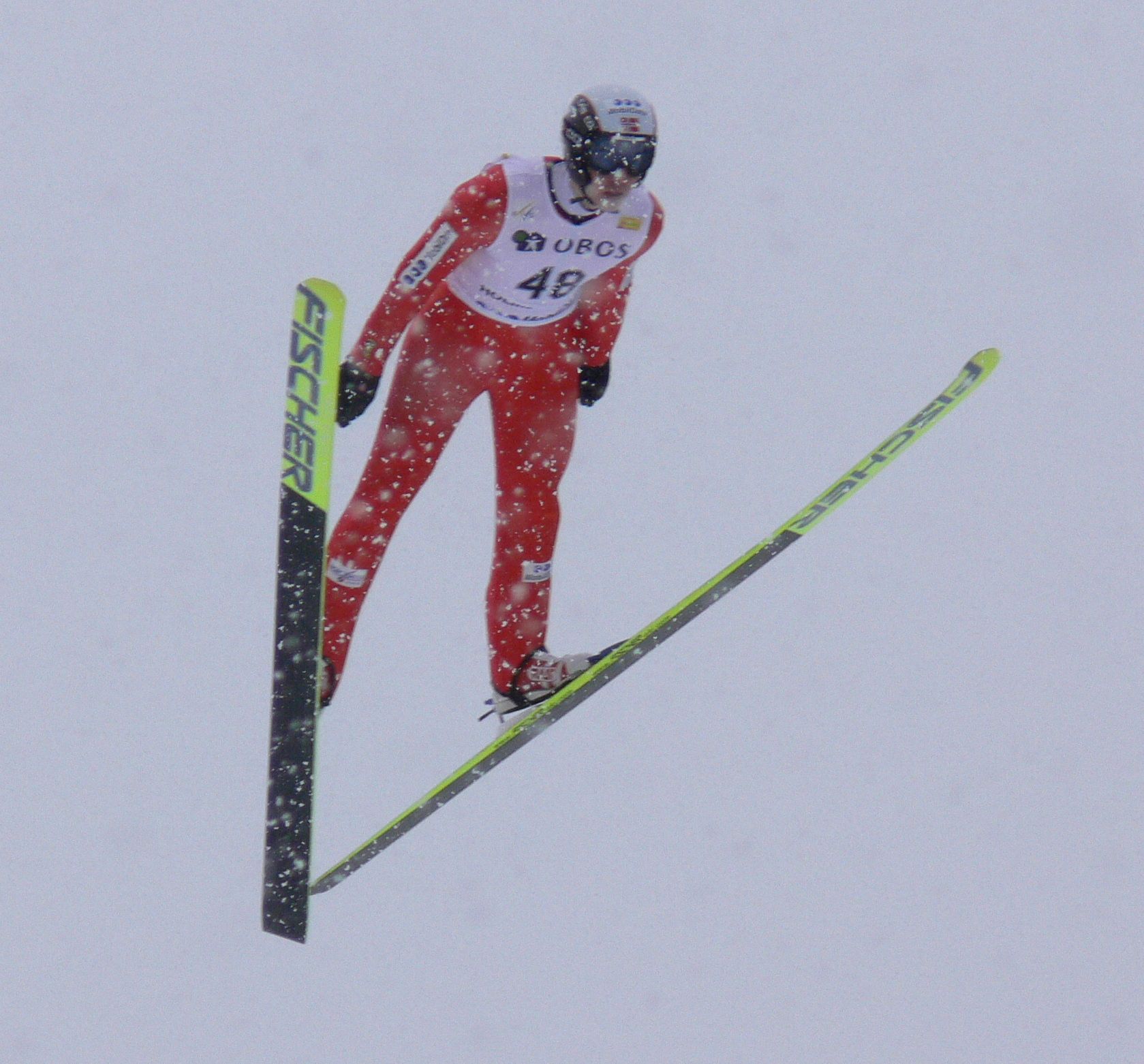

Personal information
- Full name: Petter Laukslett Tande
- Born: 11 June 1985 (age 41) Oslo, Norway

Sport
- Sport: Skiing
- Club: Byåsen IL

World Cup career
- Seasons: 2002-2011
- Indiv. podiums: 17
- Indiv. wins: 6
Medal record
Men's Nordic combined
Representing Norway
World Championships
Gold medal – first place	2005 Oberstdorf	4 x 5 km team
Bronze medal – third place	2007 Sapporo	4 x 5 km team
Bronze medal – third place	2009 Liberec	4 x 5 km team
- Updated on 26 November 2017

Petter Laukslett Tande (born 11 June 1985 in Oslo) is a Norwegian former Nordic combined skier who has been competing between 2002 and 2011, representing Byåsen IL. He has three medals in the 4 x 5 km team event at the FIS Nordic World Ski Championships, with a gold (2005) and two bronzes (2007, 2009).

Competing in two Winter Olympics, he earned his best finish of fourth in the 15 km individual event at Turin in 2006.

He has six career World Cup victories, including twice at the Holmenkollen ski festival (Individual: 2006, sprint: 2008).

== Personal information ==
Petter Tande is 180 cm, weighs 68 kg. His birthday is the same as the Norwegian Queen. He has got blue eyes and brown hair. He loves watching movies, including Pirates of the Caribbean, and anything of action and western movies. His favourite actor is Johnny Depp. His family consists of mom Marianne and dad Torbjørn, and sister Ina Laukslett Tande.
