= Kenneth Braaten =

Norwegian Nordic combined skier

Medal record

Men's Nordic combined

Representing Norway

Olympic Games
Gold medal – first place	1998 Nagano	4 x 5 km team

World Championships
Gold medal – first place	2001 Lahti	4 x 5 km team
Silver medal – second place	1999 Ramsau	4 x 5 km team

Kenneth Braaten (born 24 September 1974) is a Norwegian Nordic combined skier who competed from 1994 to 2005. He won the 4 x 5 km team event at the 1998 Winter Olympics in Nagano. Braaten also won two medals in the 4 x 5 km team event at the FIS Nordic World Ski Championships with a gold in 2001 and a silver in 1999.
