= Kristian Hammer =

Norwegian Nordic combined skier (born 1976)

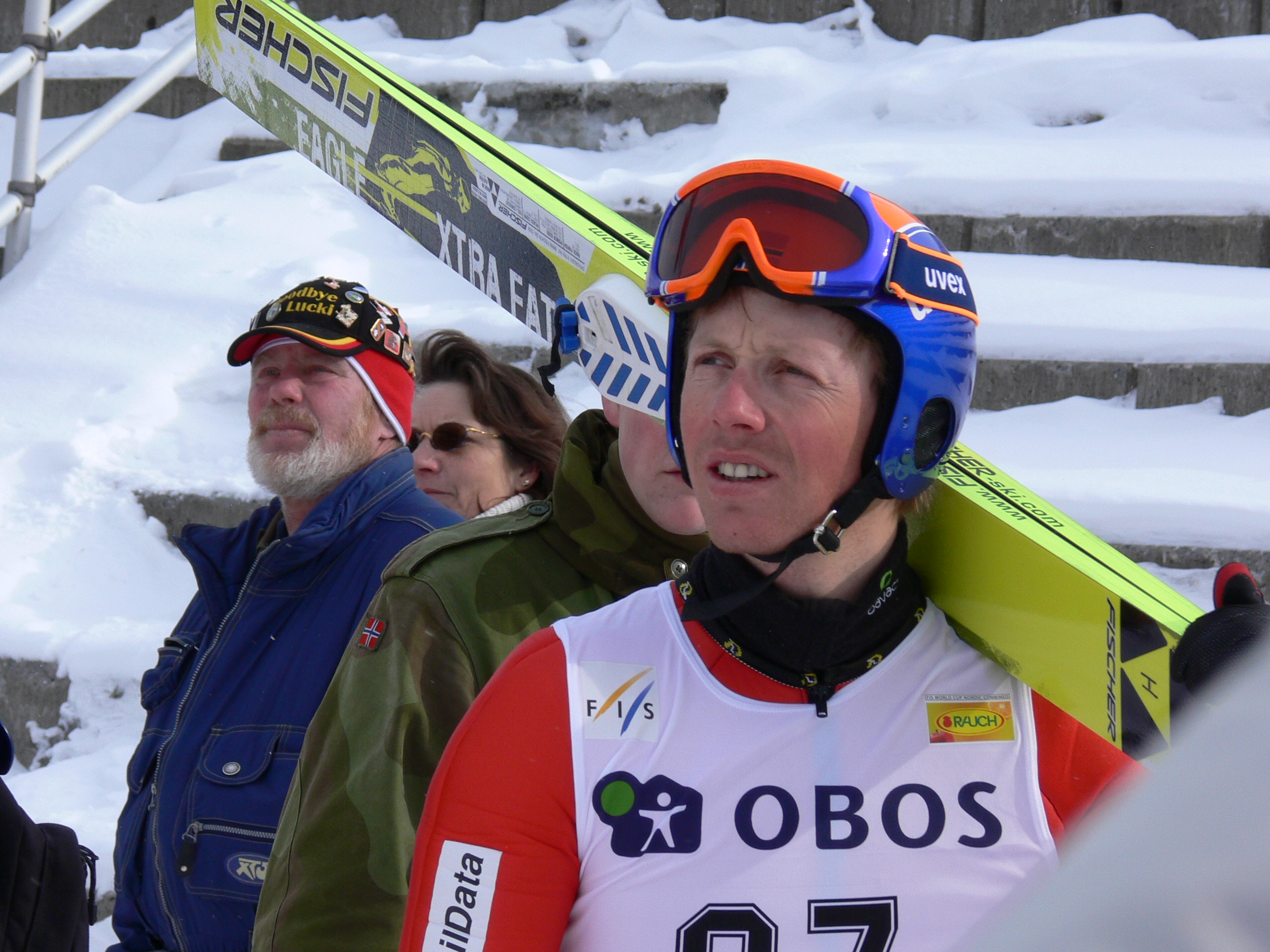

Medal record

Men's Nordic combined

World Championships
Gold medal – first place	2001 Lahti	4 x 5 km team
Gold medal – first place	2005 Oberstdorf	4 x 5 km team
Bronze medal – third place	2005 Oberstdorf	7.5 km sprint

Kristian Hammer (born 20 March 1976 in Narvik) is a Norwegian Nordic combined skier who has been competing since 1995 while representing Eidsvoll IL. He grew up on Setermoen in Bardu Municipality.

Hammer has three medals at the FIS Nordic World Ski Championships with two golds (4 x 5 km team: 2001, 2005) and one bronze (7.5 km sprint: 2005). His best individual finish at the Winter Olympics was 8th in the 15 km individual event at Salt Lake City in 2002.

Hammer has a total of eight individual victories in both 7.5 km sprint and 15 km individual from 1999 to 2001. He is currently the head coach of the Norwegian Nordic Combined national team.
