= Ronny Ackermann =

German Nordic combined skier

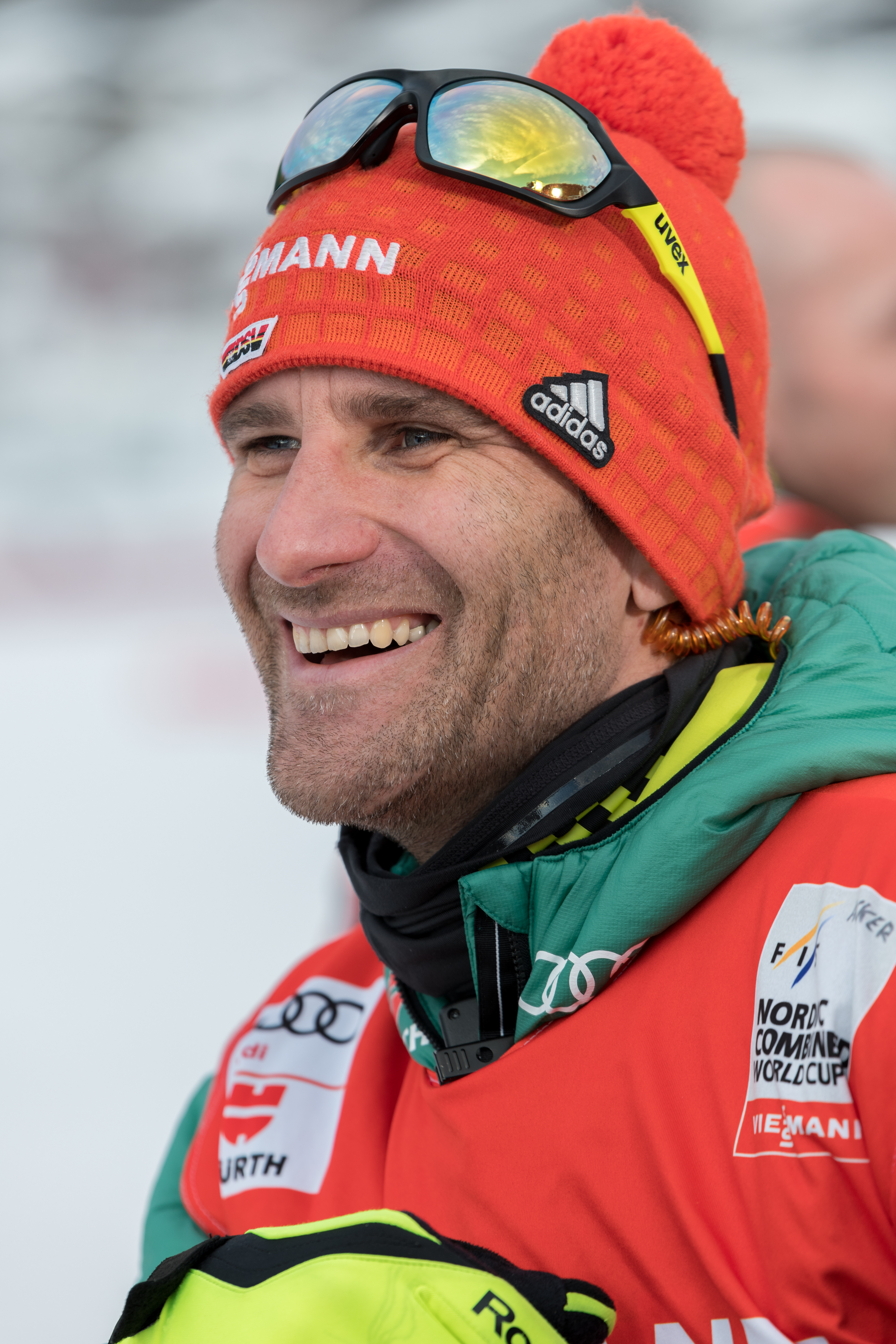

Personal information
- Full name: Ronny Ackermann
- Born: 16 May 1977 (age 49) Bad Salzungen, East Germany

Sport
- Sport: Skiing
- Club: Rhöner WSV Dermbach

World Cup career
- Seasons: 1995-2010
- Indiv. starts: 178
- Indiv. podiums: 77
- Indiv. wins: 28
- Overall titles: 3 (2002, 2003, 2008)
Medal record
Men's Nordic combined
Olympic Games
| Silver medal – second place | 2002 Salt Lake City | 4 x 5 km team |
| Silver medal – second place | 2002 Salt Lake City | 7.5 km sprint |
| Silver medal – second place | 2006 Turin | 4 x 5 km team |
World Championships
| Gold medal – first place | 2003 Val di Fiemme | 15 km individual |
| Gold medal – first place | 2005 Oberstdorf | 15 km individual |
| Gold medal – first place | 2005 Oberstdorf | 7.5 km sprint |
| Gold medal – first place | 2007 Sapporo | 15 km individual |
| Silver medal – second place | 2003 Val di Fiemme | 4 x 5 km team |
| Silver medal – second place | 2003 Val di Fiemme | 7.5 km sprint |
| Silver medal – second place | 2005 Oberstdorf | 4 x 5 km team |
| Silver medal – second place | 2007 Sapporo | 4 x 5 km team |
| Silver medal – second place | 2009 Liberec | 4 x 5 km team |
| Bronze medal – third place | 2001 Lahti | 7.5 km sprint |

Ronny Ackermann (German pronunciation: [ˈʁɔni ˈakɐˌman]; born 16 May 1977 in Bad Salzungen, Bezirk Suhl) is a German former Nordic combined skier.

Ackermann started to learn to ski when he was five years old and took up ski-jumping two years later. As of 2004, he belongs to the team of Rhöner WSV Dermbach. His many successes include winning the Nordic combined World Cup in 2002, 2003 and 2008.

Ackermann found success in the FIS Nordic World Ski Championships, winning ten medals, including four golds (15 km individual: 2003, 2005, 2007; 7.5 km sprint: 2005), five silvers (7.5 km sprint: 2003, 4 x 5 km team: 2003, 2005, 2007, 2009), and a bronze (7.5 km sprint: 2001.) He also has won three silvers at the Winter Olympics in the sprint (2002) and team (2002, 2006) events. Ackermann is the first person to win the 15 km individual World Championships three straight times and the first to do it at the World Championships or Winter Olympic level since fellow (East) German Ulrich Wehling did it during the Winter Olympics of 1972, 1976, 1980.

Ackermann has also won the Nordic combined event at the Holmenkollen ski festival three times, with 2 wins in the individual competition (2002, 2004) and a win in the sprint competition (2003). In 2003, Ackermann received the Holmenkollen medal (shared with Felix Gottwald).

He was elected Sportler des Jahres (Sportsman of the Year) in 2005.

Awards
| Preceded by (Germany) Michael Schumacher | German Sportsman of the Year; 2005 | Succeeded by (Germany) Michael Greis |
