= Christoph Bieler =

Austrian Nordic combined skier (born 1977)

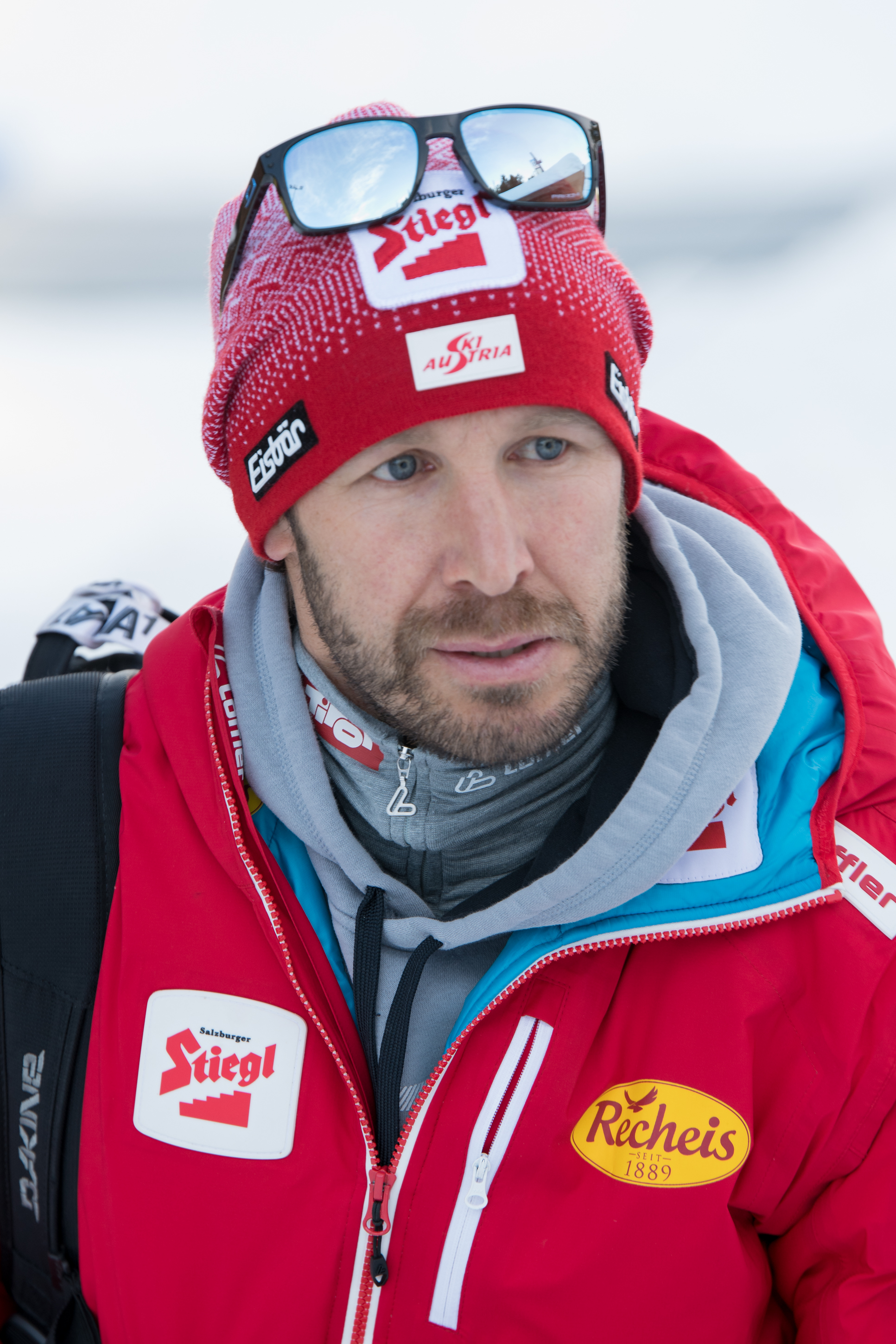

Personal information
- Born: 28 October 1977 (age 49) Hall in Tirol, Austria

Sport
- Sport: Skiing
- Club: HSV Absam-Bergisel

World Cup career
- Seasons: 1996-2015
- Indiv. starts: 247
- Indiv. podiums: 17
- Indiv. wins: 6
Medal record
Men's Nordic combined
Olympic Games
Gold medal – first place	2006 Turin	4 x 5 km team
Bronze medal – third place	2002 Salt Lake City	4 x 5 km team
Bronze medal – third place	2014 Sochi	4 x 5 km team
World Championships
Gold medal – first place	2003 Val di Fiemme	4 x 5 km team
Bronze medal – third place	2005 Oberstdorf	4 x 5 km team

Christoph Bieler (born 28 October 1977 in Hall in Tirol) is an Austrian former Nordic combined athlete. Competing in four Winter Olympics, he won two medals in the 4 x 5 km team event with a gold in 2006 and a bronze medal in 2002. Bieler's best individual Winter Olympic finish was tenth in the 10 km individual large hill event at Vancouver in 2010.

He also won two 4 x 5 km team medals at the FIS Nordic World Ski Championships with gold in 2003 and bronze in 2005, and had his best individual finish of sixth twice (10 km mass start: 2009, 15 km individual: 2003).

Bieler has four individual victories since 2006.
