= Sebastian Haseney =

German Nordic combined skier

Medal record

Nordic combined

World Championships
Silver medal – second place	2005 Oberstdorf	4 x 5 km team
Silver medal – second place	2007 Sapporo	4 x 5 km team

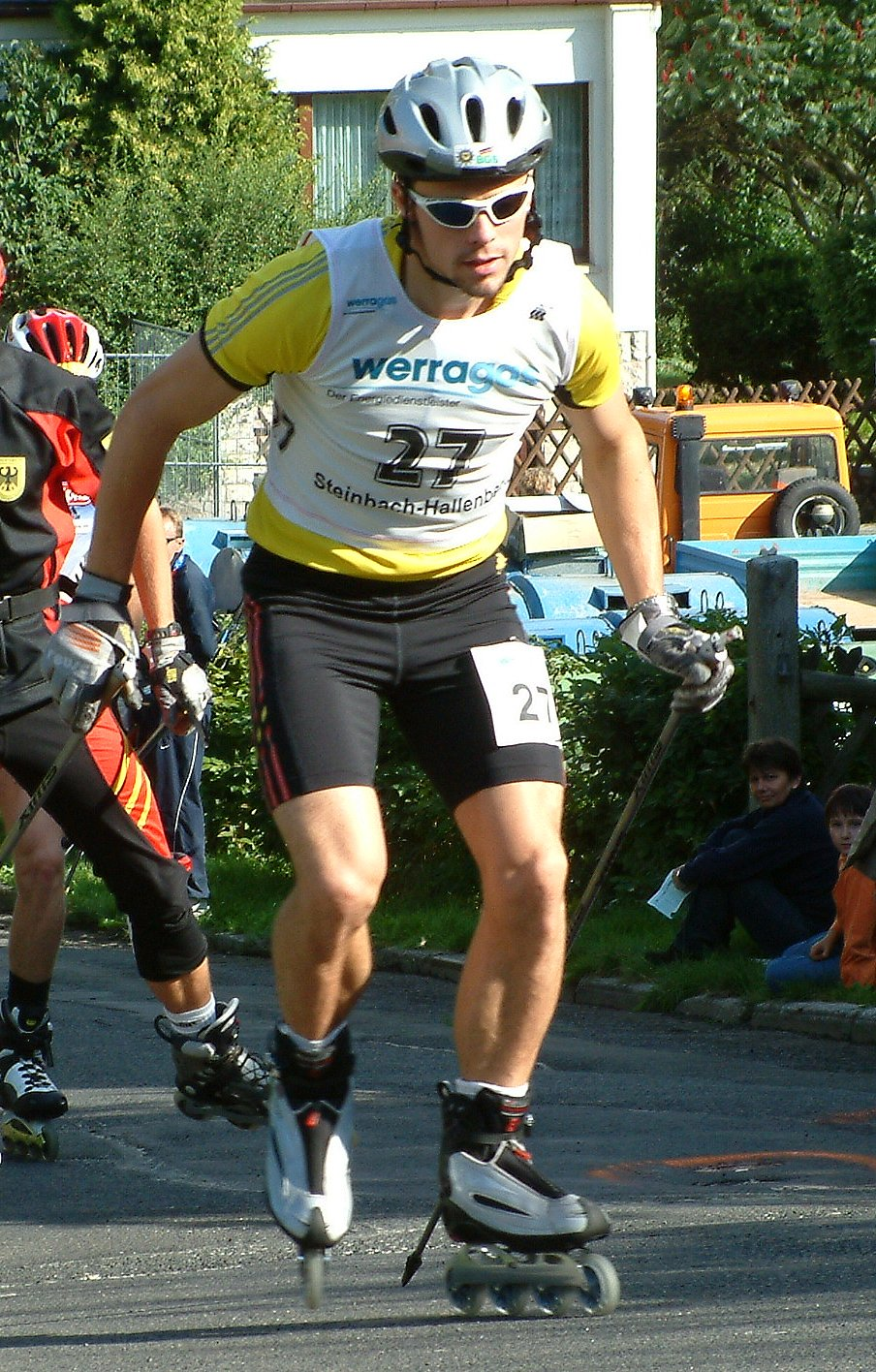
Sebastian Haseney

Sebastian Haseney (born August 27, 1978, in Suhl) is a former German Nordic combined skier who has competed since 1999. He won two silver medals in the 4 x 5 km team event at the FIS Nordic World Ski Championships (2005, 2007) and finished 8th in the 15 km individual event at the 1999 championships.

Haseney finished 6th in the 15 km individual event at the 2002 Winter Olympics in Salt Lake City. His two individual career victories were in two 7.5 km sprint events at Lake Placid, New York, in 1999 and at Val di Fiemme in 2008.

In January 2011 Haseney finished his career.
