= Georg Hettich =

German Nordic combined skier

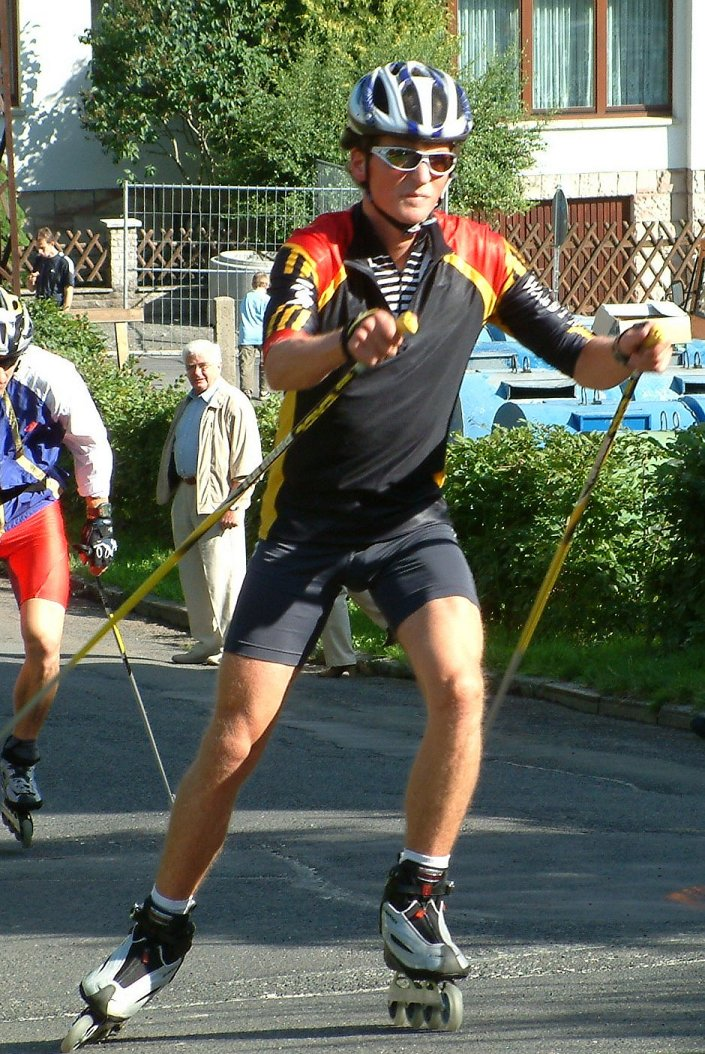

Medal record

Men's Nordic combined

Representing Germany

Olympic Games
Gold medal – first place	2006 Turin	15 km individual
Silver medal – second place	2002 Salt Lake City	4 x 5 km team
Silver medal – second place	2006 Turin	4 x 5 km team
Bronze medal – third place	2006 Turin	7.5 km sprint

World Championships
Silver medal – second place	2003 Val di Fiemme	4 x 5 km team
Silver medal – second place	2005 Oberstdorf	4 x 5 km team

Georg Hettich (born 12 October 1978 in Furtwangen im Schwarzwald, Baden-Württemberg) is a Nordic combined skier and Olympic medalist from Germany.

Hettich was a surprise winner of the 15 km individual event at the 2006 Winter Olympics. At the 2002 Winter Olympics, he won a silver medal in the 4 x 5 km team event and repeated this in 2006. With his bronze in the 7.5 km sprint contest in 2006, he completed his medal collection.

Hettich also won silver medals at the FIS Nordic World Ski Championships in the 4 x 5 km team event both in 2003 and 2005.
