= Ještěd ski jumping hills =

Ski hill in Liberec, Czechia

Coordinates: 50°44′05″N 14°59′48″E

Ještěd
- Ještěd A, Ještěd B
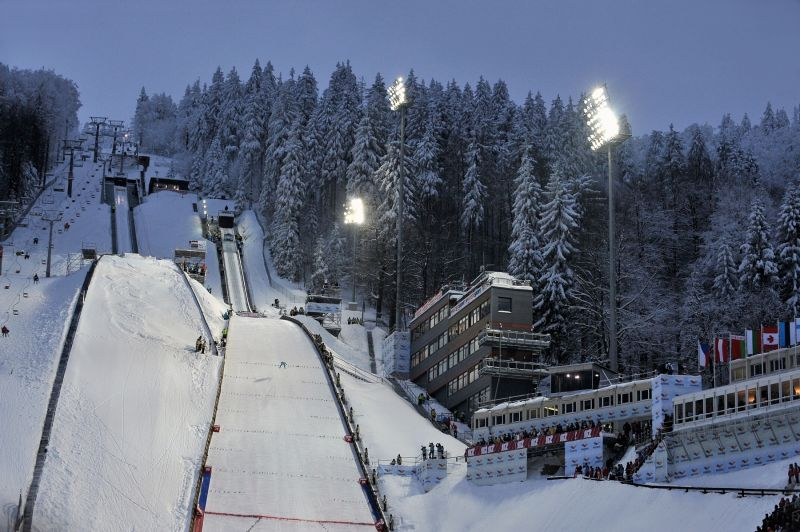
- Location: Ještěd; Liberec; Czech Republic
- Opened: 1966
- Renovated: 2007-2009

Size
- K–point: K-90; K-120
- Hill record: (Finland) Harri Olli (104.5 m in 2009) (Finland) Janne Ahonen (139.0 m in 2004)

Top events
- World Championships: 2009

Ještěd A is a ski jumping hill, located in Liberec, Czech Republic. FIS Nordic World Ski Championships 2009 was held there. The K-spot is located at 120 metres. The hill size is 134 m.

Ještěd B is a ski jumping hill, located in Liberec, Czech Republic. FIS Nordic World Ski Championships 2009 was held there. The K-spot is located at 90 metres. The hill size is 100 m.
