= Samppa Lajunen =

Finnish Nordic combined skier (born 1979)

Samppa Kalevi Lajunen
Personal information
- Nationality: Finland
- Born: 23 April 1979 (age 47) Turku, Finland
- Height: 1.77 m (5 ft 10 in)

Sport
- Sport: Skiing
- Club: Jyväskylän Hiihtoseura

World Cup career
- Seasons: 1995–2004
- Indiv. starts: 113
- Indiv. podiums: 55
- Indiv. wins: 20
- Overall titles: 2 (1997, 2000)
Medal record
Men's Nordic combined
Representing Finland
Olympic Games
| Gold medal – first place | 2002 Salt Lake City | 15 km individual |
| Gold medal – first place | 2002 Salt Lake City | 7.5 km sprint |
| Gold medal – first place | 2002 Salt Lake City | 4 × 5 km team |
| Silver medal – second place | 1998 Nagano | 15 km individual |
| Silver medal – second place | 1998 Nagano | 4 × 5 km team |
World Championships
| Gold medal – first place | 1999 Ramsau | 4 × 5 km team |
| Silver medal – second place | 1997 Trondheim | 4 × 5 km team |
| Silver medal – second place | 1999 Ramsau | 15 km individual |
| Silver medal – second place | 2001 Lahti | 15 km individual |
| Silver medal – second place | 2001 Lahti | 7.5 km sprint |
| Bronze medal – third place | 2001 Lahti | 4 × 5 km team |
| Bronze medal – third place | 2003 Val di Fiemme | 15 km individual |
| Bronze medal – third place | 2003 Val di Fiemme | 4 × 5 km team |

Samppa Lajunen (born 23 April 1979 in Turku) is a retired Finnish Winter Olympic Games gold medalist, entrepreneur, and investor. At the 2002 Winter Olympics, he became the first athlete to sweep the gold medals at all three Nordic combined events, a feat that was only equalished by Jens Lurås Oftebro twenty four years later at the 2026 Winter Olympics

== Athletic career ==
A winner of five Winter Olympic Games medals, his career highlight came at the 2002 Winter Olympics in Salt Lake City when Lajunen won all three gold medals in the Nordic combined events. He also won silver medals at the 1998 Winter Olympics in Nagano in both the 15 km individual and 4 × 5 km team events.

Lajunen also found success at the FIS Nordic World Ski Championships, winning eight medals. This included one gold (4 × 5 km team: 1999), four silvers (15 km individual: 1999, 2001; 4 × 5 km team: 1997, 7.5 km sprint: 2001); and three bronzes (15 km individual: 2003, 4 × 5 km team: 2001, 2003).

Lajunen ended his career after the season 2003/2004 at a quite early age, 24 years old.

== Education ==
Lajunen concentrated on his studies at the University of Jyväskylä. In the spring of 2007 he graduated with a master's degree in Economics and business administration.

== Samla Capital ==
In 2015, Lajunen founded Samla Capital. The company focuses on professional real estate investing, managing four funds with nearly 400 investors and assets totaling around 254 million euros. Its investment strategy targets real estate in growing cities and includes business premises, apartments, and hotels.

Samla Capital operates alternative investment funds such as Samla Toimitilat Ky and Samla Asunnot Ky, which invest in premises and apartments respectively, with properties mainly in Finnish growth centers.

=== Hotel Maria ===
Lajunen founded Samla Capital in 2015. Lajunen's company bought the block located on Mariankatu, Liisankatu, and Maneesikatu in Helsinki in 2020. Lajunen announced the start of construction of the new hotel together with the construction company Fira in January 2023. Lajunen and the construction company stated that the construction project would proceed in phases during 2023–2024. The hotel investment cost was about 116 million euros, with funding coming from London.

In September 2024, Helsingin Sanomat reported that the hotel had run into financial difficulties. The investors of Hotel Maria learned on January 30, 2025, that the hotel's largest lender wanted to sell the hotel. Selling the hotel would have meant that the investors would lose their money. On July 4, it was announced that the hotel had been sold to Michael Kum's M&L Hospitality Group based in Singapore, and the hotel transitioned under Hilton's Waldorf Astoria brand. Lajunen's Samla Capital made significant financial losses.
