= Jaakko Tallus =

Finnish Nordic combined skier

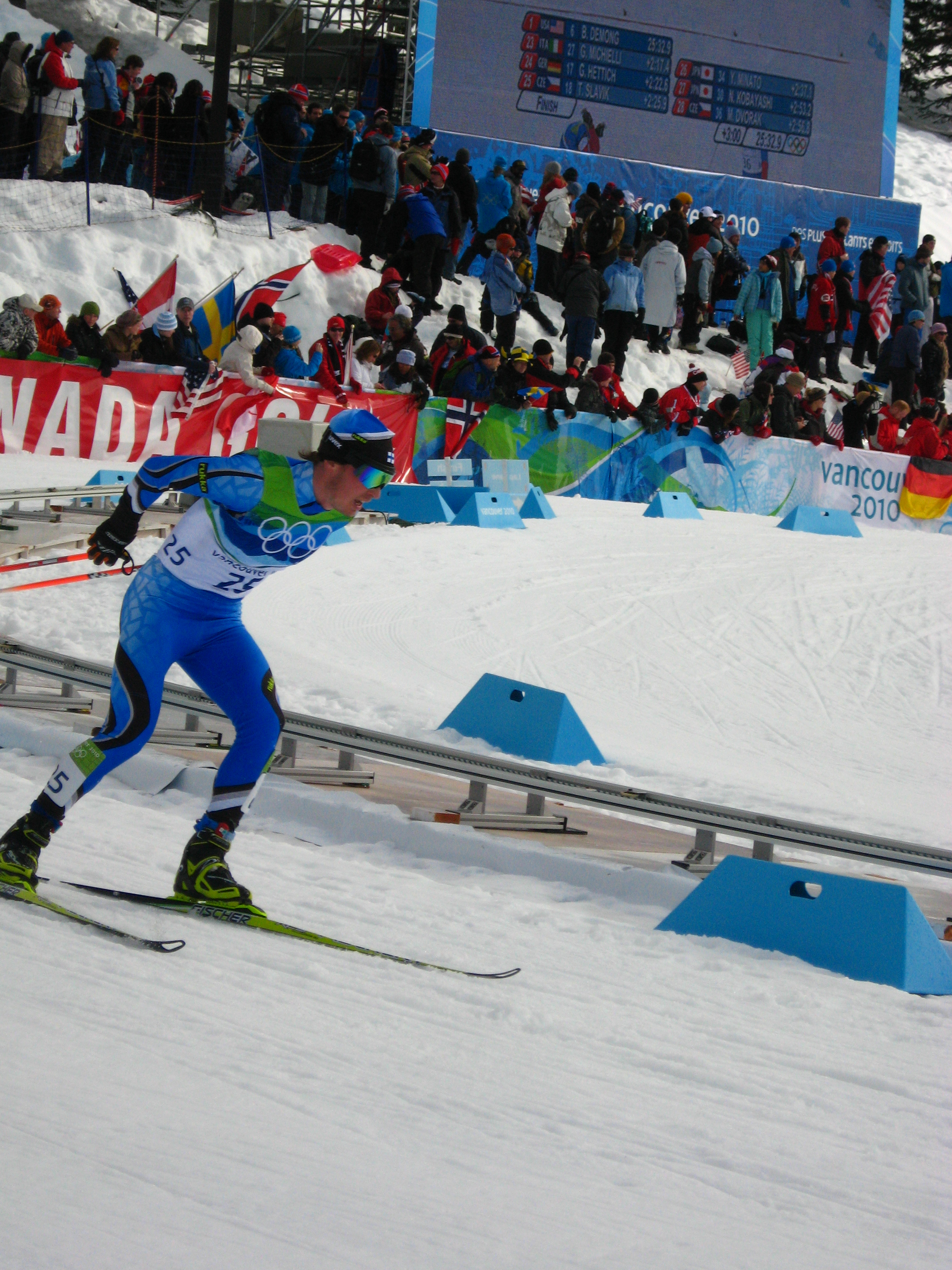
- Jaakko Tallus at the 2010 Winter Olympics

Medal record

Men's Nordic combined

Representing Finland

Olympic Games
Gold medal – first place	2002 Salt Lake City	4 x 5 km team
Silver medal – second place	2002 Salt Lake City	15 km individual
Bronze medal – third place	2006 Turin	4 x 5 km team

World Championships
Gold medal – first place	2007 Sapporo	4 x 5 km team
Bronze medal – third place	2001 Lahti	4 x 5 km team
Bronze medal – third place	2003 Val di Fiemme	4 x 5 km team

Jaakko Tapio Tallus (born 23 February 1981 in Lieksa) is a Nordic combined athlete from Finland who won gold (4 x 5 km team) and silver (15 km individual) medals at the 2002 Winter Olympics and a bronze (4 x 5 km team) medal at the 2006 Winter Olympics. He also earned three medals at the FIS Nordic World Ski Championships in the 4 x 5 km team events with one gold (2007) and two bronze (2001, 2003).

Tallus has three individual career victories, all earned in Finland in 1998. He also has three World Cup victories in team events between 2001 and 2007.
