= Felix Gottwald =

Austrian Nordic combined skier

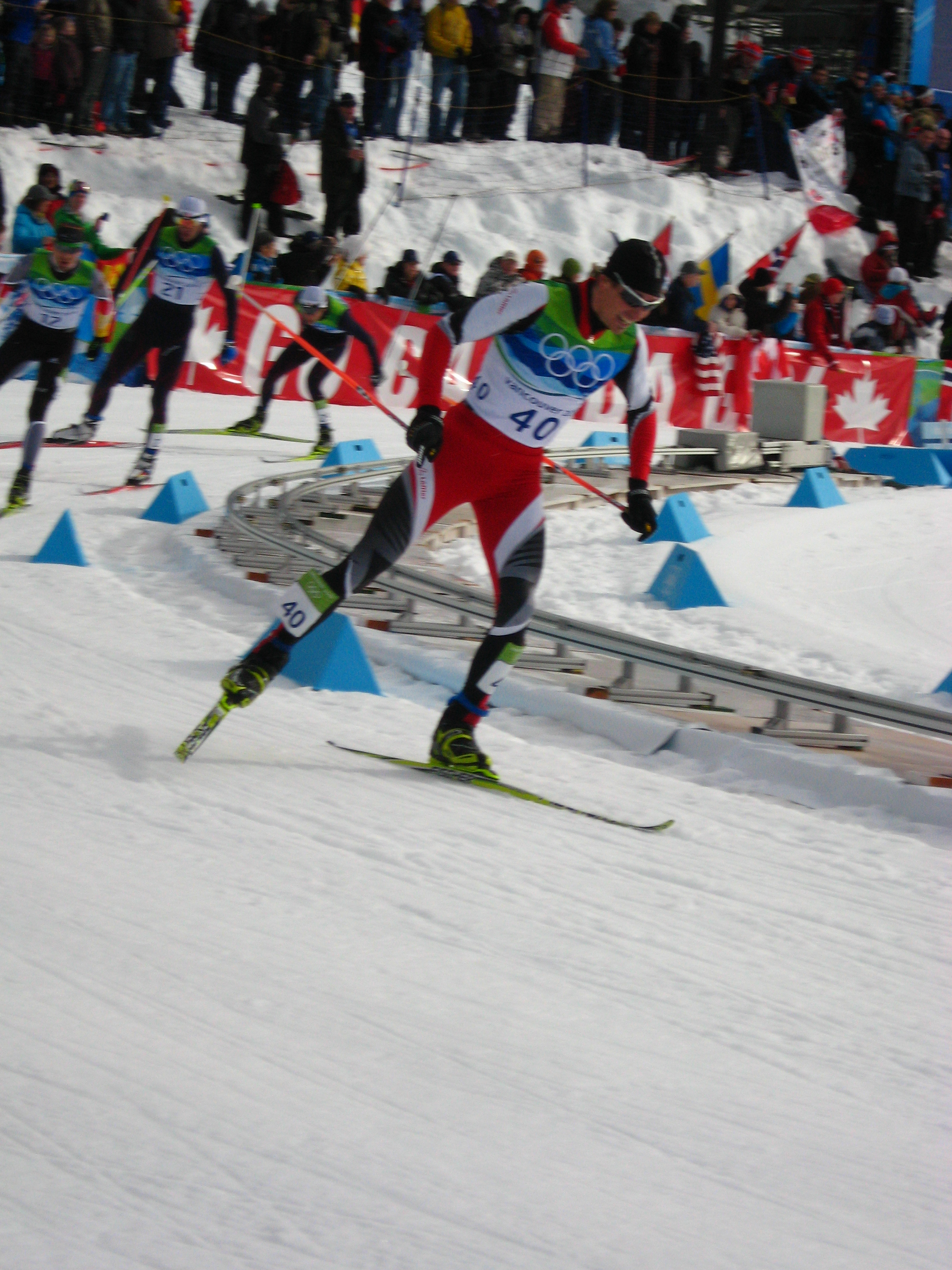
- Gottwald at the 2010 Winter Olympics

Personal information
- Nationality: Austria
- Born: 13 January 1976 (age 50) Zell am See, Austria
- Height: 1.79 m (5 ft 10 in)

Sport
- Sport: Skiing
- Club: Jyväskylän Hiihtoseura

World Cup career
- Seasons: 1993–2011
- Indiv. starts: 198
- Indiv. podiums: 68
- Indiv. wins: 23
- Overall titles: 1 (2001)
Medal record
Men's Nordic combined
Representing Austria
Olympic Games
Gold medal – first place	2006 Turin	7.5 km sprint
Gold medal – first place	2006 Turin	4 x 5 km team
Gold medal – first place	2010 Vancouver	4 x 5 km team
Silver medal – second place	2006 Turin	15 km individual
Bronze medal – third place	2002 Salt Lake City	7.5 km sprint
Bronze medal – third place	2002 Salt Lake City	15 km individual
Bronze medal – third place	2002 Salt Lake City	4 x 5 km team
World Championships
Gold medal – first place	2003 Val di Fiemme	4 x 5 km team
Gold medal – first place	2011 Oslo	4 x 5 km team normal hill
Gold medal – first place	2011 Oslo	4 x 5 km team large hill
Silver medal – second place	2001 Lahti	4 x 5 km team
Silver medal – second place	2003 Val di Fiemme	15 km individual
Bronze medal – third place	1997 Trondheim	4 x 5 km team
Bronze medal – third place	2001 Lahti	15 km individual
Bronze medal – third place	2003 Val di Fiemme	7.5 km sprint
Bronze medal – third place	2005 Oberstdorf	15 km individual
Bronze medal – third place	2005 Oberstdorf	4 x 5 km team
Bronze medal – third place	2011 Oslo	10 km individual

Felix Gottwald (born 13 January 1976 in Zell am See, Austria, now resides in Salzburg, Austria) is an Austrian Nordic combined athlete who competed from 1994 to 2007 and then returned to compete in 2009. He is 5 ft 10 in (178 cm), weighing 150 lb (10 st 10 lb; 68 kg).

Gottwald made his Olympic debut as an 18-year-old in the 15 km individual event at the 1994 Winter Olympics, then competed in the 4 x 5 km team and 15 km individual events at the 1998 Winter Olympics. Gottwald won bronze medals in the 7.5 km sprint, 15 km individual and 4 x 5 km team Nordic combined events at the 2002 Winter Olympics. Coming into the 2006 Winter Olympics in Turin, he had regularly ranked among the top three in the world. He won golds in the 7.5 km sprint and 4 x 5 km team competitions, and took silver in the 15 km individual. At the 2010 Winter Olympics, Gottwald won gold in the 4 x 5 km team event. He is the most decorated Nordic combined skier at the Winter Olympics with seven medals.

Gottwald topped the World Cup standings in 2001, and was a member of the Austrian team that won gold at the 2003 FIS Nordic World Ski Championships. Eight years later, at the 2011 World Championships in Oslo, he was again part of the Austrian team that became team world champion both in the normal hill and in the large hill competition. He also has two silvers (4 x 5 km team: 2001, 15 km individual: 2003) and six bronzes (15 km individual: 2001, 2005, 7.5 km sprint: 2003, normal hill: 2011, 4 x 5 km team: 1997, 2005) from the World Championships. So he is also the most decorated Nordic combined skier at World Championships with eleven medals.

Gottwald also has won twice at the Holmenkollen ski festival in the Nordic combined (2001, 2003 individual). He also won the Holmenkollen medal in 2003 (shared with Ronny Ackermann).

Gottwald retired at the end of the 2006-07 World Cup. He chose to return from retirement in May 2009, in order to compete in another season, including the Olympics. Prior to that he was working for an Austrian television network as a color commentator.

After the Olympic season he added another one, and with his victories in Kuusamo (27 November 2010) and Schonach (8 January 2011) he became the oldest winner of a Nordic combined competition.

== See also ==
- Felix Gottwald Ski Jumping Stadium
