= Nordic combined at the 1992 Winter Olympics – Team =

Team at the XVI Olympic Winter Games
- Venue: Courchevel (ski jumping); Les Saisies (cross-country skiing)
- Dates: 17–18 February
- Competitors: 33 from 11 nations
- Winning time: Team jump: 645.1; Ski time: 1:23:36.5; Final time: 1:23:36.5

Medalists
1st place, gold medalist(s)		Reiichi Mikata; Takanori Kono; Kenji Ogiwara	Japan
2nd place, silver medalist(s)		Knut Tore Apeland; Fred Børre Lundberg; Trond Einar Elden	Norway
3rd place, bronze medalist(s)		Klaus Ofner; Stefan Kreiner; Klaus Sulzenbacher	Austria

The men's team Nordic combined competition for the 1992 Winter Olympics in Albertville was held at Courchevel and Les Saisies on 16 and 17 February.

== Results ==
=== Ski jumping ===
Each of the three team members performed three jumps, with the top two scores counting. The scores for each team were combined and used to calculate their deficit in the cross-country skiing portion of the event. Each point difference between teams in the ski jumping portion in this event resulted in a six-second difference in the cross country part of the event.

Rank	Team	Points	Time difference
1	Japan; Reiichi Mikata; Takanori Kono; Kenji Ogiwara	645.1; 218.6; 199.0; 227.5	+0:00
2	Austria; Klaus Ofner; Stefan Kreiner; Klaus Sulzenbacher	615.6; 195.5; 212.6; 207.5	+2:27
3	Germany; Hans-Peter Pohl; Jens Deimel; Thomas Dufter	609.7; 180.1; 207.4; 222.2	+2:57
4	United States; Joe Holland; Tim Tetreault; Ryan Heckman	591.3; 184.3; 198.1; 208.9	+4:29
5	France; Francis Reppelin; Sylvain Guillaume; Fabrice Guy	578.4; 177.2; 191.1; 210.1	+5:33
6	Norway; Knut Tore Apeland; Fred Børre Lundberg; Trond Einar Elden	569.9; 185.3; 185.7; 198.9	+6:16
7	Finland; Pasi Saapunki; Jari Mantila; Teemu Summanen	561.2; 195.2; 166.4; 199.6	+6:59
8	Czechoslovakia; Josef Kovařík; Milan Kučera; František Máka	546.7; 166.0; 184.5; 196.2	+8:12
9	Unified Team; Andrey Dundukov; Sergey Shvagirev; Valery Stolyarov	545.3; 193.1; 167.4; 184.8	+8:19
10	Estonia; Ago Markvardt; Peter Heli; Allar Levandi	525.9; 161.0; 183.4; 181.5	+9:56
11	Switzerland; Hippolyt Kempf; Andreas Schaad; Marco Zarucchi	521.9; 175.9; 161.2; 184.8	+10:16

=== Cross-country ===
Each member of the team completed a ten kilometre cross-country skiing leg.

Rank	Team	Start time	Cross-country		Finish time
Rank	Team	Start time	Time	Place	Finish time
1st place, gold medalist(s)	Japan; Reiichi Mikata; Takanori Kono; Kenji Ogiwara	+0:00	1:23:36.5; 28:22.5; 28:40.2; 26:33.8	6	1:23:36.5
2nd place, silver medalist(s)	Norway; Knut Tore Apeland; Fred Børre Lundberg; Trond Einar Elden	+6:16	1:18:46.9; 26:22.8; 26:19.7; 26:04.4	1	1:25:02.9
3rd place, bronze medalist(s)	Austria; Klaus Ofner; Stefan Kreiner; Klaus Sulzenbacher	+2:27	1:22:49.6; 27:56.6; 28:34.2; 26:18.8	3	1:25:16.6
4	France; Francis Reppelin; Sylvain Guillaume; Fabrice Guy	+5:33	1:20:19.0; 27:27.0; 26:28.8; 26:23.2	2	1:25:52.0
5	Germany; Hans-Peter Pohl; Jens Deimel; Thomas Dufter	+2:57	1:25:24.9; 28:01.2; 29:53.5; 27:30.2	8	1:28:21.9
6	Czechoslovakia; Josef Kovařík; Milan Kučera; František Máka	+8:12	1:24:29.2; 27:47.8; 29:37.8; 27:03.6	7	1:32:41.2
7	Finland; Pasi Saapunki; Jari Mantila; Teemu Summanen	+6:59	1:25:44.3; 27:15.5; 30:23.1; 28:05.7	9	1:32:43.3
8	United States; Joe Holland; Tim Tetreault; Ryan Heckman	+4:29	1:28:15.8; 29:44.9; 28:48.6; 29:42.3	10	1:32:44.8
9	Estonia; Ago Markvardt; Peter Heli; Allar Levandi	+9:56	1:23:20.9; 28:17.8; 28:06.9; 26:56.2	4	1:33:16.9
10	Switzerland; Hippolyt Kempf; Andreas Schaad; Marco Zarucchi	+10:16	1:23:22.4; 27:24.2; 27:43.4; 28:14.8	5	1:33:38.4
11	Unified Team; Andrey Dundukov; Sergey Shvagirev; Valery Stolyarov	+8:19	1:29:38.2; 28:35.2; 30:39.6; 30:23.4	11	1:37:57.2
