= 1992–93 FIS Nordic Combined World Cup =

International skiing competition

Nordic Combined World Cup 1992/93
Winners
- Overall: (Japan) Kenji Ogiwara
- Nations Cup: Japan

Competitions
- Venues: 8
- Individual: 8

The 1992/93 FIS Nordic Combined World Cup was the 10th world cup season, a combination of ski jumping and cross-country skiing organized by FIS. It started on 5 Dec 1992 in Vuokatti, Finland and ended on 20 March 1993 in Štrbské Pleso, Slovakia.

== Calendar ==
=== Men ===
Num	Season	Date	Place	Hill	Discipline	Winner	Second	Third
72	1	5 December 1992	(Finland) Vuokatti	Hyppyrimäki	K90 / 15 km	(Japan) Kenji Ogiwara	(Japan) Takanori Kōno	(Norway) Bjarte Engen Vik
73	2	12 December 1992	(France) Courchevel	Tremplin du Praz	K120 / 15 km	(Japan) Kenji Ogiwara	(Estonia) Allar Levandi	(Japan) Takanori Kōno
74	3	19 December 1992	(Switzerland) St. Moritz	Olympiaschanze	K94 / 15 km	(Japan) Kenji Ogiwara	(Japan) Takanori Kōno	(Japan) Masashi Abe
75	4	8 January 1993	(Germany) Schonach	Langenwaldschanze	K90 / 15 km	(Norway) Fred Børre Lundberg	(Japan) Masashi Abe	(Japan) Kenji Ogiwara
76	5	23 January 1993	(Austria) Saalfelden	Felix-Gottwald-Schisprungstadion	K85 / 15 km	(Japan) Kenji Ogiwara	(Germany) Thomas Dufter	(Germany) Jens Deimel
FIS Nordic World Ski Championships 1993
77	6	5 March 1993	(Finland) Lahti	Salpausselkä	K90 / 15 km	(Japan) Kenji Ogiwara	(Norway) Fred Børre Lundberg	(Japan) Masashi Abe
78	7	12 March 1993	(Norway) Oslo	Holmenkollbakken	K110 / 15 km	(Japan) Takanori Kōno	(Japan) Kenji Ogiwara	(Japan) Jun’ichi Kogawa
79	8	20 March 1993	(Slovakia) Štrbské Pleso	MS 1970 B	K90 / 15 km	(Japan) Kenji Ogiwara	(Japan) Takanori Kōno	(Norway) Fred Børre Lundberg

== Standings ==
=== Overall ===
Rank		Points
1	(Japan) Kenji Ogiwara	185
2	(Norway) Fred Børre Lundberg	115
3	(Japan) Takanori Kōno	112
4	(Japan) Masashi Abe	94
5	(Estonia) Allar Levandi	62
6	(Norway) Knut Tore Apeland	48
7	(Norway) Trond Einar Elden	44
8	(Switzerland) Jean-Yves Cuendet	41
9	(Switzerland) Andreas Schaad	40
10	(France) Fabrice Guy	39

- Standings after 8 events.

=== Nations Cup ===
Rank		Points
1	Japan	529
2	Norway	362
3	Switzerland	153
4	Germany	121
5	France	111
6	Russia	76
7	Austria	52
8	Italy	50
9	Czech Republic	26
10	Finland	25

- Standings after 8 events.
