= 1994–95 FIS Nordic Combined World Cup =

International skiing competition

Nordic Combined World Cup 1994/95
Winners
- Overall: (Japan) Kenji Ogiwara
- Nations Cup: Norway

Competitions
- Venues: 10
- Individual: 10

The 1994/95 FIS Nordic Combined World Cup was the 12th world cup season, a combination of ski jumping and cross-country skiing organized by FIS. It started on 29 Nov 1994 in Steamboat Springs, United States and ended on 25 March 1995 in Sapporo, Japan.

== Calendar ==
=== Men ===
Num	Season	Date	Place	Hill	Discipline	Winner	Second	Third
89	1	29 November 1994	(United States) Steamboat Springs	Howelsen Hill	K114 / 15 km	(Norway) Knut Tore Apeland	(Norway) Bjarte Engen Vik	(Norway) Fred Børre Lundberg
90	2	10 December 1994	(Slovakia) Štrbské Pleso	MS 1970 B	K88 / 15 km	(Norway) Fred Børre Lundberg	(Japan) Kenji Ogiwara	(Norway) Bjarte Engen Vik
91	3	7 January 1995	(Germany) Schonach	Langenwaldschanze	K90 / 15 km	(Norway) Fred Børre Lundberg	(Japan) Kenji Ogiwara	(Norway) Bjarte Engen Vik
92	4	10 January 1995	(Italy) Val di Fiemme	Trampolino dal Ben	K120 / 15 km	(Japan) Kenji Ogiwara	(Norway) Fred Børre Lundberg	(Norway) Knut Tore Apeland
93	5	14 January 1995	(Czech Republic) Liberec	Ještěd A	K120 / 15 km	(Japan) Kenji Ogiwara	(Japan) Tsugiharu Ogiwara	(Norway) Bjarte Engen Vik
94	6	28 January 1995	(Finland) Vuokatti	Hyppyrimäki	K90 / 15 km	(Norway) Knut Tore Apeland	(Norway) Halldor Skard	(Japan) Kenji Ogiwara
95	7	3 February 1995	(Sweden) Falun	Lugnet	K115 / 15 km	(Japan) Kenji Ogiwara	(Japan) Takanori Kōno	(Austria) Mario Stecher
96	8	9 February 1995	(Norway) Oslo	Holmenkollbakken	K110 / 15 km	(Japan) Kenji Ogiwara	(Japan) Tsugiharu Ogiwara	(Norway) Bjarte Engen Vik
97	9	18 February 1995	(Austria) Bad Goisern	Kalmberg-Schanzen	K90 / 15 km	(Japan) Kenji Ogiwara	(Norway) Knut Tore Apeland	(Norway) Trond Einar Elden
FIS Nordic World Ski Championships 1995
98	10	25 March 1995	(Japan) Sapporo	Ōkurayama	K115 / 15 km	(Japan) Kenji Ogiwara	(Norway) Knut Tore Apeland	(Norway) Bjarte Engen Vik

== Standings ==
=== Overall ===
Rank		Points
1	(Japan) Kenji Ogiwara	1285
2	(Norway) Bjarte Engen Vik	911
3	(Norway) Knut Tore Apeland	898
4	(Japan) Tsugiharu Ogiwara	825
5	(Japan) Takanori Kōno	710
6	(Norway) Fred Børre Lundberg	691
7	(Norway) Trond Einar Elden	642
8	(Norway) Halldor Skard	590
9	(Austria) Mario Stecher	550
10	(Japan) Masashi Abe	516

- Standings after 10 events.

=== Nations Cup ===
Rank		Points
1	Norway	4859
2	Japan	3754
3	Austria	1496
4	Germany	1198
5	United States	1074
6	Czech Republic	680
7	Switzerland	542
8	France	536
9	Finland	494
10	Italy	342

- Standings after 10 events.
