= FIS Nordic Combined World Cup =

Cross-country skiing and ski jumping competition

- Genre: Nordic combined
- Locations: Europe, Japan, Canada (rarely), United States (rarely)
- Inaugurated: 17 Dec 1983; 42 years ago (Men); 16 Mar 2000; 26 years ago (Team); 18 Dec 2020; 5 years ago (Women)
- Organiser: International Ski Federation
- People: Lasse Ottesen (race director)
- 2025–26 FIS Nordic Combined World Cup

The FIS Nordic Combined World Cup is a Nordic combined competition organized by the International Ski Federation (FIS), representing the highest level of international competition for men and women in the sport. It was first introduced in the 1983–84 season, while the team event made its debut in the 1999–00 season.

The current FIS race director is Lasse Ottesen, a former Norwegian ski jumper and world record holder.

== History ==
The World Cup was introduced at the 34th FIS Congress (8–15 May 1983, in Sydney) and has been determining the overall World Cup winner since the 1983/84 season. Additionally, from the 2000–01 season to 2007–08 season, a Sprint World Cup was held.

During the FIS autumn meeting in October 2014 in Zurich, participants decided to give greater importance to women's competitions. As a result, a dedicated Women's World Cup series has been held since the 2020–21 season.

== Standings ==
The table below shows the three highest ranked skiers for each world cup season.

=== Men ===
==== Overall ====
Season	Winner	Runner-up	Third
1983–84	(Norway) Tom Sandberg	(East Germany) Uwe Dotzauer	(Norway) Geir Andersen
1984–85	(Norway) Geir Andersen	(West Germany) Hermann Weinbuch	(West Germany) Hubert Schwarz
1985–86	(West Germany) Hermann Weinbuch	(West Germany) Thomas Müller	(Norway) Geir Andersen (2)
1986–87	(Norway) Torbjørn Løkken	(West Germany) Hermann Weinbuch (2)	(Switzerland) Hippolyt Kempf
1987–88	(Austria) Klaus Sulzenbacher	(Norway) Torbjørn Løkken	(Switzerland) Andreas Schaad
1988–89	(Norway) Trond-Arne Bredesen	(Austria) Klaus Sulzenbacher	(Switzerland) Hippolyt Kempf (2)
1989–90	(Austria) Klaus Sulzenbacher (2)	(Soviet Union) Allar Levandi	(Norway) Knut Tore Apeland
1990–91	(Norway) Fred Børre Lundberg	(Austria) Klaus Sulzenbacher	(Norway) Trond-Einar Elden
1991–92	(France) Fabrice Guy	(Austria) Klaus Sulzenbacher (3)	(Norway) Fred Børre Lundberg
1992–93	(Japan) Kenji Ogiwara	(Norway) Fred Børre Lundberg	(Japan) Takanori Kono
1993–94	(Japan) Kenji Ogiwara	(Japan) Takanori Kono	(Norway) Fred Børre Lundberg (2)
1994–95	(Japan) Kenji Ogiwara (3)	(Norway) Bjarte Engen Vik	(Norway) Knut Tore Apeland (2)
1995–96	(Norway) Knut Tore Apeland	(Japan) Kenji Ogiwara	(Finland) Jari Mantila
1996–97	(Finland) Samppa Lajunen	(Finland) Jari Mantila	(Norway) Bjarte Engen Vik
1997–98	(Norway) Bjarte Engen Vik	(Austria) Mario Stecher	(Austria) Felix Gottwald
1998–99	(Norway) Bjarte Engen Vik (2)	(Finland) Hannu Manninen	(Czech Republic) Ladislav Rygl
1999–00	(Finland) Samppa Lajunen (2)	(Norway) Bjarte Engen Vik (2)	(Czech Republic) Ladislav Rygl (2)
2000–01	(Austria) Felix Gottwald	(Germany) Ronny Ackermann	(Norway) Bjarte Engen Vik (2)
2001–02	(Germany) Ronny Ackermann	(Austria) Felix Gottwald	(Finland) Samppa Lajunen
2002–03	(Germany) Ronny Ackermann	(Austria) Felix Gottwald	(Germany) Björn Kircheisen
2003–04	(Finland) Hannu Manninen	(Germany) Ronny Ackermann	(Finland) Samppa Lajunen (2)
2004–05	(Finland) Hannu Manninen	(Germany) Ronny Ackermann (3)	(Austria) Felix Gottwald
2005–06	(Finland) Hannu Manninen	(Norway) Magnus Moan	(Germany) Björn Kircheisen (2)
2006–07	(Finland) Hannu Manninen (4)	(France) Jason Lamy-Chappuis	(Norway) Magnus Moan
2007–08	(Germany) Ronny Ackermann (3)	(Norway) Petter Tande	(United States) Bill Demong
2008–09	(Finland) Anssi Koivuranta	(Norway) Magnus Moan (2)	(United States) Bill Demong (2)
2009–10	(France) Jason Lamy-Chappuis	(Austria) Felix Gottwald (3)	(Norway) Magnus Moan (2)
2010–11	(France) Jason Lamy-Chappuis	(Norway) Mikko Kokslien	(Austria) Felix Gottwald (3)
2011–12	(France) Jason Lamy-Chappuis (3)	(Japan) Akito Watabe	(Norway) Mikko Kokslien
2012–13	(Germany) Eric Frenzel	(France) Jason Lamy-Chappuis (2)	(Japan) Akito Watabe
2013–14	(Germany) Eric Frenzel	(Germany) Johannes Rydzek	(Japan) Akito Watabe
2014–15	(Germany) Eric Frenzel	(Japan) Akito Watabe	(Germany) Johannes Rydzek
2015–16	(Germany) Eric Frenzel	(Japan) Akito Watabe	(Germany) Fabian Rießle
2016–17	(Germany) Eric Frenzel (5)	(Germany) Johannes Rydzek (2)	(Japan) Akito Watabe
2017–18	(Japan) Akito Watabe	(Norway) Jan Schmid	(Germany) Fabian Rießle (2)
2018–19	(Norway) Jarl Magnus Riiber	(Japan) Akito Watabe (4)	(Austria) Franz-Josef Rehrl
2019–20	(Norway) Jarl Magnus Riiber	(Norway) Jørgen Graabak	(Germany) Vinzenz Geiger
2020–21	(Norway) Jarl Magnus Riiber	(Germany) Vinzenz Geiger	(Japan) Akito Watabe (4)
2021–22	(Norway) Jarl Magnus Riiber	(Austria) Johannes Lamparter	(Germany) Vinzenz Geiger (2)
2022–23	(Austria) Johannes Lamparter	(Norway) Jens Lurås Oftebro	(Germany) Julian Schmid
2023–24	(Norway) Jarl Magnus Riiber (5)	(Austria) Stefan Rettenegger	(Austria) Johannes Lamparter
2024–25	(Germany) Vinzenz Geiger	(Norway) Jarl Magnus Riiber	(Austria) Johannes Lamparter (2)
2025–26	(Austria) Johannes Lamparter (2)	(Norway) Jens Lurås Oftebro (2)	(Norway) Einar Lurås Oftebro

Rank	Nation	Wins	Second	Third	Total
1	Norway	13	13	13	39
2	Germany	10	9	9	28
3	Finland	7	2	3	12
4	Austria	5	9	6	20
5	Japan	4	6	5	15
6	France	4	2	-	6
7	Soviet Union; East Germany	-	1	-	1
9	Switzerland	-	-	3	3
10	Czech Republic; United States	-	-	2	2

==== Best Jumper Trophy ====
Season	Winner	Runner-up	Third
2018–19	(Austria) Franz-Josef Rehrl	(Norway) Jarl Magnus Riiber	(Austria) Mario Seidl
2019–20	(Norway) Jarl Magnus Riiber	(Norway) Jens Lurås Oftebro	(Norway) Espen Bjørnstad
2020–21	(Norway) Jarl Magnus Riiber	(Japan) Ryōta Yamamoto	(Japan) Akito Watabe
2021–22	(Norway) Jarl Magnus Riiber	(Estonia) Kristjan Ilves	(Austria) Johannes Lamparter
2022–23	(Japan) Ryōta Yamamoto	(Austria) Franz-Josef Rehrl	(Norway) Jarl Magnus Riiber
2023–24	(Norway) Jarl Magnus Riiber	(Austria) Johannes Lamparter	(Austria) Thomas Rettenegger
2024–25	(Norway) Jarl Magnus Riiber (5)	(Austria) Franz-Josef Rehrl (2)	(Austria) Johannes Lamparter (2)
2025–26	(Austria) Thomas Rettenegger	(Austria) Johannes Lamparter (2)	(Finland) Ilkka Herola

Rank	Nation	Wins	Second	Third	Total
1	Norway	5	2	2	9
2	Austria	2	4	4	10
3	Japan	1	1	1	3
4	Estonia	-	1	–	1
5	Finland	-	–	1	1

==== Best Skier Trophy ====
Season	Winner	Runner-up	Third
2018–19	(Italy) Alessandro Pittin	(Norway) Magnus Krog	(Finland) Ilkka Herola
2019–20	(Finland) Ilkka Herola	(Italy) Alessandro Pittin	(Germany) Eric Frenzel
2020–21	(Finland) Ilkka Herola	(Norway) Jørgen Graabak	(Germany) Vinzenz Geiger
2021–22	(Finland) Ilkka Herola (3)	(Norway) Jørgen Graabak	(Germany) Vinzenz Geiger (2)
2022–23	(Norway) Jens Lurås Oftebro	(Germany) Vinzenz Geiger	(Germany) Fabian Rießle
2023–24	(Germany) Vinzenz Geiger	(Norway) Jens Lurås Oftebro	(Finland) Eero Hirvonen
2024–25	(Norway) Jens Lurås Oftebro	(Germany) Vinzenz Geiger (2)	(Austria) Stefan Rettenegger
2025–26	(Norway) Jens Lurås Oftebro (3)	(Germany) Johannes Rydzek	(Norway) Aleksander Skoglund

Rank	Nation	Wins	Second	Third	Total
1	Finland	3	–	2	5
2	Norway	3	4	1	8
3	Germany	1	3	4	8
4	Italy	1	1	–	2
5	Austria	–	–	1	1

==== Sprint ====
Season	Winner	Runner-up	Third
2000–01	(Austria) Felix Gottwald	(Germany) Ronny Ackermann	(Norway) Kristian Hammer
2001–02	(Germany) Ronny Ackermann	(Finland) Samppa Lajunen	(Austria) Felix Gottwald
2002–03	(Germany) Ronny Ackermann	(Austria) Felix Gottwald	(Germany) Björn Kircheisen
2003–04	(Finland) Hannu Manninen	(Finland) Samppa Lajunen (2)	(Germany) Ronny Ackermann
2004–05	(Finland) Hannu Manninen	(Germany) Ronny Ackermann (2)	(United States) Todd Lodwick
2005–06	(Finland) Hannu Manninen (3)	(Norway) Magnus Moan	(Germany) Björn Kircheisen (2)
2006–07	(France) Jason Lamy-Chappuis	(Norway) Magnus Moan (2)	(Austria) Felix Gottwald (2)
2007–08	(Germany) Ronny Ackermann (3)	(France) Jason Lamy-Chappuis	(Austria) Bernhard Gruber

Rank	Nation	Wins	Second	Third	Total
1	Germany	3	2	3	8
2	Finland	3	2	-	5
3	Austria	1	1	3	5
4	France	1	1	-	2
5	Norway	-	2	1	3
6	United States	-	-	1	1

==== Compact ====
Season	Winner	Runner-up	Third
2023–24	(Norway) Jarl Magnus Riiber	(Austria) Stefan Rettenegger	(Germany) Johannes Rydzek
2024–25	(Germany) Vinzenz Geiger	(Norway) Jarl Magnus Riiber	(Austria) Johannes Lamparter
2025–26	(Austria) Johannes Lamparter	(Norway) Jens Lurås Oftebro	(Finland) Ilkka Herola

Rank	Nation	Wins	Second	Third	Total
1	Norway	1	2	-	3
2	Austria	1	1	1	3
3	Germany	1	-	1	2
4	Finland	-	-	1	1

==== Mass Start ====
Season	Winner	Runner-up	Third
2024–25	(Norway) Jarl Magnus Riiber	(Austria) Johannes Lamparter	(Germany) Vinzenz Geiger
2025–26	(Austria) Johannes Lamparter	(Austria) Thomas Rettenegger	(Austria) Stefan Rettenegger

Rank	Nation	Wins	Second	Third	Total
1	Austria	1	2	1	4
2	Norway	1	-	-	1
3	Germany	-	-	1	1

==== Nations Cup ====
Season	Winner	Runner-up	Third
1983–84	Norway	East Germany	Soviet Union
1984–85	Norway	West Germany	East Germany
1985–86	West Germany	Norway	Switzerland
1986–87	Norway	West Germany	Soviet Union
1987–88	Norway	Austria	Switzerland
1988–89	Norway	Austria	France
1989–90	Norway	Austria	Soviet Union (3)
1990–91	Norway	Austria	Switzerland
1991–92	Norway	Austria	France
1992–93	Japan	Norway	Switzerland
1993–94	Norway	Japan	Switzerland (5)
1994–95	Norway	Japan (2)	Austria
1995–96	Norway	Finland	Japan
1996–97	Norway	Finland	Austria
1997–98	Norway	Austria	Finland
1998–99	Norway	Finland	Japan (2)
1999–00	Finland	Norway	Germany
2000–01	Austria	Norway	Germany
2001–02	Germany	Finland	Austria
2002–03	Germany	Austria	Finland (2)
2003–04	Finland (2)	Germany	Austria
2004–05	Germany	Finland	Austria
2005–06	Germany	Finland	Austria
2006–07	Austria	Finland (7)	Germany
2007–08	Germany	Austria	Norway
2008–09	Germany	Norway	Austria
2009–10	Austria	Germany	Norway
2010–11	Austria	Norway	Germany
2011–12	Norway	Germany	France (3)
2012–13	Germany	Norway	Austria
2013–14	Germany	Norway	Austria
2014–15	Germany	Norway	Austria
2015–16	Germany	Norway	Austria
2016–17	Germany	Austria	Norway
2017–18	Norway	Germany	Austria
2018–19	Norway	Germany	Austria
2019–20	Norway	Germany	Austria
2020–21	Germany	Norway	Austria
2021–22	Norway (19)	Germany	Austria
2022–23	Germany	Norway	Austria (17)
2023–24	Austria	Norway (13)	Germany (5)
2024–25	Germany (15)	Austria (10)	Norway
2025–26	Austria (6)	Germany (10)	Norway (5)

Rank	Nation	Wins	Second	Third	Total
1	Norway	19	13	5	37
2	Germany	15	10	5	30
3	Austria	6	10	17	33
4	Finland	2	7	2	11
5	Japan	1	2	2	5
6	East Germany	-	1	1	2
7	Switzerland	-	-	5	5
8	France; Soviet Union	-	-	3	3

=== Women ===
==== Overall ====
Season	Winner	Runner-up	Third
2020–21	(United States) Tara Geraghty-Moats	(Norway) Gyda Westvold Hansen	(Japan) Anju Nakamura
2021–22	(Norway) Gyda Westvold Hansen	(Norway) Ida Marie Hagen	(Slovenia) Ema Volavšek
2022–23	(Norway) Gyda Westvold Hansen (2)	(Germany) Nathalie Armbruster	(Norway) Ida Marie Hagen
2023–24	(Norway) Ida Marie Hagen	(Norway) Gyda Westvold Hansen (2)	(Norway) Mari Leinan Lund
2024–25	(Germany) Nathalie Armbruster	(Norway) Ida Marie Hagen (2)	(Japan) Haruka Kasai
2025–26	(Norway) Ida Marie Hagen (2)	(United States) Alexa Brabec	(Finland) Minja Korhonen

Rank	Nation	Wins	Second	Third	Total
1	Norway	4	4	2	10
2	Germany	1	1	0	2
3	United States	1	1	0	2
4	Japan	0	0	2	2
5	Slovenia	0	0	1	1
5	Finland	0	0	1	1

==== Best Jumper Trophy ====
Season	Winner	Runner-up	Third
2020–21	(Norway) Gyda Westvold Hansen	(Italy) Veronica Gianmoena	(Japan) Anju Nakamura
2021–22	(Norway) Gyda Westvold Hansen	(Italy) Annika Sieff	(Slovenia) Ema Volavšek
2022–23	(Norway) Gyda Westvold Hansen	(Italy) Annika Sieff (2)	(Germany) Nathalie Armbruster
2023–24	(Norway) Gyda Westvold Hansen (4)	(Norway) Mari Leinan Lund	(Norway) Ida Marie Hagen
2024–25	(Germany) Maria Gerboth	(Japan) Haruka Kasai	(Japan) Yuna Kasai
2025–26	(Norway) Ingrid Låte	(United States) Alexa Brabec	(Norway) Ida Marie Hagen (2)

Rank	Nation	Wins	Second	Third	Total
1	Norway	5	1	2	8
2	Germany	1	–	1	2
3	Italy	–	3	–	3
4	Japan	–	1	2	2
5	United States	–	1	–	1
6	Slovenia	–	–	1	1

==== Best Skier Trophy ====
Season	Winner	Runner-up	Third
2020–21	(United States) Tara Geraghty-Moats	(Japan) Anju Nakamura	(Norway) Gyda Westvold Hansen
2021–22	(Japan) Anju Nakamura	(Norway) Ida Marie Hagen	(Norway) Gyda Westvold Hansen
2022–23	(Norway) Ida Marie Hagen	(Norway) Marte Leinan Lund	(Norway) Gyda Westvold Hansen
2023–24	(Norway) Ida Marie Hagen	(Germany) Nathalie Armbruster	(Norway) Gyda Westvold Hansen (4)
2024–25	(Norway) Ida Marie Hagen	(Germany) Nathalie Armbruster (2)	(Norway) Marte Leinan Lund
2025–26	(Norway) Ida Marie Hagen (4)	(Norway) Marte Leinan Lund (2)	(United States) Tara Geraghty-Moats

Rank	Nation	Wins	Second	Third	Total
1	Norway	4	3	5	12
2	Japan	1	1	–	2
3	United States	1	–	1	2
4	Germany	–	2	–	2

==== Compact ====
Season	Winner	Runner-up	Third
2023–24	(Norway) Ida Marie Hagen	(Norway) Gyda Westvold Hansen	(Germany) Nathalie Armbruster
2024–25	(Germany) Nathalie Armbruster	(Norway) Ida Marie Hagen	(Norway) Gyda Westvold Hansen
2025–26	(Norway) Ida Marie Hagen (2)	(United States) Alexa Brabec	(Finland) Minja Korhonen

Rank	Nation	Wins	Second	Third	Total
1	Norway	2	2	1	5
2	Germany	1	-	1	2
3	United States	-	1	-	1
4	Finland	-	-	1	1

==== Mass Start ====
Season	Winner	Runner-up	Third
2024–25	(Japan) Haruka Kasai	(Norway) Ida Marie Hagen	(Japan) Yuna Kasai
2025–26	(Norway) Ida Marie Hagen	(United States) Alexa Brabec	(Germany) Nathalie Armbruster

Rank	Nation	Wins	Second	Third	Total
1	Norway	1	1	-	2
2	Japan	1	-	1	2
3	United States	-	1	-	1
4	Germany	-	-	1	1

==== Nations Cup ====
Season	Winner	Runner-up	Third
2020–21	Norway	United States	Austria
2021–22	Norway	Japan	Germany
2022–23	Norway	Germany	Japan
2023–24	Norway	Germany	Japan
2024–25	Germany	Norway	Japan (3)
2025–26	Norway (5)	Germany (3)	(United States) USA

Rank	Nation	Wins	Second	Third	Total
1	Norway	5	1	0	6
2	Germany	1	3	1	5
2	Japan	0	1	3	4
4	United States	0	1	1	2
5	Austria	0	0	1	1

== Men's general statistics ==
Individual events in the World Cup history

Total	GUN–L	GUN–N	MSS	COM	COM-F	GU	Sp	Pen	Hsp	Csp	Winners
649	157	112	34	13	1	239	86	4	2	1	79

after Gundersen in Oslo (15 March 2026)

=== Wins ===
Rank		Wins
1	(Norway) Jarl Magnus Riiber	78
2	(Finland) Hannu Manninen	48
3	(Germany) Eric Frenzel	43
4	(Germany) Ronny Ackermann	28
5	(Norway) Bjarte Engen Vik	26
5	(France) Jason Lamy-Chappuis	26
7	(Norway) Magnus Hovdal Moan	25
8	(Austria) Felix Gottwald	23
8	(Austria) Johannes Lamparter	23
10	(Finland) Samppa Lajunen	20

=== Podiums ===
Rank		Podiums
1	(Norway) Jarl Magnus Riiber	111
2	(Finland) Hannu Manninen	90
3	(Germany) Eric Frenzel	84
4	(Germany) Ronny Ackermann	77
5	(Japan) Akito Watabe	74
6	(Austria) Felix Gottwald	68
7	(Norway) Bjarte Engen Vik	61
7	(Austria) Johannes Lamparter	61
9	(France) Jason Lamy-Chappuis	59
10	(Finland) Samppa Lajunen	55
10	(Germany) Vinzenz Geiger	55

=== Individual starts ===
Rank		Starts
1	(Japan) Akito Watabe	303
2	(Germany) Johannes Rydzek	301
3	(Austria) Wilhelm Denifl	295
4	(Germany) Björn Kircheisen	281
5	(Germany) Eric Frenzel	270
6	(Norway) Jan Schmid	269
7	(Austria) Mario Stecher	267
8	(Japan) Yoshito Watabe	252
9	(Austria) Christoph Bieler	247
9	(Austria) Lukas Klapfer	247

== Women's general statistics ==
Individual events in the World Cup history

Total	GUN–N	GUN–L	MSS	COM	Winners
62	37	3	10	12	10

after Gundersen in Oslo (15 March 2026)

=== Wins ===
Rank		Wins
1	(Norway) Ida Marie Hagen	28
2	(Norway) Gyda Westvold Hansen	23
3	(Germany) Nathalie Armbruster	3
4	(Norway) Mari Leinan Lund	2
5	(United States) Tara Geraghty-Moats	1
5	(Japan) Anju Nakamura	1
5	(Japan) Yuna Kasai	1
5	(Austria) Katharina Gruber	1
5	(United States) Alexa Brabec	1
5	(Finland) Minja Korhonen	1

=== Podiums ===
Rank		Podiums
1	(Norway) Ida Marie Hagen	46
2	(Norway) Gyda Westvold Hansen	40
3	(Germany) Nathalie Armbruster	25
4	(Norway) Mari Leinan Lund	12
5	(Japan) Haruka Kasai	11
6	(Finland) Minja Korhonen	10
7	(Austria) Lisa Hirner	9
8	(United States) Alexa Brabec	8
9	(Italy) Annika Sieff	5
9	(Japan) Yuna Kasai	5

=== Individual starts ===
Rank		Starts
1	(France) Lena Brocard	62
2	(United States) Annika Malacinski	61
3	(Germany) Jenny Nowak	60
3	(Japan) Yuna Kasai	60
3	(Norway) Ida Marie Hagen	60
6	(Austria) Annalena Slamik	56
7	(Norway) Marte Leinan Lund	55
7	(Germany) Nathalie Armbruster	55
9	(Italy) Veronica Gianmoena	52
10	(Italy) Daniela Dejori	49

== See also ==
- FIS Nordic World Ski Championships
- FIS Nordic Combined Grand Prix
