= 1988–89 FIS Nordic Combined World Cup =

International skiing competition

Nordic Combined World Cup 1988/89
Winners
- Overall: (Norway) Trond-Arne Bredesen
- Nations Cup: Norway

Competitions
- Venues: 9
- Individual: 9

The 1988/89 FIS Nordic Combined World Cup was the sixth World Cup season, a combination of ski jumping and cross-country skiing organized by International Ski Federation. It started on 17 Dec 1988 in Saalfelden, Austria and ended on 25 March 1989 in Thunder Bay, Canada.

== Calendar ==
=== Men ===
Num	Season	Date	Place	Hill	Discipline	Winner	Second	Third
38	1	17 December 1988	(Austria) Saalfelden	Felix-Gottwald-Schisprungstadion	K85 / 15 km	(Norway) Trond-Arne Bredesen	(Norway) Bård Jørgen Elden	(Norway) Geir Andersen
39	2	29 December 1988	(East Germany) Oberwiesenthal	Fichtelbergschanzen	K90 / 15 km	(Norway) Knut Tore Apeland	(Austria) Klaus Ofner	(Czechoslovakia) František Repka
40	3	7 January 1989	(West Germany) Schonach	Langenwaldschanze	K90 / 15 km	(Switzerland) Hippolyt Kempf	(Soviet Union) Andrey Dundukov	(Norway) Trond Einar Elden
41	4	14 January 1989	(West Germany) Reit im Winkl	Franz-Haslberger-Schanze	K90 / 15 km	(Norway) Trond-Arne Bredesen	(Switzerland) Hippolyt Kempf	(Austria) Klaus Sulzenbacher
42	5	21 January 1989	(Austria) Breitenwang	Raimund-Ertl-Schanze	K75 / 15 km	(Norway) Bård Jørgen Elden	(Poland) Stanisław Ustupski	(Austria) Klaus Sulzenbacher
FIS Nordic World Ski Championships 1989
43	6	3 March 1989	(Norway) Oslo	Holmenkollbakken	K105 / 15 km	(Norway) Trond Einar Elden	(Norway) Trond-Arne Bredesen	(Norway) Knut Tore Apeland
44	7	11 March 1989	(Sweden) Falun	Lugnet	K89 / 15 km	(Norway) Trond Einar Elden	(East Germany) Thomas Abratis	(Soviet Union) Allar Levandi
45	8	18 March 1989	(United States) Lake Placid	MacKenzie Intervale	K86 / 15 km	(Norway) Trond-Arne Bredesen	(Austria) Klaus Sulzenbacher	(France) Fabrice Guy
46	9	25 March 1989	(Canada) Thunder Bay	Big Thunder	K89 / 15 km	(Switzerland) Hippolyt Kempf	(France) Xavier Girard	(Norway) Trond-Arne Bredesen

== Standings ==
=== Overall ===
Rank		Points
1	(Norway) Trond-Arne Bredesen	119
2	(Austria) Klaus Sulzenbacher	109
3	(Switzerland) Hippolyt Kempf	94
4	(Norway) Bård Jørgen Elden	89
5	(Norway) Knut Tore Apeland	83
6	(Norway) Trond Einar Elden	77
7	(Soviet Union) Allar Levandi	52
8	(Soviet Union) Andrey Dundukov	48
9	(France) Fabrice Guy	47
10	(East Germany) Thomas Abratis	46

- Standings after 9 events.

=== Nations Cup ===
Rank		Points
1	Norway	499
2	Austria	178
3	France	162
4	Switzerland	145
5	Soviet Union	111
6	Czechoslovakia	99
6	East Germany	98
8	West Germany	67
9	Poland	31
10	Finland	29

- Standings after 9 events.
