= 1993–94 FIS Nordic Combined World Cup =

International skiing competition

Nordic Combined World Cup 1993/94
Winners
- Overall: (Japan) Kenji Ogiwara
- Nations Cup: Norway

Competitions
- Venues: 8
- Individual: 9

The 1993/94 FIS Nordic Combined World Cup was the 11th World Cup season, a combination of ski jumping and cross-country skiing organized by FIS. It started on 4 Dec 1993 in Saalfelden, Austria and ended on 19 March 1994 in Thunder Bay, Canada.

== Calendar ==
=== Men ===
Num	Season	Date	Place	Hill	Discipline	Winner	Second	Third
80	1	4 December 1993	(Austria) Saalfelden	Felix-Gottwald-Schisprungstadion	K85 / 15 km	(Japan) Kenji Ogiwara	(Norway) Fred Børre Lundberg	(Norway) Knut Tore Apeland
81	2	11 December 1993	(Switzerland) St. Moritz	Olympiaschanze	K94 / 15 km	(Japan) Kenji Ogiwara	(Japan) Takanori Kōno	(Norway) Trond Einar Elden
82	3	15 December 1993	(Switzerland) St. Moritz	Olympiaschanze	K94 / 15 km	(Japan) Kenji Ogiwara	(Norway) Knut Tore Apeland	(Japan) Takanori Kōno
83	4	8 January 1994	(Germany) Schonach	Langenwaldschanze	K90 / 15 km	(Japan) Kenji Ogiwara	(Japan) Takanori Kōno	(Norway) Knut Tore Apeland
84	5	15 January 1994	(Norway) Oslo	Holmenkollbakken	K115 / 15 km	(Austria) Mario Stecher	(Norway) Fred Børre Lundberg	(Japan) Takanori Kōno
85	6	22 January 1994	(Norway) Trondheim	Granåsen	K90 / 15 km	(Japan) Kenji Ogiwara	(Japan) Takanori Kōno	(Norway) Bjarte Engen Vik
1994 Winter Olympics
86	7	4 March 1994	(Finland) Vuokatti	Hyppyrimäki	K90 / 15 km	(Norway) Fred Børre Lundberg	(Japan) Takanori Kōno	(Japan) Kenji Ogiwara
87	8	12 March 1994	(Japan) Sapporo	Miyanomori	K90 / 15 km	(Norway) Fred Børre Lundberg	(Japan) Kenji Ogiwara	(Switzerland) Jean-Yves Cuendet
88	9	19 March 1994	(Canada) Thunder Bay	Big Thunder	K90 / 15 km	(Switzerland) Hippolyt Kempf	(Japan) Kenji Ogiwara	(Norway) Trond Einar Elden

== Standings ==
=== Overall ===
Rank		Points
1	(Japan) Kenji Ogiwara	1135
2	(Japan) Takanori Kōno	901
3	(Norway) Fred Børre Lundberg	840
4	(Norway) Bjarte Engen Vik	815
5	(Norway) Knut Tore Apeland	720
6	(Norway) Trond Einar Elden	713
7	(Norway) Bård Jørgen Elden	472
8	(Switzerland) Hippolyt Kempf	451
9	(Finland) Jari Mantila	437
10	(Estonia) Allar Levandi	418

- Standings after 9 events.

=== Nations Cup ===
Rank		Points
1	Norway	3730
2	Japan	2810
3	Switzerland	1136
4	Germany	1048
5	Finland	934
6	Austria	873
7	Czech Republic	671
8	Russia	519
8	France	492
10	Italy	430

- Standings after 9 events.
