= 1989–90 FIS Nordic Combined World Cup =

International skiing competition

Nordic Combined World Cup 1989/90
Winners
- Overall: (Austria) Klaus Sulzenbacher
- Nations Cup: Norway

Competitions
- Venues: 9
- Individual: 9

The 1989/90 FIS Nordic Combined World Cup was the seventh World Cup season, a combination of ski jumping and cross-country skiing organized by International Ski Federation. It started on 16 Dec 1989 in St. Moritz, Switzerland and ended on 16 March 1990 in Oslo, Norway.

== Calendar ==
=== Men ===
Num	Season	Date	Place	Hill	Discipline	Winner	Second	Third
47	1	16 December 1989	(Switzerland) St. Moritz	Olympiaschanze	K94 / 15 km	(Switzerland) Hippolyt Kempf	(Soviet Union) Allar Levandi	(Norway) Trond Arne Bredesen
48	2	6 January 1990	(West Germany) Reit im Winkl	Franz-Haslberger-Schanze	K90 / 15 km	(Austria) Klaus Sulzenbacher	(Soviet Union) Allar Levandi	(Norway) Trond Einar Elden
49	3	14 January 1990	(Austria) Saalfelden	Felix-Gottwald-Schisprungstadion	K85 / 15 km	(Austria) Klaus Sulzenbacher	(France) Fabrice Guy	(Soviet Union) Allar Levandi
50	4	19 January 1990	(Austria) Murau	Gumpold-Schanzen	K85 / 15 km	(Austria) Klaus Sulzenbacher	(Norway) Fred Børre Lundberg	(France) Fabrice Guy
51	5	10 February 1990	(Soviet Union) Leninigrad	Tramplin Kavgolovo	K88 / 15 km	(Norway) Fred Børre Lundberg	(Norway) Knut Tore Apeland	(Soviet Union) Allar Levandi
52	6	17 February 1990	(Czechoslovakia) Štrbské Pleso	MS 1970 B	K88 / 15 km	(Austria) Klaus Sulzenbacher	(Soviet Union) Allar Levandi	(Norway) Knut Tore Apeland
53	7	2 March 1990	(Finland) Lahti	Salpausselkä	K88 / 15 km	(Norway) Knut Tore Apeland	(Soviet Union) Allar Levandi	(Austria) Klaus Sulzenbacher
54	8	9 March 1990	(Sweden) Örnsköldsvik	Paradiskullen	K82 / 15 km	(Austria) Klaus Sulzenbacher	(Norway) Fred Børre Lundberg	(Soviet Union) Allar Levandi
55	9	16 March 1990	(Norway) Oslo	Holmenkollbakken	K105 / 15 km	(Soviet Union) Andrey Dundukov	(East Germany) Thomas Abratis	(Norway) Trond Einar Elden

== Standings ==
=== Overall ===
Rank		Points
1	(Austria) Klaus Sulzenbacher	164
2	(Soviet Union) Allar Levandi	135
3	(Norway) Knut Tore Apeland	99
4	(Norway) Fred Børre Lundberg	94
5	(East Germany) Thomas Abratis	84
6	(France) Fabrice Guy	81
7	(Norway) Trond Einar Elden	78
8	(Soviet Union) Andrey Dundukov	53
9	(Austria) Günter Csar	49
10	(Soviet Union) Vasily Savin	44

- Standings after 9 events.

=== Nations Cup ===
Rank		Points
1	Norway	379
2	Austria	305
3	Soviet Union	149
4	East Germany	129
5	France	116
6	Switzerland	87
7	West Germany	80
8	Czechoslovakia	41
9	Finland	35
10	Japan	20

- Standings after 9 events.
