= 1996–97 FIS Nordic Combined World Cup =

International skiing competition

Nordic Combined World Cup 1996/97
Winners
- Overall: (Finland) Samppa Lajunen
- Nations Cup: Norway

Competitions
- Venues: 11
- Individual: 12

The 1996/97 FIS Nordic Combined World Cup was the 14th world cup season, a combination of ski jumping and cross-country skiing organized by FIS. It started on 22 Nov 1996 in Rovaniemi, Finland and ended on 22 March 1997 in Štrbské Pleso, Slovakia.

== Calendar ==
=== Men ===
Num	Season	Date	Place	Hill	Discipline	Winner	Second	Third
112	1	22 November 1996	(Finland) Rovaniemi	Ounasvaara	K90 / 15 km	(Finland) Jari Mantila	(Finland) Samppa Lajunen	(Austria) Mario Stecher
113	2	11 December 1996	(United States) Steamboat Springs	Howelsen Hill	K88 / 15 km	(Norway) Halldor Skard	(Norway) Bjarte Engen Vik	(Norway) Trond Einar Elden
114	3	29 December 1996	(Germany) Oberwiesenthal	Fichtelbergschanzen	K90 / 7.5 km (Sprint)	(Austria) Mario Stecher	(Norway) Bjarte Engen Vik	(United States) Todd Lodwick
115	4	5 January 1997	(Germany) Schonach	Langenwaldschanze	K90 / 15 km	(Finland) Samppa Lajunen	(Austria) Mario Stecher	(Finland) Jari Mantila
116	5	11 January 1997	(Austria) Saalfelden	Felix-Gottwald-Schisprungstadion	K85 / 15 km	(Finland) Hannu Manninen	(Austria) Mario Stecher	(Finland) Jari Mantila
117	6	14 January 1997	(Italy) Val di Fiemme	Trampolino dal Ben	K90 / 15 km	(Finland) Samppa Lajunen	(Italy) Andrea Longo	(Norway) Kristian Hammer
118	7	18 January 1997	(Switzerland) St. Moritz	Olympiaschanze	K95 / 15 km	(Austria) Mario Stecher	(Norway) Bjarte Engen Vik	(Finland) Samppa Lajunen
119	8	1 February 1997	(Japan) Hakuba	Olympic Hills	K120 / 15 km	(Austria) Mario Stecher	(Finland) Samppa Lajunen	(Czech Republic) Ladislav Rygl
FIS Nordic World Ski Championships 1997
120	9	8 March 1997	(Finland) Lahti	Salpausselkä	K114 / 15 km	(Finland) Hannu Manninen	(Norway) Halldor Skard	(United States) Tim Tetreault
121	10	14 March 1997	(Norway) Oslo	Holmenkollbakken	K-112 / 7.5 km (Sprint)	(Norway) Bjarte Engen Vik	(Finland) Hannu Manninen	(Norway) Trond Einar Elden
122	11	15 March 1997	(Norway) Oslo	Holmenkollbakken	K112 / 15 km	(Norway) Bjarte Engen Vik	(Finland) Samppa Lajunen	(Switzerland) Andreas Hartmann
123	12	22 March 1997	(Slovakia) Štrbské Pleso	MS 1970 A	K120 / 15 km	(Norway) Bjarte Engen Vik	(Japan) Kenji Ogiwara	(Finland) Jari Mantila

== Standings ==
=== Overall ===
Rank		Points
1	(Finland) Samppa Lajunen	1223
2	(Finland) Jari Mantila	940
3	(Norway) Bjarte Engen Vik	890
4	(Austria) Mario Stecher	884
5	(Finland) Hannu Manninen	875
6	(Japan) Kenji Ogiwara	750
7	(Norway) Halldor Skard	595
8	(Norway) Trond Einar Elden	581
9	(Russia) Valeri Stolyarov	507
10	(Norway) Knut Tore Apeland	497

- Standings after 12 events.

=== Nations Cup ===
Rank		Points
1	Norway	4459
2	Finland	4056
3	Austria	2221
4	France	1492
5	Japan	1165
6	United States	991
7	Czech Republic	949
8	Germany	767
9	Russia	600
10	Switzerland	586

- Standings after 12 events.
