= 1985–86 FIS Nordic Combined World Cup =

International skiing competition

Nordic Combined World Cup 1985/86
Winners
- Overall: (West Germany) Hermann Weinbuch
- Nations Cup: West Germany

Competitions
- Venues: 7
- Individual: 7

The 1985/86 FIS Nordic Combined World Cup was the third World Cup season, a combination of ski jumping and cross-country skiing organized by International Ski Federation. It started on 21 Dec 1985 in Tarvisio, Italy and ended on 22 March 1986 in Štrbské Pleso, Czechoslovakia.

== Calendar ==
=== Men ===
Num	Season	Date	Place	Hill	Discipline	Winner	Second	Third
15	1	21 December 1985	(Italy) Tarvisio	Trampolino Fratelli Nogara	K90 / 15 km	(Norway) Geir Andersen	(West Germany) Hermann Weinbuch	(West Germany) Thomas Müller
16	2	29 December 1985	(East Germany) Oberwiesenthal	Fichtelbergschanzen	K90 / 15 km	(West Germany) Thomas Müller	(East Germany) Uwe Dotzauer	(West Germany) Hermann Weinbuch
17	3	4 January 1986	(West Germany) Schonach	Langenwaldschanze	K90 / 15 km	(West Germany) Hermann Weinbuch	(West Germany) Thomas Müller	(Switzerland) Freddy Glanzmann
18	4	18 January 1986	(Austria) Murau	Gumpold-Schanze	K85 / 15 km	(West Germany) Hermann Weinbuch	(Norway) Hallstein Bøgseth	(West Germany) Thomas Müller
19	5	28 February 1986	(Finland) Lahti	Salpausselkä	K88 / 15 km	(West Germany) Hermann Weinbuch	(Norway) Geir Andersen	(Austria) Klaus Sulzenbacher
20	6	14 March 1986	(Norway) Oslo	Holmenkollbakken	K105 / 15 km	(Norway) Hallstein Bøgseth	(West Germany) Hermann Weinbuch	(Austria) Klaus Sulzenbacher
21	7	22 March 1986	(Czech Republic) Štrbské Pleso	MS 1970 B	K88 / 15 km	(West Germany) Hermann Weinbuch	(West Germany) Hubert Schwarz	(Norway) Geir Andersen

== Standings ==
=== Overall ===
Rank	after 7 events	Points
1	(West Germany) Hermann Weinbuch	120
2	(West Germany) Thomas Müller	86
3	(Norway) Geir Andersen	81
4	(Norway) Hallstein Bøgseth	73
5	(West Germany) Hubert Schwarz	48
6	(Switzerland) Fredy Glanzmann	44
7	(Austria) Klaus Sulzenbacher	43
8	(Italy) Gian-Paolo Mosele	41
9	(Norway) Espen Andersen	40
	(Switzerland) Andreas Schaad	40

=== Nations Cup ===
Rank	after 7 events	Points
1	West Germany	421
2	Norway	327
3	Switzerland	121
4	Austria	114
5	Finland	84
6	East Germany	75
7	Soviet Union	70
8	Italy	56
9	Czechoslovakia	40
10	Poland	39
