= Birkebeineren Ski Stadium =

Building in Lillehammer, Oppland, Norway

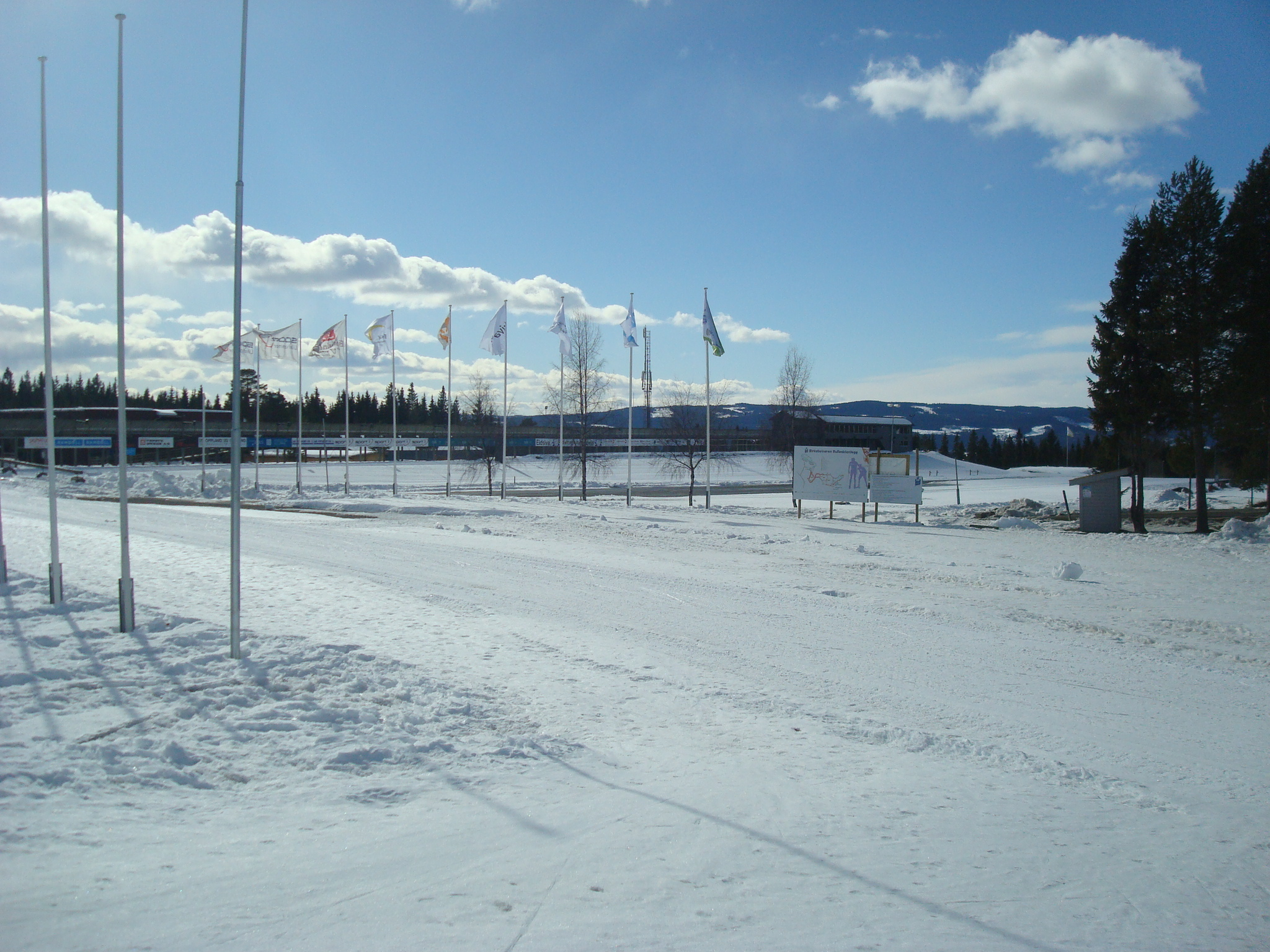
- Interactive map of Birkebeineren Ski Stadium
- Full name: Birkebeineren skistadion
- Location: Lillehammer, Norway
- Coordinates: 61°08′03″N 10°30′23″E
- Owner: Lillehammer Olympiapark
- Capacity: 31,000 (cross-country); 13,500 (biathlon)
- Record attendance: 100,000

Construction
- Groundbreaking: 1991; 35 years ago
- Opened: November 28, 1992; 33 years ago

Tenants
- 1994 Winter Olympics; 1994 Winter Paralympics; FIS Cross-Country World Cup (1993, 2000, 2002, 2013-); Biathlon World Cup (1993–97); FIS Nordic Combined World Cup (1998, 2000, 2003, 2005–06, 2009–10, 2013-); 2016 Winter Youth Olympics

Birkebeineren Ski Stadium (Norwegian: Birkebeineren skistadion) is a cross-country skiing and biathlon venue located in Lillehammer, Norway. Situated 3 kilometers (2 mi) from the town center and at 485 meters (1,591 ft) above mean sea level, it has two stadium areas, one for cross-country and one for biathlon. The former can accommodate 31,000 spectators, and the latter 13,500. The venue was built for the 1994 Winter Olympics, costing 83.6 million Norwegian krone (NOK). It was subsequently used by the 1994 Winter Paralympics for Paralympic Nordic skiing and Paralympic biathlon. After the games, ownership was transferred to the municipal Lillehammer Olympiapark. The venue has since been used for one Biathlon World Cup, three FIS Cross-Country World Cup and nine FIS Nordic Combined World Cup tournaments, the latter with the ski jumping competition taking place at the nearby Lysgårdsbakkene Ski Jumping Arena. Birkebeineren also hosted the 2016 Winter Youth Olympics.

== Construction ==
The location of the venue was decided in January 1990, following Lillehammer's successful bid to host the 1994 Winter Olympics. Construction was managed by the Lillehammer Olympic Organizing Committee (LOOC). Architects were 2Ø Arkitekter and the main consultant was Tonning & Lieng. Construction started in early 1991, before planning was completed, and lasted until 1993. The construction work was subcontracted to several companies. Landscaping was completed in 1994. The facilities used concrete and wood as the main materials. The stadium included 3,000-square-meter (32,000 sq ft) of temporary buildings, a 1,620-square-meter (17,400 sq ft) building converted to a riding center after the Olympics, and a 3,200-square-meter (34,000 sq ft) tent. The land around the venue is a swamp, and most of the surface soil had to be removed and replaced with harder earth. The soil was used as fertilizer or fill in other parts of the arena. A creek had to be bypassed with a 220 meters (720 ft) long pipe. The arena is also so flat that a drainage system had to be installed. After the Olympics, four temporary overpasses were removed. Construction of the tracks was done to minimize the impact on the forest.

The venue cost NOK 83.6 million, and was inaugurated on 28 November 1992 with an international biathlon competition. In December 1992, the LOOC stated that they wanted to upgrade the stadium spectator capacity, but that the transport systems would not allow more people. In 1993, the stadium had World Cup tournaments in biathlon and cross-country skiing as a trial before the Olympics. During several events, the computer system controlling the scoreboard and television scores collapsed. President Johan Baumann of the Norwegian Ski Federation criticized the venue and demanded that a new stadium be built. He stated that the stadium had been built to optimize television pictures, and that it had insufficient facilities for the spectators. In particular, he criticized the fact that the spectators were too far away from the skiers and the lack of a television screen and more scoreboards. In May, the LOOC announced that the stadium would be expanded for another 6,000 people before the Olympics. On 7 September, the ownership of the venue was transferred from the LOOC to Lillehammer Municipality via the subsidiary Lillehammer Olympiavekst, which later changed its name to Lillehammer Olympiapark. In October, the forest along the tracks were partially cleared to allow spectators without tickets to watch the events.

== Facilities ==
The arena covers an area of 200 hectares (490 acres), and is 3 kilometers (2 mi) from the town center. For the Olympics, 27 kilometers (17 mi) of cross-country tracks and 9 kilometers (5.6 mi) of biathlon tracks were built. There are two stadiums, one for cross-country skiing and one for biathlon. The former has a spectator capacity for 31,000, while the latter has a capacity for 13,500. In addition, up to 75,000 people watched the events the trackside during the Olympics. Permanent buildings include a 214-square-meter (2,300 sq ft) finishing house for biathlon, a 155-square-meter (1,670 sq ft) finishing house for cross-country, a 355-square-meter (3,820 sq ft) plant room. The cross-country stadium is 200 square meters (2,200 sq ft) long, while the biathlon stadium is 150 square meters (1,600 sq ft) long. The biathlon stadium has 30 shooting stations. The facility has a 1,250 kVA transformer, with an additional transformer used during the Olympics. Critical systems, such as computers and time-keeping equipment, have an uninterruptible power supply.

As a recreational venue, Birkebeineren connects to 450 kilometers (280 mi) of skiing tracks, including a 5 kilometers (3 mi) lighted track which is lit until 22:00 every day during winter, and is open to the public. During the summer, the tracks are available for jogging, running, roller skiing and similar activities. There is a café between the two stadiums, which also have dressing rooms and showers. The biathlon venue can be rented to hold private biathlon competition, with or without skis.

The dominant means of transport during the Olympics was by railway. Spectators heading to Birkebeineren were transported by train to Hovemoen Station on the Dovre Line, and would then be transported by shuttle bus to the stadium. In addition, spectators from certain areas were transported by bus directly to the stadium.

== Events ==
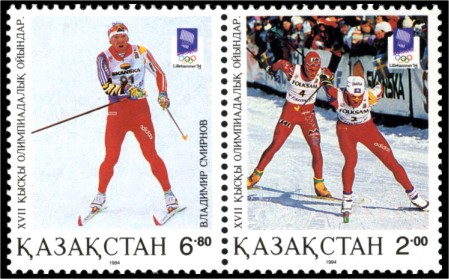
Kazakh stamp depicting Cross-country skiing at the 1994 Winter Olympics

During the 1994 Winter Olympics, the venue hosted ten cross-country skiing events, six biathlon events and two Nordic combined events. Over 203,000 people applied for the 31,000 seats for the relay. During the 1994 Winter Paralympics, the venue hosted the Paralympic Nordic skiing events and Paralympic biathlon.

The FIS Cross-Country World Cup has been hosted three times, in 1993, 2000 and 2002, all in February or March. The FIS Nordic Combined World Cup has been hosted seven times at the stadium, in 1998, 2000, 2003, 2005, 2006, 2009 and 2010. All tournaments have been held in December, and have seen the ski jumping competition hosted at Lysgårdsbakken, the Olympic ski jumping hill in Lillehammer. Birkebeineren hosted Biathlon World Cup events from 1993 to 1997. The stadium has also since 1992 been used as the goal area for Birkebeinerrennet, an annual ski marathon with thousands of participants. It has also hosted the Norwegian Nordic Ski Championships in 1993. Lillehammer hosted the 2016 Winter Youth Olympics; the cross-country, Nordic combined and biathlon events took place at Birkebeineren.

== Results ==
The following is a list of all Winter Olympics and World Cup events to be held at the stadium until December 2010. It includes date, sport (cross-country skiing, Nordic combined or biathlon), tournament, distance, and top three athletes (gold, silver and bronze).

| Date | Sport | Tournament | Distance | Gender | Gold | Silver | Bronze | Ref |
|---|---|---|---|---|---|---|---|---|
| 4 March 1993 | Biathlon | World Cup | 15 km | F | (Russia) Anfisa Reztsova | (Italy) Nathalie Santer | (Canada) Myriam Bédard | |
| 4 March 1993 | Biathlon | World Cup | 20 km | M | (Italy) Wilfried Pallhuber | (Germany) Ricco Groß | (Italy) Andreas Zingerle | |
| 6 March 1993 | Biathlon | World Cup | 7.5 km | F | (Russia) Anfisa Reztsova | (Belarus) Svetlana Paramygina | (Germany) Antje Harvey | |
| 6 March 1993 | Biathlon | World Cup | 10 km | M | (Germany) Frank Luck | (Germany) Sven Fischer | (Austria) Ludwig Gredler | |
| 9 March 1993 | Cross-country | World Cup | 5 km C | F | (Norway) Trude Dybendal Hartz | (Russia) Lyubov Yegorova | (Italy) Manuela Di Centa | |
| 9 March 1993 | Cross-country | World Cup | 5 km C | F | (Russia) Lyubov Yegorova | (Italy) Manuela Di Centa | (Russia) Elena Välbe | |
| 8 February 1994 | Combined | Olympics | 15 km | M | (Norway) Fred Børre Lundberg | (Japan) Takanori Kono | (Norway) Bjarte Engen Vik | |
| 9 February 1994 | Combined | Olympics | 3 × 10 km team | M | Japan | Norway | Switzerland | |
| 13 February 1994 | Cross-country | Olympics | 15 km F | F | (Italy) Manuela Di Centa | (Russia) Lyubov Yegorova | (Russia) Nina Gavrilyuk | |
| 14 February 1994 | Cross-country | Olympics | 30 km F | M | (Norway) Thomas Alsgaard | (Norway) Bjørn Dæhlie | (Finland) Mika Myllylä | |
| 15 February 1994 | Cross-country | Olympics | 5 km C | F | (Russia) Lyubov Yegorova | (Italy) Manuela Di Centa | (Finland) Marja-Liisa Kirvesniemi | |
| 17 February 1994 | Cross-country | Olympics | 15 km M pursuit | F | (Russia) Lyubov Yegorova | (Italy) Manuela Di Centa | (Italy) Stefania Belmondo | |
| 17 February 1994 | Cross-country | Olympics | 10 km C | M | (Norway) Bjørn Dæhlie | (Kazakhstan) Vladimir Smirnov | (Italy) Marco Albarello | |
| 18 February 1994 | Biathlon | Olympics | 15 km | F | (Canada) Myriam Bédard | (France) Anne Briand | (Germany) Uschi Disl | |
| 19 February 1994 | Cross-country | Olympics | 25 km M pursuit | M | (Norway) Bjørn Dæhlie | (Kazakhstan) Vladimir Smirnov | (Italy) Silvio Fauner | |
| 20 February 1994 | Biathlon | Olympics | 20 km | M | (Russia) Sergei Tarasov | (Germany) Frank Luck | (Germany) Sven Fischer | |
| 22 February 1994 | Cross-country | Olympics | 4 × 10 km relay | M | Italy | Norway | Finland | |
| 22 February 1994 | Cross-country | Olympics | 4 × 5 km relay | F | Russia | Norway | Italy | |
| 23 February 1994 | Biathlon | Olympics | 15 km | F | (Canada) Myriam Bédard | (Belarus) Svetlana Paramygina | (Ukraine) Valentina Tserbe-Nessina | |
| 23 February 1994 | Biathlon | Olympics | 20 km | M | (Russia) Sergei Tchepikov | (Germany) Ricco Groß | (Russia) Sergei Tarasov | |
| 24 February 1994 | Cross-country | Olympics | 30 km C | F | (Italy) Manuela Di Centa | (Norway) Marit Mikkelsplass | (Finland) Marja-Liisa Kirvesniemi | |
| 25 February 1994 | Biathlon | Olympics | 4 × 7.5 km relay | F | Russia | Germany | France | |
| 26 February 1994 | Biathlon | Olympics | 4 × 7.5 km relay | M | Germany | Russia | France | |
| 27 February 1994 | Cross-country | Olympics | 50 km C | M | (Kazakhstan) Vladimir Smirnov | (Finland) Mika Myllylä | (Norway) Sture Sivertsen | |
| 16 March 1995 | Biathlon | World Cup | 15 km | F | (Russia) Svetlana Paramygina | (Russia) Nadezhda Talanova | (Russia) Galina Koukleva | |
| 16 March 1995 | Biathlon | World Cup | 20 km | M | (Finland) Vesa Hietalahti | (Austria) Ludwig Gredler | (Germany) Peter Sendel | |
| 18 March 1995 | Biathlon | World Cup | 7.5 km | F | (Russia) Galina Koukleva | (France) Anne Briand | (France) Emmanuelle Claret | |
| 18 March 1995 | Biathlon | World Cup | 10 km | M | (Russia) Viktor Maigourov | (Italy) Johann Passler | (Norway) Ole Einar Bjørndalen | |
| 30 November 1996 | Biathlon | World Cup | 15 km | F | (Germany) Petra Behle | (Germany) Simone Greiner-Petter-Memm | (Russia) Olga Melnik | |
| 30 November 1996 | Biathlon | World Cup | 20 km | M | (Germany) Sven Fischer | (Russia) Sergei Tarasov | (Russia) Pavel Rostovtsev | |
| 1 December 1996 | Biathlon | World Cup | 7.5 km | F | (Germany) Simone Greiner-Petter-Memm | (Russia) Galina Koukleva | (Sweden) Magdalena Forsberg | |
| 1 December 1996 | Biathlon | World Cup | 10 km | M | (Germany) Sven Fischer | (Russia) Pavel Rostovtsev | (Italy) René Cattarinussi | |
| 6 December 1997 | Biathlon | World Cup | 10 km | M | (Norway) Frank Luck | (Norway) Ole Einar Bjørndalen | (France) Raphael Poiree | |
| 6 December 1997 | Biathlon | World Cup | 7.5 km | F | (Russia) Galina Koukleva | (Russia) Olga Melnik | (Sweden) Magdalena Forsberg | |
| 7 December 1997 | Biathlon | World Cup | 20 km | M | (Belarus) Alexei Aidarov | (Norway) Halvard Hanevold | (Russia) Pavel Mouslimov | |
| 7 December 1997 | Biathlon | World Cup | 15 km | F | (Russia) Galina Koukleva | (Sweden) Magdalena Forsberg | (Germany) Uschi Disl | |
| 27 November 1998 | Combined | World Cup | 15 km | M | (Norway) Bjarte Engen Vik | (Czech Republic) Ladislav Rygl | (Finland) Hannu Manninen | |
| 29 November 1998 | Combined | World Cup | 7.5 km | M | (Finland) Hannu Manninen | (Austria) Felix Gottwald | (Norway) Bjarte Engen Vik | |
| 5 February 2000 | Cross-country | World Cup | 5+5 km | F | (Russia) Larissa Lazutina | (Russia) Olga Danilova | (Russia) Svetlana Nageykina | |
| 5 February 2000 | Cross-country | World Cup | 10+10 km | M | (Finland) Jari Isometsä | (Spain) Johann Mühlegg | (Austria) Michail Botvinov | |
| 29 December 2000 | Combined | World Cup | 15 km | M | (Norway) Kristian Hammer | (Norway) Bjarte Engen Vik | (Finland) Samppa Lajunen | |
| 30 December 2000 | Combined | World Cup | 7.5 km | M | (Norway) Bjarte Engen Vik | (Finland) Samppa Lajunen | (Czech Republic) Ladislav Rygl | |
| 23 March 2002 | Cross-country | World Cup | 58 km C MS | F | (Norway) Anita Moen | (Norway) Vibeke Skofterud | (Germany) Manuela Henkel | |
| 23 March 2002 | Cross-country | World Cup | 58 km C MS | M | (Norway) Thomas Alsgaard | (Norway) Anders Aukland | (Norway) Frode Estil | |
| 3 December 2005 | Combined | World Cup | 15 km | M | (Finland) Hannu Manninen | (Austria) Felix Gottwald | (Germany) Ronny Ackermann | |
| 3 December 2005 | Combined | World Cup | 7.5 km | M | (Finland) Hannu Manninen | (United States) Todd Lodwick | (Germany) Ronny Ackermann | |
| 2 December 2006 | Combined | World Cup | 15 km | M | (Norway) Magnus Moan | (Germany) Sebastian Haseney | (Finland) Hannu Manninen | |
| 3 December 2006 | Combined | World Cup | 7.5 km | M | (Austria) Christoph Bieler | (Finland) Anssi Koivuranta | (France) Maxime Laheurte | |
| 5 December 2009 | Combined | World Cup | 10 km | M | (France) Jason Lamy-Chappuis | (Norway) Petter Tande | (Germany) Eric Frenzel | |
| 6 December 2009 | Combined | World Cup | 10 km | M | (Germany) Tino Edelmann | (Finland) Anssi Koivuranta | (France) Jason Lamy-Chappuis | |
| 4 December 2010 | Combined | World Cup | 10 km | M | (Norway) Mikko Kokslien | (France) Jason Lamy-Chappuis | (Austria) Felix Gottwald | |
| 5 December 2010 | Combined | World Cup | 10 km | M | (France) Jason Lamy-Chappuis | (Norway) Mikko Kokslien | (Austria) Mario Stecher | |
