= 1983–84 FIS Nordic Combined World Cup =

International skiing competition

Nordic Combined World Cup 1983/84
Winners
- Overall: (Norway) Tom Sandberg
- Nations Cup: Norway

Competitions
- Venues: 7
- Individual: 7

The 1983/84 FIS Nordic Combined World Cup was the first World Cup season, a combination of ski jumping and cross-country skiing organized by International Ski Federation. It started on 17 December 1983 in Seefeld, Austria and ended on 24 March 1984 in Štrbské Pleso, Czechoslovakia.

== Calendar ==
=== Men ===
Num	Season	Date	Place	Hill	Discipline	Winner	Second	Third
1	1	17 December 1983	(Austria) Seefeld	Toni-Seelos-Olympiaschanze	K90 / 15 km	(East Germany) Uwe Dotzauer (United States) Kerry Lynch		(East Germany) Gunter Schmieder
2	2	29 December 1983	(East Germany) Oberwiesenthal	Fichtelbergschanzen	K90 / 15 km	(East Germany) Andreas Langer	(Soviet Union) Alexander Prosvirnin	(East Germany) Uwe Dotzauer
3	3	7 January 1984	(West Germany) Schonach	Langenwaldschanze	K90 / 15 km	(West Germany) Thomas Müller	(Norway) Geir Andersen	(United States) Kerry Lynch
1984 Winter Olympics
4	4	24 February 1984	(Sweden) Falun	Lugnet	K90 / 15 km	(Finland) Rauno Miettinen	(Norway) Tom Sandberg	(Norway) Geir Andersen
5	5	3 March 1984	(Finland) Lahti	Salpausselkä	K113 / 15 km	(West Germany) Thomas Müller	(East Germany) Uwe Dotzauer	(Norway) Geir Andersen
6	6	7-8 March 1984	(Norway) Oslo	Midtstubakken	K105 / 15 km	(Norway) Espen Andersen	(Norway) Tom Sandberg	(Norway) Geir Andersen
7	7	24 March 1984	(Czechoslovakia) Štrbské Pleso	MS 1970 A	K90 / 15 km	(Norway) Tom Sandberg	(East Germany) Uwe Dotzauer	(Austria) Klaus Sulzenbacher

== Standings ==
=== Overall ===
Rank	after 7 events	Points
1	(Norway) Tom Sandberg	103
2	(East Germany) Uwe Dotzauer	89
3	(Norway) Geir Andersen	82
4	(West Germany) Thomas Müller	72
	(Soviet Union) Alexander Prosvirnin	72
6	(Finland) Rauno Miettinen	54
7	(West Germany) Hubert Schwarz	46
8	(Norway) Hallstein Bøgseth	43
	(United States) Kerry Lynch	43
10	(West Germany) Hermann Weinbuch	42

=== Nations Cup ===
Rank	after 7 events	Points
1	Norway	245
2	East Germany	205
3	Soviet Union	169
4	West Germany	140
5	United States	66
6	Finland	64
7	Austria	63
8	Poland	10
9	Czechoslovakia	9
