= Tremplin du Praz =

Ski jumping hill at Le Praz, France

Coordinates: 45.4314°N 6.61639°E

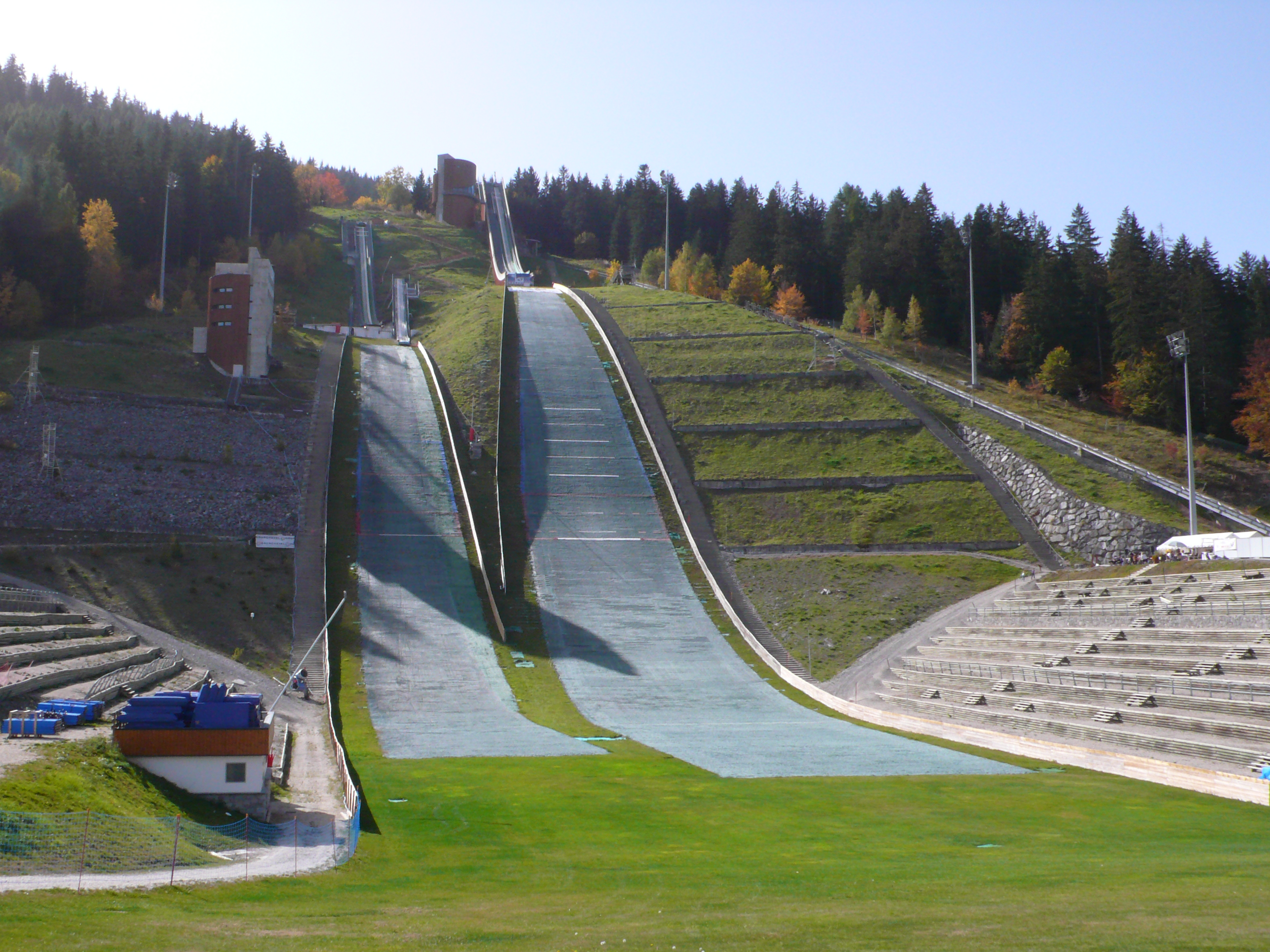
- The normal hill, including the medium in-run, to the left, and the large hill to the right
- Location: Courchevel; France
- Opened: 1990
- Renovated: 2011

Size
- K–point: K25, K60, K90, K125
- Hill size: HS96, HS132
- Hill record: 137 metres (449 ft) (Poland) Kamil Stoch (12 August 2011) (Austria) Daniel Tschofenig (7 August 2022) (Austria) Michael Hayböck (7 August 2022); Nicolas Mayer (K90: 100.5 m in 2010)

Top events
- Olympics: 1992, 2030

The Tremplin du Praz is a ski jumping hill at Le Praz in Courchevel, France. The complex consists of four hills: a large hill with construction point of K125 (HS132), a normal hill at K90 (HS96), and two training hills at K60 and K25. The complex also has a cross-country skiing stadium used for Nordic combined. Jörg Ritzerfeld holds the large hill winter record of 134.0 metres and Nicolas Mayer the normal hill record of 100.5 metres.

Le Praz received its first ski jumping hill in 1944. Ahead of the 1992 Winter Olympics, the large and normal hills were built along with a cross-country stadium to host ski jumping and Nordic combined events. Since 1997, the hill has hosted an annual summer FIS Ski Jumping Grand Prix event. It has also been used for one FIS Ski Jumping World Cup and two FIS Nordic Combined World Cup rounds, in addition to four events of the FIS Ski Jumping Continental Cup. The medium hill opened in 2004 and the small hill in 2008. It will host the Winter Olympics again in 2030 Winter Olympics in the French Alps.

== Construction ==
The first ski jump in Courchevel was built on the location of the large hill in 1944. It was followed by a second in 1955, located in Courchevel 1850. The hills were used to incorporate ski jumping into the Alpine skiing training programs. In 1970, a larger 50-metre hill was built in Courchevel 1850. It was supplemented with a small 25-metre hill in the early 1990s.

In the Albertville bid for the 1992 Winter Olympics, La Praz was designated the host of the ski jumping and Nordic combined events. The site was chosen because it was sheltered from the wind, had good exposure to the sun and predictable snowfall. Planning for the new venue started in 1988, after Albertville had been selected to host the games. The hills were designed so both could be used simultaneously, if desired. During the 1988 Winter Olympics, the ski jumps at Canada Olympic Park were subject to strong winds and several of the competitions were postponed. To avoid such inconveniences, Tremplin du Praz was built into the mountain side to minimize wind exposure. Although the size of the hills remained the same, the 1992 Olympics were the first to measure the sizes in construction points (K-points).

In 2004, the venue was upgraded for €1 million by installing a K60 inrun between the normal and large hill. This allowed the medium inrun to use the same outrun as the normal hill. In 2008, a small K25 hill, named Ninoufbakken, was installed slightly away from the main hills. The venue's certificate was due to expire in 2011, after which the venue would have to meet the International Ski Federation's (FIS) latest regulations. A €1.5 million upgrade program was initiated, which saw the inruns renovated, including installation of the Ski-Line track system and new Porsgrund ceramic tracks. The outruns saw new plastic mats and a new sprinkler system. The Nordic House, a sports centre, was also built. Construction started on the normal hill in May 2011 and on the large hill in August 2011, with completion scheduled for early 2012.

== Facilities ==
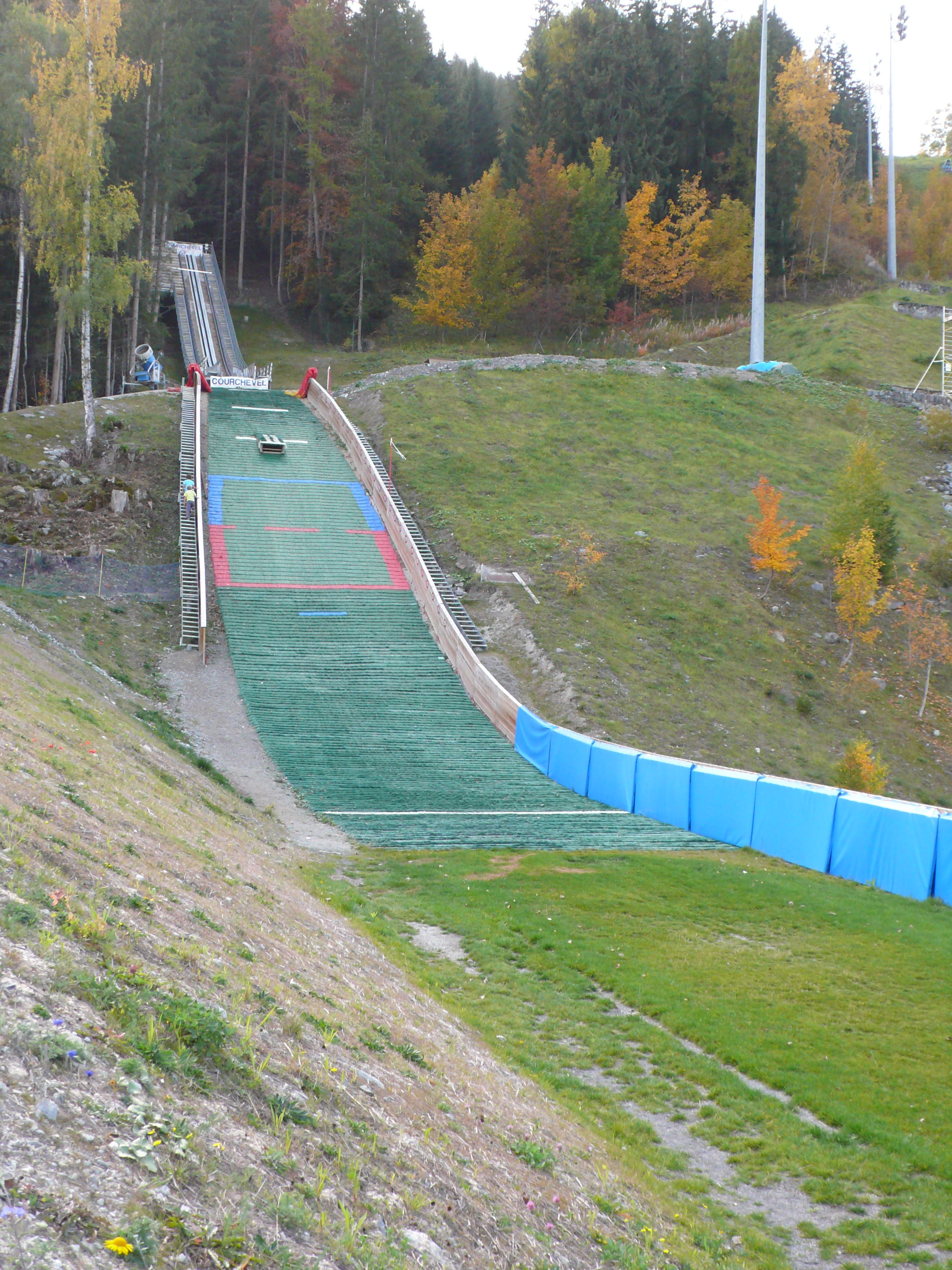
The K-25 hill, which opened in 2008

The venue is located in Le Praz, also known as Courchevel 1300, a village at the base of the Courchevel skiing resort. The venue is 1,300 m (4,300 ft) above mean sea level and consists of four jumps. Since August 2017 the large hill has a new K-point of K125 and a hill size of HS137. From the 2023 the hill has the dimensions K-125 and HS132. All as a result of the FIS inspection in May, which forced several changes on the hill in order to grant a provisional homologation of the facility. The normal hill has a K-point of K90 and a hill size of HS96. The medium hill, with a K-point of K60 and hill size of HS65, shares its outrun with the normal hill. The small hill, Ninoufbakken, has a K-point of K-25 and a hill size of HS30 and is located away from the rest of the complex. The large and normal hill have a take-off angle of 11.5° and 10.5°, and a landing angle of 37.5° and 36°, respectively.

The venue covers an area of 0.4 hectares (1 acre) and features a judge tower, distance and speed measuring equipment, a weather station, snowmaking equipment, scoreboards and athlete preparation cubicles. The venue has 50 commentator booths, a VIP area and stands for 23,000 spectators. Auxiliary facilities include a medical centre, a 900 m^{2} (9,700 sq ft) press and conference centre and 7,000 m^{2} (75,000 sq ft) of parking. The Nordic House consists of rooms for organizers, accommodation for ski jumpers, stands for 200 spectators, a sports hall and a fitness centre.

Adjacent to the hills is stadium used for cross-country part of Nordic combined. The stadium area is 0.2 hectares (0.49 acres) and is made up of a timing and jury tower and preparation cubicles. There is capacity for 15,000 spectators. For the Olympics, a 5 km (3.1 mi) long loop was added, which ran around the village to the neighboring village of Saint-Bon and back. Roads were crossed on wooden bridges and underpasses. The loop involved an extra round around the stadium area, with an altitude difference of 84 m (276 ft) and a maximum climb of 43 m (141 ft). The total climb for the 15 kilometre individual Olympic race was 546 metres (1,791 ft) and for the 3 × 10 kilometre 346 m (1,135 ft). Cross-country proper was held at Les Saisies.

== Events ==
=== Men ===
Date	Hillsize	Competition	Winner	Second	Third
9 February 1992	K90	OG	(Austria) Ernst Vettori	(Austria) Martin Höllwarth	(Finland) Toni Nieminen
16 February 1992	K120	OG	(Finland) Toni Nieminen	(Austria) Martin Höllwarth	(Austria) Heinz Kuttin
20 February 1992	K120	OG-T	(Finland) Finland; Ari-Pekka Nikkola; Mika Laitinen; Risto Laakkonen; Toni Nieminen	(Austria) Austria; Heinz Kuttin; Ernst Vettori; Martin Höllwarth; Andreas Felder	(Czechoslovakia) Czechoslovakia; Tomáš Goder; František Jež; Jaroslav Sakala; Jiří Parma
17 December 1993	K120	WC	(Austria) Andreas Goldberger	(Japan) Jinya Nishikata	(Czech Republic) Jaroslav Sakala

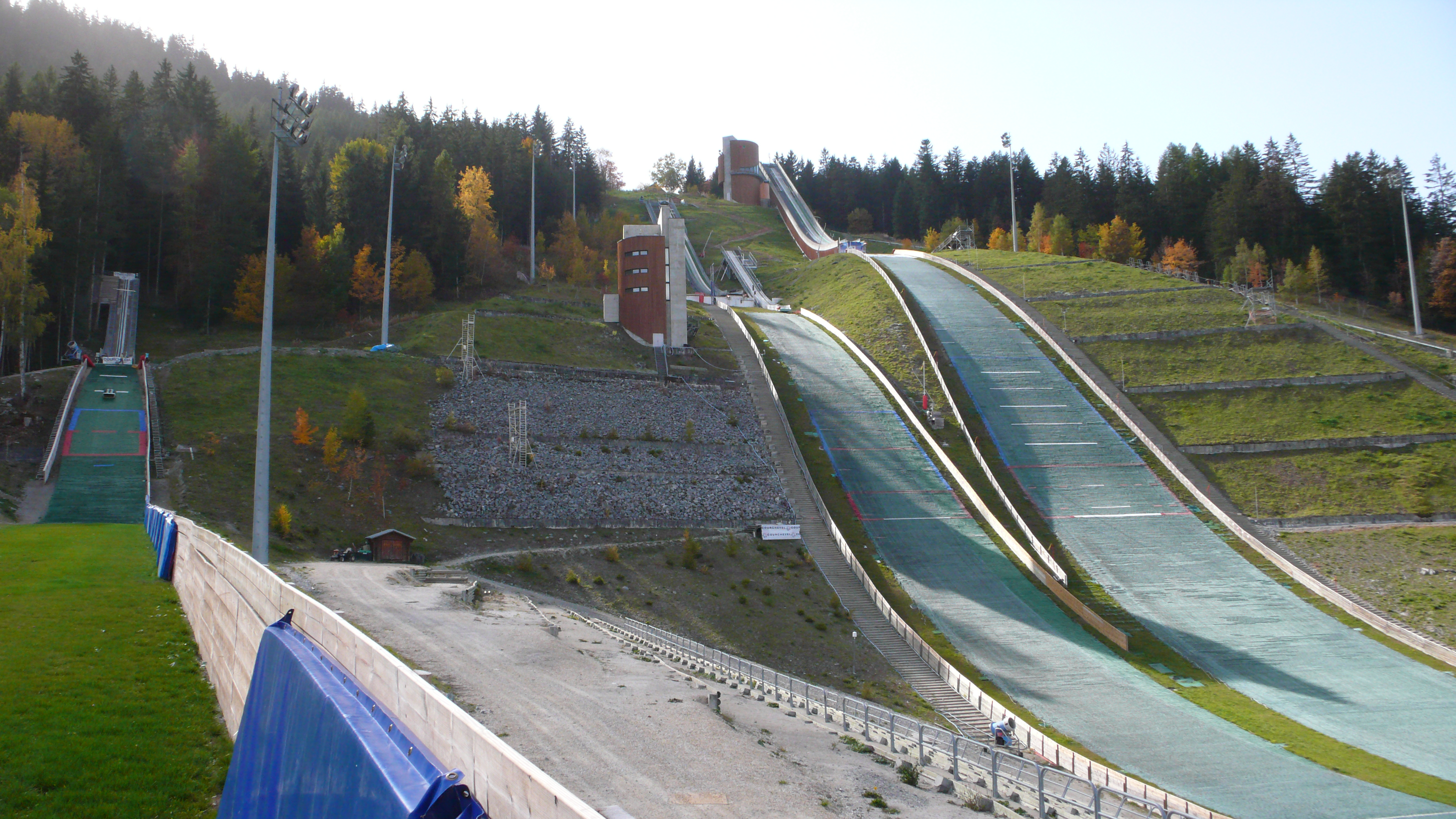
All four hills

Tremplin du Praz hosted the ski jumping events and the ski jumping part of the Nordic combined at the 1992 Winter Olympics. The format went unchanged from the previous games, but the Albertville Olympics were the first to see the mainstream use of V-style. The large hill competition was won by Austria's Ernst Vettori, the normal hill event was won by Finland's Toni Nieminen and the team event was won by Finland. Nieminen, Vettori and Austria's Martin Höllwarth collected medals in all three events. In Nordic combined, France won a double with Fabrice Guy and Sylvain Guillaume in the individual event, while Japan won the team event.

The hill was scheduled to host two FIS Ski Jumping World Cup events in January 1991, but they had to be cancelled due to lack of snow. In 1993, the hills hosted a single large hill World Cup event. Since 1997, Tremplin du Praz has been used annually for the FIS Ski Jumping Grand Prix, the premier international summer ski jumping tournament. Originally it consisted of a single competition in the large hill, but from 2010, a qualification run was introduced the day before the main event. The venue has hosted the FIS Ski Jumping Continental Cup four times, in 2000, 2002, 2010 and 2011. In February 2006, the venue hosted two FIS Cup competitions in the normal hill. In January 2007, Courchevel hosted two rounds of a FIS-organized junior ski jump in the normal hill. In Nordic combined, the venue has hosted the FIS Nordic Combined World Cup twice, in 1991 and 1992. It also held a World Cup B event in 1997. The venue has been a popular training venue for national teams, and Germany often holds summer training in Courchevel.

The hill record in the large hill is 134.0 metres, set by Germany's Jörg Ritzerfeld in 2002. However, in the summer the record is 137.0 metres, set by Poland's Kamil Stoch in 2011. For the normal hill, the record of 100.5 metres was recorded by Nicolas Mayer in 2010.
