= Nordic skiing at the 1994 Winter Olympics =

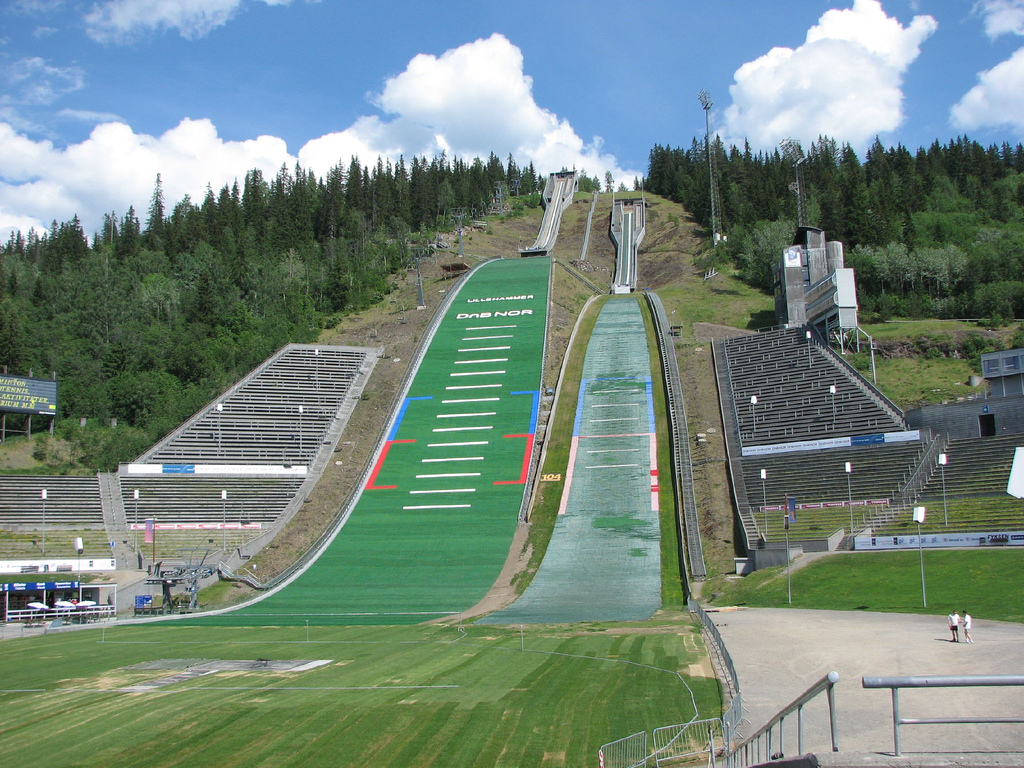
Lysgårdsbakken ski jumping hill in Lillehammer, Norway.

At the 1994 Winter Olympics, fifteen Nordic skiing events were contested – ten cross-country skiing events, three ski jumping events, and two Nordic combined events. The program of events was unchanged from the previous Games two years earlier.

Nordic skiing discipline	Men's events	Women's events
Cross-country skiing	• 10 km (classical)	• 5 km (classical)
Cross-country skiing	• 15 km pursuit	• 10 km pursuit
Cross-country skiing	• 30 km (classical)	• 15 km (classical)
Cross-country skiing	• 50 km (freestyle)	• 30 km (freestyle)
Cross-country skiing	• 4 × 10 km relay	• 4 × 5 km relay
Ski jumping	• Large hill – individual	none
Ski jumping	• Normal hill – individual	none
Ski jumping	• Large hill – team	none
Nordic combined	• Individual	none
Nordic combined	• Team	none
