= FIS Nordic World Ski Championships 1993 =

International Nordic skiing competition

- Official logo for the FIS Nordic World Ski Championships 1993.
- Host city: Falun
- Country: Sweden
- Events: 15
- Opening: 19 February 1993
- Closing: 28 February 1993
- Main venue: Lugnet

The FIS Nordic World Ski Championships 1993 took place 19–28 February 1993 in Falun, Sweden, for the third time (1954, 1974). This event saw the creation of the combined pursuit where competitors would skate one distance in the classical interval style (10 km: men, 5 km: women) one day, then follow the next day in the freestyle pursuit (15 km: men, 10 km: women) with the first distance winner going first in the pursuit. Additionally it was the first competition since the breakup of the Soviet Union in late 1991 and the first competition with Czechoslovakia having been split up as the Czech Republic and Slovakia, however, the two nations competed as combined teams in women's relay in cross-country skiing and team large hill in ski jumping.

== Men's cross-country ==
=== 10 km classical ===
22 February 1993

Medal	Athlete	Time
Gold	Sture Sivertsen (NOR)	24:51.6
Silver	Vladimir Smirnov (KAZ)	24:55.5
Bronze	Vegard Ulvang (NOR)	24:58.1

=== 10 km + 15 km combined pursuit ===
24 February 1993

Medal	Athlete	Time
Gold	Bjørn Dæhlie (NOR)	1:01:45.0
Silver	Vladimir Smirnov (KAZ)	1:01:45.0
Bronze	Silvio Fauner (ITA)	1:02:55.5

Dæhlie edged Smirnov at the finish line to earn the gold medal. Smirnov later stated that he lost out to Dæhlie by "only 16 centimeters".

=== 30 km classical ===
20 February 1993

Medal	Athlete	Time
Gold	Bjørn Dæhlie (NOR)	1:17:33.6
Silver	Vegard Ulvang (NOR)	1:17:55.0
Bronze	Vladimir Smirnov (KAZ)	1:17:55.3

=== 50 km freestyle ===
28 February 1993

Medal	Athlete	Time
Gold	Torgny Mogren (SWE)	2:03:36.8
Silver	Hervé Balland (FRA)	2:04:30.9
Bronze	Bjørn Dæhlie (NOR)	2:05:10.3

=== 4 × 10 km relay ===
26 February 1993

Medal	Team	Time
Gold	Norway (Sture Sivertsen, Vegard Ulvang, Terje Langli, Bjørn Dæhlie)	1:44:14.9
Silver	Italy (Maurilio De Zolt, Marco Albarello, Giorgio Vanzetta, Silvio Fauner)	1:44:24.5
Bronze	Russia (Andrey Kirillov, Igor Badamshin, Alexey Prokourorov, Mikhail Botvinov)	1:44:27.2

== Women's cross-country ==
=== 5 km classical ===
21 February 1993

Medal	Athlete	Time
Gold	Larisa Lazutina (RUS)	14:07.6
Silver	Lyubov Yegorova (RUS)	14:12.1
Bronze	Trude Dybendahl (NOR)	14:18.3

=== 5 km + 10 km combined pursuit ===
23 February 1993

Medal	Athlete	Time
Gold	Stefania Belmondo (ITA)	40:19.0
Silver	Larisa Lazutina (RUS)	40:19.4
Bronze	Lyubov Yegorova (RUS)	40:19.7

=== 15 km classical ===
19 February 1993

Medal	Athlete	Time
Gold	Yelena Välbe (RUS)	44:49.0
Silver	Marja-Liisa Kirvesniemi (FIN)	45:39.0
Bronze	Marjut Rolig (FIN)	45:41.9

Välbe was the first Russian to win a gold medal in the aftermath of the Soviet Union's breakup in late 1991.

=== 30 km freestyle ===
27 February 1993

Medal	Athlete	Time
Gold	Stefania Belmondo (ITA)	1:22:41.3
Silver	Manuela Di Centa (ITA)	1:22:55.0
Bronze	Lyubov Yegorova (RUS)	1:23:48.3

=== 4 × 5 km relay ===
25 February 1993

Medal	Team	Time
Gold	Russia (Yelena Välbe, Larisa Lazutina, Nina Gavrylyuk, Lyubov Yegorova)	54:15.7
Silver	Italy (Gabriella Paruzzi, Bice Vanzetta, Manuela Di Centa, Stefania Belmondo)	54:35.1
Bronze	Norway (Trude Dybendahl, Inger Helene Nybråten, Anita Moen, Elin Nilsen)	55:09.0

== Men's Nordic combined ==
=== 15 km individual Gundersen ===
18 February 1993

Medal	Athlete	Time
Gold	Kenji Ogiwara (JPN)	46.47.5
Silver	Knut Tore Apeland (NOR)	+ 1.34.5
Bronze	Trond Einar Elden (NOR)	+ 2.32.6

=== 3 × 10 km team ===
25 February 1993

Medal	Team	Time
Gold	Japan (Takanori Kono, Masashi Abe, Kenji Ogiwara)	1:19:25.7
Silver	Norway (Trond Einar Elden, Knut Tore Apeland, Fred Børre Lundberg)	+3:46.3
Bronze	Germany (Thomas Dufter, Jens Deimel, Hans-Peter Pohl)	+8:30.5

Japan's four-minute victory margin at this event, followed by their nearly five-minute victory at the Winter Olympics in Lillehammer the following year, would lead the FIS to change the Nordic combined team event from a 3 x 10 km relay to a 4 x 5 km relay that would become effective at the FIS Nordic World Ski Championships 1995 in Thunder Bay and the 1998 Winter Olympics in Nagano. This was in an effort to lessen the emphasis on the ski jumping part of the competition.

== Men's ski jumping ==
=== Individual normal hill ===
27 February 1993

Medal	Athlete	Points
Gold	Masahiko Harada (JPN)	237.8
Silver	Andreas Goldberger (AUT)	231.3
Bronze	Jaroslav Sakala (CZE)	228.2

=== Individual large hill ===
21 February 1993

Medal	Athlete	Points
Gold	Espen Bredesen (NOR)	241.4
Silver	Jaroslav Sakala (CZE)	239.1
Bronze	Andreas Goldberger (AUT)	237.6

Sakala was the first Czech to medal following Czechoslovakia's breakup earlier that year into the Czech Republic and Slovakia.

=== Team large hill ===
23 February 1993

Medal	Team	Points
Gold	Norway (Bjørn Myrbakken, Helge Brendryen, Øyvind Berg, Espen Bredesen)	821.5
Silver	Czech Republic (František Jež, Jiří Parma, Jaroslav Sakala); Slovakia (Martin Švagerko) (combined team)	772.1
Bronze	Austria (Ernst Vettori, Heinz Kuttin, Stefan Horngacher, Andreas Goldberger)	745.4

The Czech Republic and Slovakia competed as a combined team despite their countries' agreement to split from Czechoslovakia on 25 November 1992. The country's split was made after the team had been selected prior to the championships.

== Medal table ==
Medal winners by nation.

* Host nation (Sweden)

Rank	Nation	Gold	Silver	Bronze	Total
1	Norway	6	3	5	14
2	Russia	3	2	3	8
3	Japan	3	0	0	3
4	Italy	2	3	1	6
5	Sweden*	1	0	0	1
6	Czech Republic	0	2	1	3
6	Kazakhstan	0	2	1	3
8	Austria	0	1	2	3
9	Finland	0	1	1	2
10	France	0	1	0	1
11	Germany	0	0	1	1
Totals (11 entries)		15	15	15	45
