= František Jež =

Czech ski jumper (born 1970)

Personal information
- Nationality: Czechoslovakia; Czech Republic
- Born: 16 December 1970 (age 55) Valašské Meziříčí, Czechoslovakia
- Height: 175 cm (5 ft 9 in)

Sport
- Sport: Skiing

World Cup career
- Seasons: 1988–1999
- Indiv. starts: 164
- Indiv. podiums: 7
- Indiv. wins: 4
- Team starts: 5
Medal record
Men's ski jumping
Olympic Games
Bronze medal – third place	1992 Albertville	Team LH
FIS Nordic World Ski Championships
Silver medal – second place	1993 Falun	Team LH
- Updated on 10 February 2016

František Jež (Czech pronunciation: [ˈfrancɪʃɛk ˈjɛʃ]; born 16 December 1970) is a Czech former ski jumper.

== Career ==
At the 1992 Winter Olympics in Albertville, he won a bronze medal in the Team Large Hill. Jež also won a silver medal in the team large hill at the 1993 FIS Nordic World Ski Championships in Falun. His biggest successes were in 1990 when he won four times at the FIS Ski jumping World Cup.

== World Cup ==
=== Standings ===
Season	Overall	4H	SF	NT	JP
1987/88	—	23	N/A	N/A	N/A
1988/89	—	43	N/A	N/A	N/A
1989/90	5	2nd place, silver medalist(s)	N/A	N/A	N/A
1990/91	21	29	25	N/A	N/A
1991/92	7	5	19	N/A	N/A
1992/93	37	36	—	N/A	N/A
1993/94	56	44	—	N/A	N/A
1994/95	37	41	32	N/A	N/A
1995/96	28	17	16	N/A	30
1996/97	47	38	—	29	44
1997/98	46	23	—	—	44
1998/99	—	—	—	—	—

=== Wins ===
No.	Season	Date	Location	Hill	Size
1	1989/90	6 January 1990	(Austria) Bischofshofen	Paul-Ausserleitner-Schanze K111	LH
2	1989/90	7 February 1990	(Switzerland) St. Moritz	Olympiaschanze K94	NH
3	1989/90	9 February 1990	(Switzerland) Gstaad	Mattenschanze K88	NH
4	1989/90	18 February 1990	(Italy) Predazzo	Trampolino dal Ben K120	LH
