= Josef Kovařík =

Czech Nordic combined skier (born 1966)

Josef Kovařík (born 27 April 1966) was a Czech Nordic combined skier who competed from 1991 to 1993. He finished sixth in the 3 × 10 km team event at the 1992 Winter Olympics in Albertville.

Kovařík's only career victories were in two 15 km individual events in 1991 and 1993.
