= Peter Heli =

Estonian Nordic combined skier (born 1969)

Personal information
- Nationality: Estonian
- Born: 27 February 1969 (age 56); Tallinn, Estonia

Sport
- Sport: Nordic combined, floorball

Peter Heli (born 27 February 1969) is an Estonian skier and floorball player. He competed in the Nordic combined event at the 1992 Winter Olympics. Heli placed 11th in floorball at the 1996 World Championships.
