= Sergey Shvagirev =

Soviet Nordic combined skier

Personal information
- Nationality: Soviet
- Born: 4 April 1970 (age 54)

Sport
- Sport: Nordic combined

Sergey Shvagirev (born 4 April 1970) is a Soviet skier. He competed in the Nordic combined event at the 1992 Winter Olympics.
