= Levandi =

Family name

Levandi is an Estonian surname. Notable people with the surname include:

- Allar Levandi (born 1965), Estonian Nordic combined skier
- Anna Levandi (born 1965), Soviet figure skater
- Arlet Levandi (born 2005), Estonian figure skater
