= Hisao Katō =

Japanese politician

- 加藤 久雄

17th Mayor of Nagano
- In office 11 November 2013 – 10 November 2021
- Preceded by: Shouichi Washizawa
- Succeeded by: Kenji Ogiwara

Personal details
- Born: 8 November 1942 (age 83) Nagano, Japan
- Party: Independent
- Education: Waseda University

Hisao Katō (加藤 久雄, Katou Hisao) (born November 8, 1942) is a Japanese politician, and the current mayor of the city of Nagano, the capital of Nagano Prefecture, in central Japan. Katō won his first mayoral election, as an independent, on October 27, 2013, winning 56,424 votes compared to 34,656 for the second-place finisher. On October 29, 2017, Katō was reelected to a second term, winning 69,778 votes. In his second election, he was backed by the LDP, Komeito, and the DP.

Katō graduated from Nagano Prefectural Nagano Senior High School in 1961. He then graduated from the Department of Political Economy and Economics at Waseda University in 1965. He worked for several corporations before becoming Chairman of the Nagano Chamber of Commerce and Industry in 2007. In 2009, he became director of Shinano Railway.

As mayor, Katō led the city government in providing a one billion yen investment in the University of Nagano, a prefectural university that opened in the city of Nagano in 2018. One of Kato's stated reasons for supporting the prefectural university is to encourage university young people to remain in the prefecture after graduating.

Katō, as Mayor of Nagano, and his counterpart in the nearby City of Matsumoto, supported a proposal from the Japan Gerontological Society to redefine the age of senior citizens from 65 years to 75 years or older. Katō stated that senior citizens "have more physical and mental stamina than before".

== Mayoralty elections ==
Mayoral Candidate, 27 October, 2013	Vote
Hisao Katō	56,424
Yoko Takashima	34,656
Toshio Sugeta	19,496
Hiroshi Kawai	9,968
Masayuki Hashimoto	7,681

Mayoral Candidate29 October, 2017	Vote
Hisao Katō	69,778
Ryuichiro Tsuchiya	52,812
