= Tsugiharu Ogiwara =

Japanese Nordic combined skier (born 1969)

Medal record

Men's Nordic combined

World Championships
Gold medal – first place	1995 Thunder Bay	4 x 5 km team

Tsugiharu Ogiwara (荻原 次晴, Ogiwara Tsugiharu) (born 20 December 1969) is a Japanese Nordic combined skier who competed from 1994 to 1998. He won the 4 x 5 km team event at the 1995 FIS Nordic World Ski Championships in Thunder Bay, Ontario.

Ogiwara's best individual finish at the Winter Olympics was 6th at Nagano in 1998. He had two individual career victories (1993: 15 km individual, 1998: 7.5 km sprint).

He is the twin brother of Kenji Ogiwara, a fellow Japanese Nordic combined athlete.
