= Stefan Kreiner =

Austrian Nordic combined skier

Medal record

Men's Nordic combined

Representing Austria

Olympic Games
Bronze medal – third place	1992 Albertville	3 x 10 km team

Stefan Kreiner (born 30 October 1973) is a former Austrian Nordic combined skier who competed during the 1990s. He won a bronze in the 3 x 10 km team event at the 1992 Winter Olympics in Albertville.
