= Halldor Skard =

Norwegian Nordic combined skier

Medal record

Men's Nordic combined

Olympic Games
Gold medal – first place	1998 Nagano	4 x 5 km team

World Championships
Gold medal – first place	1997 Trondheim	4 x 5 km team
Silver medal – second place	1995 Thunder Bay	4 x 5 km team

Halldor Skard (born 11 April 1973 in Oslo) is a former Norwegian Nordic combined skier who competed from 1990 to 2000. He won the 4 x 5 km team Event at the 1998 Winter Olympics in Nagano. Skard also won two medals in the 4 x 5 km team Event at the FIS Nordic World Ski Championships with a gold in 1997 and a silver in 1995.
