= Thomas Dufter =

German Nordic combined skier (born 1966)

Medal record

Men's Nordic combined

World Championships
Bronze medal – third place	1993 Falun	3 x 10 km team

Thomas Dufter (born 20 December 1966 in Inzell) is a former German Nordic combined skier who competed during the late 1980s and early 1990s. He won a bronze medal in the 3 x 10 km team event at the 1993 FIS Nordic World Ski Championships in Falun.

Dufter's lone individual victory was in a World Cup event at Planica, Yugoslavia in 1990.
