= Masashi Abe =

Japanese Nordic combined skier

Masashi Abe 阿部 雅司
Personal information
- Nationality: Japan
- Born: 13 August 1965 (age 61) Obira, Hokkaido, Japan

Sport
- Sport: Skiing
Medal record
Men's Nordic combined
Representing Japan
Olympic Games
Gold medal – first place	1994 Lillehammer	3 x 5 km team
World Championships
Gold medal – first place	1993 Falun	3 x 10 km team
Gold medal – first place	1995 Thunder Bay	4 x 5 km team
Bronze medal – third place	1991 Val di Fiemme	3 x 10 km team

Masashi Abe (阿部 雅司, Abe Masashi) (born August 13, 1965) is a Japanese Nordic combined skier who competed during the late 1980s and early 1990s. He won the 3 x 10 km team event at the 1994 Winter Olympics in Lillehammer. Abe also won three medals in the team event at the FIS Nordic World Ski Championships with golds in 1993 (3 x 10 km) and 1995 (4 x 5 km), and a bronze in 1991 (3 x 10 km).
