= Bård Jørgen Elden =

Norwegian Nordic combined skier

Medal record

Men's Nordic combined

Representing Norway

World Championships
Gold medal – first place	1989 Lahti	3 x 10 km team

Bård Jørgen Elden (born 17 June 1968) is a former Norwegian Nordic combined skier who competed from 1987 to 1997. At the 1989 FIS Nordic World Ski Championships in Lahti, he won a gold medal in the 3 x 10 km team event. He is now the national team coach for Austria and recently won the team competition in the World Championships in Oslo, Holmenkollen 2011.

Elden's only individual career victory occurred in Austria in 1989.

Elden has also been national team coach and chief executive for the American Nordic combined national team. The brother of former Nordic combined and cross-country skier Trond Einar Elden, he represented Namdalseid IL during his career.
