= Klaus Ofner =

Austrian Nordic combined skier

Medal record

Men's Nordic combined

Olympic Games
Bronze medal – third place	1992 Albertville	3 x 10 km team

World Championships
Gold medal – first place	1991 Val di Fiemme	3 x 10 km team
Bronze medal – third place	1991 Val di Fiemme	15 km individual

Klaus Ofner (born 15 August 1968 in Murau, Steiermark) is an Austrian Nordic combined skier who competed during the late 1980s and early 1990s. He won a bronze medal in the Nordic combined 3 x 10 km team event at the 1992 Winter Olympics in Albertville.

Ofner also won two medals at the 1991 FIS Nordic World Ski Championships in Val di Fiemme with gold in the 3 x 10 km team event and bronze in the 15 km individual event.
