= FIS Nordic World Ski Championships 1995 =

Annual ski competition

- Official logo for the FIS Nordic World Ski Championships 1995.
- Host city: Thunder Bay, Canada
- Events: 15
- Opening: 9 March 1995
- Closing: 19 March 1995
- Main venue: Big Thunder

The FIS Nordic World Ski Championships 1995 took place 9–19 March 1995 in Thunder Bay, Ontario, Canada. This marked the second time the separate championships (not part of Winter Olympics) were held outside Europe (the first was in the US towns of Lake Placid, New York, and Rumford, Maine, in 1950). The Nordic combined team event was changed from a 3 × 10 km relay to a 4 × 5 km relay for these championships.

== Men's cross-country ==
=== 10 km classical ===
11 March 1995

Medal	Athlete	Time
Gold	Vladimir Smirnov (KAZ)	24:52.3
Silver	Bjørn Dæhlie (NOR)	25:10.1
Bronze	Mika Myllylä (FIN)	25:11.5

=== 10 km + 15 km combined pursuit ===
13 March 1995

Medal	Athlete	Time
Gold	Vladimir Smirnov (KAZ)	1:06:19.5
Silver	Silvio Fauner (ITA)	1:06:29.7
Bronze	Jari Isometsä (FIN)	1:06:30.0

=== 30 km classical ===
9 March 1995

Medal	Athlete	Time
Gold	Vladimir Smirnov (KAZ)	1:15:52.3
Silver	Bjørn Dæhlie (NOR)	1:16:52.4
Bronze	Alexey Prokurorov (RUS)	1:17:35.6

=== 50 km freestyle ===
19 March 1995

Medal	Athlete	Time
Gold	Silvio Fauner (ITA)	1:56:36.0
Silver	Bjørn Dæhlie (NOR)	1:57:48.5
Bronze	Vladimir Smirnov (KAZ)	1:58:10.7

This marks the first recorded time the 50 km was completed in under two hours.

=== 4 × 10 km relay ===
17 March 1995

Medal	Team	Time
Gold	Norway (Sture Sivertsen, Erling Jevne, Bjørn Dæhlie, Thomas Alsgaard)	1:34:27.1
Silver	Finland (Karri Hietamäki, Harri Kirvesniemi, Jari Räsänen, Jari Isometsä)	1:35:10.5
Bronze	Italy (Fulvio Valbusa, Marco Albarello, Fabio Maj, Silvio Fauner)	1:36:28.4

== Women's cross-country ==
=== 5 km classical ===
12 March 1995

Medal	Athlete	Time
Gold	Larisa Lazutina (RUS)	15:23.7
Silver	Nina Gavrylyuk (RUS)	15:47.1
Bronze	Manuela Di Centa (ITA)	15:57.8

=== 5 km + 10 km combined pursuit ===
14 March 1995

Medal	Athlete	Time
Gold	Larisa Lazutina (RUS)	43:19.6
Silver	Nina Gavrylyuk (RUS)	43:45.3
Bronze	Olga Danilova (RUS)	43:56.9

=== 15 km classical ===
10 March 1995

Medal	Athlete	Time
Gold	Larisa Lazutina (RUS)	41:27.5
Silver	Yelena Välbe (RUS)	42:39.1
Bronze	Inger Helene Nybråten (NOR)	43:03.2

=== 30 km freestyle ===
18 March 1995

Medal	Athlete	Time
Gold	Yelena Välbe (RUS)	1:16:27.3
Silver	Manuela Di Centa (ITA)	1:16:40.5
Bronze	Antonina Ordina (SWE)	1:16:58.6

=== 4 × 5 km relay ===
17 March 1995

Medal	Team	Time
Gold	Russia (Olga Danilova, Yelena Välbe, Larisa Lazutina, Nina Gavrylyuk)	53:47.6
Silver	Norway (Marit Mikkelsplass, Inger Helene Nybråten, Elin Nilsen, Anita Moen-Guidon)	55:18.6
Bronze	Sweden (Anna Frithioff, Marie-Helene Östlund, Antonina Ordina, Anette Fanqvist)	55:18.7

== Men's Nordic combined ==
=== 15 km individual Gundersen ===
9 March 1995

Medal	Athlete	Time
Gold	Fred Børre Lundberg (NOR)	44.19.9
Silver	Jari Mantila (FIN)	+ 30.3
Bronze	Sylvain Guillaume (FRA)	+ 39.7

=== 4 × 5 km team ===
10 March 1995

Medal	Team	Time
Gold	Japan (Masashi Abe, Tsugiharu Ogiwara, Kenji Ogiwara, Takanori Kono)	56:20.2
Silver	Norway (Halldor Skard, Bjarte Engen Vik, Knut Tore Apeland, Fred Børre Lundberg)	58:14.8
Bronze	Switzerland (Markus Wüst, Armin Krugel, Stefan Wittwer, Jean-Yves Cuendet)	1:01:41.9

== Men's ski jumping ==
=== Individual normal hill ===
12 March 1995

Medal	Athlete	Points
Gold	Takanobu Okabe (JPN)	266.0
Silver	Hiroya Saito (JPN)	256.5
Bronze	Mika Laitinen (FIN)	243.5

=== Individual large hill ===
18 March 1995

Medal	Athlete	Points
Gold	Tommy Ingebrigtsen (NOR)	272.6
Silver	Andreas Goldberger (AUT)	259.5
Bronze	Jens Weißflog (GER)	229.9

=== Team large hill ===
16 March 1995

Medal	Team	Points
Gold	Finland (Jani Soininen, Janne Ahonen, Mika Laitinen, Ari-Pekka Nikkola)	889.0
Silver	Germany (Jens Weißflog, Gerd Siegmund, Hansjörg Jäkle, Dieter Thoma)	882.5
Bronze	Japan (Takanobu Okabe, Jinya Nishikata, Hiroya Saito, Naoki Yasuzaki)	836.9

== Medal table ==
Medal winners by nation. The host country, Canada, did not get any medals.

Rank	Nation	Gold	Silver	Bronze	Total
1	Russia (RUS)	5	3	2	10
2	Norway (NOR)	3	5	1	9
3	Kazakhstan (KAZ)	3	0	1	4
4	Japan (JPN)	2	1	1	4
5	Finland (FIN)	1	2	3	6
6	Italy (ITA)	1	2	2	5
7	Germany (GER)	0	1	1	2
8	Austria (AUT)	0	1	0	1
9	Sweden (SWE)	0	0	2	2
10	France (FRA)	0	0	1	1
10	Switzerland (SUI)	0	0	1	1
Totals (11 entries)		15	15	15	45
