= Nordic combined at the 1994 Winter Olympics =

Nordic combined at the XVII Olympic Winter Games
- Venue: Lysgårdsbakken (ski jumping); Birkebeineren Ski Stadium (cross-country skiing)
- Dates: February 18–24, 1994
- No. of events: 2
- Competitors: 53 from 16 nations

Nordic combined at the 1994 Winter Olympics, consisted of two events, held from 18 February to 24 February. The ski jumping portion took place at Lysgårdsbakken, while the cross-country portion took place at Birkebeineren Ski Stadium.

== Medal summary ==
=== Medal table ===
Rank	Nation	Gold	Silver	Bronze	Total
1	Norway	1	1	1	3
2	Japan	1	1	0	2
3	Switzerland	0	0	1	1
Totals (3 entries)		2	2	2	6

The Norwegians led the medal table, winning one of each type of medal.

=== Events ===
Event	Gold		Silver		Bronze	
Individual	Fred Børre Lundberg; Norway	39:07.9	Takanori Kono; Japan	40:25.4	Bjarte Engen Vik; Norway	40:26.2
Team	Japan; Masashi Abe; Takanori Kono; Kenji Ogiwara	1:22:51.8	Norway; Bjarte Engen Vik; Knut Tore Apeland; Fred Børre Lundberg	1:27:40.9	Switzerland; Jean-Yves Cuendet; Andreas Schaad; Hippolyt Kempf	1:30:39.9

== Participating National Olympic Committees ==
Sixteen nations participated in Nordic combined at the Lillehammer Games. Belarus, the Czech Republic, Russia, Slovakia and Ukraine made their Olympic Nordic combined debuts.

- Austria (4)
- Belarus (1)
- Czech Republic (4)
- Estonia (4)
- Finland (4)
- France (4)
- Germany (4)
- Italy (3)
- Japan (4)
- Norway (4)
- Poland (1)
- Russia (4)
- Switzerland (4)
- Slovakia (3)
- Ukraine (1)
- United States (4)
