= Nordic combined at the 1992 Winter Olympics =

Nordic combined at the XVI Olympic Winter Games
- Pictogram for Nordic combined
- Venue: Courchevel
- Dates: February 11–17, 1992
- No. of events: 2
- Competitors: 46 from 12 nations

The Nordic combined event at the 1992 Winter Olympics consisted of two athletic disciplines (ski jumping and cross-country skiing), held from 11 February to 17 February. The ski jumping portion and the 15 km cross-country portion of the Nordic Combined event were both held at Courchevel-le Praz. A temporary cross-country stadium was constructed in a field directly adjacent (east) to the Tremplin du Praz ski jump outrun. All other cross-country and Biathlon competitions were held at Les Saisies.

== Medal summary ==
=== Medal table ===
Rank	Nation	Gold	Silver	Bronze	Total
1	France	1	1	0	2
2	Japan	1	0	0	1
3	Norway	0	1	0	1
4	Austria	0	0	2	2
Totals (4 entries)		2	2	2	6

France and Japan, two nations that had never won a medal in Olympic Nordic combined, topped the medal table, each winning one gold, with the French adding a silver as well.

=== Events ===
Event	Gold		Silver		Bronze	
Individual	Fabrice Guy; France	44:28.1	Sylvain Guillaume; France	45:16.5	Klaus Sulzenbacher; Austria	45:34.4
Team	Japan; Reiichi Mikata; Takanori Kono; Kenji Ogiwara	1:23:36.5	Norway; Knut Tore Apeland; Fred Børre Lundberg; Trond Einar Elden	1:25:02.9	Austria; Klaus Ofner; Stefan Kreiner; Klaus Sulzenbacher	1:25:16.6

== Participating NOCs ==
Twelve nations participated in Nordic combined at the Albertville Games. Estonia made their Olympic Nordic combined debut, and the Unified Team made their only appearance.

- Austria (4)
- Estonia (4)
- Unified Team (4)
- Finland (4)
- France (4)
- Germany (4)
- Japan (4)
- Norway (4)
- Poland (2)
- Switzerland (4)
- Czechoslovakia (4)
- United States (4)
