= Andrey Dundukov =

Russian Nordic combined skier (born 1966)

Medal record

Men's Nordic combined

World Championships
Silver medal – second place	1989 Lahti	15 km individual
Bronze medal – third place	1987 Oberstdorf	3 x 10 km team

Andrey Dundukov (Russian: Андре́й Дундуко́в; born 12 November 1966) is a Soviet/Russian Nordic combined skier who competed from 1985 to 1992. He won two medals at the FIS Nordic World Ski Championships with silver in the 15 km individual (1989) and a bronze in the 3x10 km team (1987).

Dundukov finished 12th in the individual event at the 1988 Winter Olympics in Calgary. He won the Nordic combined event at the 1990 Holmenkollen ski festival and earned one additional career victory in 1986.
