= Hermann Weinbuch =

German skier

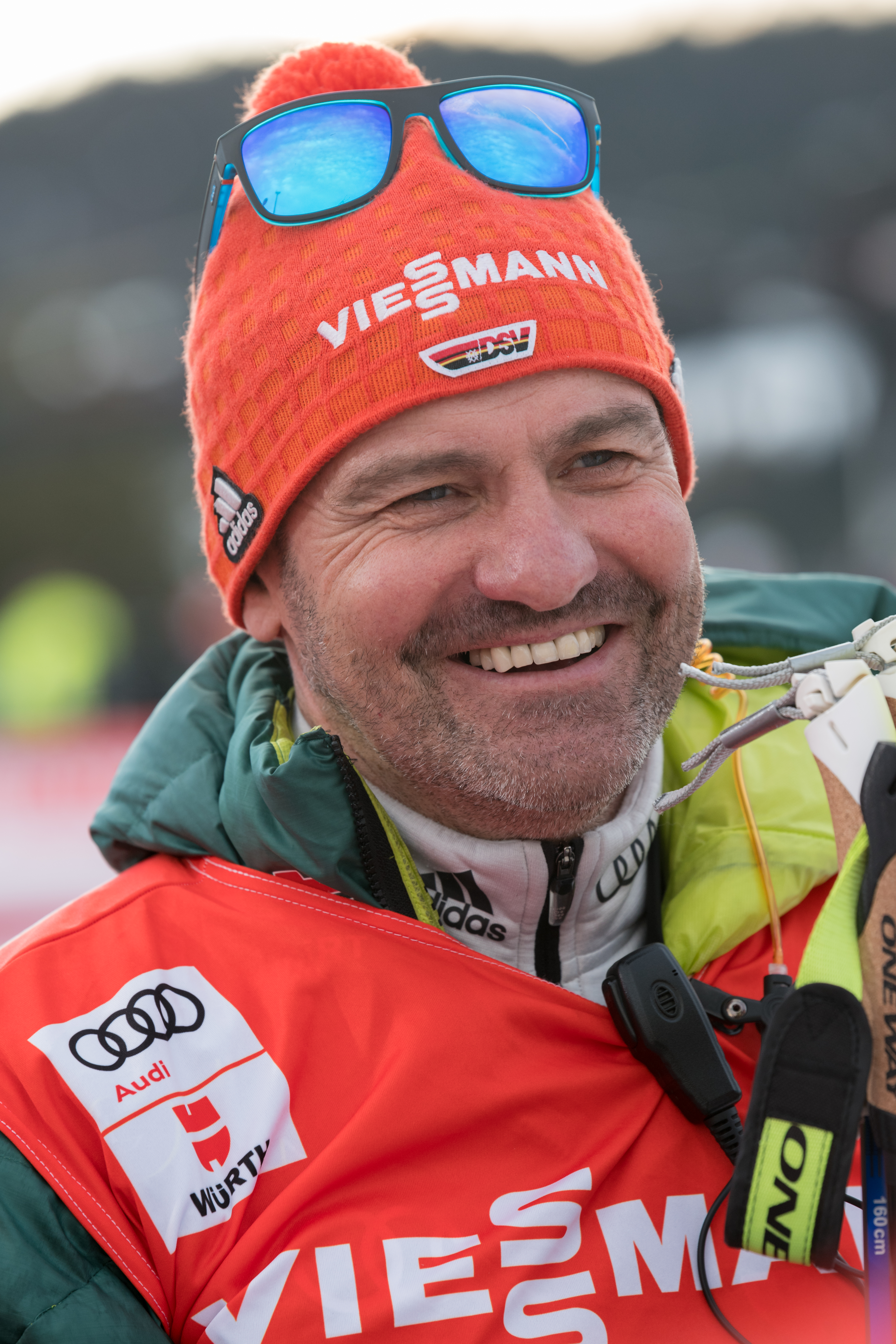

Medal record

Men's Nordic combined

Representing West Germany

World Championships
| Gold medal – first place | 1985 Seefeld | 15 km individual |
| Gold medal – first place | 1985 Seefeld | 3 x 10 km team |
| Gold medal – first place | 1987 Oberstdorf | 3 x 10 km team |
| Bronze medal – third place | 1987 Oberstdorf | 15 km individual |

Hermann Weinbuch (born 22 March 1960 in Bischofswiesen, Bavaria, West Germany) is a former West German Nordic combined skier who won four medals at the FIS Nordic World Ski Championships during the 1980s. In 1985, he won the 15 km individual and 3 x 10 km team gold medals, then followed it up two years later with two more medals (gold: 3 x 10 km, bronze: 15 km individual).

Weinbuch also competed at the 1984 Winter Olympics in Sarajevo in the Nordic combined event, finishing 8th.

He also competed at the Holmenkollen ski festival, winning the Nordic combined event twice (1985, 1987). Weinbuch was awarded the Holmenkollen medal in 1987 (Shared with Matti Nykänen.).

At the 2006 Winter Olympics in Turin, he was a trainer on the German national Nordic combined team that would win a complete set of medals (Georg Hettich - individual gold, sprint bronze; team silver).
