= Geir Andersen =

Norwegian Nordic combined skier

Medal record

Men's Nordic combined

Representing Norway

World Championships
Gold medal – first place	1984 Rovaniemi	3 x 10 km team
Silver medal – second place	1985 Seefeld	15 km individual
Silver medal – second place	1985 Seefeld	3 x 10 km team

Geir Andersen (born February 12, 1964) is a Norwegian Nordic combined skier who competed from 1983 to 1989. He won three medals at the FIS Nordic World Ski Championships with one gold (1984: 3 x 10 km team) and two silvers (1985: 15 km individual, 3 x 10 km team).

Andersen also finished 10th in the individual event at the 1984 Winter Olympics in Sarajevo. He had six individual victories in his career from 1984 to 1985.
