= Andreas Schaad =

Swiss Nordic combined skier (born 1965)

Medal record

Men's Nordic combined

Olympic Games
Silver medal – second place	1988 Calgary	3 x 10 km team
Bronze medal – third place	1994 Lillehammer	3 x 10 km team

World Championships
Silver medal – second place	1989 Lahti	3 x 10 km team

Andreas Schaad (born 18 April 1965) is a former Swiss Nordic combined skier who competed during the late 1980s and early 1990s. He won two medals in the 3 x 10 km team event at the Winter Olympics with a silver in 1988 and a bronze in 1994. He also won a silver medal in the 3 x 10 km team event at the 1989 FIS Nordic World Ski Championships in Lahti.
