= Olympiaschanze =

Swiss Olympic ski jump

Coordinates: 46.475182°N 9.824156°E

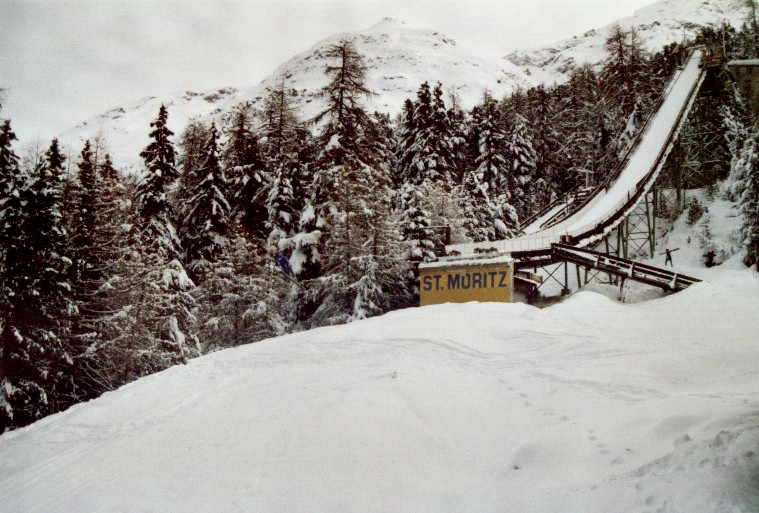
Olympiaschanze in 2002

Olympiaschanze was a ski jumping venue in St. Moritz, Switzerland, it was built in 1926 and closed in 2006. The ski jumping and the ski jumping part of the Nordic combined event for the 1928 Winter Olympics.

Its K-point was 66 m.
