= Takanori Kono =

Japanese Nordic combined skier (born 1969)

Takanori Kōno 河野 孝典
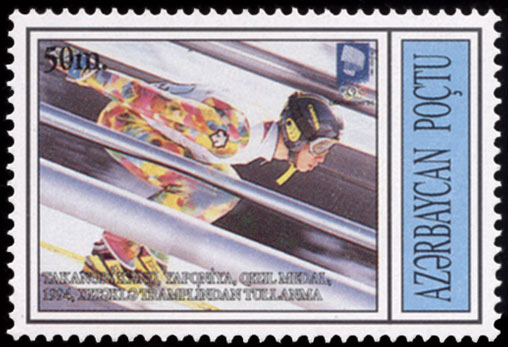
- Takanori Kono stamp of Azerbaijan

Personal information
- Nationality: Japan
- Born: 7 March 1969 (age 57) Nozawaonsen, Nagano, Japan

Sport
- Sport: Skiing
Medal record
Men's Nordic combined
Representing Japan
Olympic Games
Gold medal – first place	1992 Albertville	3 x 10 km team
Gold medal – first place	1994 Lillehammer	3 x 10 km team
Silver medal – second place	1994 Lillehammer	15 km individual
World Championships
Gold medal – first place	1993 Falun	3 x 10 km team
Gold medal – first place	1995 Thunder Bay	4 x 5 km team

Takanori Kono (河野 孝典, Kōno Takanori) (born March 7, 1969) is a former Japanese Nordic combined skier who competed during the 1990s, winning at the FIS Nordic World Ski Championships, the Winter Olympics, and the Holmenkollen ski festival.

Kono won three medals at the Winter Olympics, including two golds (3 x 10 km team: 1992, 1994) and a silver (15 km individual: 1994). He also won two gold medals in the team event at the world championships (3 x 10 km: 1993, 4 x 5 km: 1995).

Kono also won the Nordic combined event at the Holmenkollen ski festival in 1993, becoming the first Asian to win at the prestigious event.

Kono was Deputy Vice Mayor of the Athletes Village at the 1998 Winter Olympics.

He is now coach for the Japanese Nordic combined team, a role he has had since 2006.
