= Bjarte Engen Vik =

Norwegian former Nordic combined athlete (born 1971)

Personal information
- Nationality: Norway
- Born: 3 March 1971 (age 55) Tromsø, Norway
- Height: 1.73 m (5 ft 8 in)

Sport
- Sport: Skiing
- Club: Bardufoss IF

World Cup career
- Seasons: 1991–2001
- Indiv. starts: 102
- Indiv. podiums: 61
- Indiv. wins: 26
- Overall titles: 2 (1998, 1999)
Medal record
Men's Nordic combined
Representing Norway
Olympic Games
Gold medal – first place	1998 Nagano	15 km individual
Gold medal – first place	1998 Nagano	4 x 5 km team
Silver medal – second place	1994 Lillehammer	3 x 10 km team
Bronze medal – third place	1994 Lillehammer	15 km individual
World Championships
Gold medal – first place	1997 Trondheim	4 x 5 km team
Gold medal – first place	1999 Ramsau	7.5 km sprint
Gold medal – first place	1999 Ramsau	15 km individual
Gold medal – first place	2001 Lahti	15 km individual
Gold medal – first place	2001 Lahti	4 x 5 km team
Silver medal – second place	1995 Thunder Bay	4 x 5 km team
Silver medal – second place	1997 Trondheim	15 km individual
Silver medal – second place	1999 Ramsau	4 x 5 km team

Bjarte Engen Vik (born 3 March 1971 in Tromsø) is a Norwegian former Nordic combined athlete. He won the FIS World Cup overall twice, in 1997–98 and 1998–99 with a total of 24 wins. He also has eight medals from the FIS Nordic World Ski Championships with five golds (1997: 4 x 5 km team, 1999: 15 km individual, 7.5 km sprint, 2001: 15 km individual, 4 x 5 km team), and three silvers (1995: 4 x 5 km team, 1997: 15 km individual, 1999: 4 x 5 km team). He also won a bronze medal in the Norwegian championship in ski jumping. His consecutive wins in the Individual Gundersen at the Nordic Skiing World Championships in 1999 and 2001 were the first since Oddbjørn Hagen did it in 1934 and 1935.

Vik also found great success at the Holmenkollen ski festival, winning the Nordic combined individual event five times (1996–2000), becoming one of only four athletes to do so (Lauritz Bergendahl, Johan Grøttumsbråten, and Rauno Miettinen are the others.). He also won the Nordic combined 7.5 km sprint event at the festival twice (1997, 2000). Vik's seven career wins at the Holmenkollen are the most among any competitor in Nordic combined.

Vik received the Holmenkollen medal in 1997 (shared with Stefania Belmondo and Bjørn Dæhlie).
