= Kenji Ogiwara =

Japanese Nordic combined skier

- 荻原 健司

Mayor of Nagano
- Incumbent
- Assumed office 11 November 2021
- Preceded by: Hisao Katō

Member of the House of Councillors
- In office 26 July 2004 – 25 July 2010
- Constituency: National PR

Personal details
- Born: 20 December 1969 (age 56) Kusatsu, Gunma, Japan
- Party: Liberal Democratic
- Education: Waseda University
- Sports career
- Sport: Skiing
Medal record
Men's Nordic combined
Representing Japan
Olympic Games
Gold medal – first place	1992 Albertville	3 x 10 km team
Gold medal – first place	1994 Lillehammer	3 x 10 km team
World Championships
Gold medal – first place	1993 Falun	15 km individual
Gold medal – first place	1993 Falun	3 x 10 km team
Gold medal – first place	1995 Thunder Bay	4 x 5 km team
Gold medal – first place	1997 Trondheim	15 km individual
Bronze medal – third place	1999 Ramsau	7.5 km sprint

Kenji Ogiwara (荻原 健司, Ogiwara Kenji; born 20 December 1969) is a Japanese politician and former Nordic combined skier who won several medals at the Winter Olympics, the FIS Nordic World Ski Championships, and the Holmenkollen ski festival.

He won gold medals in the Nordic combined team events at the 1992 and 1994 Winter Olympics. Ogiwara won two gold medals each in the 15 km individual (1993, 1997) and the team (3 x 10 km: 1993, 4 x 5 km: 1995) events and one bronze in the 7.5 km sprint (1999) at the Nordic skiing world championships. In 1995, Ogiwara won the Nordic combined event at the Holmenkollen ski festival.

Ogiwara received the Holmenkollen medal in 1995, becoming the first non-European and first Asian to ever receive the honor. At the 1998 Winter Olympics, he took the Athlete's Oath.

Ogiwara's twin brother Tsugiharu competed with him at the 1995 FIS Nordic World Ski Championships in Thunder Bay, Ontario, sharing a gold with him in the 4 x 5 km team event.

Ogiwara has also stood as candidate for Liberal Democratic Party. He ran for the Mayor of Nagano election, which was executed on October 31, 2021, won 98,711 votes, and was appointed Mayor of Nagano on November 11, 2021.

== Filmography ==
- 11 Rebels (2024)
