= Klaus Sulzenbacher =

Austrian Nordic combined skier

Medal record

Men's Nordic combined

Representing Austria

Olympic Games
Silver medal – second place	1988 Calgary	15 km individual
Bronze medal – third place	1988 Calgary	3 x 10 km team
Bronze medal – third place	1992 Albertville	15 km individual
Bronze medal – third place	1992 Albertville	3 x 10 km team

World Championships
Gold medal – first place	1991 Val di Fiemme	3 x 10 km team
Silver medal – second place	1991 Val di Fiemme	15 km individual

Klaus Sulzenbacher (born 3 February 1965 in Kitzbühel, Austria) is a former Nordic combined skier.

Between 1983 and 1991 he won 14 World Cup competitions, and also won the World Cup twice. At the 1988 Winter Olympics in Calgary, he won silver in the 15 km individual competition, and bronze in the 3 x 10 km team competition. At the 1991 FIS Nordic World Ski Championships he finished second in the 15 km individual competition, and won in the 3 x 10 km team event. At the 1992 Winter Olympics in Albertville, he won bronze medals in both the 15 km individual and 3 x 10 km team competitions.

Sulzenbacher grew up in Kitzbühel, Tyrol, which is often considered Austria's mecca of Alpine skiing. That he went to train in Nordic skiing in his youth, and not in Alpine styles, is remarkable given that at the time virtually the entire well-funded Austrian Ski Federation system was geared towards Alpine ski racing. Sulzenbacher must be credited for breaking new ground. As Austria's first successful Nordic skier, Sulzenbacher is regarded as cornerstone for the successes of both Mario Stecher and Felix Gottwald. With four Olympic medals, he is among Austria's most successful Olympic competitors. Following his retirement from competition, he now works as a physiotherapist in Stams.
