= Fabrice Guy =

French Nordic combined skier (born 1968)

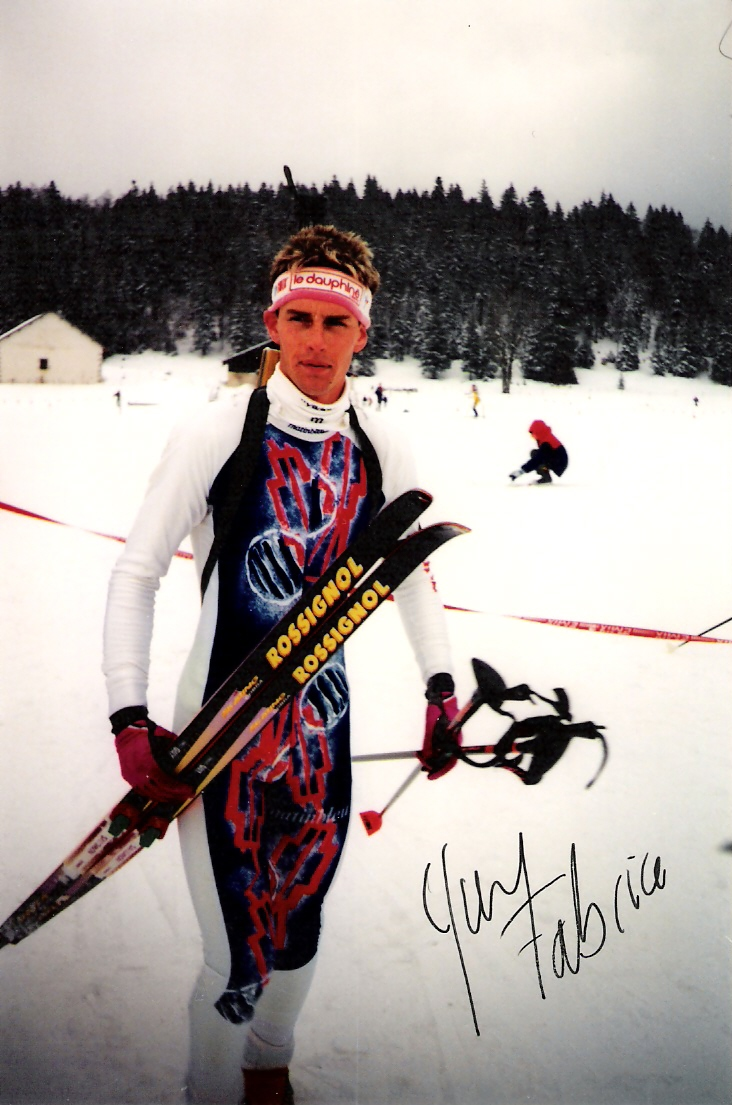
- Fabrice Guy

Medal record

Men's Nordic combined

Representing France

Olympic Games
Gold medal – first place	1992 Albertville	15 km individual
Bronze medal – third place	1998 Nagano	4 x 5 km team

World Championships
Silver medal – second place	1991 Val di Fiemme	3 x 10 km team
Bronze medal – third place	1997 Trondheim	15 km individual

Fabrice Guy (born 30 December 1968) is a former French Nordic combined skier from Pontarlier, Doubs, who competed during the 1990s. At the 1992 Winter Olympics in Albertville he won gold in the 15 km individual, then won a bronze in the 4 x 5 km team competition at the 1998 Winter Olympics in Nagano. He also has two medals from the FIS Nordic World Ski Championships with a silver medal in the 3 x 10 km team event in 1991 and a bronze medal in the 15 km individual event in 1997.

Guy also won the Nordic combined event at the 1992 Holmenkollen ski festival.
