= Fred Børre Lundberg =

Norwegian Nordic combined skier

Medal record

Men's Nordic combined

Representing Norway

Olympic Games
Gold medal – first place	1994 Lillehammer	15 km individual
Gold medal – first place	1998 Nagano	4 x 5 km team
Silver medal – second place	1992 Albertville	3 x 10 km team
Silver medal – second place	1994 Lillehammer	3 x 10 km team

World Championships
Gold medal – first place	1991 Val di Fiemme	15 km individual
Gold medal – first place	1995 Thunder Bay	15 km individual
Gold medal – first place	1997 Trondheim	4 x 5 km team
Silver medal – second place	1993 Falun	3 x 10 km team
Silver medal – second place	1995 Thunder Bay	4 x 5 km team
Silver medal – second place	1999 Ramsau	4 x 5 km team

Fred Børre Lundberg (born 25 December 1969 in Hammerfest and raised in Bardufoss) is a former Nordic combined skier from Bardu Municipality, Norway. He dominated the sport in the 1990s, winning both at the FIS Nordic World Ski Championships and at the Winter Olympics.

Lundberg won six medals at the Nordic skiing world championships, including three golds (15 km individual: 1991, 1995; 4 x 5 km team: 1997) and three silvers (3 x 10 km team: 1993, 4 x 5 km team: 1995, and 1999). At the Winter Olympics, he won four medals, including two golds (15 km individual: 1994, 4 x 5 km team 1998) and two silvers (3 x 10 km team: 1992, 1994).

He won the Holmenkollen medal in 1998 (shared with Larissa Lazutina, Alexey Prokurorov, and Harri Kirvesniemi).

Lundberg lives with Marit Bjørgen, an Olympic champion in cross-country skiing, in Holmenkollen, Oslo.
