= Knut Tore Apeland =

Norwegian Nordic combined skier

Medal record

Men's Nordic combined

Olympic Games
Silver medal – second place	1992 Albertville	3 x 10 km team
Silver medal – second place	1994 Lillehammer	3 x 10 km team

World Championships
Gold medal – first place	1997 Trondheim	4 x 5 km team
Silver medal – second place	1993 Falun	Individual
Silver medal – second place	1993 Falun	3 x 10 km team
Silver medal – second place	1995 Thunder Bay	4 x 5 km team

Knut Tore Apeland (born 11 December 1968 in Vinje Municipality) is a former Norwegian Nordic combined skier who competed during the 1990s, winning at the FIS Nordic World Ski Championships, and the Winter Olympics in the team events.

Apeland won two medals at the Winter Olympics, both silvers in the 3 x 10 km team event (1992, 1994) and four medals at the Nordic skiing world championships (one individual and three in the team event).
