= Trond Einar Elden =

Norwegian skier

Personal information
- Nationality: Norway
- Born: 21 February 1970 (age 56)
- Height: 189 cm (6 ft 2 in)

Sport
- Sport: Skiing

World Cup career
- Seasons: 1988-2005
- Indiv. starts: 88
- Indiv. wins: 5
Medal record
Men's Nordic combined
Representing Norway
Olympic Games
Silver medal – second place	1992 Albertville	3 × 10 km team
World Championships
Gold medal – first place	1989 Lahti	15 km individual
Gold medal – first place	1989 Lahti	3 × 10 km team
Silver medal – second place	1993 Falun	3 × 10 km team
Silver medal – second place	1999 Ramsau	4 × 5 km team
Bronze medal – third place	1993 Falun	15 km individual

Trond Einar Elden (born 21 February 1970) is a Norwegian former Nordic combined skier who represented Namdalseid IL. He competed at three Winter Olympics.

At the 1989 FIS Nordic World Ski Championships in Lahti, he became the youngest world champion ever, fifteen days after his nineteenth birthday. At Falun in 1993, he won a bronze medal in the 15 km individual event. Additionally, Elden won two medals in the 3 × 10 km team event at the Nordic skiing world championships with a gold in 1989 and a silver in 1993. Elden also won the Nordic combined event twice at the Holmenkollen ski festival (1989, 1991).

In 1991, Elden received the Holmenkollen medal (which he shared with Vegard Ulvang, Ernst Vettori, and Jens Weißflog). He would also win silver in the 3 × 10 km team event at the 1992 Winter Olympics in Albertville.

Elden was relatively strong in cross-country skiing as well, spending his final years of competition as a ski sprinter. He later coached the American national skiing team. Elden received the Egebergs Ærespris in 2004. He is the brother of the Nordic combined skier Bård Jørgen Elden.

== Nordic combined wins in World Cup ==
No.	Date	Place	Discipline
1.	3 March 1989	Oslo, Norway	Gundersen K120 / 15,0 km
2.	11 March 1989	Falun, Sweden	Gundersen K90 / 15,0 km
3.	2 March 1991	Lahti, Finland	Gundersen K90 / 15,0 km
4.	8 March 1991	Falun, Sweden	Gundersen K90 / 15,0 km
5.	15 March 1991	Oslo, Norway	Gundersen K120 / 15,0 km

== Cross-country skiing results ==
All results are sourced from the International Ski Federation (FIS).

=== Olympic Games ===
Year	Age	15 km	Pursuit	30 km	50 km	Sprint	4 × 10 km relay
2002	32	—	—	—	—	15	—

=== World Championships ===
Year	Age	15 km	Pursuit	30 km	50 km	Sprint	4 × 10 km relay
2003	33	—	—	—	—	24	—

=== World Cup ===
==== Season standings ====
Season	Age			
Season	Age	Overall	Distance	Sprint
2001	31	27	—N/a	5
2002	32	35	—N/a	11
2003	33	43	—N/a	18
2004	34	49	NC	17

==== Individual podiums ====
- 2 podiums

No.	Season	Date	Location	Race	Level	Place
1	2000–01	4 February 2001	Nové Město, Czech Republic	1.0 km Sprint F	World Cup	2nd
2	2001–02	29 December 2001	Salzburg, Austria	1.5 km Sprint C	World Cup	2nd

Awards
Preceded by Hilde Gjermundshaug Pedersen	Egebergs Ærespris; 2004	Succeeded by Stein Johnson
