= Nordic combined at the 1994 Winter Olympics – Individual =

Individual at the XVII Olympic Winter Games
- Pictogram for Nordic combined
- Venue: Lysgårdsbakken (ski jumping); Birkebeineren Ski Stadium (cross-country skiing)
- Dates: 18–19 February 1994
- Competitors: 53 from 16 nations
- Winning time: 39:07.9

Medalists
1st place, gold medalist(s)		Fred Børre Lundberg	Norway
2nd place, silver medalist(s)		Takanori Kono	Japan
3rd place, bronze medalist(s)		Bjarte Engen Vik	Norway

The men's individual Nordic combined competition for the 1994 Winter Olympics in Lillehammer at Lysgårdsbakken and Birkebeineren Ski Stadium on 18 and 19 February.

== Results ==
=== Ski Jumping ===
Athletes did two normal hill ski jumps. The combined points earned on the jumps determined the starting order and times for the cross-country race; each point was equal to a 4-second deficit.

Rank	Name	Country	Jump 1	Jump 2	Total	Time Difference
1	Fred Børre Lundberg	Norway	124.5	122.5	247.0	+0:00
2	Ago Markvardt	Estonia	123.0	120.5	243.5	+0:24
3	Bjarte Engen Vik	Norway	120.0	120.5	240.5	+0:43
4	Takanori Kono	Japan	119.0	120.5	239.5	+0:50
5	Todd Lodwick	United States	119.5	112.5	232.0	+1:40
6	Kenji Ogiwara	Japan	116.5	114.5	231.0	+1:47
7	Jean-Yves Cuendet	Switzerland	114.0	108.0	222.0	+2:47
8	Junichi Kogawa	Japan	96.0	124.5	220.5	+2:57
9	Hippolyt Kempf	Switzerland	104.5	112.0	216.5	+3:23
10	Jari Mantila	Finland	104.5	109.0	213.5	+3:43
11	Mario Stecher	Austria	99.0	112.0	211.0	+4:00
12	Roland Braun	Germany	113.5	95.5	209.0	+4:13
13	Dmytro Prosvirnin	Ukraine	103.0	105.5	208.5	+4:17
14	Masashi Abe	Japan	110.0	97.0	207.0	+4:27
15	Knut Tore Apeland	Norway	102.5	102.0	204.5	+4:43
16	Sylvain Guillaume	France	97.5	104.5	202.0	+5:00
17	Trond Einar Elden	Norway	98.5	103.0	201.5	+5:03
18	František Máka	Czech Republic	99.5	102.0	201.5	+5:03
19	Stanisław Ustupski	Poland	107.0	93.0	200.0	+5:13
20	Andreas Schaad	Switzerland	95.5	102.5	198.0	+5:27
21	Allar Levandi	Estonia	101.0	96.5	197.5	+5:30
22	Thomas Dufter	Germany	108.0	89.5	197.5	+5:30
23	Hannu Manninen	Finland	95.5	101.5	197.0	+5:33
24	Milan Kučera	Czech Republic	102.5	91.5	194.0	+5:53
25	Thomas Abratis	Germany	99.0	95.0	194.0	+5:53
26	Georg Riedlsperger	Austria	90.0	103.0	193.0	+6:00
27	Andrea Cecon	Italy	103.0	89.5	192.5	+6:03
28	Étienne Gouy	France	98.5	93.5	192.0	+6:07
29	Topi Sarparanta	Finland	95.0	97.0	192.0	+6:07
30	Ryan Heckman	United States	102.5	89.0	191.5	+6:10
31	Fabrice Guy	France	105.0	86.0	191.0	+6:13
32	Felix Gottwald	Austria	101.5	89.0	190.5	+6:17
33	Robert Stadelmann	Austria	102.0	88.5	190.5	+6:17
34	Tapio Nurmela	Finland	95.5	91.5	187.0	+6:40
35	Tim Tetreault	United States	99.5	87.0	186.5	+6:43
36	Michal Giacko	Slovakia	100.5	83.5	184.0	+7:00
37	Magnar Freimuth	Estonia	93.5	90.0	183.5	+7:03
38	Valery Kobelev	Russia	92.5	87.5	180.0	+7:26
39	Dave Jarrett	United States	90.5	85.0	175.5	+7:56
40	Valery Stolyarov	Russia	93.0	81.5	174.5	+8:03
41	Stéphane Michon	France	88.5	82.5	171.0	+8:26
42	Zbyněk Pánek	Czech Republic	89.5	81.5	171.0	+8:26
43	Andrea Longo	Italy	83.5	86.0	169.5	+8:36
44	Falk Schwaar	Germany	82.0	86.5	168.5	+8:43
45	Simone Pinzani	Italy	87.0	81.0	168.0	+8:46
46	Markus Wüst	Switzerland	71.0	96.6	167.6	+8:49
47	Ilmar Aluvee	Estonia	81.5	85.5	167.0	+8:53
48	Miroslav Kopal	Czech Republic	80.0	85.0	165.0	+9:06
49	Stanislav Dubrovsky	Russia	81.5	80.5	162.0	+9:26
50	Sergey Zakharenko	Belarus	75.5	71.0	146.5	+11:09
51	Martin Bayer	Slovakia	73.0	69.5	142.5	+11:36
52	Jozef Bachleda	Slovakia	73.0	67.5	140.5	+11:49
53	Dmitry Dubrovsky	Russia	67.5	71.5	139.0	+11:59

=== Cross-Country ===
The cross-country race was over a distance of 15 kilometres.

Rank	Name	Country	Start time	Cross-country		Finish time
Rank	Name	Country	Start time	Time	Place	Finish time
1st place, gold medalist(s)	Fred Børre Lundberg	Norway	+0:00	39:07.9	8	39:07.9
2nd place, silver medalist(s)	Takanori Kono	Japan	+0:50	39:35.4	13	40:25.4
3rd place, bronze medalist(s)	Bjarte Engen Vik	Norway	+0:43	39:43.2	15	40:26.2
4	Kenji Ogiwara	Japan	+1:47	39:30.7	11	41:17.7
5	Ago Markvardt	Estonia	+0:24	41:26.8	35	41:50.8
6	Hippolyt Kempf	Switzerland	+3:23	39:30.2	10	42:53.2
7	Jean-Yves Cuendet	Switzerland	+2:47	40:17.5	20	43:04.5
8	Trond Einar Elden	Norway	+5:03	38:07.7	1	43:10.7
9	Sylvain Guillaume	France	+5:00	38:18.4	2	43:18.4
10	Masashi Abe	Japan	+4:27	38:55.7	4	43:22.7
11	Knut Tore Apeland	Norway	+4:43	39:16.6	9	43:59.6
12	Allar Levandi	Estonia	+5:30	38:50.9	3	44:20.9
13	Todd Lodwick	United States	+1:40	42:41.2	43	44:21.2
14	Jari Mantila	Finland	+3:43	41:13.6	31	44:56.6
15	Andreas Schaad	Switzerland	+5:27	39:38.1	14	45:05.1
16	Dmytro Prosvirnin	Ukraine	+4:17	40:48.8	25	45:05.8
17	Fabrice Guy	France	+6:13	39:07.2	7	45:20.2
18	František Máka	Czech Republic	+5:03	40:23.2	22	45:26.2
19	Junichi Kogawa	Japan	+2:57	42:37.8	42	45:34.8
20	Topi Sarparanta	Finland	+6:07	39:49.7	16	45:56.7
21	Stanisław Ustupski	Poland	+5:13	40:53.8	26	46:06.8
22	Thomas Abratis	Germany	+5:53	40:55.7	28	46:48.7
23	Thomas Dufter	Germany	+5:30	41:18.8	32	46:48.8
24	Magnar Freimuth	Estonia	+7:03	39:55.0	17	46:58.0
25	Tapio Nurmela	Finland	+6:40	40:19.8	21	46:59.8
26	Michal Giacko	Slovakia	+7:00	40:02.5	19	47:02.5
27	Mario Stecher	Austria	+4:00	43:09.2	47	47:09.2
28	Étienne Gouy	France	+6:07	41:08.5	30	47:15.5
29	Ryan Heckman	United States	+6:10	41:05.7	29	47:15.7
30	Tim Tetreault	United States	+6:43	40:34.0	24	47:17.0
31	Milan Kučera	Czech Republic	+5:53	41:29.5	36	47:22.5
32	Zbyněk Pánek	Czech Republic	+8:26	38:58.0	5	47:24.0
33	Andrea Cecon	Italy	+6:03	41:22.1	33	47:25.1
34	Stéphane Michon	France	+8:26	39:00.1	6	47:26.1
35	Roland Braun	Germany	+4:13	43:17.0	48	47:30.0
36	Dave Jarrett	United States	+7:56	39:34.4	12	47:30.4
37	Felix Gottwald	Austria	+6:17	41:26.1	34	47:43.1
38	Hannu Manninen	Finland	+5:33	43:08.9	46	48:41.9
39	Ilmar Aluvee	Estonia	+8:53	39:56.8	18	48:49.8
40	Georg Riedlsperger	Austria	+6:00	43:00.2	44	49:00.2
41	Robert Stadelmann	Austria	+6:17	43:07.6	45	49:24.6
42	Falk Schwaar	Germany	+8:43	40:53.8	26	49:36.8
43	Valery Stolyarov	Russia	+8:03	41:51.2	37	49:54.2
44	Andrea Longo	Italy	+8:36	42:13.1	40	50:49.1
45	Stanislav Dubrovsky	Russia	+9:26	42:11.0	39	51:37.0
46	Markus Wüst	Switzerland	+8:49	43:36.7	49	52:25.7
47	Dmitry Dubrovsky	Russia	+11:59	40:27.6	23	52:26.6
48	Valery Kobelev	Russia	+7:26	45:46.5	52	53:12.5
49	Simone Pinzani	Italy	+8:46	44:40.7	50	53:26.7
50	Sergey Zakharenko	Belarus	+11:09	42:34.3	41	53:43.3
51	Jozef Bachleda	Slovakia	+11:49	41:54.4	38	53:43.4
52	Martin Bayer	Slovakia	+11:36	44:43.9	51	56:19.9
-	Miroslav Kopal	Czech Republic	+9:06	DNS	-	-
