= Nordic combined at the 1994 Winter Olympics – Team =

Team at the XVII Olympic Winter Games
- Venue: Lysgårdsbakken (ski jumping); Birkebeineren Ski Stadium (cross-country skiing)
- Dates: 23–24 February 1994
- Competitors: 36 from 12 nations
- Winning time: Team jump: 733.5; Ski time: 1:22:51.8; Final time: 1:22:51.8

Medalists
1st place, gold medalist(s)		Masashi Abe; Takanori Kono; Kenji Ogiwara	Japan
2nd place, silver medalist(s)		Bjarte Engen Vik; Knut Tore Apeland; Fred Børre Lundberg	Norway
3rd place, bronze medalist(s)		Jean-Yves Cuendet; Andreas Schaad; Hippolyt Kempf	Switzerland

The men's team Nordic combined competition for the 1994 Winter Olympics in Lillehammer was held at Lysgårdsbakken and Birkebeineren Ski Stadium on 23 and 24 February.

Japan's margin of victory, preceded by their four-minute margin of victory at the FIS Nordic World Ski Championships in Falun the previous year, would lead the FIS to change the Nordic combined team event from a 3 × 10 km relay to a 4 × 5 km relay later in 1994 that would become effective at the FIS Nordic World Ski Championships 1995 in Thunder Bay and at the 1998 Winter Olympics in Nagano.

== Results ==
=== Ski jumping ===
Each of the three team members performed a single jump that was judged in the same format as the Olympic ski jumping competition. The scores for all the jumps each team were combined and used to calculate their deficit in the cross-country skiing portion of the event. Each point difference between teams in the ski jumping portion in this event resulted in a five second difference in the cross country part of the event.

Rank	Team	Points	Time difference
1	Japan; Masashi Abe; Takanori Kono; Kenji Ogiwara	733.5; 233.0; 255.0; 245.5	+0:00
2	Norway; Bjarte Engen Vik; Knut Tore Apeland; Fred Børre Lundberg	672.0; 249.5; 215.0; 207.5	+5:07
3	Switzerland; Jean-Yves Cuendet; Andreas Schaad; Hippolyt Kempf	643.5; 240.5; 210.0; 193.0	+7:30
4	Estonia; Magnar Freimuth; Allar Levandi; Ago Markvardt	619.0; 193.5; 220.0; 205.5	+9:32
5	Austria; Felix Gottwald; Georg Riedlsperger; Mario Stecher	609.0; 193.5; 218.5; 197.0	+10:22
6	Czech Republic; Milan Kučera; Zbyněk Pánek; František Máka	603.5; 206.5; 210.5; 186.5	+10:50
7	United States; Dave Jarrett; Ryan Heckman; Todd Lodwick	602.0; 193.5; 187.5; 221.0	+10:57
8	Germany; Roland Braun; Thomas Abratis; Thomas Dufter	595.0; 223.0; 178.5; 193.5	+11:32
9	Finland; Tapio Nurmela; Topi Sarparanta; Jari Mantila	592.0; 200.5; 189.5; 202.0	+11:47
10	France; Stéphane Michon; Fabrice Guy; Sylvain Guillaume	557.5; 191.5; 173.0; 193.0	+14:39
11	Italy; Simone Pinzani; Andrea Longo; Andrea Cecon	544.5; 173.0; 179.5; 192.0	+15:44
12	Russia; Valery Kobelev; Stanislav Dubrovsky; Valery Stolyarov	503.0; 179.5; 158.5; 165.0	+19:12

=== Cross-country ===
Each member of the team completed a ten kilometre cross-country skiing leg.

Rank	Team	Start time	Cross-country		Finish time
Rank	Team	Start time	Time	Place	Finish time
1st place, gold medalist(s)	Japan; Takanori Kono; Masashi Abe; Kenji Ogiwara	+0:00	1:22:51.8; 27:55.2; 27:49.1; 27:07.5	5	1:22:51.8
2nd place, silver medalist(s)	Norway; Knut Tore Apeland; Bjarte Engen Vik; Fred Børre Lundberg	+5:07	1:22:33.9; 26:51.5; 28:28.8; 27:13.6	3	1:27:40.9
3rd place, bronze medalist(s)	Switzerland; Hippolyt Kempf; Jean-Yves Cuendet; Andreas Schaad	+7:30	1:23:09.9; 27:35.6; 28:02.0; 27:32.3	4	1:30:39.9
4	Estonia; Magnar Freimuth; Allar Levandi; Ago Markvardt	+9:32	1:23:35.4; 28:09.5; 27:05.4; 28:20.5	2	1:33:07.4
5	Czech Republic; Zbyněk Pánek; Milan Kučera; František Máka	+10:50	1:24:05.9; 27:23.4; 28:45.0; 27:57.5	6	1:34:55.9
6	France; Sylvain Guillaume; Stéphane Michon; Fabrice Guy	+14:39	1:20:53.0; 26:45.8; 27:09.8; 26:57.4	1	1:35:32.0
7	United States; Dave Jarrett; Todd Lodwick; Ryan Heckman	+10:57	1:25:10.4; 27:49.8; 29:03.2; 28:17.4	8	1:36:07.4
8	Finland; Topi Sarparanta; Jari Mantila; Tapio Nurmela	+11:47	1:24:32.4; 28:05.5; 28:44.7; 27:42.2	7	1:36:19.4
9	Austria; Georg Riedlsperger; Mario Stecher; Felix Gottwald	+10:22	1:27:47.5; 29:41.0; 29:17.4; 28:49.1	11	1:38:09.5
10	Germany; Thomas Dufter; Roland Braun; Thomas Abratis	+11:32	1:26:53.4; 28:40.7; 30:06.4; 28:06.3	10	1:38:25.4
11	Italy; Simone Pinzani; Andrea Longo; Andrea Cecon	+15:44	1:29:27.1; 31:29.6; 29:02.3; 28:55.2	12	1:45:11.1
12	Russia; Stanislav Dubrovsky; Valery Stolyarov; Valery Kobelev	+19:12	1:30:43.0; 29:11.2; 29:25.8; 32:06.0	9	1:49:55.0
