= Nordic combined at the 1998 Winter Olympics – Individual =

Individual at the XVIII Olympic Winter Games
- Pictogram for Nordic combined
- Venue: Hakuba Ski Jumping Stadium (ski jumping); Snow Harp (cross-country skiing)
- Dates: 13–14 February
- Competitors: 45 from 14 nations
- Winning time: 41:21.1

Medalists
| 1st place, gold medalist(s) | | Bjarte Engen Vik | Norway |
| 2nd place, silver medalist(s) | | Samppa Lajunen | Finland |
| 3rd place, bronze medalist(s) | | Valery Stolyarov | Russia |

The men's individual Nordic combined competition for the 1998 Winter Olympics in Nagano at Hakuba Ski Jumping Stadium and Snow Harp on 13 and 14 February.

== Results ==
=== Ski Jumping ===
Athletes completed two normal hill ski jumps. The combined points earned on the jumps determined the starting order and times for the cross-country race, with each point equivalent to a six-second deficit.

| Rank | Name | Country | Jump 1 | Jump 2 | Total | Time Difference |
|---|---|---|---|---|---|---|
| 1 | Bjarte Engen Vik | Norway | 116.0 | 125.0 | 241.0 | +0:00 |
| 2 | Valery Stolyarov | Russia | 120.0 | 115.0 | 235.0 | +0:36 |
| 3 | Tsugiharu Ogiwara | Japan | 112.5 | 120.0 | 232.5 | +0:51 |
| 4 | Junichi Kogawa | Japan | 112.0 | 120.0 | 232.0 | +0:54 |
| 5 | Christoph Bieler | Austria | 112.5 | 118.5 | 231.0 | +1:00 |
| 6 | Samppa Lajunen | Finland | 108.5 | 122.0 | 230.5 | +1:03 |
| 7 | Mario Stecher | Austria | 106.0 | 122.5 | 228.5 | +1:15 |
| 8 | Milan Kučera | Czech Republic | 110.5 | 117.5 | 228.0 | +1:18 |
| 9 | Kenji Ogiwara | Japan | 107.5 | 118.5 | 226.0 | +1:30 |
| 10 | Jens Deimel | Germany | 113.5 | 107.5 | 221.0 | +2:00 |
| 11 | Nicolas Bal | France | 110.0 | 108.5 | 218.5 | +2:15 |
| 12 | Jan Matura | Czech Republic | 104.5 | 113.5 | 218.0 | +2:18 |
| 13 | Todd Lodwick | United States | 101.0 | 116.0 | 217.0 | +2:24 |
| 14 | Tapio Nurmela | Finland | 110.5 | 103.0 | 213.5 | +2:45 |
| 15 | Dmitry Sinitsyn | Russia | 110.5 | 103.0 | 213.5 | +2:45 |
| 16 | Sylvain Guillaume | France | 108.0 | 104.5 | 212.5 | +2:51 |
| 17 | Jari Mantila | Finland | 101.0 | 111.0 | 212.0 | +2:54 |
| 18 | Ronny Ackermann | Germany | 103.5 | 106.0 | 209.5 | +3:09 |
| 19 | Bill Demong | United States | 110.5 | 98.0 | 208.5 | +3:15 |
| 20 | Hannu Manninen | Finland | 101.5 | 105.5 | 207.0 | +3:24 |
| 21 | Jean-Yves Cuendet | Switzerland | 105.5 | 100.5 | 206.0 | +3:30 |
| 22 | Fred Børre Lundberg | Norway | 101.5 | 103.5 | 205.0 | +3:36 |
| 23 | Ladislav Rygl | Czech Republic | 96.0 | 108.5 | 204.5 | +3:39 |
| 24 | Jens Salumäe | Estonia | 102.5 | 101.0 | 203.5 | +3:45 |
| 25 | Kristian Hammer | Norway | 105.5 | 98.0 | 203.5 | +3:45 |
| 26 | Josef Buchner | Germany | 99.5 | 103.5 | 203.0 | +3:48 |
| 27 | Ludovic Roux | France | 98.0 | 104.5 | 202.5 | +3:51 |
| 28 | Fabrice Guy | France | 98.0 | 103.5 | 201.5 | +3:57 |
| 29 | Christoph Eugen | Austria | 98.0 | 101.5 | 199.5 | +4:09 |
| 30 | Andrea Longo | Italy | 111.0 | 88.0 | 199.0 | +4:12 |
| 31 | Denis Tishagin | Russia | 98.0 | 100.5 | 198.5 | +4:15 |
| 32 | Urs Kunz | Switzerland | 102.0 | 94.0 | 196.0 | +4:30 |
| 33 | Aleksey Fadeyev | Russia | 107.5 | 88.0 | 195.5 | +4:33 |
| 34 | Petr Šmejc | Czech Republic | 103.0 | 92.0 | 195.0 | +4:36 |
| 35 | Dave Jarrett | United States | 105.5 | 89.5 | 195.0 | +4:36 |
| 36 | Satoshi Mori | Japan | 105.5 | 89.5 | 195.0 | +4:36 |
| 37 | Magnar Freimuth | Estonia | 95.5 | 99.0 | 194.5 | +4:39 |
| 38 | Andy Hartmann | Switzerland | 90.0 | 103.0 | 193.0 | +4:48 |
| 39 | Tim Tetreault | United States | 94.0 | 96.5 | 190.5 | +5:03 |
| 40 | Felix Gottwald | Austria | 98.5 | 91.5 | 190.0 | +5:06 |
| 41 | Matthias Looß | Germany | 83.0 | 104.0 | 187.0 | +5:24 |
| 42 | Halldor Skard | Norway | 75.5 | 110.5 | 186.0 | +5:30 |
| 43 | Marco Zarucchi | Switzerland | 99.0 | 86.5 | 185.5 | +5:33 |
| 44 | Ago Markvardt | Estonia | 77.5 | 104.0 | 181.5 | +5:57 |
| 45 | Konstantin Kalinovsky | Belarus | 85.5 | 95.5 | 181.0 | +6:00 |
| 46 | Roman Perko | Slovenia | 92.5 | 87.5 | 180.0 | +6:06 |
| 47 | Tambet Pikkor | Estonia | 77.0 | 88.5 | 165.5 | +7:33 |
| 48 | Sergey Zakharenko | Belarus | 73.0 | 85.0 | 158.0 | +8:18 |

=== Cross-Country ===
The cross-country race was over a distance of 15 kilometres.

| Rank | Name | Country | Start time | Cross-country | | Finish time |
| Rank | Name | Country | Start time | Time | Place | Finish time |
|---|---|---|---|---|---|---|
| 1st place, gold medalist(s) | Bjarte Engen Vik | Norway | +0:00 | 41:21.1 | 16 | 41:21.1 |
| 2nd place, silver medalist(s) | Samppa Lajunen | Finland | +1:03 | 40:45.6 | 8 | 41:48.6 |
| 3rd place, bronze medalist(s) | Valery Stolyarov | Russia | +0:36 | 41:13.3 | 14 | 41:49.3 |
| 4 | Kenji Ogiwara | Japan | +1:30 | 41:12.2 | 13 | 42:42.2 |
| 5 | Milan Kučera | Czech Republic | +1:18 | 41:27.8 | 17 | 42:45.8 |
| 6 | Tsugiharu Ogiwara | Japan | +0:51 | 41:55.4 | 23 | 42:46.4 |
| 7 | Nicolas Bal | France | +2:15 | 40:31.8 | 5 | 42:46.8 |
| 8 | Mario Stecher | Austria | +1:15 | 41:54.9 | 22 | 43:09.9 |
| 9 | Sylvain Guillaume | France | +2:51 | 40:51.5 | 9 | 43:42.5 |
| 10 | Dmitry Sinitsyn | Russia | +2:45 | 41:03.0 | 11 | 43:48.0 |
| 11 | Hannu Manninen | Finland | +3:24 | 40:27.0 | 4 | 43:51.0 |
| 12 | Ronny Ackermann | Germany | +3:09 | 40:43.9 | 7 | 43:52.9 |
| 13 | Jens Deimel | Germany | +2:00 | 41:56.3 | 24 | 43:56.3 |
| 14 | Ladislav Rygl | Czech Republic | +3:39 | 40:41.8 | 6 | 44:20.8 |
| 15 | Tapio Nurmela | Finland | +2:45 | 41:46.6 | 21 | 44:31.6 |
| 16 | Fred Børre Lundberg | Norway | +3:36 | 40:56.3 | 10 | 44:32.3 |
| 17 | Jean-Yves Cuendet | Switzerland | +3:30 | 41:04.6 | 12 | 44:34.6 |
| 18 | Urs Kunz | Switzerland | +4:30 | 40:23.2 | 3 | 44:53.2 |
| 19 | Christoph Bieler | Austria | +1:00 | 43:55.5 | 38 | 44:55.5 |
| 20 | Todd Lodwick | United States | +2:24 | 42:33.4 | 28 | 44:57.4 |
| 21 | Felix Gottwald | Austria | +5:06 | 40:10.2 | 2 | 45:16.2 |
| 22 | Andrea Longo | Italy | +4:12 | 41:14.2 | 15 | 45:26.2 |
| 23 | Junichi Kogawa | Japan | +0:54 | 44:42.8 | 42 | 45:36.8 |
| 24 | Christoph Eugen | Austria | +4:09 | 41:28.7 | 18 | 45:37.7 |
| 25 | Marco Zarucchi | Switzerland | +5:33 | 40:04.9 | 1 | 45:37.9 |
| 26 | Kristian Hammer | Norway | +3:45 | 42:22.7 | 26 | 46:07.7 |
| 27 | Jari Mantila | Finland | +2:54 | 43:16.6 | 34 | 46:10.6 |
| 28 | Andy Hartmann | Switzerland | +4:48 | 41:30.5 | 20 | 46:18.5 |
| 29 | Fabrice Guy | France | +3:57 | 42:46.3 | 30 | 46:43.3 |
| 30 | Dave Jarrett | United States | +4:36 | 42:16.0 | 25 | 46:52.0 |
| 31 | Ludovic Roux | France | +3:51 | 43:01.2 | 32 | 46:52.2 |
| 32 | Matthias Looß | Germany | +5:24 | 41:30.2 | 19 | 46:54.2 |
| 33 | Magnar Freimuth | Estonia | +4:39 | 42:29.5 | 27 | 47:08.5 |
| 34 | Bill Demong | United States | +3:15 | 44:03.9 | 40 | 47:18.9 |
| 35 | Jan Matura | Czech Republic | +2:18 | 45:17.0 | 44 | 47:35.0 |
| 36 | Tim Tetreault | United States | +5:03 | 42:45.5 | 29 | 47:48.5 |
| 37 | Aleksey Fadeyev | Russia | +4:33 | 43:46.7 | 36 | 48:19.7 |
| 38 | Satoshi Mori | Japan | +4:36 | 43:53.0 | 37 | 48:29.0 |
| 39 | Jens Salumäe | Estonia | +3:45 | 44:51.2 | 43 | 48:36.2 |
| 40 | Petr Šmejc | Czech Republic | +4:36 | 44:01.4 | 39 | 48:37.4 |
| 41 | Roman Perko | Slovenia | +6:06 | 43:01.4 | 33 | 49:07.4 |
| 42 | Konstantin Kalinovsky | Belarus | +6:00 | 43:38.2 | 35 | 49:38.2 |
| 43 | Sergey Zakharenko | Belarus | +8:18 | 42:54.2 | 31 | 51:12.2 |
| 44 | Tambet Pikkor | Estonia | +7:33 | 44:13.8 | 41 | 51:46.8 |
| - | Josef Buchner | Germany | +3:48 | DNS | - | - |
| - | Denis Tishagin | Russia | +4:15 | DNF | - | - |
| - | Halldor Skard | Norway | +5:30 | DNF | - | - |
| - | Ago Markvardt | Estonia | +5:57 | DNS | - | - |
