= Nordic combined at the 1998 Winter Olympics – Team =

Team at the XVIII Olympic Winter Games
- Venue: Hakuba Ski Jumping Stadium (ski jumping); Snow Harp (cross-country skiing)
- Dates: 19–20 February 1998
- Competitors: 44 from 11 nations
- Winning time: Team jump: 901.0; Ski time: 54:03.5; Final time: 54:11.5

Medalists
1st place, gold medalist(s)		Fred Børre Lundberg; Kenneth Braaten; Halldor Skard; Bjarte Engen Vik	Norway
2nd place, silver medalist(s)		Jari Mantila; Hannu Manninen; Tapio Nurmela; Samppa Lajunen	Finland
3rd place, bronze medalist(s)		Fabrice Guy; Nicolas Bal; Ludovic Roux; Sylvain Guillaume	France

The men's team Nordic combined competition for the 1998 Winter Olympics in Nagano was held at Hakuba Ski Jumping Stadium and Snow Harp on 19 and 20 February. For the first time, the Olympic team Nordic combined event featured a 4 × 5 kilometre relay race, rather than the 3 × 10 km used previously.

== Results ==
=== Ski jumping ===
Each of the four team members performed a single jump that was judged in the same format as the Olympic ski jumping competition. The scores for all the jumps each team were combined and used to calculate their deficit in the cross-country skiing portion of the event. Each point difference between teams in the ski jumping portion in this event resulted in a three second difference in the cross country part of the event.

Rank	Team	Points	Time difference
1	Finland; Jari Mantila; Hannu Manninen; Tapio Nurmela; Samppa Lajunen	906.0; 231.5; 229.0; 210.5; 235.0	+0:00
2	Austria; Mario Stecher; Christoph Bieler; Felix Gottwald; Christoph Eugen	903.5; 248.5; 223.0; 216.0; 216.0	+0:04
3	Norway; Fred Børre Lundberg; Kenneth Braaten; Halldor Skard; Bjarte Engen Vik	901.0; 219.5; 204.0; 222.5; 255.0	+0:08
4	Czech Republic; Marek Fiurášek; Ladislav Rygl; Jan Matura; Milan Kučera	900.5; 190.5; 227.0; 242.0; 241.0	+0:09
5	Japan; Satoshi Mori; Gen Tomii; Tsugiharu Ogiwara; Kenji Ogiwara	893.0; 223.5; 217.0; 229.5; 223.0	+0:21
6	France; Fabrice Guy; Nicolas Bal; Ludovic Roux; Sylvain Guillaume	863.0; 206.5; 212.0; 218.5; 226.0	+1:11
7	Germany; Jens Deimel; Matthias Looß; Thorsten Schmitt; Ronny Ackermann	861.0; 234.0; 208.0; 210.0; 209.0	+1:15
8	Russia; Aleksey Fadeyev; Vladimir Lysenin; Dmitry Sinitsyn; Valery Stolyarov	826.0; 205.5; 165.0; 224.5; 231.0	+2:13
9	United States; Bill Demong; Tim Tetreault; Dave Jarrett; Todd Lodwick	807.0; 175.5; 197.0; 205.0; 229.5	+2:45
10	Switzerland; Marco Zarucchi; Jean-Yves Cuendet; Urs Kunz; Andy Hartmann	797.0; 189.0; 193.5; 184.0; 230.5	+2:57
11	Estonia; Tambet Pikkor; Ago Markvardt; Jens Salumäe; Magnar Freimuth	749.5; 184.0; 176.0; 209.5; 180.0	+4:21

=== Cross-country ===
Each member of the team completed a five kilometre cross-country skiing leg.

Rank	Team	Start time	Cross-country		Finish time
Rank	Team	Start time	Time	Place	Finish time
1st place, gold medalist(s)	Norway; Halldor Skard; Kenneth Braaten; Bjarte Engen Vik; Fred Børre Lundberg	+0:08	54:03.5; 13:38.6; 13:29.1; 13:40.1; 13:15.7	2	54:11.5
2nd place, silver medalist(s)	Finland; Samppa Lajunen; Jari Mantila; Tapio Nurmela; Hannu Manninen	+0:00	55:30.4; 13:58.2; 14:21.4; 13:53.8; 13:17.0	5	55:30.4
3rd place, bronze medalist(s)	France; Sylvain Guillaume; Nicolas Bal; Ludovic Roux; Fabrice Guy	+1:11	54:42.4; 13:45.3; 13:30.4; 14:05.2; 13:21.5	3	55:53.4
4	Austria; Christoph Eugen; Christoph Bieler; Mario Stecher; Felix Gottwald	+0:04	56:00.6; 14:13.6; 14:51.9; 13:42.3; 13:12.8	8	56:04.6
5	Japan; Tsugiharu Ogiwara; Satoshi Mori; Gen Tomii; Kenji Ogiwara	+0:21	55:57.8; 13:55.6; 14:04.5; 14:46.9; 13:10.8	7	56:18.8
6	Germany; Matthias Looß; Ronny Ackermann; Thorsten Schmitt; Jens Deimel	+1:15	55:07.0; 14:24.3; 13:28.3; 13:44.7; 13:29.7	4	56:22.0
7	Switzerland; Marco Zarucchi; Andy Hartmann; Jean-Yves Cuendet; Urs Kunz	+2:57	53:40.6; 13:33.6; 13:33.3; 13:41.8; 12:51.9	1	56:37.6
8	Czech Republic; Marek Fiurášek; Milan Kučera; Jan Matura; Ladislav Rygl	+0:09	56:55.7; 14:50.5; 13:27.6; 15:19.3; 13:18.3	10	57:04.7
9	Russia; Vladimir Lysenin; Valery Stolyarov; Aleksey Fadeyev; Dmitry Sinitsyn	+2:13	56:21.2; 13:58.6; 14:19.9; 14:33.4; 13:29.3	9	58:34.2
10	United States; Dave Jarrett; Tim Tetreault; Bill Demong; Todd Lodwick	+2:45	55:53.6; 14:23.0; 14:07.0; 14:18.8; 13:04.8	6	58:38.6
11	Estonia; Ago Markvardt; Jens Salumäe; Tambet Pikkor; Magnar Freimuth	+4:21	59:11.9; 15:20.1; 15:03.5; 15:04.5; 13:43.8	11	63:32.9
