= 1991–92 FIS Nordic Combined World Cup =

International skiing competition

Nordic Combined World Cup 1991/92
Winners
- Overall: (France) Fabrice Guy
- Nations Cup: Norway

Competitions
- Venues: 8
- Individual: 8

The 1991/92 FIS Nordic Combined World Cup was the 9th world cup season, a combination of ski jumping and cross-country skiing organized by FIS. It started on 14 Dec 1991 in Štrbské Pleso, Czechoslovakia and ended on 13 March 1992 in Oslo, Norway.

== Calendar ==
=== Men ===
Num	Season	Date	Place	Hill	Discipline	Winner	Second	Third
64	1	14 December 1991	(Czechoslovakia) Štrbské Pleso	MS 1970 B	K90 / 15 km	(France) Fabrice Guy	(Norway) Fred Børre Lundberg	(Norway) Bård Jørgen Elden
65	2	21 December 1991	(France) Courchevel	Tremplin du Praz	K90 / 15 km	(France) Fabrice Guy	(Austria) Klaus Sulzenbacher	(Norway) Knut Tore Apeland
66	3	4 January 1992	(Germany) Schonach	Langenwaldschanze	K90 / 15 km	(France) Fabrice Guy	(Norway) Fred Børre Lundberg	(Austria) Klaus Sulzenbacher
67	4	11 January 1992	(Austria) Breitenwang	Raimund-Ertl-Schanze	K75 / 15 km	(Austria) Klaus Sulzenbacher	(Norway) Fred Børre Lundberg	(Czechoslovakia) Milan Kučera
68	5	18 January 1992	(Austria) Murau	Hans-Walland Großschanze	K120 / 15 km	(France) Fabrice Guy	(Austria) Klaus Sulzenbacher	(Austria) Klaus Ofner
1992 Winter Olympics
69	6	28 February 1992	(Finland) Lahti	Salpausselkä	K90 / 15 km	(Austria) Klaus Sulzenbacher	(Austria) Klaus Ofner	(Norway) Knut Tore Apeland
70	7	10 March 1992	(Norway) Trondheim	Granåsen	K120 / 15 km	(France) Fabrice Guy	(Norway) Trond Einar Elden	(Austria) Klaus Sulzenbacher
71	8	13 March 1992	(Norway) Oslo	Holmenkollbakken	K110 / 15 km	(France) Fabrice Guy	(Norway) Fred Børre Lundberg	(France) Sylvain Guillaume

== Standings ==
=== Overall ===
Rank		Points
1	(France) Fabrice Guy	170
2	(Austria) Klaus Sulzenbacher	128
3	(Norway) Fred Børre Lundberg	123
4	(Austria) Klaus Ofner	69
5	(Norway) Trond Einar Elden	50
6	(Norway) Knut Tore Apeland	43
7	(Norway) Frode Moen	42
7	(France) Sylvain Guillaume	42
9	(Switzerland) Andreas Schaad	35
9	(Czechoslovakia) František Maka	35

- Standings after 8 events.

=== Nations Cup ===
Rank		Points
1	Norway	349
2	Austria	294
3	France	259
4	Germany	160
5	Switzerland	101
6	Japan	82
7	Russia	66
8	Czechoslovakia	35
8	Poland	35
10	United States	33

- Standings after 8 events.
