= Nordic combined at the Winter Olympics =

- IOC Code: NCB
- Governing body: FIS
- Events: 3 (men)

Winter Olympics
- 1924; 1928; 1932; 1936; 1948; 1952; 1956; 1960; 1964; 1968; 1972; 1976; 1980; 1984; 1988; 1992; 1994; 1998; 2002; 2006; 2010; 2014; 2018; 2022; 2026
- Medalists

Nordic combined was contested at every edition of the Winter Olympic Games between 1924 and 2026. The first competition involved 18 km cross-country skiing, followed by ski jumping. It was dropped from the Olympic program for the 2030 Winter Olympics in the French Alps.

== Summary ==
Games	Year	Events	Best Nation
1	1924	1	Norway (1)
2	1928	1	Norway (2)
3	1932	1	Norway (3)
4	1936	1	Norway (4)
5	1948	1	Finland (1)
6	1952	1	Norway (5)
7	1956	1	Norway (6)
8	1960	1	United Team of Germany (1)
9	1964	1	Norway (7)
10	1968	1	West Germany (1)
11	1972	1	East Germany (1)
12	1976	1	East Germany (2)
13	1980	1	East Germany (3)

Games	Year	Events	Best Nation
14	1984	1	Norway (8)
15	1988	2	Switzerland (1)
16	1992	2	France (1)
17	1994	2	Norway (9)
18	1998	2	Norway (10)
19	2002	3	Finland (2)
20	2006	3	Austria (1)
21	2010	3	United States (1)
22	2014	3	Norway (11)
23	2018	3	Germany (1)
24	2022	3	Norway (12)
25	2026	3	Norway (13)

== History ==
As with the ski jumping competitions, it is disputed whether the Olympic Games from 1924 to 1956 were held as normal hill or large hill competitions. At that time, the same hill (and therefore the same hill size) was used for the ski jumping competition and the Nordic combined competition.

Whoever earned the most points from both competitions won the event. At the 1952 Winter Olympics, the ski jumping was held first, followed by 18 km cross-country skiing. The cross-country skiing portion was reduced to 15 km at the 1956 Winter Olympics. The ski jumping styles would change over the years as well, from the Kongsberger technique after World War I to the Daescher technique in the 1950s to the current V-style from 1985 onwards.

The cross-country skiing technique would switch from classical to freestyle for all competitions beginning in 1985. At the 1988 Winter Olympics the Gundersen method was adopted, meaning the 15 km cross country portion would go from an interval start race to a pursuit race, so that whoever crossed the finish line first won the event.

The team event with a 3 × 10 km cross country relay started at the 1988 Winter Olympics, changing to the current 4 × 5 km cross-country relay at the 1998 Winter Olympics. The 7.5 km sprint event was added at the 2002 Winter Olympics. For the 2010 Winter Olympics, the 15 km Individual Gundersen which consisted of 2 jumps followed by 15 km cross country was replaced by a 10 km individual normal hill event which consists of one jump from the individual normal hill following by 10 km of cross country using the Gundersen system, while the 7.5 km sprint was replaced by the 10 km individual large hill event.

Nordic combined was a men's only event for its entire Olympic tenure. The International Ski Federation decided in November 2016 to establish women's competitions by the 2022 Winter Olympics, and the first World Championship event for women was held in 2021. However, the IOC refused to add women's Nordic combined for the 2026 Winter Olympics. Nordic combined was removed entirely from the programme of the 2030 Winter Olympics, with the IOC citing a lack of popularity and limited number of participating nations.

== Events ==
Event	24	28	32	36	48	52	56	60	64	68	72	76	80	84	88	92	94	98	02	06	10	14	18	22	26	Years
18 km individual	•	•	•	•	•	•																				6
15 km individual							•	•	•	•	•	•	•	•	•	•	•	•	•	•						14
Team															•	•	•	•	•	•	•	•	•	•	•	11
10 km individual normal hill																					•	•	•	•	•	5
10 km individual large hill																					•	•	•	•	•	5
7.5 km sprint																			•	•						2
Total events	1	1	1	1	1	1	1	1	1	1	1	1	1	1	2	2	2	2	3	3	3	3	3	3	3	

== Medal table ==
Sources (after the 2022 Winter Olympics):
Accurate as of 2026 Winter Olympics.

Rank	Nation	Gold	Silver	Bronze	Total
1	Norway	18	12	8	38
2	Germany	6	6	4	16
3	Finland	4	9	4	17
4	Austria	3	4	12	19
5	East Germany	3	0	4	7
6	Japan	2	3	2	7
7	France	2	1	1	4
8	West Germany	2	1	0	3
9	United States	1	3	0	4
10	Switzerland	1	2	1	4
11	United Team of Germany	1	0	1	2
12	Soviet Union	0	1	2	3
13	Sweden	0	1	1	2
14	Italy	0	0	1	1
14	Poland	0	0	1	1
14	Russia	0	0	1	1
Totals (16 entries)		43	43	43	129

== Number of Nordic combined skiers by nation ==
Nation	24	28	32	36	48	52	56	60	64	68	72	76	80	84	88	92	94	98	02	06	10	14	18	22	26	Years
Australia								1																		1
Austria		1	3	4	4	4	3	1	4	3	1	1		1	4	4	4	4	5	4	5	5	5	5	3	23
Belarus																	1	2	1							3
Bulgaria					1																					1
Canada		2	4	4	1		1	2				1			1					2	1					10
China																								1	2	2
Czech Republic																	4	5	5	5	4	4	4	4	2	9
Czechoslovakia	4	4	4	4	4	1	3	1	3	2	4	2		2	4	4										15
East Germany										3	4	4	4	3	3											6
Estonia																4	4	4	2	1		3	2	1	2	9
Finland	2	2		4	4	4	3	4	4	3	3	4	4	3	4	4	4	4	5	5	5	4	5	5	3	24
France	4	3			2					3	1	1			4	4	4	4	4	4	5	5	5	5	3	17
Germany		5		4		2										4	4	5	6	5	5	5	5	5	3	13
Great Britain				1																						1
Hungary	3	1			2																					3
Italy		1	3	2	3	1	3	1	2	2	2	2					3	1		5	4	5	4	4	3	19
Japan		1	3	3		1	2	4	3	4	4	2	2	2	3	4	4	5	5	5	5	5	5	5	3	23
Kazakhstan																								1	1	2
Latvia				1																				1		1
Norway	4	4	4	4	4	4	4	4	4	4	4	4	4	4	4	4	4	5	5	4	5	5	5	5	3	25
Olympic Athletes from Russia																							1			1
Poland	2	3	3	4	4		4	1	1	4	3	4	4		1	2	1					1	4	2	2	19
Romania						1																				1
ROC																								3		1
Russia																	4	5	4	5	2	4				6
Slovakia																	3		1							2
Slovenia																		1	1	1	2	3	2	1	2	8
South Korea																							1	1		1
Soviet Union							4	4	3	4	4	3	3	4	4											9
Sweden	3	1	2	3	3	2	1	2			1															9
Switzerland	4	4	3	3	4	1			1	1		1	2	1	4	4	4	4	6	5	5	1	1			20
Ukraine																	1			2	1	1	1	1	2	7
Unified Team																4										1
United Team of Germany							4	4	4																	3
United States	4	3	4	4	4	4	4	4	3	4	4	3	4	3	4	4	4	4	4	6	5	4	5	5	2	25
West Germany										4	4	2	4	4	4											6
Yugoslavia				4	1						1			1												4
Nations	9	14	10	16	13	11	12	13	11	13	14	14	9	11	13	12	16	14	14	15	14	15	16	13	15	37
Nordic combined skiers	30	35	33	51	39	25	36	33	32	41	40	34	31	28	44	46	53	53	54	59	54	55	55	55	36	1052
Year	24	28	32	36	48	52	56	60	64	68	72	76	80	84	88	92	94	98	02	06	10	14	18	22	26	26

== See also ==
- List of Olympic venues in Nordic combined
