= 1997–98 FIS Nordic Combined World Cup =

International skiing competition

Nordic Combined World Cup 1997/98
Winners
- Overall: (Norway) Bjarte Engen Vik
- Nations Cup: Norway

Competitions
- Venues: 11
- Individual: 12

The 1997/98 FIS Nordic Combined World Cup was the 15th world cup season, a combination of ski jumping and cross-country skiing organized by FIS. It started on 28 Nov 1997 in Rovaniemi, Finland and ended on 14 March 1998 in Oslo, Norway.

== Calendar ==
=== Men ===
| Num | Season | Date | Place | Hill | Discipline | Winner | Second | Third |
|---|---|---|---|---|---|---|---|---|
| 124 | 1 | 28 November 1997 | (Finland) Rovaniemi | Ounasvaara | K90 / 7.5 km (Sprint) | (Finland) Samppa Lajunen | (Finland) Hannu Manninen | (Austria) Mario Stecher |
| 125 | 2 | 29 November 1997 | (Finland) Rovaniemi | Ounasvaara | K90 / 15 km | (Norway) Bjarte Engen Vik | (Austria) Mario Stecher | (Finland) Hannu Manninen |
| 126 | 3 | 11 December 1997 | (United States) Steamboat Springs | Howelsen Hill | K88 / 7.5 km (Sprint) | (Finland) Hannu Manninen | (Norway) Bjarte Engen Vik | (Austria) Mario Stecher |
| 127 | 4 | 13 December 1997 | (United States) Steamboat Springs | Howelsen Hill | K88 / 15 km | (Austria) Mario Stecher | (Norway) Bjarte Engen Vik | (United States) Todd Lodwick |
| 128 | 5 | 29 December 1997 | (Germany) Oberwiesenthal | Fichtelbergschanzen | K90 / 7.5 km (Sprint) | (Finland) Hannu Manninen | (Norway) Bjarte Engen Vik | (Switzerland) Urs Kunz |
| 129 | 6 | 3 January 1998 | (Germany) Schonach | Langenwaldschanze | K90 / 15 km | (United States) Todd Lodwick | (France) Sylvain Guillaume | (Czech Republic) Milan Kučera |
| 130 | 7 | 9 January 1998 | (Austria) Ramsau | W90-Mattensprunganlage | K90 / 15 km | (Norway) Bjarte Engen Vik | (Austria) Mario Stecher | (Austria) Felix Gottwald |
| 131 | 8 | 13 January 1998 | (Austria) Ramsau | W90-Mattensprunganlage | K90 / 7.5 km (Sprint) | (Norway) Kenneth Braaten | (Switzerland) Marco Zarucchi | (Switzerland) Urs Kunz |
| 132 | 9 | 18 January 1998 | (France) Chaux-Neuve | La Côté Feuillée | K90 / 15 km | (Czech Republic) Milan Kučera | (Austria) Felix Gottwald | (France) Ludovic Roux |
1998 Winter Olympics
| 133 | 10 | 28 February 1998 | (Japan) Sapporo | Miyanomori | K90 / 15 km | (Norway) Bjarte Engen Vik | (Austria) Mario Stecher | (Norway) Fred Børre Lundberg |
| 134 | 11 | 7 March 1998 | (Finland) Lahti | Salpausselkä | K90 / 15 km | (Norway) Bjarte Engen Vik | (Austria) Mario Stecher | (Norway) Fred Børre Lundberg |
| 135 | 12 | 10 March 1998 | (Sweden) Falun | Lugnet | K90 / 7.5 km (Sprint) | (Austria) Mario Stecher | (Norway) Bjarte Engen Vik | (Norway) Fred Børre Lundberg |
| 136 | 13 | 13 March 1998 | (Norway) Oslo | Holmenkollbakken | K112 / 7.5 km (Sprint) | (United States) Todd Lodwick | (France) Sylvain Guillaume | (Austria) Mario Stecher |
| 137 | 14 | 14 March 1998 | (Norway) Oslo | Holmenkollbakken | K112 / 15 km | (Norway) Bjarte Engen Vik | (Austria) Mario Stecher | (Norway) Kristian Hammer |

== Standings ==
=== Overall ===
| Rank | | Points |
|---|---|---|
| 1 | (Norway) Bjarte Engen Vik | 1468 |
| 2 | (Austria) Mario Stecher | 1440 |
| 3 | (Austria) Felix Gottwald | 854 |
| 4 | (United States) Todd Lodwick | 848 |
| 5 | (Finland) Hannu Manninen | 763 |
| 6 | (France) Sylvain Guillaume | 686 |
| 7 | (Norway) Fred Børre Lundberg | 678 |
| 8 | (Finland) Samppa Lajunen | 665 |
| 9 | (Austria) Christoph Eugen | 638 |
| 10 | (France) Ludovic Roux | 586 |

- Standings after 14 events.

=== Nations Cup ===
| Rank | | Points |
|---|---|---|
| 1 | Norway | 3669 |
| 2 | Austria | 3333 |
| 3 | Finland | 2428 |
| 4 | Germany | 1851 |
| 5 | France | 1693 |
| 6 | Japan | 1417 |
| 7 | United States | 1233 |
| 8 | Russia | 1190 |
| 9 | Switzerland | 1116 |
| 10 | Czech Republic | 1089 |

- Standings after 14 events.
