= List of Olympic venues in cross-country skiing =

For the Winter Olympics, there are 22 venues that have been or will be used for cross-country skiing. The first events took near the main stadium. In 1936, the first efforts to hold all of Nordic skiing (Nordic combined, ski jumping) in one location took place. This was repeated in 1952. For the 1956 games, the venue was among the first in the Winter Olympics to meet the television needs of RAI, Italy's national broadcaster. The 1956 venue was constructed in an oblong 250 by 44 m (820 by 144 ft) area in an east-west direction with the Grand Stands facing south. A temporary venue was created for the 1960 Games which also included biathlon for the first time. The first permanent Olympic venue in cross-country skiing took place in 1980. For all of Nordic skiing and biathlon, the first time they were in the same location was at the 2010 Games.

Games	Venue	Other sports hosted at venue for those games	Capacity	Ref.
1924 Chamonix	Stade Olympique de Chamonix	Curling, Figure skating, Ice hockey, Military patrol, Nordic combined (cross-country skiing), Speed skating	45,000.	
1928 St. Moritz	Around the hills of St. Moritz	Nordic combined (cross-country skiing)	Not listed.	
1932 Lake Placid	Lake Placid	Nordic combined (cross-country skiing)	Not listed.	
1936 Garmisch-Partenkirchen	Große Olympiaschanze	Nordic combined, Ski jumping	40,000	
1948 St. Moritz	Around the hills of St. Moritz	Nordic combined (cross-country skiing)	Not listed.	
1952 Oslo	Holmenkollen National Arena	Nordic combined, Ski jumping	150,000	
1956 Cortina d'Ampezzo	Lo Stadio della neve	Nordic combined (cross-country skiing)	9,650	
1960 Squaw Valley	McKinney Creek Stadium	Biathlon, Nordic combined (cross-country skiing)	1,000	
1964 Innsbruck	Seefeld	Biathlon, Nordic combined, Ski jumping (normal hill)	Not listed.	
1968 Grenoble	Autrans	Biathlon, Nordic combined, Ski jumping (normal hill)	40,000 (ski jump)	
1972 Sapporo	Makomanai Cross-country site	Nordic combined (cross-country skiing)	Not listed.	
1976 Innsbruck	Seefeld	Biathlon, Nordic combined, Ski jumping (normal hill)	Not listed.	
1980 Lake Placid	Lake Placid Olympic Sports Complex Cross Country Biathlon Center	Biathlon, Nordic combined (cross-country skiing)	Not listed.	
1984 Sarajevo	Igman, Veliko Polje	Biathlon, Nordic combined (cross-country skiing)	Not listed.	
1988 Calgary	Canmore Nordic Centre	Biathlon, Nordic combined (cross-country skiing)	Not listed.	
1992 Albertville	Les Saisies	Biathlon	12,500	
1994 Lillehammer	Birkebeineren Skistadion	Biathlon, Nordic combined (cross-country skiing)	31,000 (cross-country skiing); 13,500 (biathlon)	
1998 Nagano	Snow Harp	Nordic combined (cross-country skiing)	20,000	
2002 Salt Lake City	Soldier Hollow	Biathlon, Nordic combined (cross-country skiing)	15,200	
2006 Turin	Pragelato Plan	Nordic combined (cross-country skiing)	5,400	
2010 Vancouver	Whistler Olympic Park	Biathlon, Nordic combined, ski jumping	6,000	
2014 Sochi	Biathlon & Ski Complex	Biathlon, Nordic combined (cross-country skiing)	9,600 (biathlon); 9,600 (cross-country skiing)	
2018 Pyeongchang	Alpensia Cross-Country Skiing Centre	Nordic combined (cross-country skiing)	7,500 (including 3,000 standing)	
2022 Beijing	Zhangjiakou National Cross-Country Centre	Nordic combined (cross-country skiing)	Not listed.	
2026 Milan-Cortina	Cross country and biathlon center Fabio Canal	Nordic combined (cross-country skiing)	50,000 (max capacity)	
2030 French Alps	La Clusaz		TBD	
2034 Utah	Soldier Hollow	Biathlon	15,200	

== Gallery of venues ==
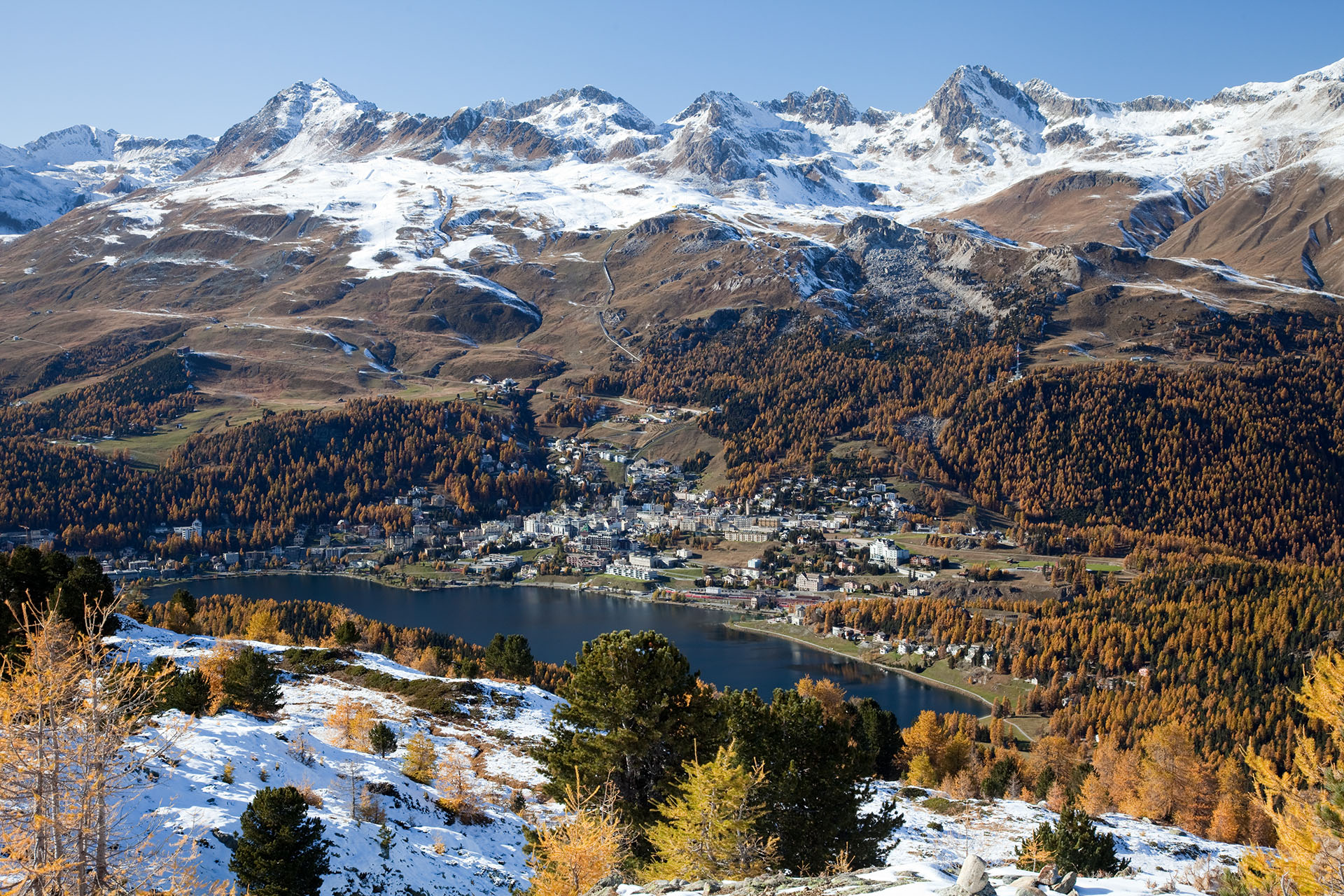
The hills of St. Moritz hosted cross-country skiing at the 1928 and 1948 Winter Olympics.

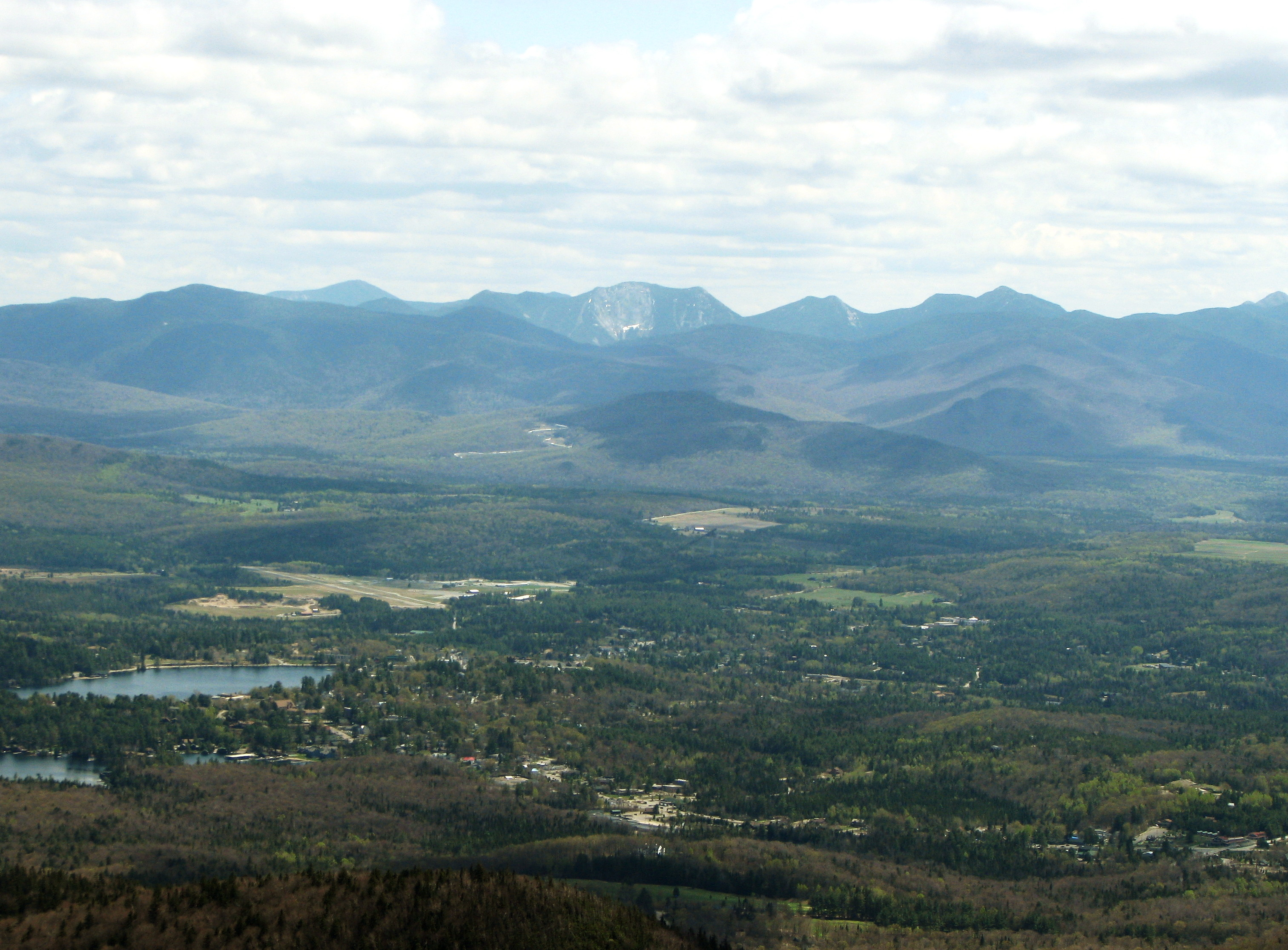
Lake Placid hosted cross-country skiing at the 1932 Winter Olympics.

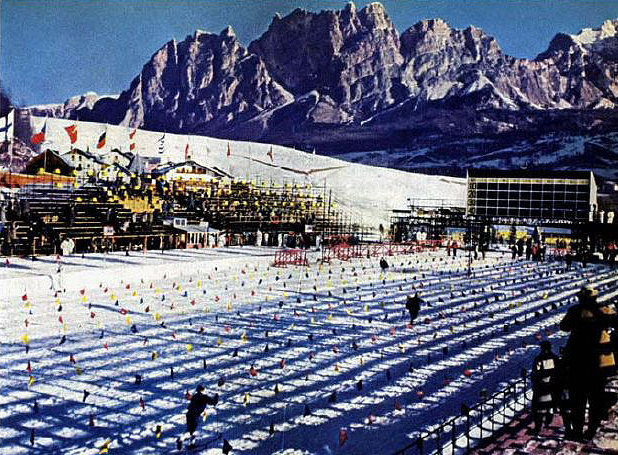
Stadio della neve hosted cross country skiing at the 1956 Winter Olympics in Cortina d’Ampezzo.

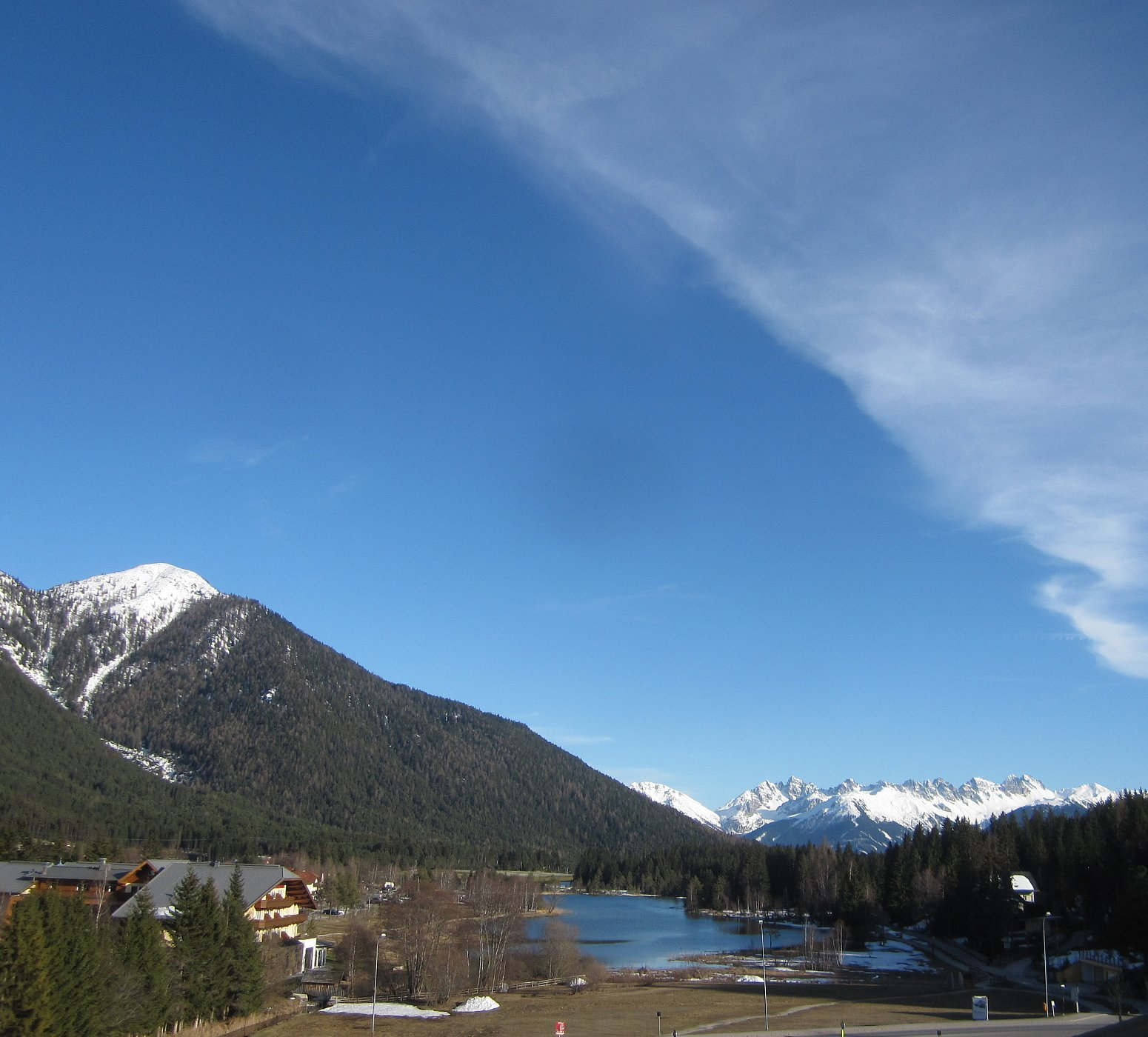
Seefeld in Tirol hosted cross-country skiing at the 1964 and 1976 Winter Olympics in Innsbruck.

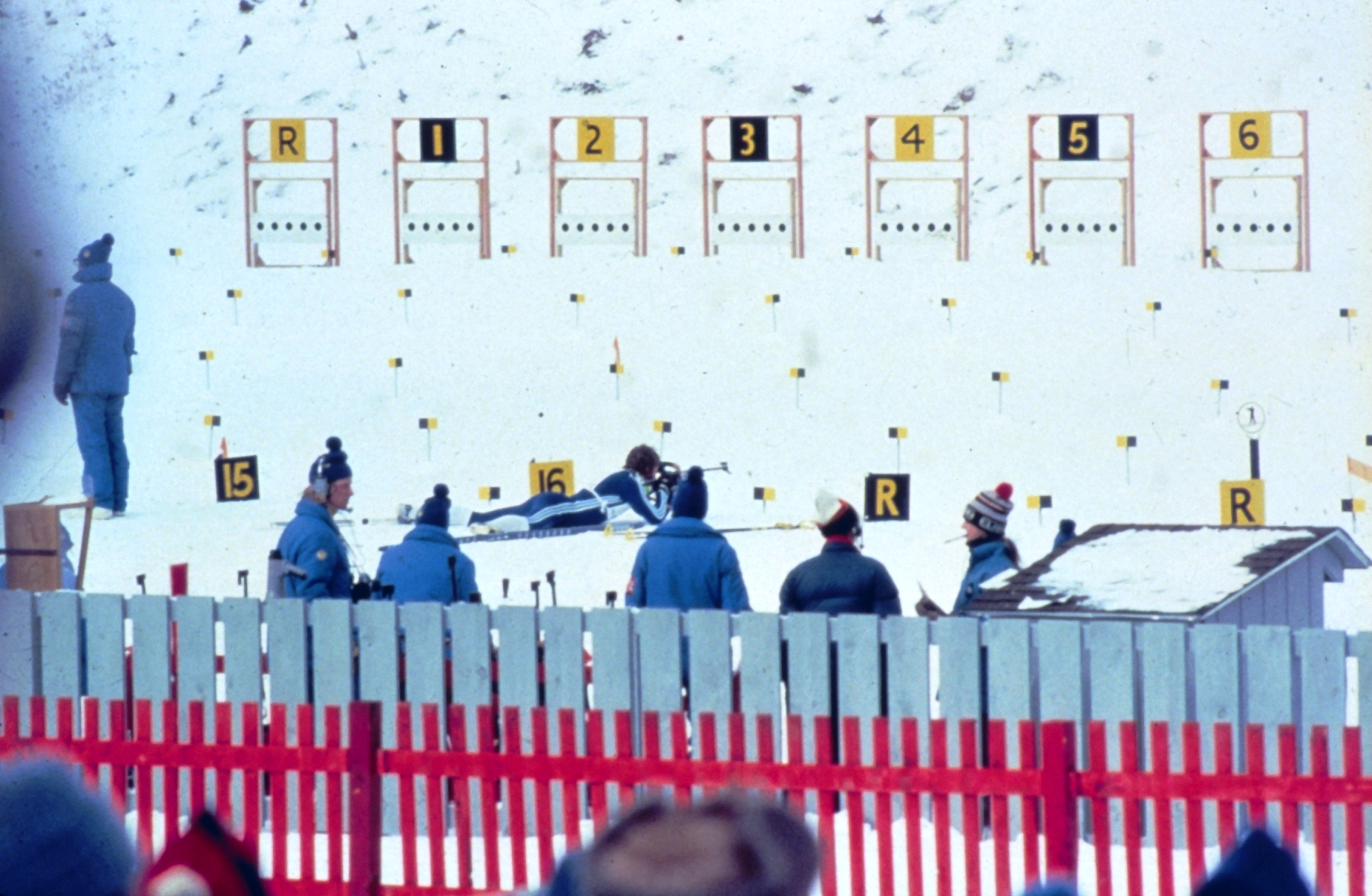
Lake Placid Olympic Sports Complex Cross Country Biathlon Center hosted cross-country skiing at the 1980 Winter Olympics.

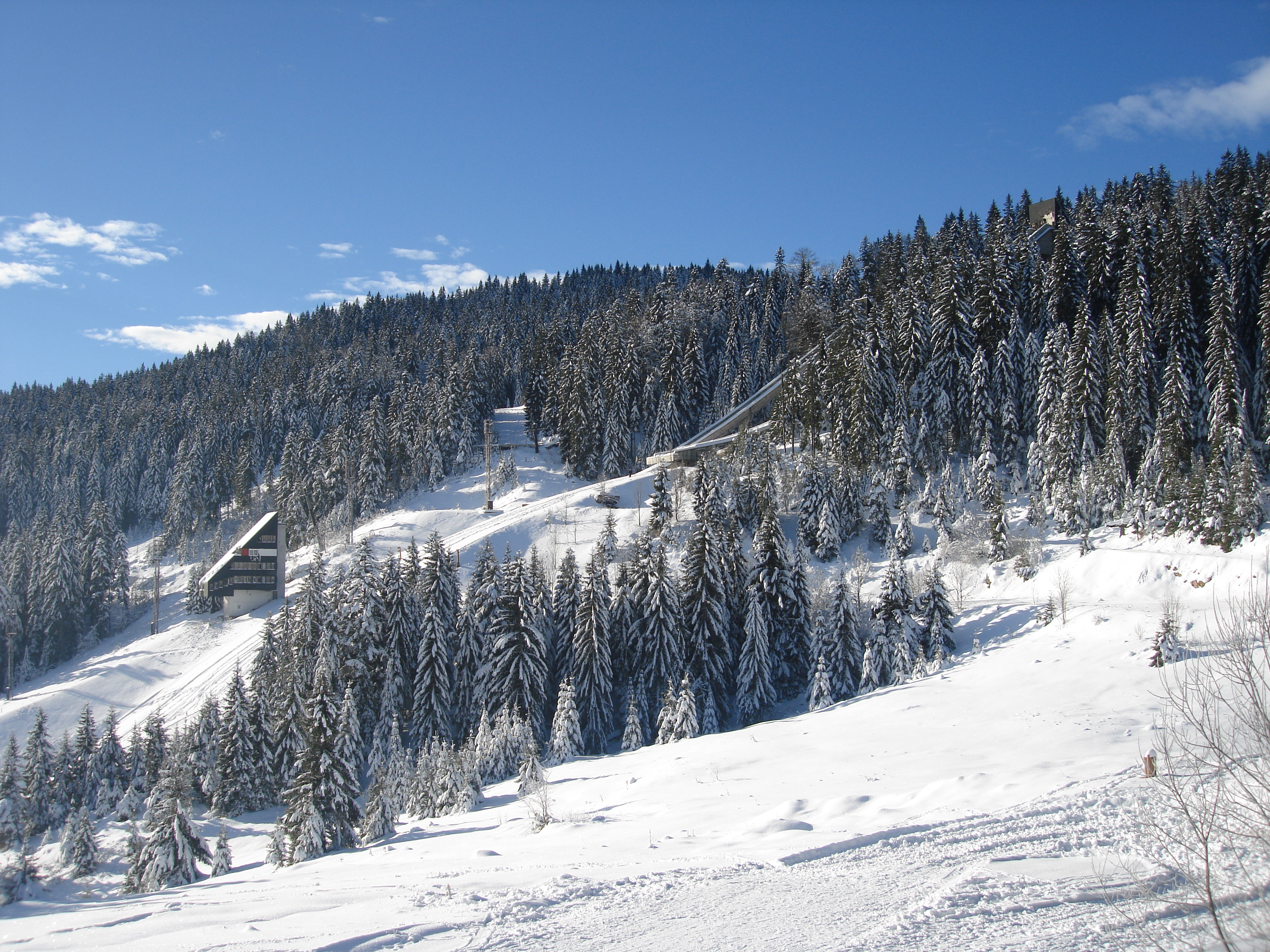
Igman hosted cross-country skiing at the 1984 Winter Olympics in Sarajevo.

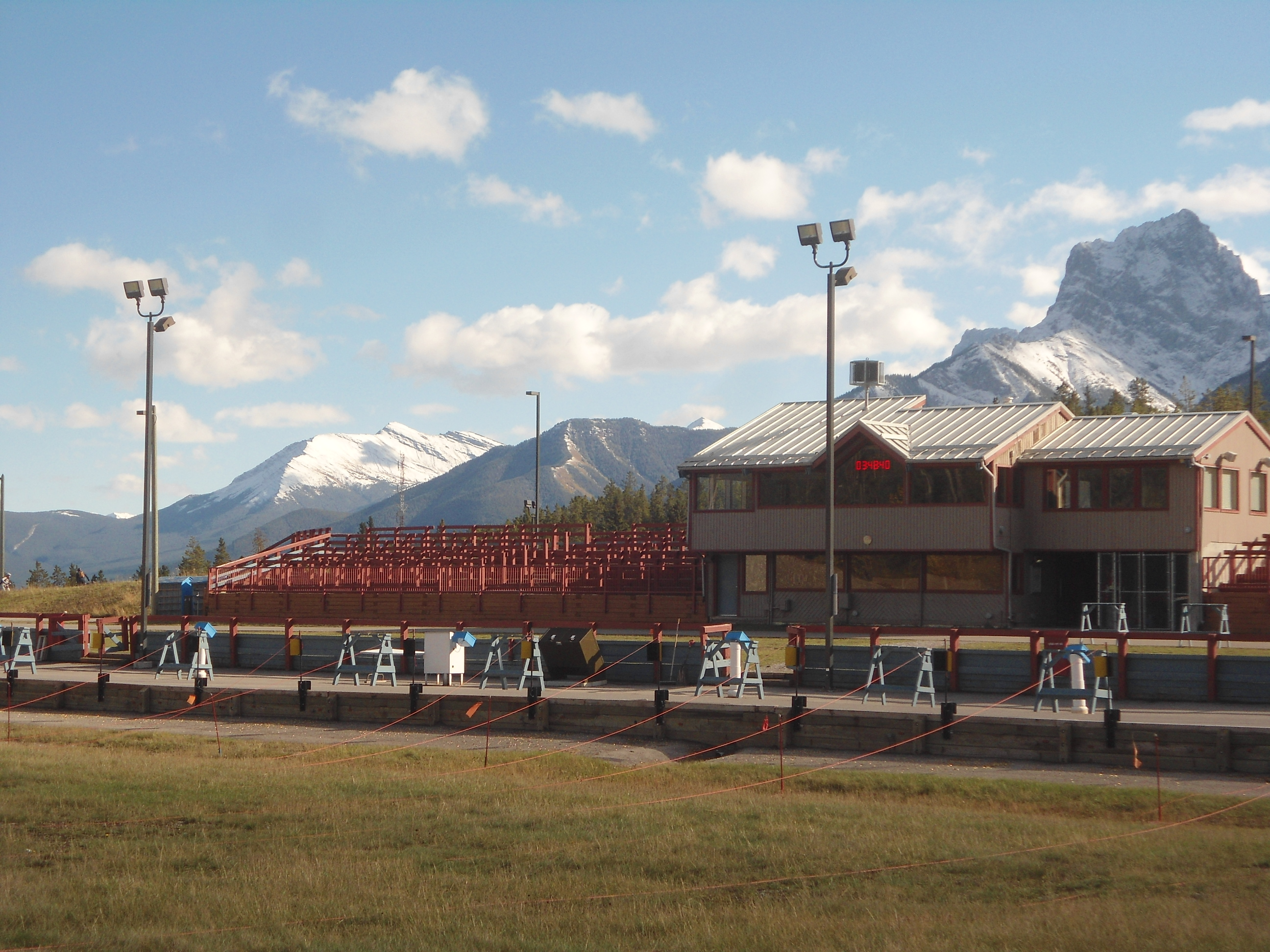
Canmore Nordic Centre Provincial Park hosted cross-country skiing at the 1988 Winter Olympics in Calgary.

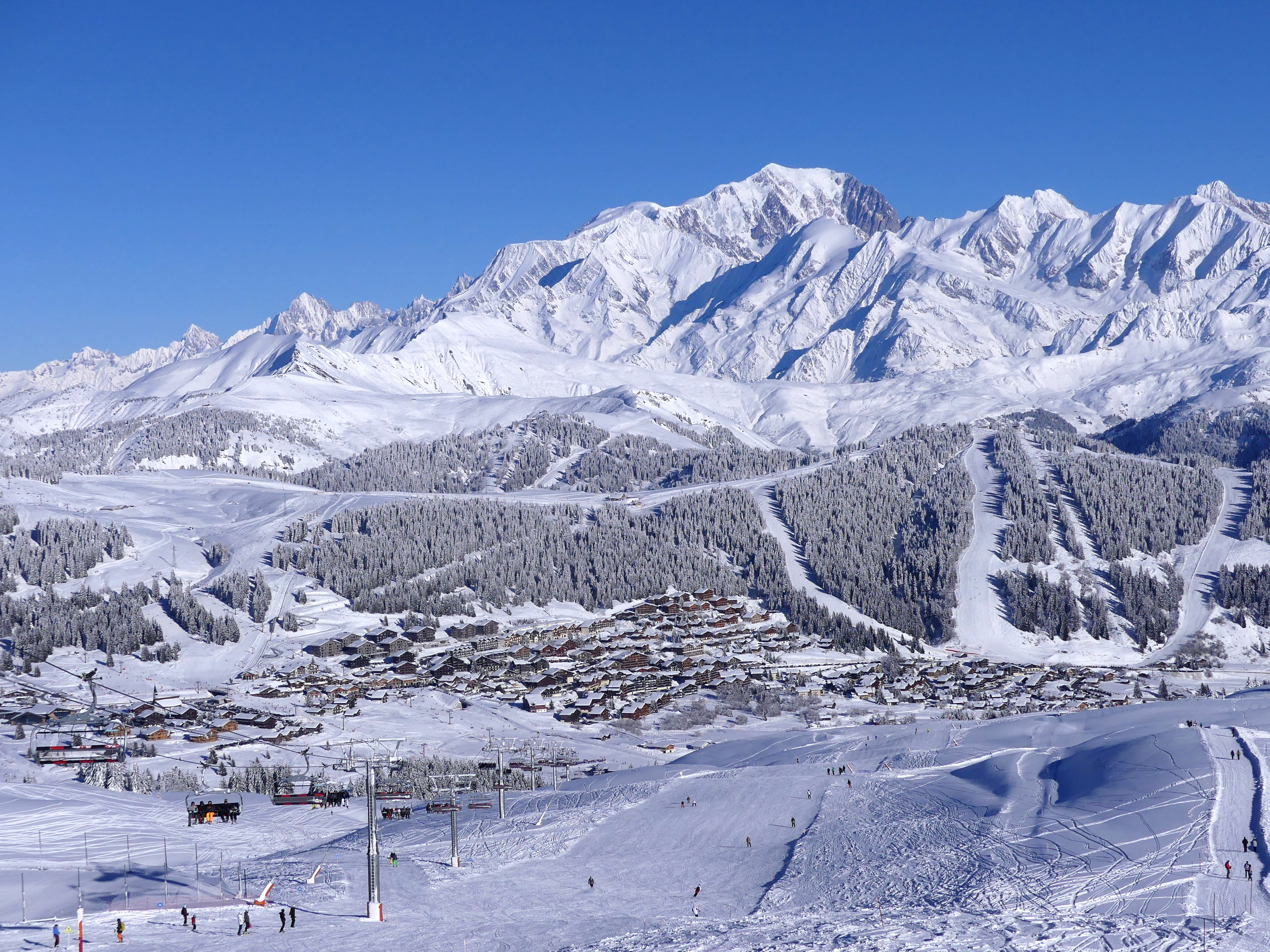
Les Saisies hosted cross-country skiing at the 1992 Winter Olympics in Albertville.

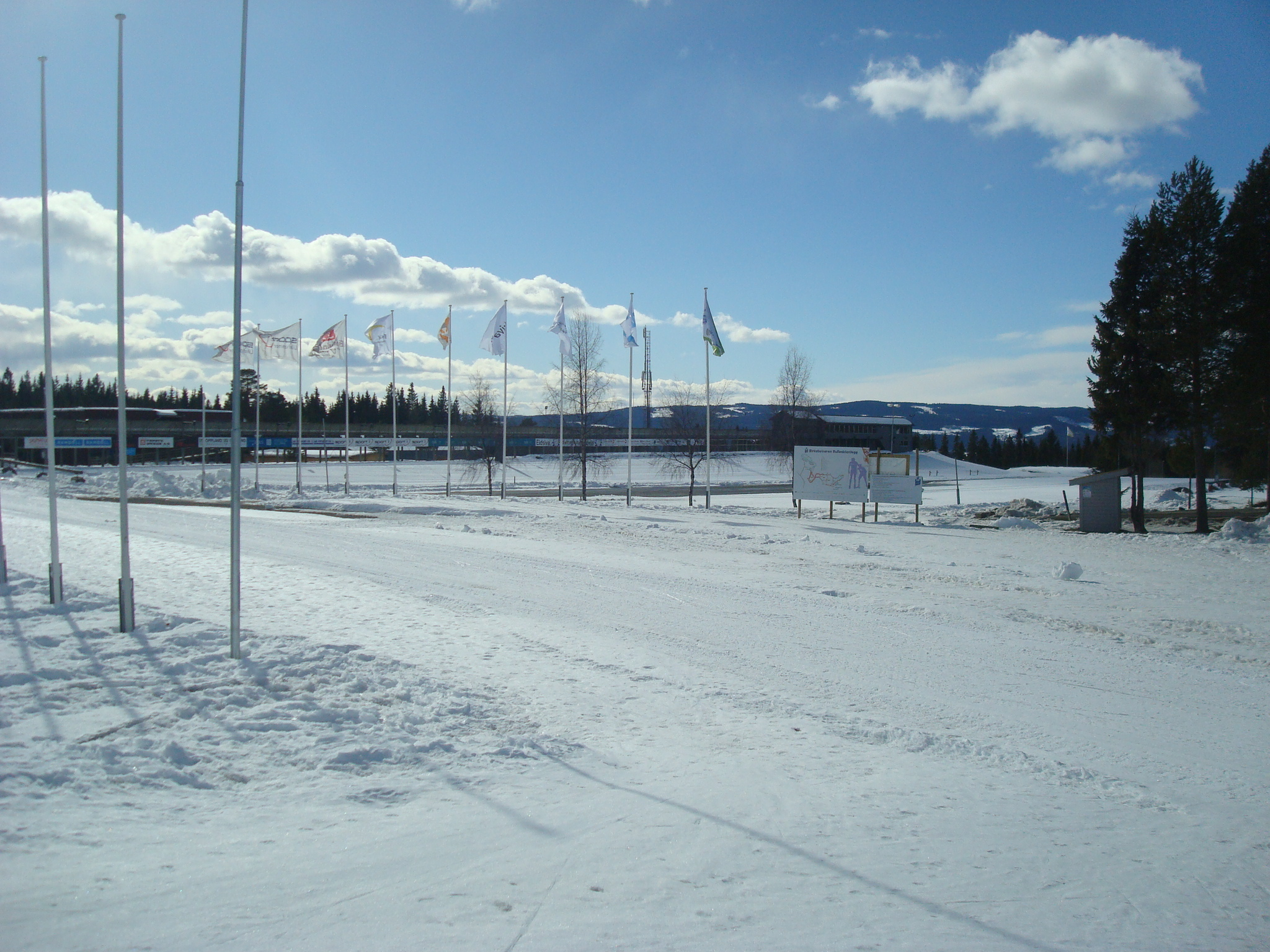
Birkebeineren Ski Stadium hosted cross-country skiing at the 1994 Winter Olympics in Lillehammer.

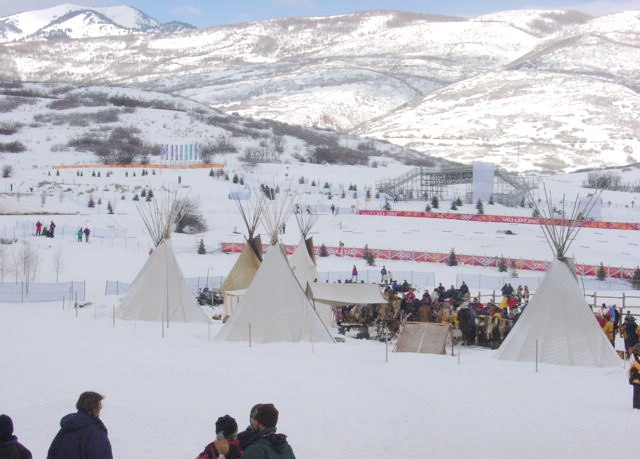
Soldier Hollow hosted cross-country skiing at the 2002 Winter Olympics in Salt Lake City and will do so again at the 2034 Winter Olympics.

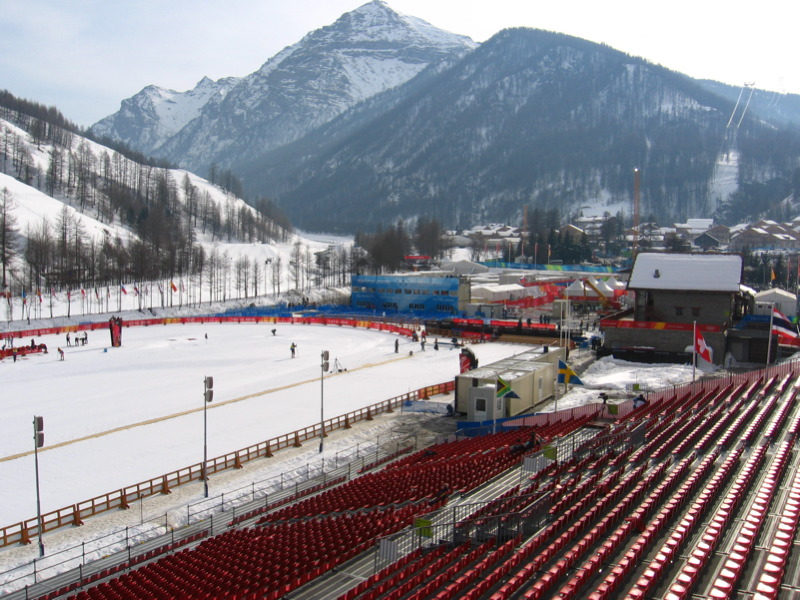
Pragelato Plan hosted cross-country skiing at the 2006 Winter Olympics in Turin.

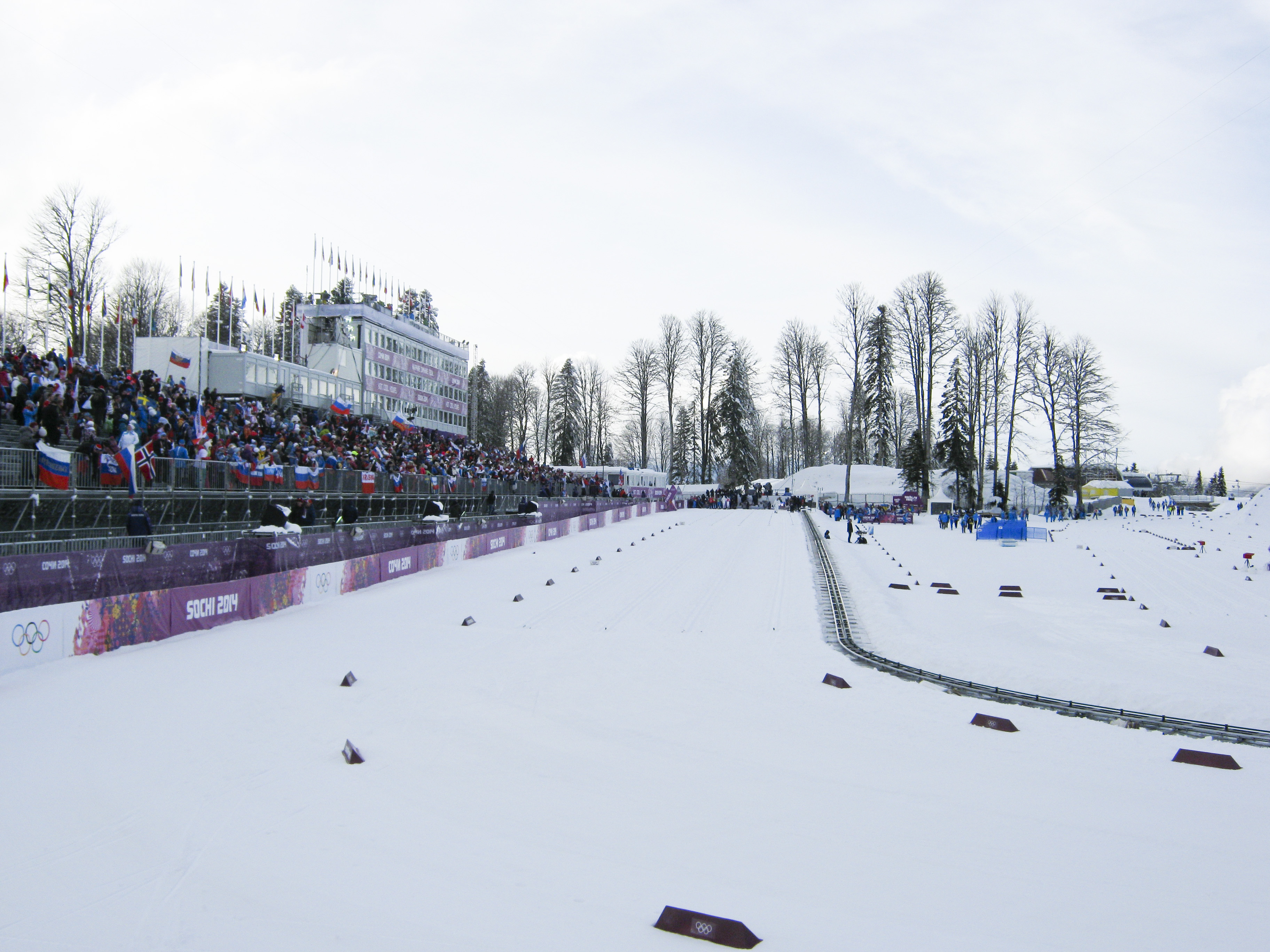
Laura Biathlon & Ski Complex hosted cross-country skiing at the 2014 Winter Olympics in Sochi.

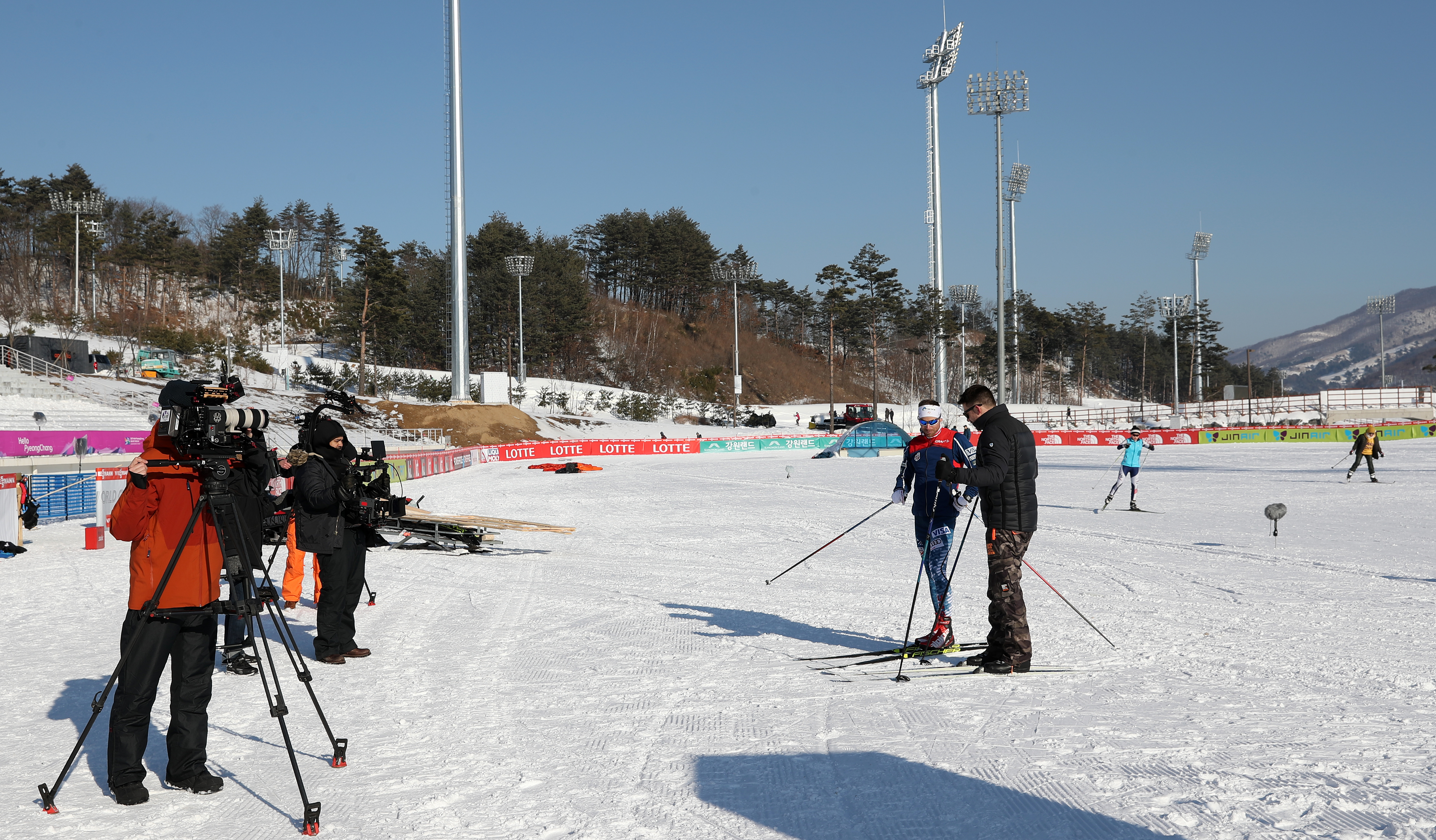
Alpensia Cross-Country Skiing Centre hosted cross-country skiing at the 2018 Winter Olympics in Pyeongchang.

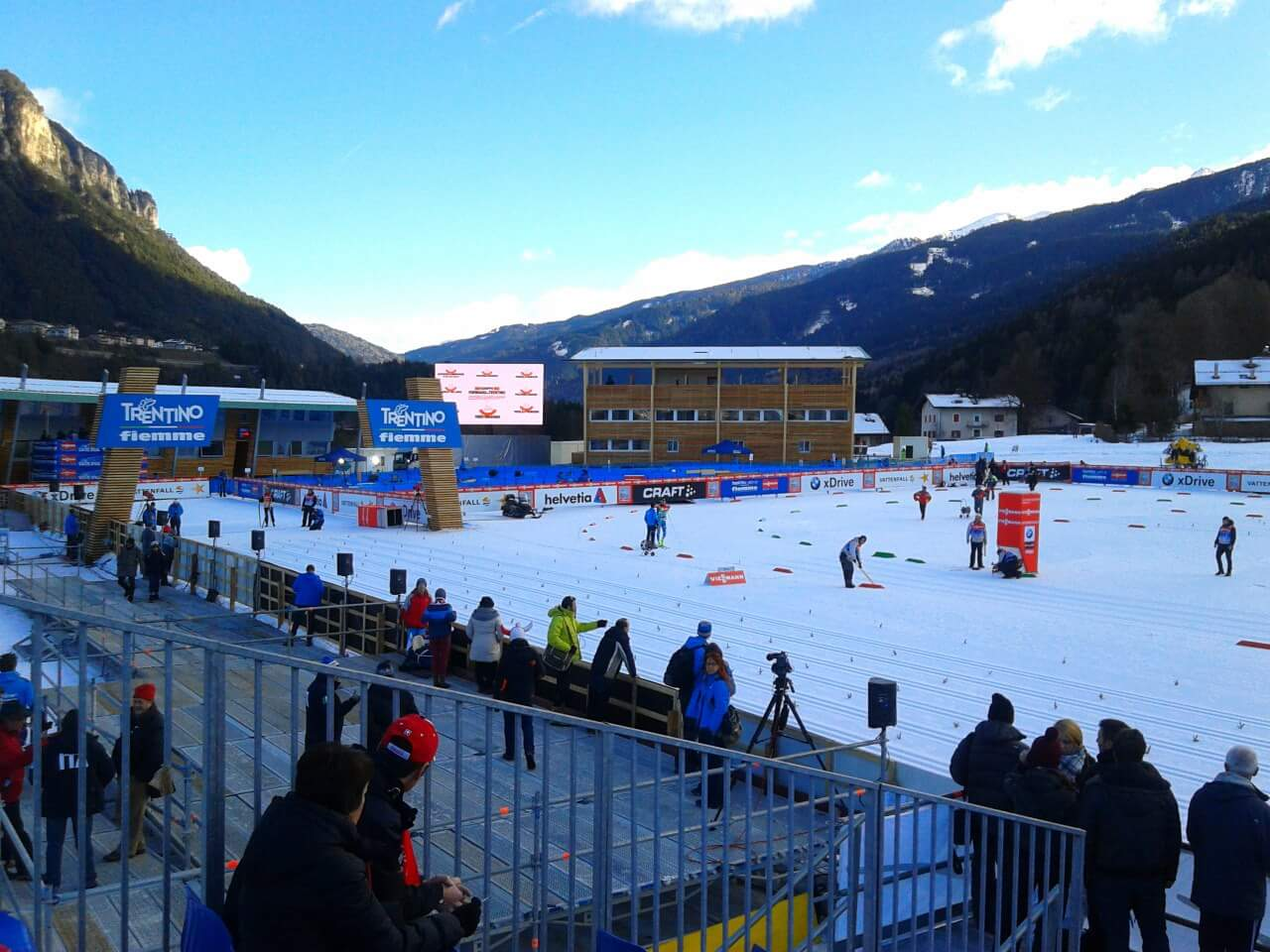
Cross country and biathlon center Fabio Canal hosted cross-country skiing at the 2026 Winter Olympics in Milan and Cortina d’Ampezzo.

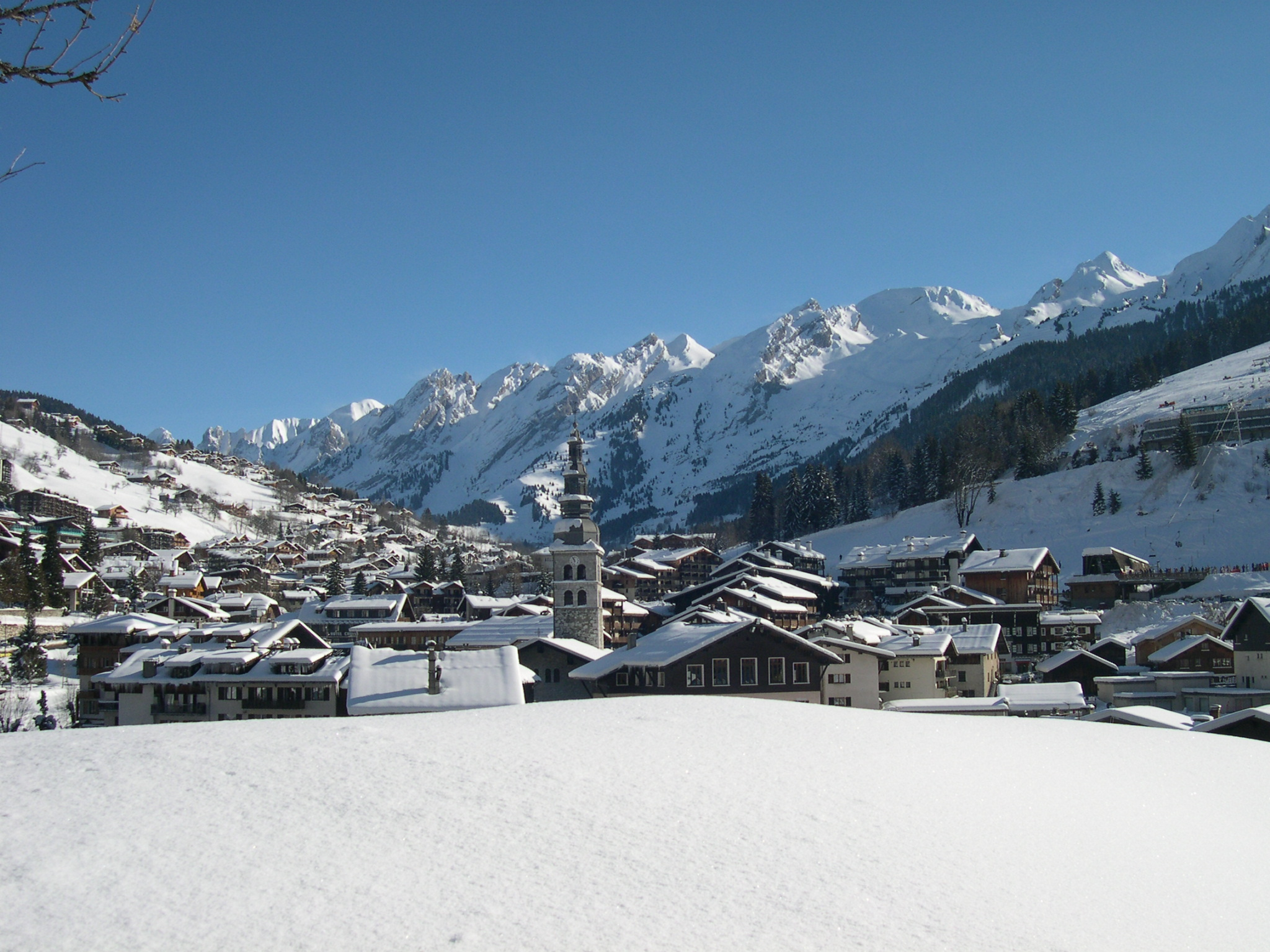
La Clusaz will host cross-country skiing at the 2030 Winter Olympics in the French Alps.
