= 1995–96 FIS Nordic Combined World Cup =

International skiing competition

Nordic Combined World Cup 1995/96
Winners
- Overall: (Norway) Knut Tore Apeland
- Nations Cup: Norway

Competitions
- Venues: 13
- Individual: 13

The 1995/96 FIS Nordic Combined World Cup was the 13th world cup season, a combination of ski jumping and cross-country skiing organized by FIS. It started on 6 Dec 1995 in Steamboat Springs, United States and ended on 16 March 1996 in Oslo, Norway.

== Calendar ==
=== Men ===
Num	Season	Date	Place	Hill	Discipline	Winner	Second	Third
99	1	6 December 1995	(United States) Steamboat Springs	Howelsen Hill	K88 / 15 km	(United States) Todd Lodwick	(Norway) Bård Jørgen Elden	(Switzerland) Marco Zarucchi
100	2	16 December 1995	(Switzerland) St. Moritz	Olympiaschanze	K95 / 15 km	(Norway) Knut Tore Apeland	(Japan) Kenji Ogiwara	(Norway) Bjarte Engen Vik
101	3	19 December 1995	(Italy) Val di Fiemme	Trampolino dal Ben	K120 / 15 km	(Finland) Jari Mantila	(Norway) Knut Tore Apeland	(Norway) Fred Børre Lundberg
102	4	6 January 1996	(Germany) Schonach	Langenwaldschanze	K90 / 15 km	(Norway) Fred Børre Lundberg	(Japan) Kenji Ogiwara	(Norway) Knut Tore Apeland
103	5	13 January 1996	(Slovakia) Štrbské Pleso	MS 1970 A	K120 / 15 km	(Japan) Kenji Ogiwara	(Finland) Jari Mantila	(Norway) Knut Tore Apeland
104	6	20 January 1996	(Czech Republic) Liberec	Ještěd A	K120 / 15 km	(France) Sylvain Guillaume	(Japan) Kenji Ogiwara	(Norway) Knut Tore Apeland
105	7	4 February 1996	(Austria) Seefeld	Toni-Seelos-Olympiaschanze	K90 / 15 km	(Norway) Knut Tore Apeland	(France) Sylvain Guillaume	(United States) Todd Lodwick
106	8	10 February 1996	(France) Chaux-Neuve	La Côté Feuillée	K90 / 15 km	(Japan) Kenji Ogiwara	(Norway) Knut Tore Apeland	(Norway) Halldor Skard
107	9	18 February 1996	(Austria) Murau	Hans-Walland Großschanze	K120 / 15 km	(Austria) Mario Stecher	(Finland) Jari Mantila	(Japan) Kouji Takasawa
108	10	23 February 1996	(Norway) Trondheim	Granåsen	K120 / 15 km	(Norway) Knut Tore Apeland	(Finland) Hannu Manninen	(Japan) Kenji Ogiwara
109	11	2 March 1996	(Finland) Lahti	Salpausselkä	K114 / 15 km	(Norway) Bjarte Engen Vik	(Norway) Knut Tore Apeland	(Finland) Hannu Manninen
110	12	8 March 1996	(Sweden) Falun	Lugnet	K115 / 15 km	(Finland) Hannu Manninen	(Japan) Kenji Ogiwara	(Finland) Jari Mantila
111	13	16 March 1996	(Norway) Oslo	Holmenkollbakken	K110 / 15 km	(Norway) Bjarte Engen Vik	(Norway) Knut Tore Apeland	(Norway) Halldor Skard

== Standings ==
=== Overall ===
Rank		Points
1	(Norway) Knut Tore Apeland	1456
2	(Japan) Kenji Ogiwara	1256
3	(Finland) Jari Mantila	1147
4	(Norway) Bjarte Engen Vik	901
5	(Norway) Halldor Skard	808
6	(France) Sylvain Guillaume	799
7	(Norway) Fred Børre Lundberg	672
8	(Finland) Hannu Manninen	639
9	(Germany) Jens Deimel	583
10	(Austria) Mario Stecher	555

- Standings after 13 events.

=== Nations Cup ===
Rank		Points
1	Norway	5661
2	Finland	2742
3	Japan	2436
4	France	2005
5	Germany	1794
6	Austria	1782
7	Switzerland	1234
8	United States	991
9	Czech Republic	950
10	Italy	570

- Standings after 13 events.
