= 1990–91 FIS Nordic Combined World Cup =

International skiing competition

Nordic Combined World Cup 1990/91
Winners
- Overall: (Norway) Fred Børre Lundberg
- Nations Cup: Norway

Competitions
- Venues: 8
- Individual: 8

The 1990/91 FIS Nordic Combined World Cup was the eight World Cup season, a combination of ski jumping and cross-country skiing organized by International Ski Federation. It started on 15 Dec 1990 in Trondheim, Norway and ended on 23 March 1991 in St. Moritz, Switzerland.

== Calendar ==
=== Men ===
Num	Season	Date	Place	Hill	Discipline	Winner	Second	Third
56	1	15 December 1990	(Norway) Trondheim	Granåsen	K90 / 15 km	(Norway) Fred Børre Lundberg	(Norway) Trond Einar Elden	(Austria) Klaus Sulzenbacher
57	2	29 December 1990	(Germany) Oberwiesenthal	Fichtelbergschanzen	K90 / 15 km	(Austria) Klaus Sulzenbacher	(Norway) Fred Børre Lundberg	(Switzerland) Hippolyt Kempf
58	3	5 January 1991	(Germany) Schonach	Langenwaldschanze	K90 / 15 km	(Norway) Fred Børre Lundberg	(Switzerland) Hippolyt Kempf	(Germany) Hans-Peter Pohl
59	4	12 January 1991	(Austria) Bad Goisern	Kalmberg-Schanzen	K90 / 15 km	(Austria) Klaus Sulzenbacher	(Switzerland) Hippolyt Kempf	(Norway) Fred Børre Lundberg
FIS Nordic World Ski Championships 1991
60	5	2 March 1991	(Finland) Lahti	Salpausselkä	K90 / 15 km	(Norway) Trond Einar Elden	(Germany) Thomas Abratis	(Norway) Fred Børre Lundberg
61	6	8 March 1991	(Sweden) Falun	Lugnet	K89 / 15 km	(Norway) Trond Einar Elden	(France) Fabrice Guy	(Austria) Klaus Sulzenbacher
62	7	15 March 1991	(Norway) Oslo	Holmenkollbakken	K110 / 15 km	(Norway) Trond Einar Elden	(Norway) Fred Børre Lundberg	(Norway) Frode Moen
63	8	23 March 1991	(Switzerland) St. Moritz	Olympiaschanze	K94 / 15 km	(Austria) Klaus Sulzenbacher	(Japan) Masashi Abe	(Norway) Trond Einar Elden

== Standings ==
=== Overall ===
Rank		Points
1	(Norway) Fred Børre Lundberg	142
2	(Austria) Klaus Sulzenbacher	137
3	(Norway) Trond Einar Elden	123
4	(Switzerland) Hippolyt Kempf	78
5	(Soviet Union) Allar Levandi	60
6	(France) Fabrice Guy	59
7	(Japan) Masashi Abe	54
8	(Norway) Knut Tore Apeland	52
9	(Norway) Frode Moen	37
10	(Germany) Hans-Peter Pohl	34

- Standings after 8 events.

=== Nations Cup ===
Rank		Points
1	Norway	456
2	Austria	211
3	Switzerland	134
4	France	119
5	Germany	112
6	Japan	81
7	Soviet Union	60
8	Czechoslovakia	51
9	Poland	12
10	Finland	11

- Standings after 8 events.
