= Kogawa =

Kogawa (written: 湖川 or 古川) is a Japanese surname. Notable people with the surname include:

- Joy Kogawa (born 1935), Canadian poet and novelist
- Junichi Kogawa (古川 純一, born 1972), Japanese Nordic combined skier
- Tomonori Kogawa (湖川 友謙, born 1950), Japanese animator and character designer
