= Abratis =

Abratis is a surname. Notable people with the surname include:

- Thomas Abratis (born 1967), East German and German Nordic skier
- Herbert Abratis (1918–1945), German military figure
