= Nordic skiing at the 1998 Winter Olympics =

At the 1998 Winter Olympics, fifteen Nordic skiing events were contested – ten cross-country skiing events, three ski jumping events, and two Nordic combined events.

Nordic skiing discipline	Men's events	Women's events
Cross-country skiing	• 10 km (classical)	• 5 km (classical)
Cross-country skiing	• Combined 10 km + 15 km pursuit	• Combined 5 km + 10 km pursuit
Cross-country skiing	• 30 km (classical)	• 15 km (classical)
Cross-country skiing	• 50 km (freestyle)	• 30 km (freestyle)
Cross-country skiing	• 4 × 10 km relay	• 4 × 5 km relay
Ski jumping	• Large hill – individual	none
Ski jumping	• Normal hill – individual	none
Ski jumping	• Large hill – team	none
Nordic combined	• Individual	none
Nordic combined	• Team	none
