= Roman Perko =

Slovenian Nordic combined skier

Personal information
- Nationality: Slovenian
- Born: 12 May 1977 (age 47); Tržič, Yugoslavia

Sport
- Sport: Nordic combined

Roman Perko (born 12 May 1977) is a Slovenian skier. He competed in the Nordic combined event at the 1998 Winter Olympics.
