= Frode Moen =

Norwegian Nordic combined skier

Frode Moen (born 1 May 1969) is a retired Norwegian Nordic combined skier.

Representing the sports club Byåsen IL, he competed in the Nordic Combined World Cup. In the 1990–91 season he placed ninth overall, and seventh overall in 1991–92.

== See also ==
- 1990–91 FIS Nordic Combined World Cup
- 1991–92 FIS Nordic Combined World Cup
