= Josef Buchner (skier) =

German Nordic combined skier

Personal information
- Nationality: German
- Born: 16 May 1974 (age 50); Traunstein, Germany

Sport
- Sport: Nordic combined

Josef Buchner (born 16 May 1974) is a German former skier. He competed in the Nordic combined event at the 1998 Winter Olympics.
