= Konstantin Kalinovsky =

Belarusian Nordic combined skier

Personal information
- Nationality: Belarusian
- Born: 3 September 1975 (age 50)

Sport
- Sport: Nordic combined

Konstantin Kalinovsky (born 3 September 1975) is a Belarusian skier. He competed in the Nordic combined event at the 1998 Winter Olympics.
