= Denis Tishagin =

Russian Nordic combined skier

Personal information
- Nationality: Russian
- Born: 4 July 1975 (age 49); Perm, Russia

Sport
- Sport: Nordic combined

Denis Tishagin (born 4 July 1975) is a Russian skier. He competed in the Nordic combined event at the 1998 Winter Olympics.
