= Kouji Takasawa =

Japanese Nordic combined skier (born 1974)

Kouji Takasawa (高沢 公治, Takasawa Kōji; born 13 August 1974) is a retired Japanese Nordic combined skier.

In his debut season in the Nordic Combined World Cup, 1995–96, he finished tenth in his first race in Schonach and managed a third place in Murau. After the 1995–96 season he did not appear in the World Cup again until 2000, when he achieved more modest results. He continued competing in World Cup B events until 2002.
