= Jozef Bachleda =

Slovak skier (born 1973)

Personal information
- Nationality: Slovak
- Born: 23 February 1973 (age 52); Poprad, Czechoslovakia

Sport
- Sport: Nordic combined

Jozef Bachleda (born 23 February 1973) is a Slovak skier. He competed in the Nordic combined event at the 1994 Winter Olympics.
