= Dmytro Prosvirnin =

Ukrainian Nordic combined skier

Personal information
- Nationality: Ukrainian
- Born: 7 January 1967 (age 58); Vorokhta, Ukraine

Sport
- Sport: Nordic combined

Dmytro Prosvirnin (born 7 January 1967) is a Ukrainian skier. He competed in the Nordic combined event at the 1994 Winter Olympics.
