= Thorsten Schmitt =

German Nordic combined skier

Medal record

Men's Nordic combined

Representing Germany

World Championships
Silver medal – second place	2003 Val di Fiemme	4 x 5 km team

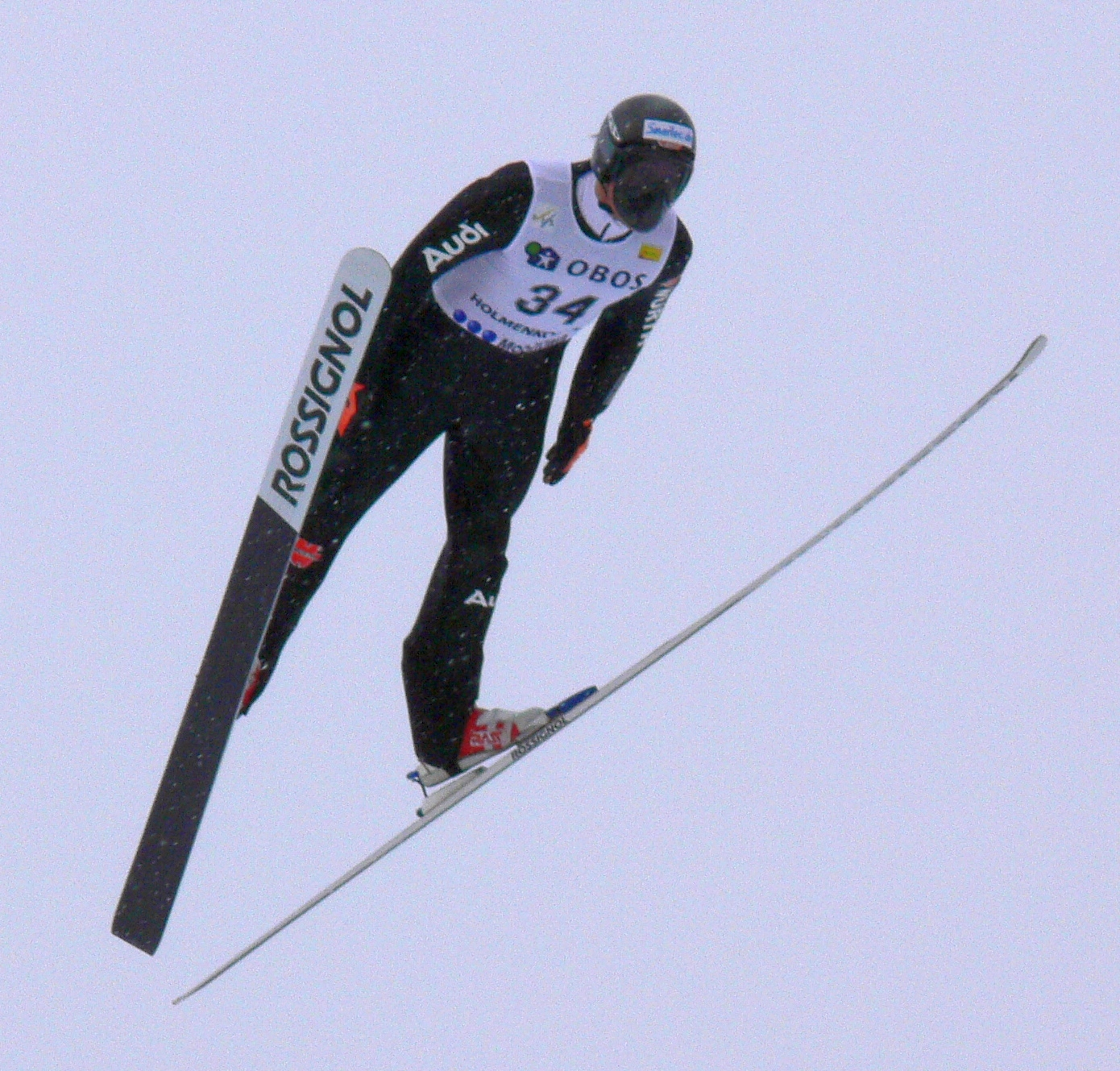
Thorsten Schmitt

Thorsten Schmitt (born 20 September 1975 in Villingen-Schwenningen, Baden-Württemberg) is a German Nordic combined skier who has been competing since 1998. He won a silver medal in the 4 x 5 km team event at the 2003 FIS Nordic World Ski Championships in Val di Fiemme.

Schmitt competed in the 1998 Winter Olympics in Nagano, finishing sixth in the 4 x 5 km team event.

Schmitt's lone individual victory occurred in 1998 in a 15 km individual event in Germany.
