= Robert Stadelmann =

Austrian Nordic combined skier

Medal record

Men's Nordic combined

World Championships
Bronze medal – third place	1997 Trondheim	4 × 5 km team

Robert Stadelmann (born 23 January 1972, in Marburg) is an Austrian Nordic combined skier who competed during the 1990s. He won a bronze medal in the 4 x 5 km team event at the 1997 FIS Nordic World Ski Championships in Trondheim and finished 52nd in the 15 km individual at the 1999 championships.

Stadelmann's only individual career victory was in a World Cup event in Chamonix, France in 1999.
