= Étienne Gouy =

French Nordic combined skier

Personal information
- Nationality: French
- Born: 11 December 1973 (age 51); Manosque, France

Sport
- Sport: Nordic combined

Étienne Gouy (born 11 December 1973) is a French former skier. He competed in the Nordic combined event at the 1994 Winter Olympics.
