= Falk Schwaar =

German Nordic combined skier

Personal information
- Nationality: German
- Born: 28 April 1971 (age 53); Bautzen, Germany

Sport
- Sport: Nordic combined

Falk Schwaar (born 28 April 1971) is a German former skier. He competed in the Nordic combined event at the 1994 Winter Olympics.
