= Markus Wüst =

Swiss Nordic combined skier

Medal record

Men's Nordic combined

World Championships
Bronze medal – third place	1995 Thunder Bay	4 x 5 km team

Markus Wüst (born 26 December 1971) is a former Swiss Nordic combined skier who competed from 1990 to 1995. He won a bronze medal in the 4 x 5 km team event at the 1995 FIS Nordic World Ski Championships in Thunder Bay, Ontario.

Wüst's earned two individual career victories, both in the 15 km event in 1993 and 1995.
