= Michal Giacko =

Slovak Nordic combined skier

Personal information
- Nationality: Slovak
- Born: 27 September 1969 (age 55); Poprad, Czechoslovakia

Sport
- Sport: Nordic combined

Michal Giacko (born 27 September 1969) is a Slovak skier. He competed in the Nordic combined event at the 1994 Winter Olympics.
