= Zbyněk Pánek =

Czech Nordic combined skier (born 1972)

Zbyněk Pánek (born 4 September 1972) is a former Czech Nordic combined skier who competed from 1991 to 1995. He finished fifth in the 3 × 10 km team event at the 1994 Winter Olympics in Lillehammer.

Pánek earned two career victories both in World Cup B 15 km individual events (1992, 1995).
