= Stanislav Dubrovsky =

Russian Nordic combined skier

Personal information
- Nationality: Russian
- Born: 5 July 1974 (age 50); Saint Petersburg, Russia

Sport
- Sport: Nordic combined

Stanislav Dubrovsky (born 5 July 1974) is a Russian skier. He competed in the Nordic combined event at the 1994 Winter Olympics.
