= Georg Riedlsperger =

Austrian Nordic combined skier

Personal information
- Nationality: Austrian
- Born: 6 May 1969 (age 56) Schwarzach im Pongau, Austria

Sport
- Sport: Nordic combined

Georg Riedlsperger (born 6 May 1969) is an Austrian skier. He competed in the Nordic combined event at the 1994 Winter Olympics.
