= Ryan Heckman =

American Nordic combined skier

Personal information
- Full name: Steven Ryan Heckman
- Nationality: American
- Born: March 7, 1974 (age 52) Houston, Texas, United States

Sport
- Sport: Nordic combined

Ryan Heckman (born March 7, 1974) is an American Nordic combined skier who competed from 1992 to 1997. He finished eighth in the 3 x 10 km team event at the 1992 Winter Olympics in Albertville. Heckman's best World Cup finish was eighth in a 15 km individual event in Finland in 1995.

Heckman is now a partner at a private equity firm in Denver, Colorado.
