= Andrea Cecon =

Italian Nordic combined skier

Andrea Cecon (born July 18, 1970 in Gemona del Friuli) was an Italian Nordic combined skier who competed from 1992 to 2001. He also competed as a ski jumper at the 1994 Winter Olympics in Lillehammer, finishing eighth in the team large hill event.

== Career ==
As a Nordic combined athlete, Cecon's best finish at the FIS Nordic World Ski Championships was 20th in the 15 km individual event at Ramsau in 1999. His best World Cup finish was eighth in a 15 km individual event in Norway in 1994. Cecon earned two total career victories at various distances in 1996 and 1998.

== Results ==
- 1988: 3rd, Italian championships of Nordic combined skiing
- 1990: 1st, Italian championships of Nordic combined skiing
- 1991: 2nd, Italian championships of Nordic combined skiing
- 1992: 1st, Italian championships of Nordic combined skiing
- 1993: 2nd, Italian championships of Nordic combined skiing
- 1994: 1st, Italian championships of Nordic combined skiing
- 1995: 2nd, Italian championships of Nordic combined skiing
- 1997: 3rd, Italian championships of Nordic combined skiing
- 1998: 1st, Italian championships of Nordic combined skiing
- 1999: 2nd, Italian championships of Nordic combined skiing
- 2000: 2nd, Italian championships of Nordic combined skiing
