= Roland Braun =

German Nordic combined skier

Personal information
- Nationality: German
- Born: 1 May 1972 (age 52); Freudenstadt, West Germany

Sport
- Sport: Nordic combined

Roland Braun (born 1 May 1972) is a German former skier. He competed in the Nordic combined event at the 1994 Winter Olympics.
