= Topi Sarparanta =

Finnish Nordic combined skier

Personal information
- Full name: Topi Torsten Sarparanta
- Born: 25 May 1975 (age 51) Kouvola, Kymenlaakso, Finland
- Height: 6 ft 0 in (183 cm)

Sport
- Sport: Skiing
- Club: Finland

World Cup career
- Seasons: 1993 - 1998

Topi Saraparanta (born 25 May 1975) was a Finnish Nordic combined skier who competed from 1993 to 1998. He finished eighth in the 3 x 10 km team event at the 1994 Winter Olympics in Lillehammer.

Saraparanta's best World Cup finish was fifth in the 15 km individual event three times (1994 once and 1996 twice). His only victory was in a World Cup B 15 km individual event in Finland in 1995.

At the moment he is coaching Estonian ski jumper Kaarel Nurmsalu.
