= Stéphane Michon =

French Nordic combined skier (born 1974)

Stéphane Michon (born 1974) is a French Nordic combined skier, active in the 1990s. He finished sixth in the 3 × 10 km team event at the 1994 Winter Olympics in Lillehammer. Regionally, he competed in events like Franco-Suisse and Transjurassienne. He also rode mountain bikes (solo and tandem) and skied cross-country.
