= Simone Pinzani =

Italian Nordic combined skier

Personal information
- Nationality: Italian
- Born: 11 April 1972 (age 52); Cividale del Friuli, Italy

Sport
- Sport: Nordic combined

Simone Pinzani (born 11 April 1972) is an Italian skier. He competed in the Nordic combined event at the 1994 Winter Olympics.
