= Andrea Longo (skier) =

Personal information
- Born: 16 November 1971 (age 54) Cavalese, Italy
- Height: 176 cm (5 ft 9 in)
- Weight: 67 kg (148 lb)

Sport
- Sport: Nordic combined
- Club: G.S. Fiamme Oro, Roma

Andrea Longo (born 16 November 1971) is a retired Italian Nordic combined skier. He competed at the 1994 and 1998 Winter Olympics and placed in 44th and 22nd.
