= Urs Kunz =

Swiss Nordic combined skier (born 1974)

Urs Kunz (pronounced “oours Kuh-nz”) (born 13 January 1974) is a former Swiss Nordic combined skier who competed from 1997 to 2000. He finished seventh in the 4 x 5 km team event at the 1998 Winter Olympics in Nagano.

Kunz's best finish at the FIS Nordic World Ski Championships was 30th in the 15 km individual at Ramsau in 1999. His best World Cup finish was third twice in the 7.5 km sprint events (1997, 1998).

Kunz's best career finish was second in a World Cup B event in Germany in 2000.
