= Junichi Kogawa =

Japanese Nordic combined skier

Personal information
- Nationality: Japanese
- Born: 12 February 1972 (age 53); Kanagi, Japan

Sport
- Sport: Nordic combined

Junichi Kogawa (古川 純一, Kogawa Jun'ichi, born 12 February 1972) is a Japanese skier. He competed in the Nordic combineds at the 1994 Winter Olympics and the 1998 Winter Olympics.
