= Tim Tetreault =

American Nordic combined skier

Tim Tetreault (born March 14, 1970) is an American Nordic combined skier who competed from 1992 to 1998. He finished eighth in the 3 x 10 km team event at the 1992 Winter Olympics in Albertville.

Tetreault's best World cup finish was third in a 15 km individual event in Finland in 1997. His only career victory was in a World Cup B 15 km individual event in Germany in 1995.
