= John Jarrett =

American Nordic combined skier (born 1970)

John David Jarrett (born November 18, 1970, in Denver, Colorado) is an American former Nordic combined skier who competed in the 1990s, including at the 1994 Winter Olympics and the 1998 Winter Olympics.

Jarrett finished seventh in the 3 x 10 km team event at the 1994 Winter Olympics in Lillehammer. He also finished 4th in the Team Event at the World Championships in 1995 in Thunder Bay, Canada. He was also 5th in Trondheim, Norway World Championships in the team event. He had many top-15 and top-20 World Cup results as well. He was the first one in his peer group to actually score World Cup points in 1994 in Steamboat Springs, Colorado with a 13th-place finish.

Since retiring in 1998, he began his coaching career while finishing his degree at the University of Colorado Boulder. He has a degree in Kinesiology and Applied Physiology. He coached some XC skiers while at CU and, when he graduated, he moved to Heber City, Utah to start a ski club at Soldier Hollow which was the venue for the 2002 Winter Olympics in Salt Lake City. After the 2002 Olympics, he took a job with the US Ski Team's Nordic Combined program. Eventually, he rose to the head coaching position in 2008. His team won a silver medal in the 2007 World Championships in Sapporo, Japan. In 2009, his team won three golds and one bronze at the World Championships in Liberec. Those medals were split between Todd Lodwick with two golds and Bill Demong with a gold and a bronze. In 2010, his team won 4 out of the 7 medals possible in Nordic Combined skiing at the Winter Olympics. Johnny Spillane won three silver medals, Bill Demong won one gold and one silver and the Nordic Combined Team won the silver medal in the Team Event with Demong, Spillane, Lodwick and Brett Camertota.
