= František Máka =

František Máka (born 27 September 1968 in Jičín) is a former Czech Nordic combined skier who competed from 1990 to 1997. Competing in two Winter Olympics in the 3 × 10 km team event, he finished sixth in 1992 and fifth in 1994.

Máka's best finish at the FIS Nordic World Ski Championships was sixth at Val di Fiemme in 1991. His best World Cup career finish was fourth in a 15 km individual event in Czechoslovakia in 1990.
