= Jean-Yves Cuendet =

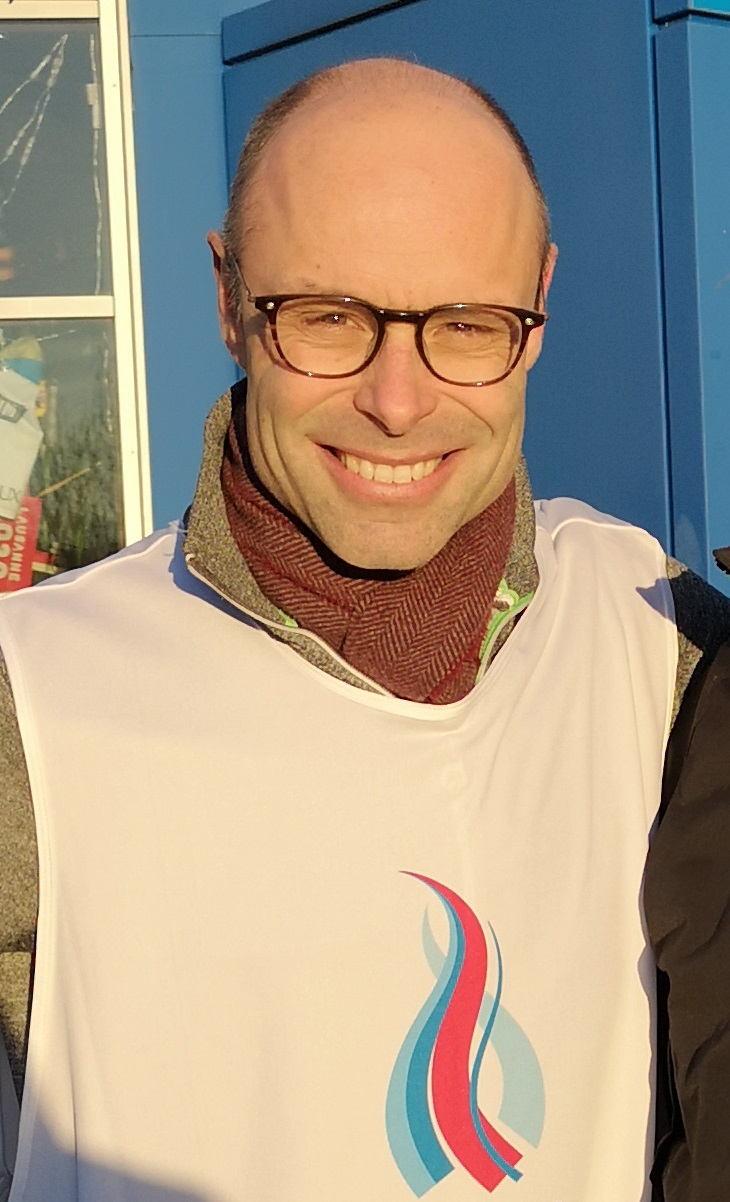
- Jean-Yves Cuendet in 2020.

Medal record

Men's Nordic combined

Olympic Games
| Bronze medal – third place | 1994 Lillehammer | 3 x 10 km team |

World Championships
| Bronze medal – third place | 1995 Thunder Bay | 4 x 5 km team |

Jean-Yves Cuendet (born February 20, 1970) is a retired Swiss Nordic combined skier who competed during the 1990s. He won a bronze medal in the 3 x 10 km team event at the 1994 Winter Olympics in Lillehammer. Cuendet also won a bronze medal in the 4 x 5 km team event at the 1995 FIS Nordic World Ski Championships in Thunder Bay, Ontario.
