= Valeri Stolyarov =

Russian Nordic combined skier

Medal record

Men's Nordic combined

Representing Russia

Olympic Games
Bronze medal – third place	1998 Nagano	15 km individual

World Championships
Bronze medal – third place	1999 Ramsau	4 x 5 km team

Valeri Viktorovich Stolyarov (Russian: Валерий Викторович Столяров); born January 18, 1971) was a former Russian Nordic combined skier who competed during the late 1990s and early 2000s.

He won a bronze in the 15 km individual at the 1998 Winter Olympics in Nagano. Stolyarov also won a bronze medal in the 4 x 5 km team event at the 1999 FIS Nordic World Ski Championships in Ramsau.
