= Tapio Nurmela =

Finnish Nordic combined athlete (born 1975)

Medal record

Men's Nordic combined

Olympic Games
Silver medal – second place	1998 Nagano	4 x 5 km team

World Championships
Gold medal – first place	1999 Ramsau	4 x 5 km team
Silver medal – second place	1997 Trondheim	4 x 5 km team

Tapio Nurmela (born 2 January 1975 in Rovaniemi) is a Finnish Nordic combined athlete who competed during the 1990s. He won a silver medal in the 4 x 5 km team event at the 1998 Winter Olympics in Nagano. Nurmela also won two medals in the 4 x 5 km team event at the FIS Nordic World Ski Championships with a gold in 1999 and a silver in 1997.
