= Ago Markvardt =

Estonian Nordic combined skier

Ago Markvardt (born 11 August 1969 in Elva) is a retired Estonian Nordic combined skier who competed from 1989 to 1998. At the 1994 Winter Olympics in Lillehammer, he finished fifth in the 15 km individual and fourth in the 3 x 10 km team events.

Markvardt finished fourth in the 15 km individual event at the 1997 FIS Nordic World Ski Championships in Trondheim. His best World Cup finish was eighth twice in the 15 km individual event (1994, 1997).

A three-time Olympian Markvardt's only career victory was in a World Cup B 15 km individual event in Germany in 1996.

== Personal ==
He has two daughters: Margaret and Keira Olivia.

Awards
Preceded by Indrek Sei	Estonian Sportsman of the Year; 1994	Succeeded by Jüri Jaanson
