= Magnar Freimuth =

Estonian Nordic combined skier (born 1973)

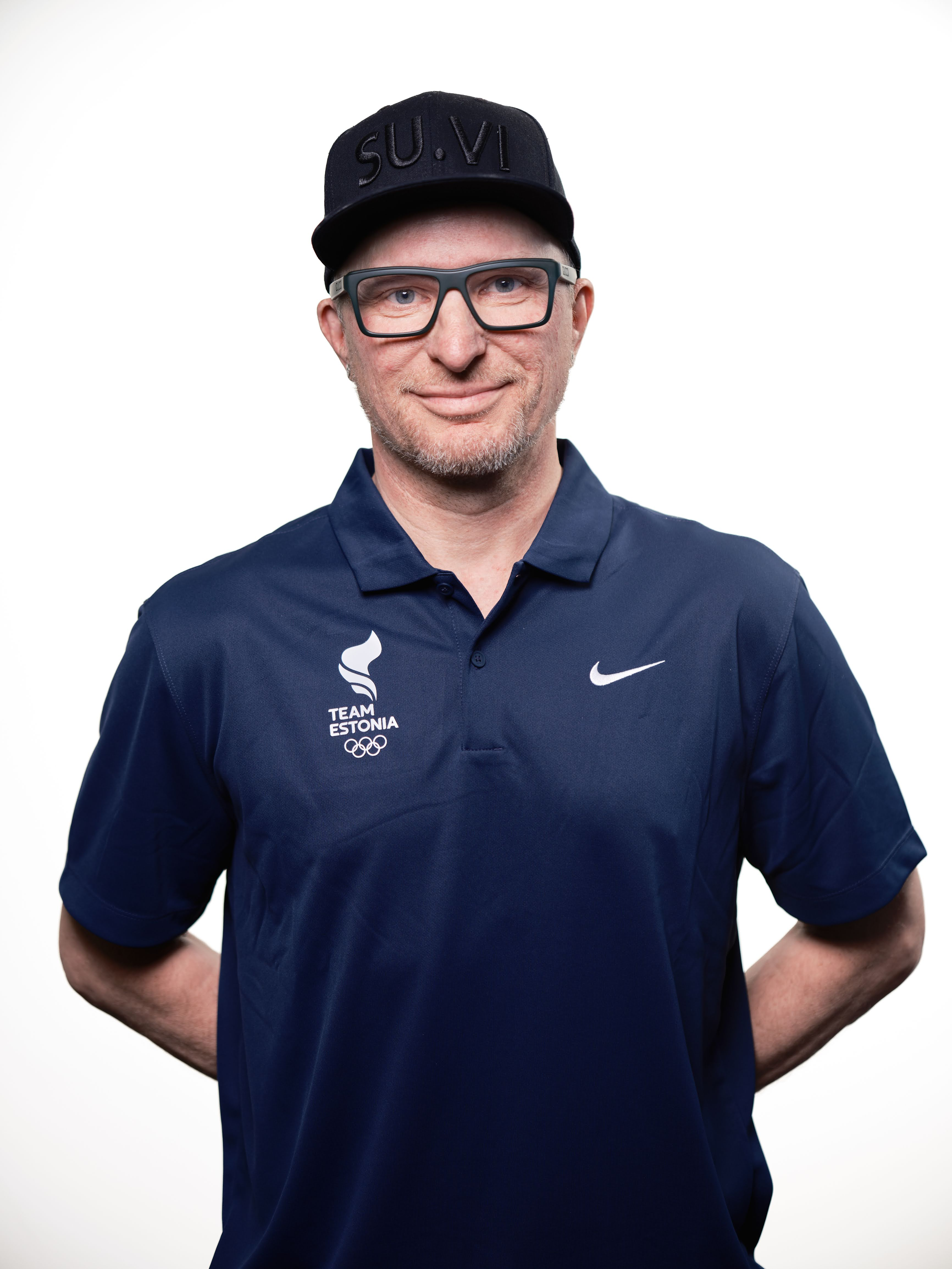
Magnar Freimuth, 2025

Magnar Freimuth (born 20 March 1973) was an Estonian Nordic combined skier who competed in the early 1990s.

He finished 4th in the 3 x 10 km team event at the 1994 Winter Olympics in Lillehammer. He participated also on 1998 Winter Olympics in Nagano.

He was born in Tartu.
