= Thomas Abratis =

East German/German Nordic combined skier (born 1967)

Personal information
- Born: 6 May 1967 (age 59) Waldheim, Sachsen, Germany
Medal record
Men's Nordic combined
Representing East Germany
World Championships
Bronze medal – third place	1989 Lahti	3 x 10 km team

Thomas Abratis (born 6 May 1967 in Waldheim, Sachsen) is a former East German/German Nordic combined skier who competed from 1987 to 1997. He won a bronze medal in the 3 x 10 km team event at the 1989 FIS Nordic World Ski Championships in Lahti.

Abratis earned two individual career victories in Germany in 1993, and, after his retirement from athletics, became a technical delegate for the International Ski Federation.
