= Jari Mantila =

Finnish Nordic combined skier

Medal record

Men's Nordic combined

Olympic Games
Gold medal – first place	2002 Salt Lake City	4 x 5 km team
Silver medal – second place	1998 Nagano	4 x 5 km team

World Championships
Gold medal – first place	1999 Ramsau	4 x 5 km team
Silver medal – second place	1995 Thunder Bay	15 km individual
Silver medal – second place	1997 Trondheim	4 x 5 km team
Bronze medal – third place	2001 Lahti	4 x 5 km team

Jari Mantila (born 14 July 1971 in Kotka) is a Finnish Nordic combined athlete who competed from 1992 to 2003. He won a gold medal in the 4 x 5 km team event at the 2002 Winter Olympics and a silver medal at the 1998 Winter Olympics. Mantila also won five medals at the FIS Nordic World Ski Championships with one gold (4 x 5 km team: 1999), two silvers (15 km individual: 1995, 4 x 5 km team: 1997), and one bronze (4 x 5 km team: 2001).
