= Nordic combined at the 1998 Winter Olympics =

Nordic combined at the XVIII Olympic Winter Games
- Venue: Hakuba Ski Jumping Stadium (ski jumping); Snow Harp (cross-country skiing)
- Dates: 13–20 February 1998
- No. of events: 2
- Competitors: 53 from 14 nations

Nordic combined at the 1998 Winter Olympics, consisted of two events, held from 13 to 20 February. The ski jumping portion took place at Hakuba Ski Jumping Stadium, while the cross-country portion took place at Snow Harp.

== Medal summary ==
=== Medal table ===
| Rank | Nation | Gold | Silver | Bronze | Total |
|---|---|---|---|---|---|
| 1 | Norway | 2 | 0 | 0 | 2 |
| 2 | Finland | 0 | 2 | 0 | 2 |
| 3 | France | 0 | 0 | 1 | 1 |
| 3 | Russia | 0 | 0 | 1 | 1 |
| Totals (4 entries) | | 2 | 2 | 2 | 6 |

The Norwegians led the medal table, sweeping the two gold medals. Russia's medal, from Valery Stolyarov was the first, and as of 2026, only medal for Russia in Nordic combined (three Soviet athletes have won Nordic combined medals, two of them from Russia).

=== Events ===
| Event | Gold | | Silver | | Bronze | |
|---|---|---|---|---|---|---|
| Individual | Bjarte Engen Vik; Norway | 41:21.1 | Samppa Lajunen; Finland | 41:48.6 | Valery Stolyarov; Russia | 41:49.3 |
| Team | Norway; Fred Børre Lundberg; Kenneth Braaten; Halldor Skard; Bjarte Engen Vik | 54:11.5 | Finland; Jari Mantila; Hannu Manninen; Tapio Nurmela; Samppa Lajunen | 55:30.4 | France; Fabrice Guy; Nicolas Bal; Ludovic Roux; Sylvain Guillaume | 55:53.4 |

== Participating NOCs ==
Fourteen nations participated in Nordic combined at the Nagano Games. Slovenia made their Olympic Nordic combined debut.

- Austria (4)
- Belarus (2)
- Czech Republic (5)
- Estonia (4)
- Finland (4)
- France (4)
- Germany (5)
- Italy (1)
- Japan (5)
- Norway (5)
- Russia (5)
- Slovenia (1)
- Switzerland (4)
- United States (4)
