= Milan Kučera (Nordic combined) =

Milan Kučera (born 18 June 1974 in Jilemnice) is a Czech former Nordic combined skier who competed from 1991 to 2002. Competing in four Winter Olympics, his best finish was fifth in the 15 km individual event at Nagano in 1998.

Kučera's best finish at the FIS Nordic World Ski Championships was fourth in the 15 km individual at Thunder Bay, Ontario in 1995. His only World Cup victory was in a 15 km individual event in France in 1998.

He is son of another Czech skier Tomáš Kučera, who represented his country in the 1968 and 1972 Winter Olympics, also in the Nordic combined event.
