= Sylvain Guillaume =

French Nordic combined skier

Medal record

Men's Nordic combined

Olympic Games
Silver medal – second place	1992 Albertville	15 km individual
Bronze medal – third place	1998 Nagano	4 x 5 km team

World Championships
Bronze medal – third place	1995 Thunder Bay	15 km individual

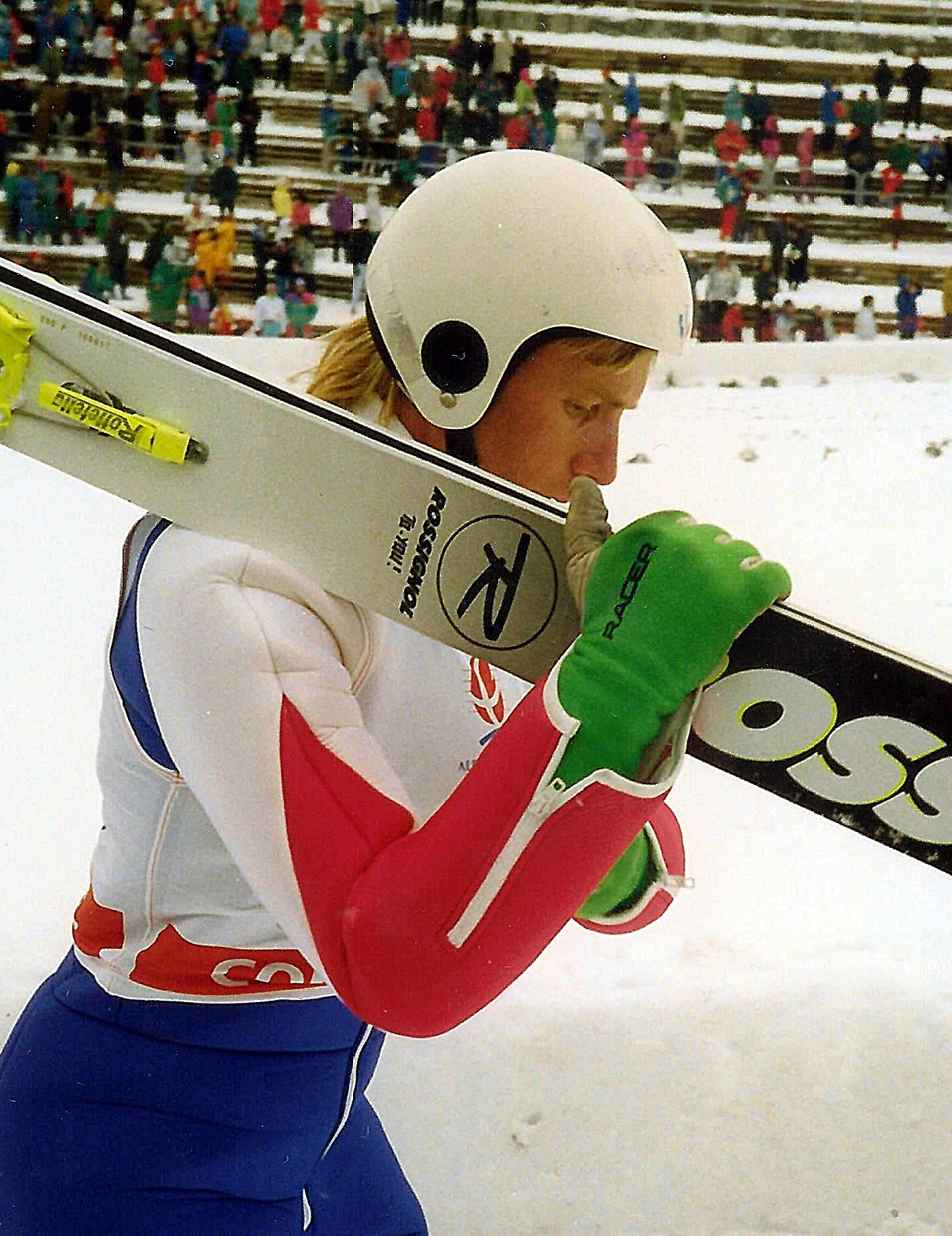
Sylvain Guillaume during the J.O. in Alberville, February 17, 1992.

Sylvain Guillaume (born 6 July 1968 in Champagnole, Jura) is a former French Nordic combined skier who competed during the 1990s. At the 1992 Winter Olympics in Albertville he won a silver in the 15 km individual, then a bronze in the 4 x 5 km team competition at the 1998 Winter Olympics in Nagano. He also won a bronze medal in the 15 km individual at the 1995 FIS Nordic World Ski Championships in Thunder Bay, Ontario.
