= Switzerland at the 1992 Winter Olympics =

- IOC code: SUI
- NOC: Swiss Olympic Association
- Website: www.swissolympic.ch (in German and French)

in Albertville, France 8–23 February 1992
- Competitors: 74 (57 men, 17 women) in 8 sports
- Flag bearers: Vreni Schneider, Alpine Skiing
- Medals Ranked 14th: Gold 1 Silver 0 Bronze 2 Total 3

Winter Olympics appearances (overview)
- 1924; 1928; 1932; 1936; 1948; 1952; 1956; 1960; 1964; 1968; 1972; 1976; 1980; 1984; 1988; 1992; 1994; 1998; 2002; 2006; 2010; 2014; 2018; 2022; 2026

Switzerland was represented at the 1992 Winter Olympics in Albertville, France by the Swiss Olympic Association.

In total, 74 athletes including 57 men and 17 woman represented Switzerland in eight different sports including alpine skiing, biathlon, bobsleigh, cross-country skiing, freestyle skiing, ice hockey, Nordic combined and ski jumping.

Switzerland won three medals, all in short track speed skating, at the games after Gustav Weder and Donat Acklin won gold in the two-man bobsleigh, Steve Locher won bronze in the alpine skiing men's combined and Gustav Weder, Donat Acklin, Lorenz Schindelholz and Curdin Morell won bronze in the four-man bobsleigh.

Nicolas Bochatay, a member of the delegation, was to represent the country in the demonstration speed skiing events. However, he was killed in an accident on the morning of the competition final.

== Competitors ==
In total, 74 athletes represented Switzzerland at the 1992 Winter Olympics in Albertville, France across eight different sports.

Sport	Men	Women	Total
Alpine skiing	11	10	21
Biathlon	1	0	1
Bobsleigh	8	–	8
Cross-country skiing	3	6	9
Freestyle skiing	4	1	5
Ice hockey	22	–	22
Nordic combined	4	–	4
Ski jumping	4	–	4
Total	57	17	74

== Medalists ==
Switzerland won a total of three medals at the games including one gold and two bronze.

Medal	Name	Sport	Event	Date
Gold	Gustav Weder; Donat Acklin	Bobsleigh	Two-man	16 February
Bronze	Steve Locher	Alpine skiing	Men's combined	11 February
Bronze	Gustav Weder; Donat Acklin; Lorenz Schindelholz; Curdin Morell	Bobsleigh	Four-man	22 February

== Alpine skiing ==
In total, 21 Swiss athletes participated in the alpine skiing events – Paul Accola, William Besse, Annick Bonzon, Chantal Bournissen, Xavier Gigandet, Michael von Grünigen, Zoë Haas, Marco Hangl, Franz Heinzer, Urs Kälin, Steve Locher, Daniel Mahrer, Katrin Neuenschwander, Hans Pieren, Corinne Rey-Bellet, Vreni Schneider, Marlis Spescha, Patrick Staub, Heidi Zeller-Bähler and Heidi Zurbriggen.

Men

Athlete	Event	Race 1	Race 2	Total	
Athlete	Event	Time	Time	Time	Rank
Paul Accola	Downhill			DNF	–
Xavier Gigandet	Downhill			1:52.50	15
Daniel Mahrer	Downhill			1:52.39	13
Franz Heinzer	Downhill			1:51.39	6
Franz Heinzer	Super-G			DNF	–
Urs Kälin	Super-G			1:15.22	14
Paul Accola	Super-G			1:14.60	10
Marco Hangl	Super-G			1:13.90	6
Michael von Grünigen	Giant Slalom	1:06.95	1:03.72	2:10.67	13
Hans Pieren	Giant Slalom	1:06.34	1:03.23	2:09.57	11
Steve Locher	Giant Slalom	1:05.80	DNF	DNF	–
Paul Accola	Giant Slalom	1:04.88	1:03.14	2:08.02	4
Steve Locher	Slalom	DNF	–	DNF	–
Michael von Grünigen	Slalom	53.62	52.80	1:46.42	7
Paul Accola	Slalom	52.64	52.98	1:45.62	6
Patrick Staub	Slalom	52.56	52.88	1:45.44	4

Athlete	Downhill	Slalom		Total	
Athlete	Time	Time 1	Time 2	Points	Rank
William Besse	1:46.66	DNF	–	DNF	–
Steve Locher	1:46.53	49.90	51.54	18.16	3rd place, bronze medalist(s)
Paul Accola	1:45.73	56.08	59.71	90.96	21
Xavier Gigandet	1:45.61	53.35	53.84	41.21	8

Women

Athlete	Event	Race 1	Race 2	Total	
Athlete	Event	Time	Time	Time	Rank
Chantal Bournissen	Downhill			DNF	–
Marlis Spescha	Downhill			1:55.83	21
Heidi Zeller-Bähler	Downhill			1:54.73	13
Heidi Zurbriggen	Downhill			1:54.04	10
Heidi Zurbriggen	Super-G			DNF	–
Chantal Bournissen	Super-G			DNF	–
Heidi Zeller-Bähler	Super-G			1:24.51	11
Zoë Haas	Super-G			1:24.31	10
Heidi Zurbriggen	Giant Slalom	DSQ	–	DSQ	–
Vreni Schneider	Giant Slalom	DNF	–	DNF	–
Corinne Rey-Bellet	Giant Slalom	1:08.89	1:08.70	2:17.59	17
Zoë Haas	Giant Slalom	1:07.77	1:10.12	2:17.89	18
Annick Bonzon	Slalom	49.94	DNF	DNF	–
Christine von Grünigen	Slalom	49.84	45.89	1:35.73	13
Katrin Neuenschwander	Slalom	49.20	45.08	1:34.28	9
Vreni Schneider	Slalom	48.66	45.30	1:33.96	7

Athlete	Downhill	Slalom		Total	
Athlete	Time	Time 1	Time 2	Points	Rank
Heidi Zurbriggen	DSQ	–	–	DSQ	–
Chantal Bournissen	1:26.92	35.33	35.36	24.98	4
Heidi Zeller-Bähler	1:26.90	37.63	38.45	69.07	14

== Biathlon ==
In total, one Swiss athlete participated in the biathlon events – Jean-Marc Chabloz.

Men

Event	Athlete	Misses ^{1}	Time	Rank
10 km Sprint	Jean-Marc Chabloz	3	30:32.9	77

Event	Athlete	Time	Misses	Adjusted time ^{2}	Rank
20 km	Jean-Marc Chabloz	59:45.6	4	1'03:45.6	54

^{1} A penalty loop of 150 metres had to be skied per missed target.
^{2} One minute added per missed target.

== Bobsleigh ==
In total, eight Swiss athletes participated in the bobsleigh events – Donat Acklin, Bruno Gerber, Gerold Löffler, Christian Meili, Curdin Morell, Christian Reich, Lorenz Schindelholz and Gustav Weder.

Sled	Athletes	Event	Run 1		Run 2		Run 3		Run 4		Total	
Sled	Athletes	Event	Time	Rank	Time	Rank	Time	Rank	Time	Rank	Time	Rank
SUI-1	Gustav Weder; Donat Acklin	Two-man	1:00.49	9	1:00.97	3	1:00.84	1	1:00.96	1	4:03.26	1st place, gold medalist(s)
SUI-2	Christian Meili; Christian Reich	Two-man	1:00.23	3	1:01.31	11	1:01.44	9	1:01.38	10	4:04.36	10

Sled	Athletes	Event	Run 1		Run 2		Run 3		Run 4		Total	
Sled	Athletes	Event	Time	Rank	Time	Rank	Time	Rank	Time	Rank	Time	Rank
SUI-1	Gustav Weder; Donat Acklin; Lorenz Schindelholz; Curdin Morell	Four-man	57.97	2	58.78	6	58.59	3	58.79	3	3:54.13	3rd place, bronze medalist(s)
SUI-2	Christian Meili; Bruno Gerber; Christian Reich; Gerold Löffler	Four-man	58.15	5	58.75	5	58.59	3	58.89	8	3:54.38	5

== Cross-country skiing ==
In total, nine Swiss athletes participated in the cross-country skiing events – Brigitte Albrecht, Silke Schwager, Natascia Leonardi, Hans Diethelm, Giachem Guidon, Sylvia Honegger, André Jungen, Elvira Knecht and Barbara Mettler.

Men

Event	Athlete	Race	
Event	Athlete	Time	Rank
10 km C	Hans Diethelm	31:41.8	50
10 km C	André Jungen	31:41.2	49
10 km C	Giachem Guidon	31:23.9	44
15 km pursuit^{1} F	Hans Diethelm	44:16.4	44
15 km pursuit^{1} F	Giachem Guidon	43:06.1	34
15 km pursuit^{1} F	André Jungen	42:56.3	31
30 km C	Hans Diethelm	1'30:13.2	36
30 km C	Giachem Guidon	1'28:44.5	25
50 km F	André Jungen	2'20:32.1	47
50 km F	Hans Diethelm	2'14:41.6	30
50 km F	Giachem Guidon	2'10:55.0	15

^{1} Starting delay based on 10 km results.
C = Classical style, F = Freestyle

Women

Event	Athlete	Race	
Event	Athlete	Time	Rank
5 km C	Elvira Knecht	16:05.5	44
5 km C	Barbara Mettler	15:33.7	32
5 km C	Brigitte Albrecht	15:09.5	20
5 km C	Sylvia Honegger	15:03.4	15
10 km pursuit^{2} F	Barbara Mettler	31:16.3	42
10 km pursuit^{2} F	Brigitte Albrecht	30:28.8	37
10 km pursuit^{2} F	Elvira Knecht	30:17.2	36
10 km pursuit^{2} F	Sylvia Honegger	28:17.7	13
15 km C	Silke Schwager	DNF	–
15 km C	Natascia Leonardi	46:32.7	25
15 km C	Sylvia Honegger	45:33.7	16
30 km F	Natascia Leonardi	1'33:21.0	31
30 km F	Elvira Knecht	1'32:35.6	26
30 km F	Sylvia Honegger	1'30:16.6	19
30 km F	Brigitte Albrecht	1'29:54.3	17

^{2} Starting delay based on 5 km results.
C = Classical style, F = Freestyle

Women's 4 × 5 km relay

Athletes	Race	
Athletes	Time	Rank
Sylvia Honegger; Brigitte Albrecht; Natascia Leonardi; Elvira Knecht	1'02:54.1	9

== Freestyle skiing ==
In total, five Swiss athletes participated in the freestyle skiing events – Jürg Biner, Bernard Brandt, Conny Kissling, Thomas Lagler and Petsch Moser.

Men

Athlete	Event	Qualification			Final		
Athlete	Event	Time	Points	Rank	Time	Points	Rank
Bernard Brandt	Moguls	35.58	14.82	39	did not advance		
Petsch Moser	Moguls	31.06	18.56	29	did not advance		
Thomas Lagler	Moguls	32.63	22.02	17	did not advance		
Jürg Biner	Moguls	32.00	23.02	11 Q	32.60	22.69	10

Women

Athlete	Event	Qualification			Final		
Athlete	Event	Time	Points	Rank	Time	Points	Rank
Conny Kissling	Moguls	40.83	17.46	13	did not advance		

== Ice hockey ==
In total, 22 Swiss athletes participated in the ice hockey events – Samuel Balmer, Sandro Bertaggia, Andreas Beutler, Patrice Brasey, Mario Brodmann, Manuele Celio, Jörg Eberle, Keith Fair, Doug Honegger, Patrick Howald, Peter Jaks, Dino Kessler, André Künzi, Sven Leuenberger, Alfred Lüthi, Gil Montandon, Reto Pavoni, André Rötheli, Mario Rottaris, Andreas Ton, Renato Tosio and Thomas Vrabec.

=== Group B ===
Twelve participating teams were placed in two groups. After playing a round-robin, the top four teams in each group advanced to the Medal Round while the last two teams competed in the consolation round for the 9th to 12th places.

Team advanced to the Final Round
Team sent to compete in the Consolation round

Team	GP	W	L	T	GF	GA	DIF	PTS
Canada	5	4	1	0	28	9	19	8
Unified Team	5	4	1	0	32	10	22	8
Czechoslovakia	5	4	1	0	25	15	10	8
France	5	2	3	0	14	22	-8	4
Switzerland	5	1	4	0	13	25	-12	2
Norway	5	0	5	0	7	38	-31	0

Unified Team	8:1	Switzerland
Canada	6:1	Switzerland
France	4:3	Switzerland
Switzerland	6:3	Norway
Czechoslovakia	4:2	Switzerland

=== Consolation round 9th-12th places ===
Switzerland	7:2	Poland

9th-place match

Norway	5:2	Switzerland 10th

== Nordic combined ==
In total, four Swiss athletes participated in the Nordic combined events – Hippolyt Kempf, Urs Niedhart, Andreas Schaad and Marco Zarucchi.

Men's individual

Events:

- normal hill ski jumping (Best two out of three jumps.)
- 15 km cross-country skiing (Start delay, based on ski jumping results.)

Athlete	Event	Ski Jumping		Cross-country		Total
Athlete	Event	Points	Rank	Start at	Time	Rank
Urs Niedhart	Individual	179.3	41	+5:28.0	54:07.4	38
Hippolyt Kempf	Individual	189.7	36	+4:18.7	50:24.5	26
Marco Zarucchi	Individual	201.1	20	+3:02.7	50:55.3	29
Andreas Schaad	Individual	201.1	20	+3:02.7	48:02.1	14

Men's Team

Events:

- normal hill ski jumping (Best two out of three jumps per team member were counted.)
- 10 km cross-country skiing (Start delay, based on ski jumping results.)

Athletes	Ski jumping		Cross-country		Total
Athletes	Points	Rank	Start at	Time	Rank
Hippolyt Kempf; Andreas Schaad; Marco Zarucchi	521.9	11	+10:16.0	1'33:38.4	10

== Ski jumping ==
In total, four Swiss athletes participated in the ski jumping events – Sylvain Freiholz, Markus Gähler, Martin Trunz and Stefan Zünd.

Athlete	Event	Jump 1		Jump 2		Total	
Athlete	Event	Distance	Points	Distance	Points	Points	Rank
Markus Gähler	Normal hill	80.5	90.8	79.0	89.4	180.2	44
Martin Trunz	Normal hill	80.0	92.0	80.5	90.8	182.8	41
Sylvain Freiholz	Normal hill	83.0	97.8	81.5	93.4	191.2	24
Stefan Zünd	Normal hill	83.0	100.8	80.0	94.0	194.8	20
Markus Gähler	Large hill	100.0	77.0	90.5	61.7	138.7	35
Sylvain Freiholz	Large hill	99.0	77.6	108.5	93.4	171.0	14
Martin Trunz	Large hill	105.0	87.0	88.5	60.4	147.4	31
Stefan Zünd	Large hill	104.0	87.1	94.5	71.8	158.9	22

Men's team large hill

Athletes	Result	
Athletes	Points ^{1}	Rank
Markus Gähler; Stefan Zünd; Sylvain Freiholz; Martin Trunz	537.9	8

^{1} Four teams members performed two jumps each. The best three were counted.

== Speed skiing incident ==
Speed skiing was a demonstration sport at the 1992 Winter Olympics. A men's individual and a women's individual event were held. On 22 February 1992, during a warm-up for the men's individual final, Swiss skier Nicolas Bochatay became airborne over a bump and was killed in a crash with a Snowcat ski grooming machine. Bochatay was not the only fatality as a course official was struck and killed by a skier during a training run. Speed skiing has never been a part of the Winter Olympics since.
