= Nordic combined at the 1992 Winter Olympics – Individual =

Individual at the XVI Olympic Winter Games
- Pictogram for Nordic combined
- Venue: Courchevel (ski jumping); Les Saisies (cross-country skiing)
- Dates: 11–12 February
- Competitors: 45 from 12 nations
- Winning time: 44:28.1

Medalists
1st place, gold medalist(s)		Fabrice Guy	France
2nd place, silver medalist(s)		Sylvain Guillaume	France
3rd place, bronze medalist(s)		Klaus Sulzenbacher	Austria

The men's individual Nordic combined competition for the 1992 Winter Olympics in Albertville at Courchevel and Les Saisies on 11 and 12 February.

== Results ==
=== Ski Jumping ===
Athletes did three normal hill ski jumps, with the lowest score dropped. The combined points earned on the jumps determined the starting order and times for the cross-country race; each three points was equal to a 20 second deficit.

Rank	Name	Country	Jump 1	Jump 2	Jump 3	Points	Time Difference
1	Klaus Ofner	Austria	~~111.6~~	113.0	115.5	228.5	+0:00.0
2	Reiichi Mikata	Japan	~~108.5~~	111.1	115.0	226.1	+0:16.0
3	Fabrice Guy	France	115.5	~~101.1~~	106.6	222.1	+0:42.6
4	Klaus Sulzenbacher	Austria	110.8	110.8	~~108.9~~	221.6	+0:46.0
5	Jari Mantila	Finland	107.3	~~102.9~~	109.4	216.7	+1:18.6
6	Kenji Ogiwara	Japan	110.9	104.4	~~84.9~~	215.3	+1:27.9
7	Stefan Kreiner	Austria	~~98.4~~	106.2	108.6	214.8	+1:31.2
8	Hans-Peter Pohl	Germany	107.7	104.8	~~103.2~~	212.5	+1:46.5
9	Fred Børre Lundberg	Norway	~~103.5~~	106.1	105.8	211.9	+1:50.5
10	Thomas Dufter	Germany	~~100.8~~	104.6	106.2	210.8	+1:57.8
11	Andrey Dundukov	Unified Team	~~92.7~~	106.4	104.0	210.4	+2:00.5
12	Teemu Summanen	Finland	~~95.7~~	105.3	103.0	208.3	+2:14.5
13	Sylvain Guillaume	France	~~97.2~~	106.2	101.9	208.1	+2:15.8
14	Allar Levandi	Estonia	~~101.7~~	102.7	103.7	206.4	+2:27.1
15	Joe Holland	United States	~~93.8~~	98.6	107.7	206.3	+2:27.8
16	Sergey Shvagirev	Unified Team	~~97.5~~	102.0	103.0	205.0	+2:36.4
17	Milan Kučera	Czechoslovakia	97.3	107.7	~~96.1~~	205.0	+2:36.4
18	Stanisław Ustupski	Poland	102.0	100.6	~~96.5~~	202.6	+2:52.4
19	Francis Reppelin	France	~~95.6~~	100.8	101.1	201.9	+2:57.1
20	Andreas Schaad	Switzerland	~~97.3~~	103.0	98.1	201.1	+3:02.4
21	Marco Zarucchi	Switzerland	~~95.0~~	97.8	103.3	201.1	+3:02.4
22	Xavier Girard	France	~~84.5~~	100.7	98.6	199.3	+3:14.4
23	Ago Markvardt	Estonia	~~91.2~~	99.0	100.0	199.0	+3:16.4
24	Masashi Abe	Japan	100.4	97.5	~~96.8~~	197.9	+3:23.7
25	Takanori Kono	Japan	~~64.3~~	93.6	103.8	197.4	+3:27.0
26	Sven Leonhardt	Germany	~~89.7~~	96.5	100.7	197.2	+3:28.4
27	František Máka	Czechoslovakia	~~96.4~~	100.7	~~96.4~~	197.1	+3:29.0
28	Ryan Heckman	United States	96.8	99.6	~~95.0~~	196.4	+3:33.7
29	Tim Tetreault	United States	~~96.4~~	96.6	98.9	195.5	+3:39.7
30	Josef Kovařík	Czechoslovakia	96.9	96.4	~~94.8~~	193.3	+3:54.3
31	Günther Csar	Austria	~~92.5~~	100.3	93.0	193.3	+3:54.3
32	Valery Stolyarov	Unified Team	88.8	103.2	~~85.9~~	192.0	+4:03.0
33	Stefan Habas	Poland	93.8	~~89.4~~	98.0	191.8	+4:04.3
34	Pasi Saapunki	Finland	~~92.6~~	93.3	97.8	191.1	+4:08.9
35	Knut Tore Apeland	Norway	~~91.7~~	94.3	96.4	190.7	+4:11.6
36	Hippolyt Kempf	Switzerland	92.6	~~77.3~~	97.1	189.7	+4:18.3
37	Martin Bayer	Czechoslovakia	97.0	91.2	~~88.3~~	188.2	+4:28.2
38	Peter Heli	Estonia	89.4	92.6	~~89.1~~	182.0	+5:09.5
39	Trond Einar Elden	Norway	88.9	93.0	~~87.9~~	181.9	+5:10.2
40	Vasily Savin	Unified Team	~~87.1~~	91.0	88.4	179.4	+5:26.8
41	Urs Niedhart	Switzerland	~~82.9~~	84.6	94.7	179.3	+5:27.5
42	Sami Kallunki	Finland	87.6	~~83.1~~	89.9	177.5	+5:39.5
43	Todd Wilson	United States	84.7	~~78.7~~	92.0	176.7	+5:44.8
44	Toomas Tiru	Estonia	~~80.6~~	83.2	87.7	170.9	+6:23.4
45	Bård Jørgen Elden	Norway	~~77.0~~	88.1	79.6	167.7	+6:44.7

=== Cross-Country ===
The cross-country race was over a distance of 15 kilometres.

Rank	Name	Country	Start time	Cross-country		Finish time
Rank	Name	Country	Start time	Time	Place	Finish time
1st place, gold medalist(s)	Fabrice Guy	France	+0:42.7	43:45.4	6	44:28.1
2nd place, silver medalist(s)	Sylvain Guillaume	France	+2:16.0	43:00.5	3	45:16.5
3rd place, bronze medalist(s)	Klaus Sulzenbacher	Austria	+0:46.0	44:48.4	13	45:34.4
4	Fred Børre Lundberg	Norway	+1:50.7	44:04.1	9	45:54.8
5	Klaus Ofner	Austria	+0:00.0	45:57.9	21	45:57.9
6	Allar Levandi	Estonia	+2:27.4	43:34.8	5	46:02.2
7	Kenji Ogiwara	Japan	+1:28.0	44:57.5	16	46:25.5
8	Stanisław Ustupski	Poland	+2:52.7	44:03.5	8	46:56.2
9	Trond Einar Elden	Norway	+5:10.7	42:01.2	1	47:11.9
10	Knut Tore Apeland	Norway	+4:12.0	43:11.9	4	47:23.9
11	Andrey Dundukov	Unified Team	+2:00.7	45:43.5	19	47:44.2
12	Thomas Dufter	Germany	+1:58.0	45:54.9	20	47:52.9
13	Xavier Girard	France	+3:14.7	44:47.3	12	48:02.0
14	Andreas Schaad	Switzerland	+3:02.7	44:59.4	17	48:02.1
15	František Máka	Czechoslovakia	+3:29.4	44:33.4	10	48:02.8
16	Hans-Peter Pohl	Germany	+1:46.7	46:55.0	26	48:41.7
17	Stefan Kreiner	Austria	+1:31.4	47:10.4	27	48:41.8
17	Josef Kovařík	Czechoslovakia	+3:54.7	44:47.1	11	48:41.8
19	Takanori Kono	Japan	+3:27.4	45:18.9	18	48:46.3
20	Pasi Saapunki	Finland	+4:09.4	44:54.0	15	49:03.4
21	Bård Jørgen Elden	Norway	+6:45.3	42:32.1	2	49:17.4
22	Vasily Savin	Unified Team	+5:27.4	43:57.4	7	49:24.8
23	Ago Markvardt	Estonia	+3:16.7	46:21.9	25	49:38.6
24	Teemu Summanen	Finland	+2:14.7	47:44.7	31	49:59.4
25	Stefan Habas	Poland	+4:04.7	46:13.4	23	50:18.1
26	Hippolyt Kempf	Switzerland	+4:18.7	46:05.8	22	50:24.5
27	Francis Reppelin	France	+2:57.4	47:31.0	28	50:28.4
28	Sami Kallunki	Finland	+5:40.0	44:49.7	14	50:29.7
29	Marco Zarucchi	Switzerland	+3:02.7	47:52.6	33	50:55.3
30	Masashi Abe	Japan	+3:24.0	47:44.5	30	51:08.5
31	Peter Heli	Estonia	+5:10.0	46:15.1	24	51:25.1
32	Günther Csar	Austria	+3:54.7	47:34.0	29	51:28.7
33	Valery Stolyarov	Unified Team	+4:03.4	47:46.8	32	51:50.2
34	Reiichi Mikata	Japan	+0:16.0	51:53.1	42	52:09.1
35	Sven Leonhardt	Germany	+3:28.7	48:59.9	36	52:28.6
36	Sergey Shvagirev	Unified Team	+2:36.7	50:26.9	39	53:03.6
37	Ryan Heckman	United States	+3:34.0	50:07.9	37	53:41.9
38	Urs Niedhart	Switzerland	+5:28.0	48:39.4	35	54:07.4
39	Todd Wilson	United States	+5:45.3	48:36.7	34	54:22.0
40	Tim Tetreault	United States	+3:40.0	51:09.6	41	54:49.6
41	Martin Bayer	Czechoslovakia	+4:28.7	50:42.5	40	55:11.2
42	Toomas Tiru	Estonia	+6:24.0	50:13.1	38	56:37.1
-	Jari Mantila	Finland	+1:18.7	DNF	-	-
-	Joe Holland	United States	+2:28.0	DNF	-	-
-	Milan Kučera	Czechoslovakia	+2:36.7	DNF	-	-
