= Switzerland at the 1994 Winter Olympics =

- IOC code: SUI
- NOC: Swiss Olympic Association
- Website: www.swissolympic.ch (in German and French)

in Lillehammer
- Competitors: 59 (41 men, 18 women) in 10 sports
- Flag bearer: Gustav Weder (bobsleigh)
- Medals Ranked 8th: Gold 3 Silver 4 Bronze 2 Total 9

Winter Olympics appearances (overview)
- 1924; 1928; 1932; 1936; 1948; 1952; 1956; 1960; 1964; 1968; 1972; 1976; 1980; 1984; 1988; 1992; 1994; 1998; 2002; 2006; 2010; 2014; 2018; 2022; 2026

Switzerland competed at the 1994 Winter Olympics in Lillehammer, Norway.

== Medalists ==
Medal	Name	Sport	Event	Date
Gold	Gustav Weder; Donat Acklin	Bobsleigh	Two-man	20 February
Gold	Andreas Schönbächler	Freestyle skiing	Men's aerials	24 February
Gold	Vreni Schneider	Alpine skiing	Women's slalom	26 February
Silver	Reto Götschi; Guido Acklin	Bobsleigh	Two-man	20 February
Silver	Vreni Schneider	Alpine skiing	Women's combined	21 February
Silver	Urs Kälin	Alpine skiing	Men's giant slalom	23 February
Silver	Gustav Weder; Donat Acklin; Kurt Meier; Domenico Semeraro	Bobsleigh	Four-man	27 February
Bronze	Jean-Yves Cuendet; Hippolyt Kempf; Andreas Schaad	Nordic combined	Team	24 February
Bronze	Vreni Schneider	Alpine skiing	Women's giant slalom	24 February

== Competitors ==
The following is the list of number of competitors in the Games.

Sport	Men	Women	Total
Alpine skiing	11	9	20
Biathlon	3	0	3
Bobsleigh	10	–	10
Cross-country skiing	5	5	10
Figure skating	0	1	1
Freestyle skiing	3	3	6
Luge	1	0	1
Nordic combined	4	–	4
Ski jumping	2	–	2
Speed skating	1	0	1
Total	40	19	59

== Alpine skiing ==
Men

Athlete	Event	Race 1	Race 2	Total	
Athlete	Event	Time	Time	Time	Rank
Franz Heinzer	Downhill			DNF	–
Franco Cavegn	Downhill			1:47.15	23
William Besse	Downhill			1:46.76	16
Daniel Mahrer	Downhill			1:46.55	14
William Besse	Super-G			DNF	–
Daniel Mahrer	Super-G			DNF	–
Paul Accola	Super-G			1:34.37	14
Marco Hangl	Super-G			1:33.75	10
Steve Locher	Giant Slalom	DNF	–	DNF	–
Michael von Grünigen	Giant Slalom	DNF	–	DNF	–
Paul Accola	Giant Slalom	1:30.21	1:24.75	2:54.96	19
Urs Kälin	Giant Slalom	1:28.70	1:23.78	2:52.48	2nd place, silver medalist(s)
Paul Accola	Slalom	1:04.45	1:03.11	2:07.56	17
Michael von Grünigen	Slalom	1:03.94	1:01.94	2:05.88	15
Andrea Zinsli	Slalom	1:02.87	1:02.07	2:04.94	11
Patrick Staub	Slalom	1:02.46	1:01.73	2:04.19	9

Men's combined

Athlete	Downhill	Slalom		Total	
Athlete	Time	Time 1	Time 2	Total time	Rank
Paul Accola	1:39.41	50.75	49.28	3:19.44	6
Steve Locher	1:39.34	52.57	49.30	3:21.21	12
Marcel Sulliger	1:39.30	53.61	51.09	3:24.00	17

Women

Athlete	Event	Race 1	Race 2	Total	
Athlete	Event	Time	Time	Time	Rank
Vreni Schneider	Downhill			1:39.35	33
Heidi Zeller-Bähler	Downhill			1:38.78	28
Heidi Zurbriggen	Downhill			1:38.46	22
Chantal Bournissen	Super-G			DNF	–
Heidi Zurbriggen	Super-G			DNF	–
Heidi Zeller-Bähler	Super-G			1:23.53	16
Karin Roten	Giant Slalom	1:23.22	1:13.33	2:36.55	16
Heidi Zeller-Bähler	Giant Slalom	1:23.14	1:12.00	2:35.14	9
Corinne Rey-Bellet	Giant Slalom	1:21.71	DNF	–	–
Vreni Schneider	Giant Slalom	1:21.29	1:11.68	2:32.97	3rd place, bronze medalist(s)
Christine von Grünigen	Slalom	1:00.76	57.10	1:57.86	6
Martina Accola	Slalom	1:00.45	59.58	2:00.03	17
Vreni Schneider	Slalom	59.68	56.33	1:56.01	1st place, gold medalist(s)
Gabi Zingre	Slalom	59.62	58.18	1:57.80	5

Women's combined

Athlete	Downhill	Slalom		Total	
Athlete	Time	Time 1	Time 2	Total time	Rank
Vreni Schneider	1:28.91	49.75	46.63	3:05.29	2nd place, silver medalist(s)

== Biathlon ==
Men

Event	Athlete	Misses ^{1}	Time	Rank
10 km Sprint	Daniel Hediger	8	33:05.6	63
10 km Sprint	Jean-Marc Chabloz	3	32:35.6	60

Event	Athlete	Time	Misses	Adjusted time ^{2}	Rank
20 km	Jean-Marc Chabloz	58:27.9	4	1'02:27.9	45
20 km	Hanspeter Knobel	1'00:42.8	1	1'01:42.8	33

^{1} A penalty loop of 150 metres had to be skied per missed target.
^{2} One minute added per missed target.

== Bobsleigh ==
Sled	Athletes	Event	Run 1		Run 2		Run 3		Run 4		Total	
Sled	Athletes	Event	Time	Rank	Time	Rank	Time	Rank	Time	Rank	Time	Rank
SUI-1	Gustav Weder; Donat Acklin	Two-man	52.33	1	52.91	3	52.72	2	52.85	1	3:30.81	1st place, gold medalist(s)
SUI-2	Reto Götschi; Guido Acklin	Two-man	52.38	2	52.76	1	52.79	4	52.93	3	3:30.86	2nd place, silver medalist(s)

Sled	Athletes	Event	Run 1		Run 2		Run 3		Run 4		Total	
Sled	Athletes	Event	Time	Rank	Time	Rank	Time	Rank	Time	Rank	Time	Rank
SUI-1	Gustav Weder; Donat Acklin; Kurt Meier; Domenico Semeraro	Four-man	51.80	4	51.87	1	52.04	1	52.13	1	3:27.84	2nd place, silver medalist(s)
SUI-2	Christian Meili; René Schmidheiny; Gerold Löffler; Christian Reich	Four-man	51.98	7	52.16	5	52.58	15	52.61	14	3:29.33	7

== Cross-country skiing ==
Men

Event	Athlete	Race	
Event	Athlete	Time	Rank
10 km C	Wilhelm Aschwanden	27:27.2	60
10 km C	Giachem Guidon	27:09.1	48
10 km C	Hans Diethelm	27:03.1	46
10 km C	Jeremias Wigger	25:55.4	22
15 km pursuit^{1} F	Wilhelm Aschwanden	43:57.4	56
15 km pursuit^{1} F	Hans Diethelm	41:12.4	30
15 km pursuit^{1} F	Jeremias Wigger	38:47.9	13
30 km F	Jürg Capol	1'22:59.9	49
30 km F	Giachem Guidon	1'22:21.0	46
50 km C	Giachem Guidon	DNF	–
50 km C	Jürg Capol	2'21:48.3	44
50 km C	Hans Diethelm	2'21:01.8	41
50 km C	Jeremias Wigger	2'13:40.2	16

^{1} Starting delay based on 10 km results.
C = Classical style, F = Freestyle

Men's 4 × 10 km relay

Athletes	Race	
Athletes	Time	Rank
Jeremias Wigger; Hans Diethelm; Jürg Capol; Giachem Guidon	1'47:12.2	7

Women

Event	Athlete	Race	
Event	Athlete	Time	Rank
5 km C	Jasmin Baumann	17:00.3	60
5 km C	Silke Schwager	16:11.2	42
5 km C	Barbara Mettler	15:59.6	37
5 km C	Sylvia Honegger	15:21.7	20
10 km pursuit^{2} F	Jasmin Baumann	35:01.2	51
10 km pursuit^{2} F	Silke Schwager	33:10.1	39
10 km pursuit^{2} F	Barbara Mettler	31:08.3	23
10 km pursuit^{2} F	Sylvia Honegger	29:30.9	11
15 km F	Brigitte Albrecht	46:11.9	38
15 km F	Barbara Mettler	45:26.9	30
15 km F	Sylvia Honegger	44:41.9	21
30 km C	Barbara Mettler	1'36:40.8	41
30 km C	Brigitte Albrecht	1'34:55.3	37
30 km C	Silke Schwager	1'34:07.4	33
30 km C	Sylvia Honegger	1'31:11.6	19

^{2} Starting delay based on 5 km results.
C = Classical style, F = Freestyle

Women's 4 × 5 km relay

Athletes	Race	
Athletes	Time	Rank
Sylvia Honegger; Silke Schwager; Barbara Mettler; Brigitte Albrecht	1'00:05.1	5

== Figure skating ==
Women

Athlete	SP	FS	TFP	Rank
Nathalie Krieg	15	17	24.5	16

== Freestyle skiing ==
Men

Athlete	Event	Qualification			Final		
Athlete	Event	Time	Points	Rank	Time	Points	Rank
Jürg Biner	Moguls	24.19	24.30	17	did not advance		
Herbert Kolly	Aerials		129.10	22	did not advance		
Andreas Schönbächler	Aerials		196.53	10 Q		234.67	1st place, gold medalist(s)

Women

Athlete	Event	Qualification			Final		
Athlete	Event	Time	Points	Rank	Time	Points	Rank
Sandrine Vaucher	Moguls	32.45	21.99	18	did not advance		
Colette Brand	Aerials		140.42	15	did not advance		
Maja Schmid	Aerials		149.08	7 Q		156.90	4

== Luge ==
Men

Athlete	Run 1		Run 2		Run 3		Run 4		Total	
Athlete	Time	Rank	Time	Rank	Time	Rank	Time	Rank	Time	Rank
Reto Gilly	52.740	31	52.555	29	52.696	30	52.436	28	3:30.427	29

== Nordic combined ==
Men's individual

Events:

- normal hill ski jumping
- 15 km cross-country skiing (Start delay, based on ski jumping results.)

Athlete	Event	Ski Jumping		Cross-country time	Total rank
Athlete	Event	Points	Rank	Cross-country time	Total rank
Markus Wüst	Individual	167.5	46	52:26.7	46
Andreas Schaad	Individual	198.0	20	45:04.1	15
Hippolyt Kempf	Individual	216.5	9	42:53.2	6
Jean-Yves Cuendet	Individual	222.0	7	43:03.5	7

Men's Team

Three participants per team.

Events:

- normal hill ski jumping
- 10 km cross-country skiing (Start delay, based on ski jumping results.)

Athletes	Ski jumping		Cross-country time	Total rank
Athletes	Points	Rank	Cross-country time	Total rank
Jean-Yves Cuendet; Andreas Schaad; Hippolyt Kempf	643.5	3	1'30:39.9	3rd place, bronze medalist(s)

== Ski jumping ==
Athlete	Event	Jump 1		Jump 2		Total	
Athlete	Event	Distance	Points	Distance	Points	Points	Rank
Martin Trunz	Normal hill	88.5	112.5	68.5	62.5	175.0	40
Sylvain Freiholz	Normal hill	94.0	121.5	79.5	91.5	213.0	25
Martin Trunz	Large hill	77.0	27.6	89.0	56.7	84.3	51
Sylvain Freiholz	Large hill	97.0	72.6	91.5	61.7	134.3	36

== Speed skating ==
Men

Event	Athlete	Race	
Event	Athlete	Time	Rank
5000 m	Martin Feigenwinter	7:02.12	28

== Sources ==
- Official Olympic Reports
- International Olympic Committee results database
- Olympic Winter Games 1994, full results by sports-reference.com
