= Finland at the 1992 Winter Olympics =

- IOC code: FIN
- NOC: Finnish Olympic Committee
- Website: sport.fi/olympiakomitea (in Finnish and Swedish)

in Albertville
- Competitors: 62 (49 men, 13 women) in 8 sports
- Flag bearers: Timo Blomqvist, ice hockey
- Medals Ranked 8th: Gold 3 Silver 1 Bronze 3 Total 7

Winter Olympics appearances (overview)
- 1924; 1928; 1932; 1936; 1948; 1952; 1956; 1960; 1964; 1968; 1972; 1976; 1980; 1984; 1988; 1992; 1994; 1998; 2002; 2006; 2010; 2014; 2018; 2022; 2026

Finland competed at the 1992 Winter Olympics in Albertville, France.

== Medalists ==
| Medal | Name | Sport | Event | Date |
|---|---|---|---|---|
| Gold | Marjut Lukkarinen | Cross-country skiing | Women's 5 kilometre classical | 13 February |
| Gold | Risto Laakkonen; Mika Laitinen; Toni Nieminen; Ari-Pekka Nikkola | Ski jumping | Large hill team | 14 February |
| Gold | Toni Nieminen | Ski jumping | Large hill individual | 16 February |
| Silver | Marjut Lukkarinen | Cross-country skiing | Women's 15 kilometre classical | 9 February |
| Bronze | Toni Nieminen | Ski jumping | Normal hill individual | 9 February |
| Bronze | Harri Eloranta | Biathlon | Men's sprint | 12 February |
| Bronze | Jari Isometsä; Harri Kirvesniemi; Mika Kuusisto; Jari Räsänen | Cross-country skiing | Men's 4 × 10 kilometre relay | 18 February |

== Competitors ==
The following is the list of number of competitors in the Games.

| Sport | Men | Women | Total |
|---|---|---|---|
| Biathlon | 5 | 4 | 9 |
| Cross-country skiing | 7 | 7 | 14 |
| Figure skating | 2 | 1 | 3 |
| Freestyle skiing | 3 | 1 | 4 |
| Ice hockey | 22 | – | 22 |
| Nordic combined | 4 | – | 4 |
| Ski jumping | 4 | – | 4 |
| Speed skating | 2 | 0 | 2 |
| Total | 49 | 13 | 62 |

== Biathlon ==
Men

| Event | Athlete | Misses ^{1} | Time | Rank |
|---|---|---|---|---|
| 10 km Sprint | Jaakko Niemi | 2 | 29:04.0 | 57 |
| 10 km Sprint | Kari Kataja | 1 | 27:46.5 | 27 |
| 10 km Sprint | Vesa Hietalahti | 2 | 27:25.1 | 17 |
| 10 km Sprint | Harri Eloranta | 0 | 26:26.6 | 3rd place, bronze medalist(s) |

| Event | Athlete | Time | Misses | Adjusted time ^{2} | Rank |
|---|---|---|---|---|---|
| 20 km | Kari Kataja | DNF | – | DNF | – |
| 20 km | Seppo Suhonen | 59:21.3 | 8 | 1'07:21.3 | 74 |
| 20 km | Vesa Hietalahti | 57:24.6 | 1 | 58:24.6 | 6 |
| 20 km | Harri Eloranta | 57:15.7 | 1 | 58:15.7 | 5 |

Men's 4 x 7.5 km relay

| Athletes | Race | | |
| Athletes | Misses ^{1} | Time | Rank |
|---|---|---|---|
| Vesa Hietalahti; Jaakko Niemi; Harri Eloranta; Kari Kataja | 1 | 1'27:39.5 | 8 |

Women

| Event | Athlete | Misses ^{1} | Time | Rank |
|---|---|---|---|---|
| 7.5 km Sprint | Johanna Saarinen | 4 | 28:48.6 | 53 |
| 7.5 km Sprint | Tuija Sikiö | 2 | 28:21.4 | 45 |
| 7.5 km Sprint | Mari Lampinen | 3 | 27:46.1 | 34 |
| 7.5 km Sprint | Terhi Markkanen | 2 | 27:20.7 | 28 |

| Event | Athlete | Time | Misses | Adjusted time ^{2} | Rank |
|---|---|---|---|---|---|
| 15 km | Johanna Saarinen | 56:27.0 | 3 | 59:27.0 | 45 |
| 15 km | Terhi Markkanen | 54:08.9 | 4 | 58:08.9 | 37 |
| 15 km | Mari Lampinen | 51:44.8 | 6 | 57:44.8 | 31 |
| 15 km | Tuija Sikiö | 53:03.0 | 1 | 54:03.0 | 14 |

Women's 3 x 7.5 km relay

| Athletes | Race | | |
| Athletes | Misses ^{1} | Time | Rank |
|---|---|---|---|
| Mari Lampinen; Tuija Sikiö; Terhi Markkanen | 0 | 1'20:17.8 | 5 |

^{1} A penalty loop of 150 metres had to be skied per missed target.
^{2} One minute added per missed target.

== Cross-country skiing ==
Men

| Event | Athlete | Race | |
| Event | Athlete | Time | Rank |
|---|---|---|---|
| 10 km C | Jari Isometsä | 29:34.4 | 16 |
| 10 km C | Jari Räsänen | 29:25.2 | 15 |
| 10 km C | Mika Myllylä | 29:17.0 | 14 |
| 10 km C | Harri Kirvesniemi | 28:23.3 | 6 |
| 15 km pursuit^{1} F | Mika Myllylä | 41:33.1 | 20 |
| 15 km pursuit^{1} F | Jari Räsänen | 41:29.9 | 19 |
| 15 km pursuit^{1} F | Jari Isometsä | 40:50.0 | 12 |
| 15 km pursuit^{1} F | Harri Kirvesniemi | 40:34.4 | 11 |
| 30 km C | Seppo Rantanen | 1'30:25.6 | 38 |
| 30 km C | Mika Myllylä | 1'30:08.8 | 34 |
| 30 km C | Mika Kuusisto | 1'28:45.6 | 26 |
| 30 km C | Harri Kirvesniemi | 1'25:28.5 | 10 |
| 50 km F | Jukka Hartonen | DNF | – |
| 50 km F | Jari Räsänen | 2'14:53.6 | 31 |
| 50 km F | Mika Kuusisto | 2'13:09.3 | 23 |
| 50 km F | Jari Isometsä | 2'12:03.5 | 22 |

^{1} Starting delay based on 10 km results.
C = Classical style, F = Freestyle

Men's 4 × 10 km relay

| Athletes | Race | |
| Athletes | Time | Rank |
|---|---|---|
| Mika Kuusisto; Harri Kirvesniemi; Jari Räsänen; Jari Isometsä | 1'41:22.9 | 3rd place, bronze medalist(s) |

Women

| Event | Athlete | Race | |
| Event | Athlete | Time | Rank |
|---|---|---|---|
| 5 km C | Marja-Liisa Kirvesniemi | 15:33.2 | 31 |
| 5 km C | Tuulikki Pyykkönen | 15:31.1 | 29 |
| 5 km C | Jaana Savolainen | 15:19.9 | 26 |
| 5 km C | Marjut Lukkarinen | 14:13.8 | 1st place, gold medalist(s) |
| 10 km pursuit^{2} F | Tuulikki Pyykkönen | 30:02.5 | 33 |
| 10 km pursuit^{2} F | Jaana Savolainen | 28:43.1 | 18 |
| 10 km pursuit^{2} F | Marjut Lukkarinen | 26:52.1 | 4 |
| 15 km C | Sirpa Ryhänen | 46:06.9 | 22 |
| 15 km C | Pirkko Määttä | 45:40.5 | 17 |
| 15 km C | Marja-Liisa Kirvesniemi | 44:02.7 | 6 |
| 15 km C | Marjut Lukkarinen | 43:29.9 | 2nd place, silver medalist(s) |
| 30 km F | Päivi Simukka | 1'34:21.7 | 37 |
| 30 km F | Sirpa Ryhänen | 1'33:55.7 | 36 |
| 30 km F | Jaana Savolainen | 1'32:49.4 | 28 |
| 30 km F | Marjut Lukkarinen | 1'27:30.9 | 10 |

^{2} Starting delay based on 5 km results.
C = Classical style, F = Freestyle

Women's 4 × 5 km relay

| Athletes | Race | |
| Athletes | Time | Rank |
|---|---|---|
| Marja-Liisa Kirvesniemi; Pirkko Määttä; Jaana Savolainen; Marjut Lukkarinen | 1'00:52.9 | 4 |

== Figure skating ==
Men

| Athlete | SP | FS | TFP | Rank |
|---|---|---|---|---|
| Oula Jääskeläinen | 23 | 17 | 28.5 | 19 |

Ice Dancing

| Athletes | CD1 | CD2 | OD | FD | TFP | Rank |
|---|---|---|---|---|---|---|
| Susanna Rahkamo; Petri Kokko | 7 | 7 | 6 | 6 | 12.4 | 6 |

== Freestyle skiing ==
Men

| Athlete | Event | Qualification | | | Final | | |
| Athlete | Event | Time | Points | Rank | Time | Points | Rank |
|---|---|---|---|---|---|---|---|
| Petri Penttinen | Moguls | 40.40 | 13.71 | 41 | did not advance | | |
| Tero Turunen | Moguls | 35.69 | 21.40 | 20 | did not advance | | |
| Janne Lahtela | Moguls | 32.64 | 21.76 | 18 | did not advance | | |

Women

| Athlete | Event | Qualification | | | Final | | |
| Athlete | Event | Time | Points | Rank | Time | Points | Rank |
|---|---|---|---|---|---|---|---|
| Minna Karhu | Moguls | 42.34 | 14.75 | 19 | did not advance | | |

== Ice hockey ==
=== Team roster ===
- Head Coach: (Finland) Pentti Matikainen

| Pos. | No. | Name | 1991-92 team |
|---|---|---|---|
| G | 1 | Jukka Tammi | (Finland) Ilves Tampere |
| G | 30 | Markus Ketterer | (Finland) Jokerit Helsinki |
| D | 3 | Timo Blomqvist | (Sweden) Malmö IF |
| D | 4 | Kari Eloranta | (Sweden) Rögle BK |
| D | 5 | Timo Jutila | (Sweden) Luleå HF |
| D | 6 | Arto Ruotanen | (Sweden) HV71 |
| D | 7 | Simo Saarinen | (Finland) HIFK Helsinki |
| D | 9 | Ville Sirén | (Finland) Tampere Ilves |
| D | 12 | Janne Laukkanen | (Finland) HPK Hämeenlinna |
| D | 44 | Harri Laurila | (Finland) JyP HT |
| F | 8 | Teemu Selänne | (Finland) Jokerit Helsinki |
| F | 11 | Jari Lindroos | (Finland) JyP HT |
| F | 14 | Petri Skriko | (Canada) Winnipeg Jets |
| F | 15 | Hannu Järvenpää | (Sweden) Leksands IF |
| F | 16 | Keijo Säilynoja | (Finland) Jokerit Helsinki |
| F | 18 | Pekka Tuomisto | (Finland) HIFK |
| F | 22 | Timo Saarikoski | (Finland) Rauman Lukko |
| F | 25 | Raimo Summanen | (Finland) Tampere Ilves |
| F | 27 | Timo Peltomaa | (Finland) Tampere Ilves |
| F | 28 | Raimo Helminen | (Sweden) Malmö IF |
| F | 40 | Mika Nieminen | (Finland) Lukko Rauma |
| F | 42 | Mikko Mäkelä | (Finland) TPS |

=== Group A ===
Twelve participating teams were placed in two groups. After playing a round-robin, the top four teams in each group advanced to the Medal Round while the last two teams competed in the consolation round for the 9th to 12th places.

| Pos | Team | Pld | W | D | L | GF | GA | GD | Pts | Qualification |
|---|---|---|---|---|---|---|---|---|---|---|
| 1 | United States | 5 | 4 | 1 | 0 | 18 | 7 | +11 | 9 | Quarterfinals |
| 2 | Sweden | 5 | 3 | 2 | 0 | 22 | 11 | +11 | 8 | Quarterfinals |
| 3 | Finland | 5 | 3 | 1 | 1 | 22 | 11 | +11 | 7 | Quarterfinals |
| 4 | Germany | 5 | 2 | 0 | 3 | 11 | 12 | −1 | 4 | Quarterfinals |
| 5 | Italy | 5 | 1 | 0 | 4 | 18 | 24 | −6 | 2 | consolation round |
| 6 | Poland | 5 | 0 | 0 | 5 | 4 | 30 | −26 | 0 | consolation round |

Source: Olympedia

| Finland | 5:1 | Germany |
| Finland | 9:1 | Poland |
| United States | 4:1 | Finland |
| Finland | 2:2 | Sweden |
| Finland | 5:3 | Italy |

=== Final round ===
Quarter-finals

| Unified Team | 6:1 | Finland |

Consolation round 5th-8th places

| Sweden | 3:2 | Finland |

7th-place match

| France | 1:4 | Finland 7th |

=== Leading scorers ===
| Rk | Player | GP | G | A | Pts |
|---|---|---|---|---|---|
| 4th | Teemu Selänne | 8 | 7 | 4 | 11 |
| 4th | Hannu Järvenpää | 8 | 5 | 6 | 11 |
| 8th | Mika Nieminen | 8 | 4 | 6 | 10 |

== Nordic combined ==
Men's individual

Events:

- normal hill ski jumping (Best two out of three jumps.)
- 15 km cross-country skiing (Start delay, based on ski jumping results.)

| Athlete | Event | Ski Jumping | | Cross-country | | Total |
| Athlete | Event | Points | Rank | Start at | Time | Rank |
|---|---|---|---|---|---|---|
| Sami Kallunki | Individual | 177.5 | 42 | +5:40.0 | 50:29.7 | 28 |
| Pasi Saapunki | Individual | 191.1 | 34 | +4:09.4 | 49:03.4 | 20 |
| Teemu Summanen | Individual | 208.3 | 12 | +2:14.7 | 49:59.4 | 24 |
| Jari Mantila | Individual | 216.7 | 5 | +1:18.7 | DNF | – |

Men's Team

Three participants per team.

Events:

- normal hill ski jumping (Best two out of three jumps per team member were counted.)
- 10 km cross-country skiing (Start delay, based on ski jumping results.)

| Athletes | Ski jumping | | Cross-country | | Total |
| Athletes | Points | Rank | Start at | Time | Rank |
|---|---|---|---|---|---|
| Pasi Saapunki; Jari Mantila; Teemu Summanen | 561.2 | 7 | +6:59.0 | 1'32:43.3 | 7 |

== Ski jumping ==
| Athlete | Event | Jump 1 | | Jump 2 | | Total | |
| Athlete | Event | Distance | Points | Distance | Points | Points | Rank |
|---|---|---|---|---|---|---|---|
| Ari-Pekka Nikkola | Normal hill | 76.0 | 82.6 | 74.5 | 80.2 | 162.8 | 53 |
| Mika Laitinen | Normal hill | 85.5 | 106.3 | 85.5 | 107.3 | 213.6 | 5 |
| Risto Laakkonen | Normal hill | 85.5 | 106.8 | 79.0 | 93.9 | 200.7 | 16 |
| Toni Nieminen | Normal hill | 88.0 | 112.3 | 84.5 | 104.7 | 217.0 | 3rd place, bronze medalist(s) |
| Ari-Pekka Nikkola | Large hill | 99.0 | 79.1 | 94.5 | 70.3 | 149.4 | 30 |
| Risto Laakkonen | Large hill | 102.0 | 83.8 | 98.5 | 80.4 | 164.2 | 21 |
| Mika Laitinen | Large hill | 109.5 | 97.8 | 85.5 | 68.2 | 166.0 | 19 |
| Toni Nieminen | Large hill | 122.0 | 118.8 | 123.0 | 120.7 | 239.5 | 1st place, gold medalist(s) |

Men's team large hill

| Athletes | Result | |
| Athletes | Points ^{1} | Rank |
|---|---|---|
| Toni Nieminen; Ari-Pekka Nikkola; Risto Laakkonen; Mika Laitinen | 644.4 | 1st place, gold medalist(s) |

^{1} Four teams members performed two jumps each. The best three were counted.

== Speed skating ==
Men

| Event | Athlete | Race | |
| Event | Athlete | Time | Rank |
|---|---|---|---|
| 500 m | Harri Ilkka | 38.48 | 26 |
| 1000 m | Harri Ilkka | 1:17.96 | 34 |
| 5000 m | Timo Järvinen | 7:30.88 | 32 |
| 10,000 m | Timo Järvinen | 14:50.75 | 21 |
