= Bobsleigh at the 1992 Winter Olympics =

Bobsleigh at the XVI Olympic Winter Games
- Venue: La Plagne
- Dates: 15–22 February 1992
- Competitors: 159 from 25 nations

Bobsleigh at the 1992 Winter Olympics consisted of two events, at La Plagne. The competition took place between February 15 and February 22, 1992.

== Medal summary ==
=== Medal table ===
Rank	Nation	Gold	Silver	Bronze	Total
1	Switzerland	1	0	1	2
2	Austria	1	0	0	1
3	Germany	0	2	1	3
Totals (3 entries)		2	2	2	6

Three countries won medals in Albertville, with Maslanka-McDonnell team leading the medal table, with two medals, one gold and one bronze. Germany won the most medals, with three. Gustav Weder and Donat Acklin were the only athletes to medal in both competitions.

=== Events ===
Event	Gold		Silver		Bronze	
Two-man	Switzerland (SUI-1); Gustav Weder; Donat Acklin	4:03.26	Germany (GER-1); Rudi Lochner; Markus Zimmermann	4:03.55	Germany (GER-2); Christoph Langen; Günther Eger	4:03.63
Four-man	Austria (AUT-1); Ingo Appelt; Harald Winkler; Gerhard Haidacher; Thomas Schroll	3:53.90	Germany (GER-1); Wolfgang Hoppe; Bogdan Musioł; Axel Kühn; René Hannemann	3:53.92	Switzerland (SUI-1); Gustav Weder; Donat Acklin; Lorenz Schindelholz; Curdin Morell	3:54.13

== Participating NOCs ==
Twenty-five nations participated in bobsleigh at the 1992 Games. Ireland, Latvia and Puerto Rico made their bobsleigh debuts.

- Australia (2)
- Austria (8)
- Bulgaria (5)
- Canada (9)
- Czechoslovakia (6)
- France (9)
- Germany (12)
- Great Britain (8)
- Ireland (4)
- Italy (8)
- Jamaica (5)
- Japan (4)
- Latvia (8)
- Mexico (7)
- Monaco (5)
- Netherlands Antilles (2)
- Norway (2)
- Puerto Rico (4)
- Romania (5)
- Switzerland (8)
- Chinese Taipei (4)
- Unified Team (9)
- United States (12)
- Virgin Islands (8)
- Yugoslavia (5)
