= Gähler =

Gähler is a surname. Notable people with the surname include:

- Heinz Gähler (born 1952), a Swiss cross-country skier
- Markus Gähler (1966–1997), a Swiss ski jumper
- Michael Gahler (born 1960), a German diplomat and politician
- Torsten Gahler (born 1973), German politician
