= Jungen =

Jungen is a surname. Notable people with the surname include:

- André Jungen (born 1968), Swiss cross-country skier
- Brian Jungen (born 1970), artist of Dane-zaa and Swiss ancestry working in British Columbia
- Killien Jungen (born 1995), Dutch-French footballer

== See also ==
- Junge
