= Sympathy for Nothing =

Austrian metal band

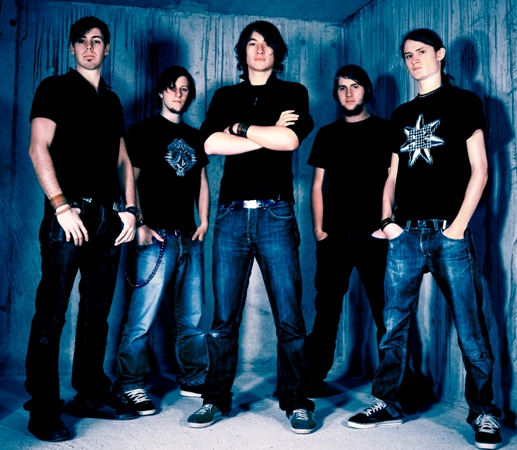
- Sympathy for Nothing in 2009

Background information
- Origin: Schwanenstadt, Austria
- Genres: Metalcore, melodic death metal
- Years active: 2006–present
- Label: Terrasound Records
- Members: Richard J. Thallinger (vocals/lyrics); Martin Wagner (drums); Christian Danninger (bass guitar); Thomas Putz (guitar/scream vocals)
- Past members: Christina Stur (vocals); Klaus Schobesberger (keyboard/synthesizer)
- Website: sympathyfornothing.com

Sympathy for Nothing is an Austrian melodic metalcore band formed in 2006.

== Band history ==
The band was formed in 2006 in Schwanenstadt/Upper Austria, Austria, by Klaus Schobesberger, Thomas Putz, Christian Danninger, Martin Wagner and Christina Stur. Stur left the band in June 2008 because of personal problems. In October of the same year, Richard Thallinger was the new singer. In May 2008 the band won the International Live Award. Martin Wagner won the title as "Austria's Best Young Drummer" in the same year. They released their first EP called Look at these eyes in 2008, too. Fans who travelled to the semi-finals of International Live Awards got that CD when they bought a special ticket of the festival.

In 2009 they reached the fifth place at Myvideo Musicstar. The winner would get a recording contract at Starwatch Music (Monrose, Queensberry, Marquess) a label founded by ProSiebenSat.1 Media. In August 2009 they played at Frequency Festival with bands like Herbstrock, Kreisky and Petsch Moser at the Donauinselfest. The band played concerts in front of 8,000 people. They played concerts in Austria, Hungary and Italy. The band was support-act for the band End of Green in November 2009.

Their second EP called Living Shades was released in 2009 and includes four tracks including "Roads to Rome" and a music video of that song. The video won at MTV Rookie in March 2009. The EP was sold at their homepage to fans in Austria and Germany.

In the end of February 2010, the band signed at Terrasound Records and they recorded their first album for the Vienna label. They played concerts with Low Found Guilt, Remember To Breathe and Horse Skeleton.

In 2011 Klaus Schobesberger left Sympathy for Nothing. The debut album, A Taste of Light was released at the end of 2011.

== Lyrics ==
The band's lyrics are written by Thallinger. They deal with personal experiences of all band members and are most times socially critical. The band says that they are non-political. The lyrics are written in English because they can't imagine a metal band with non-English words. They can reach more people when they write in English.

== Band name ==
In an interview with BezirksTV in April 2009, that Sympathy does not mean sympathy alone but suffer also.

== Genre ==
The band's style is melodic rock with melodic death metal influences. The band uses screamed vocals which is normal for metalcore bands. Vampster.com describes their music as a mix consisting out of nu metal and melodic death metal. Metal-inside.de compares their music style with Bullet for My Valentine and Seether.

== Members ==
=== Current ===
- Martin Wagner – drums (2006–present)
- Thomas Putz – guitar, unclean vocals (2006–present)
- Christian Danninger – bass (2006–present)
- Richard J. Thallinger vocals – (2008–present)

=== Former ===
- Klaus Schobesberger – keyboards/synthesizers (2006–2011)
- Christina Stur – vocals (2006–2008)

== Discography ==
=== EPs ===
- 2008: Look at These Eyes (EP)
- 2009: Living Shades (EP)

=== Compilations ===
- 2008: ILA International Live Award (with the Song Of Its Own)
- 2008: 4444 Seconds of Austrian Pop!-music Volume 10 (with Roads to Rome)

=== Albums ===
- 2012: A Taste of Light (Terrasound Records)

== Awards ==
- 2008: International Live Award (won)
- 2008: Austrias Best Young Drummer for Martin Wagner (won)
- 2008: Local Heroes (Finalist)
- 2009: MTV Rookie for their music video Roads to Rome (won)
- 2009: Myvideo Musicstar (5th)
- 2010: Austrian Newcomer Contest (won the User voting)
