= Bogdan Musioł =

German bobsledder (born 1957)

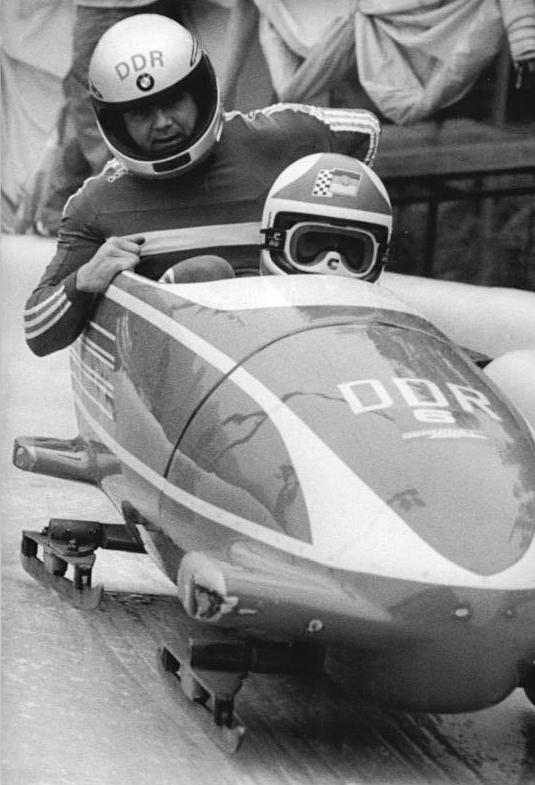
- Musiol (rear without goggles) in 1989.

Personal information
- Born: 25 July 1957 (age 69) Świętochłowice, Silesia, Poland
Medal record
Men's bobsleigh
Representing East Germany
Representing Germany
Olympic Games
Gold medal – first place	1980 Lake Placid	Four-man
Silver medal – second place	1984 Sarajevo	Two-man
Silver medal – second place	1984 Sarajevo	Four-man
Silver medal – second place	1988 Calgary	Two-man
Silver medal – second place	1988 Calgary	Four-man
Silver medal – second place	1992 Albertville	Four-man
Bronze medal – third place	1980 Lake Placid	Two-man
World Championships
Gold medal – first place	1978 Lake Placid	Four-man
Gold medal – first place	1989 Cortina d'Ampezzo	Two-man
Gold medal – first place	1991 Altenberg	Four-man
Silver medal – second place	1982 St. Moritz	Four-man
Silver medal – second place	1987 St. Moritz	Four-man
Bronze medal – third place	1989 Cortina d'Ampezzo	Four-man
Bronze medal – third place	1990 St. Moritz	Two-man

Bogdan Musiol (born 25 July 1957 in Świętochłowice, Silesia, Poland) is an East German-German bobsledder who competed from the late 1970s to the early 1990s.

The former shot putter started pushing bob sleighs in 1977 for pilot Horst Bernhard. Behind Horst Schönau he became world champion for the first time in 1978. He also pushed for Bernhard Germeshausen, Meinhard Nehmer, Bernhard Lehmann, Detlef Richter and finally Wolfgang Hoppe.

Competing in five Winter Olympic Games, he won seven medals with one gold (Four-man: 1980), five silvers (Two-man: 1984, 1988; Four-man: 1984, 1988, 1992), and one bronze (Two-man: 1980).

Musiol also won seven medals at the FIBT World Championships with three golds (Two-man: 1989, Four-man: 1978, 1991), two silvers (Four-man: 1982, 1987), and two bronzes (Two-man: 1990, Four-man: 1989).

From 1980 to 1988, the former NVA Hauptmann took part for East Germany, then after German reunification in 1990 for Germany at the Winter Olympics until 1994. At the end of his career he had won 31 medals at international competitions (Olympics, World and European championships – 7 golds, 16 silvers, and 8 bronzes) and was the most successful bob athlete until Wolfgang Hoppe scored 33.

Musiol competed for ASK Vorwärts Oberhof, later WSV Oberhof 05. He owns fitness studios in Zella-Mehlis and Oschatz. He was in charge for the material of the German Bob- und Schlittenverband für Deutschland until his dismissal in 2000.
