= Look at These Eyes =

EP by Sympathy for Nothing
- Released: 2008
- Recorded: 2008
- Genre: Melodic metalcore
- Label: Self-released
- Producer: Sympathy for Nothing

Sympathy for Nothing chronology
Look at These Eyes (2008)	Living Shades (2009)

Look at These Eyes is the first EP from Austrian melodic metalcore band Sympathy for Nothing. It was released in 2008 and was sold at the semi-finals of Austrian Band Contest. It consists of six tracks.

== Track listing ==
1. Way
2. Promise
3. Consequence
4. Look at these eyes
5. Brainkiller
6. Powerless Boy
