= FIBT World Championships 1990 =

Bobsleigh and skeleton world championships

1990 World Championships
- Location: St. Moritz, Switzerland; Königssee, West Germany

The FIBT World Championships 1990 took place in St. Moritz, Switzerland (Bobsleigh) and Königssee, West Germany (Skeleton). St. Moritz hosted a championship event for the record seventeenth time. The Swiss city had hosted the event previously in 1931 (Four-man), 1935 (Four-man), 1937 (Four-man), 1938 (Two-man), 1939 (Two-man), 1947, 1955, 1957, 1959, 1965, 1970, 1974, 1977, 1982, 1987, and 1989 (Skeleton). Meanwhile, Königssee hosted a championship event for the third time, doing so previously in 1979 and 1986.

== Two man bobsleigh ==
Pos	Team	Time
Gold	Switzerland (Gustav Weder, Bruno Gerber)	
Silver	East Germany (Harald Czudaj, Axel Jang)	
Bronze	East Germany (Wolfgang Hoppe, Bogdan Musioł)	

== Four-man bobsleigh ==
Pos	Team	Time
Gold	Switzerland (Gustav Weder, Bruno Gerber, Lorenz Schindelholz, Curdin Morell)	
Silver	East Germany (Harald Czudaj, Tino Bonk, Alexander Szelig, Axel Jang)	
Bronze	Austria (Ingo Appelt, Gerhard Redl, Jürgen Mandl, Harald Winkler)	

A controversy was created when Weder was caught overnight by officials scraping off ice at a difficult corner of the track. Bobsleigh officials allowed him to compete, and he won his first world championship in the four-man event.

== Men's skeleton ==
Pos	Athlete	Time
Gold	Michael Grünberger (AUT)	
Silver	Andi Schmid (AUT)	
Bronze	Gregor Stähli (SUI)	

== Medal table ==
Rank	Nation	Gold	Silver	Bronze	Total
1	Switzerland (SUI)	2	0	1	3
2	Austria (AUT)	1	1	1	3
3	East Germany (GDR)	0	2	1	3
Totals (3 entries)		3	3	3	9
