= Curdin Morell =

Swiss bobsledder (born 1963)

Medal record

Bobsleigh

Olympic Games
Bronze medal – third place	1992 Albertville	Four-man

World Championships
Gold medal – first place	1989 Cortina d'Ampezzo	Four-man
Gold medal – first place	1990 St. Moritz	Four-man
Silver medal – second place	1991 Altenberg	Two-man
Silver medal – second place	1991 Altenberg	Four-man

Curdin Morell (born 9 July 1963) is a Swiss bobsledder who competed in the late 1980s and the early 1990s. At the 1992 Winter Olympics in Albertville, he won a bronze medal in the four-man event with teammates Gustav Weder, Donat Acklin and Lorenz Schindelholz.

Morell also won four medals at the FIBT World Championships with two golds (Four-man: 1989, 1990) and two silvers (Two-man and four-man: both 1991).

After his retirement he coached fellow Swiss bobsledder Ivo Rüegg.
