= Lorenz Schindelholz =

Swiss bobsledder (born 1966)

Medal record

Bobsleigh

Olympic Games
Bronze medal – third place	1992 Albertville	Four-man

World Championships
Gold medal – first place	1989 Cortina d'Ampezzo	Four-man
Gold medal – first place	1990 St. Moritz	Four-man
Silver medal – second place	1991 Altenberg	Two-man

Lorenz Schindelholz (born 23 July 1966) is a Swiss bobsledder who competed in the late 1980s and early 1990s. He won a bronze medal in the four-man event with his teammates Gustav Weder, Donat Acklin and Curdin Morell at the 1992 Winter Olympics in Albertville.

Schindelholz also won three medals in the four-man event at the FIBT World Championships with two golds (1989, 1990) and one silver (1991).
