= Tino Bonk =

German bobsledder (born 1967)

Medal record

Bobsleigh

World Championships
| Silver medal – second place | 1990 St. Moritz | Four-man |
| Bronze medal – third place | 1991 Altenberg | Four-man |

Tino Bonk (born 1 March 1967 in Dresden, Saxony) is an East German-German bobsledder who competed in the early 1990s. He won two medals in the four-man event at the FIBT World Championships with a silver in 1990 (for East Germany) a bronze in 1991 (for Germany).

Bonk also finished sixth in the four-man event at the 1992 Winter Olympics in Albertville.
