= Axel Jang =

German bobsledder

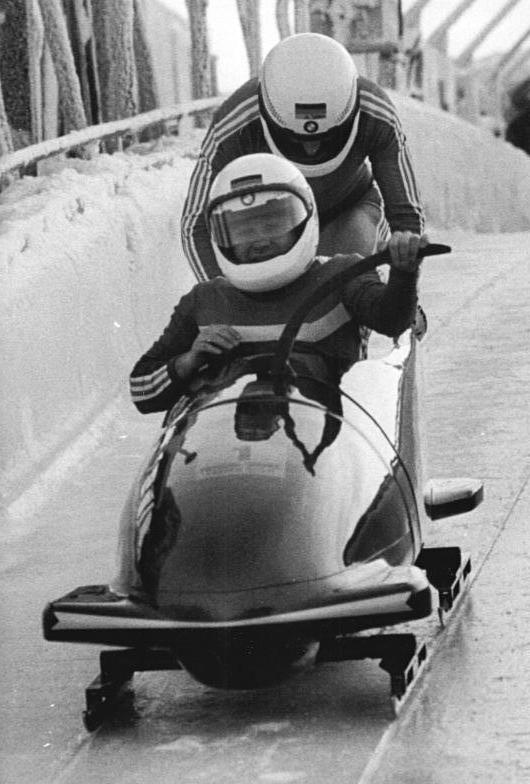
- Jang (rear) in 1990.
Medal record
Men's Bobsleigh
Representing East Germany
World Championships
Silver medal – second place	1990 St. Moritz	Two-man
Silver medal – second place	1990 St. Moritz	Four-man
Bronze medal – third place	1991 Altenberg	Four-man

Axel Jang (born 28 December 1968 in WerdauSaxony) is an East German-German bobsledder who competed in the early 1990s. He won three medals at the FIBT World Championships with two silvers (Two-man and four-man: both 1990 for East Germany) and one bronze (Four-man: 1991 for Germany).

Jang also finished sixth in the four-man event at the 1992 Winter Olympics in Albertville.
