= René Mangold =

Swiss track and field athlete and bobsledder

Personal information
- Born: 7 December 1963 (age 62)

Sport
- Sport: Bobsleigh; Track and field
Medal record
Representing Switzerland
Bobsleigh
World Championships
Silver medal – second place	1989 Cortina d'Ampezzo	Four-man

René Mangold (born 7 December 1963) is a Swiss track and field athlete and bobsledder.

== Track and field ==
Active since 1972, Mangold's peak performances came in 1988, when he became Swiss champion in the 100 metre and 200 metre sprint competitions and finished second in the long jump competition. He won the 100m competition with a time of 10.58sec, and the 200 metres in 21.46sec.

== Bobsleigh ==
He won a silver medal in the four-man event at the 1989 FIBT World Championships in Cortina d'Ampezzo.
