= FIBT World Championships 1991 =

Bobsleigh and skeleton competition

1991 World Championships
- Location: Altenberg, Germany; Igls, Austria

The FIBT World Championships 1991 took place in Altenberg, Germany (Bobsleigh) and Igls, Austria (Skeleton). This was Altenberg's first time hosting a championship event. Igls was hosting its third, doing so previously in 1935 (Two-man) and 1963. It marked the first time a unified German team competed since World War II with East Germany and West Germany having been unified the previous year.

== Two man bobsleigh ==
| Pos | Team | Time |
|---|---|---|
| Gold | Germany (Rudi Lochner, Markus Zimmermann) | |
| Silver | Switzerland (Gustav Weder, Curdin Morell) | |
| Bronze | Germany (Wolfgang Hoppe, René Hannemann) | |

== Four man bobsleigh ==
| Pos | Team | Time |
|---|---|---|
| Gold | Germany (Wolfgang Hoppe, Bogdan Musioł, Axel Kühn, Christoph Langen) | |
| Silver | Switzerland (Gustav Weder, Bruno Gerber, Lorenz Schindelholz, Curdin Morell) | |
| Bronze | Germany (Harald Czudaj, Tino Bonk, Axel Jang, Alexander Szelig) | |

== Men's skeleton ==
| Pos | Athlete | Time |
|---|---|---|
| Gold | Christian Auer (AUT) | |
| Silver | Andi Schmid (AUT) | |
| Bronze | Michael Grünberger (AUT) | |

This was the first sweep in any event of the championships.

== Medal table ==
| Rank | Nation | Gold | Silver | Bronze | Total |
|---|---|---|---|---|---|
| 1 | Germany (GER) | 2 | 0 | 2 | 4 |
| 2 | Austria (AUT) | 1 | 1 | 1 | 3 |
| 3 | Switzerland (SUI) | 0 | 2 | 0 | 2 |
| Totals (3 entries) | | 3 | 3 | 3 | 9 |
