= Kari Kataja =

Finnish biathlete

Personal information
- Nationality: Finnish
- Born: 23 April 1966 (age 58); Pälkäne, Finland

Sport
- Sport: Biathlon

Kari Kataja (born 23 April 1966) is a Finnish biathlete. He competed in the men's 20 km individual event at the 1992 Winter Olympics.
