= Mari Lampinen =

Finnish biathlete

Personal information
- Full name: Mari Johanna Lampinen
- Nationality: Finnish
- Born: 11 September 1971 (age 53); Lahti, Finland

Sport
- Sport: Biathlon

Mari Johanna Lampinen (born 11 September 1971) is a Finnish biathlete. She competed at the 1992, 1994 and the 1998 Winter Olympics.
