= Living Shades =

EP by Sympathy for Nothing
- Released: 2009
- Recorded: 2008–2009
- Genre: Melodic metalcore
- Length: 13:30
- Label: Own produced
- Producer: Sympathy for Nothing

Sympathy for Nothing chronology
Look at these Eyes (2008)	Living Shades (2009)

Professional ratings
Review scores
Source	Rating
Vampster	(not rated) link
Powermetal.de	(favorable) link

Living Shades is the second self-made EP of Austrian metal band Sympathy for Nothing. After winning at Austrian band contest where the band won 14.000 Euros and more prizes for 100.000 Euros, including producing a professional music video and CD the band went into Hinterhof Studios and Gosh Studios to produce Living Shades. The CD consists out ouf 4 tracks, a music video and an online mediabook.

== Cover design and booklet ==
The freehand-drawings are from singer Richard J. Thallinger, the band logo from drummer Martin Wagner and layout designs are from keyboarder Klaus Schobesberger.

== Track listing ==
1. Little Something
2. Roads to Rome
3. Remedy the Mess
4. D.F.M.H. (Don't Fuck My Heart)
- Music video Roads to Rome
- Online media book

== Lyrics ==
The songs handle topics such as love, politics, war, social problems and personal experiences from the band members.

== Success ==
The music video of Roads to Rome reached fifth place at MyVideo Music star and won the MTV Rookie Award in March 2009. Many famous online magazines such as Powermetal and Vampster gave the EP positive reviews.
