= Bruno Gerber =

Swiss bobsledder (born 1964)

Medal record

Bobsleigh

World Championships
Gold medal – first place	1989 Cortina d'Ampezzo	Four-man
Gold medal – first place	1990 St. Moritz	Two-man
Gold medal – first place	1990 St. Moritz	Four-man
Silver medal – second place	1989 Cortina d'Ampezzo	Two-man
Silver medal – second place	1991 Altenberg	Four-man

Bruno Gerber (born 23 August 1964 in Rothenfluh) is a Swiss bobsleigher who competed in the late 1980s and the early 1990s. He won four medals at the FIBT World Championships with three golds (Two-man: 1990, Four-man: 1989, 1990) and two silvers (Two-man: 1991, Four-man: 1991).

Gerber also finished fifth in the four-man event at the 1992 Winter Olympics in Albertville.
