= Terhi Markkanen =

Finnish biathlete

Personal information
- Full name: Terhi Suvi Hannele Markkanen
- Nationality: Finnish
- Born: 6 November 1973 (age 51)

Sport
- Sport: Biathlon

Terhi Suvi Hannele Markkanen (born 6 November 1973) is a Finnish biathlete. She competed in three events at the 1992 Winter Olympics.
