= Petsch Moser (skier) =

Swiss freestyle skier

Personal information
- Nationality: Swiss
- Born: 26 January 1960 (age 65)

Sport
- Sport: Freestyle skiing

Petsch Moser (born 26 January 1960) is a Swiss freestyle skier. He competed in the men's moguls event at the 1992 Winter Olympics. The Austrian band of the same name was inspired by him when searching their denomination.
