= Petsch Moser =

Austrian band

- Origin: Lower Austria
- Genres: Indie rock
- Years active: 1995–present
- Labels: Wohnzimmer Records, Masterplan
- Members: Piotr Szwarczewski; Christian Stangl; Lukas Filipek; Martin Knobloch; Lukas Müller
- Past members: Andreas Remenyi
- Website: www.petschmoser.com

Petsch Moser is an indie rock band from Vienna, Austria. They took their rather unusual name from Swiss skier Petsch Moser, who gave his consent to the use of his name. In 2005 the band was nominated for the Amadeus Austrian Music Award.

== History ==
Founded 1995 in Lower Austria, the band soon relocated to Vienna, where the scene for indie rock music was growing at that time. Especially Austrian radio channel FM4 contributed to their success with playing the group's songs regularly. Most of the songs are written in German, but some older ones are in English as well. After Andreas Remenyi (vocals, guitar) left the band in 2006, the band tours as a five-piece with Lukas Müller on keyboards and Martin Knobloch on bass.

== Discography ==
- 1999 - Bitte Sweet Me
- 2002 - Von Städten und Bäumen
- 2004 - Die Stellen
- 2004 - Vinyl: Hinter Glas inkl. Remixe (Masterplan Records)
- 2005 - DVD: A Night At The Flex
- 2006 - Reforma
- 2010 - Johnny
