= FIBT World Championships 1989 =

Bobsleigh and skeleton competition

1989 World Championships
- Location: Cortina d'Ampezzo, Italy; St. Moritz, Switzerland

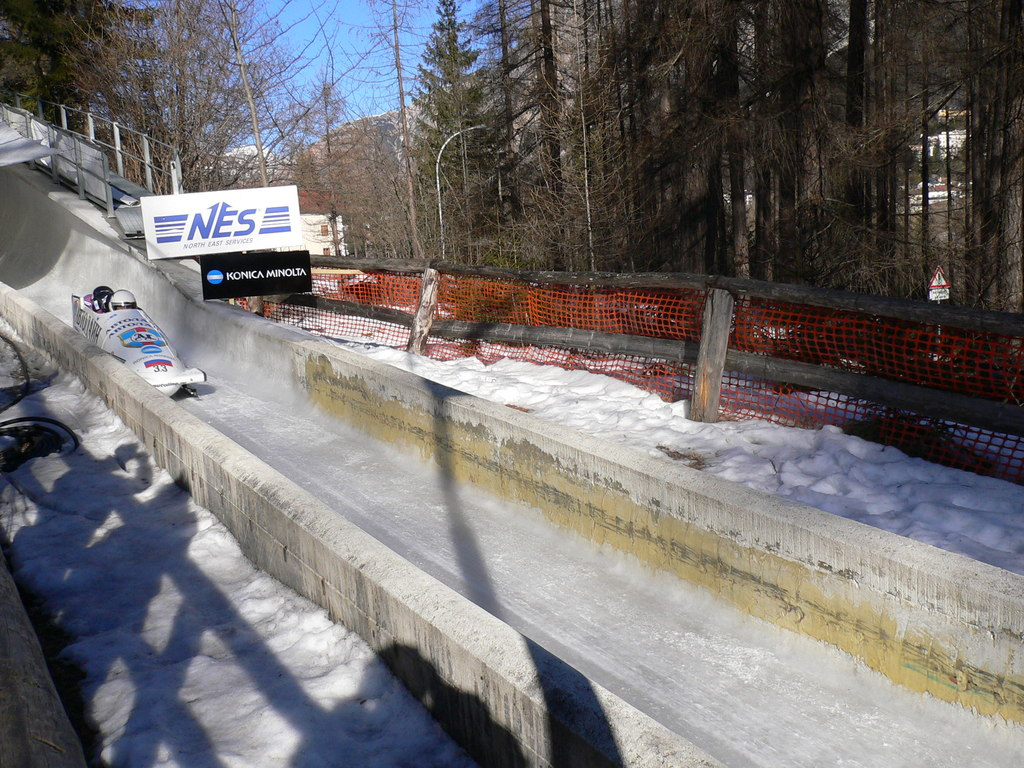
Bobsleigh World Cup 4-man. The Russia-1 crew on the Antelao straight, Eugenio Monti track in Cortina d'Ampezzo.

The FIBT World Championships 1989 took place in Cortina d'Ampezzo, Italy (Bobsleigh) and St. Moritz, Switzerland (Skeleton). Cortina hosted the championships for the eighth time, having hosted the event previously in 1937 (Two-man), 1939 (Four-man), 1950, 1954, 1960, 1966, and 1981. Meanwhile, St. Moritz hosted a championship event for the record sixteenth time. The Swiss city had hosted the event previously in 1931 (Four-man), 1935 (Four-man), 1937 (Four-man), 1938 (Two-man), 1939 (Two-man), 1947, 1955, 1957, 1959, 1965, 1970, 1974, 1977, 1982, and 1987. The skeleton event became an official championship event this year, albeit at a separate location from the bobsleigh event. They would not be at the same location other than St. Moritz for the first time until the 1996 championships in Calgary, Alberta, Canada.

== Two-man bobsleigh ==
Pos	Team	Time
Gold	East Germany (Wolfgang Hoppe, Bogdan Musioł)	
Silver	Switzerland (Gustav Weder, Bruno Gerber)	
Bronze	Soviet Union (Jānis Ķipurs, Aldis Intlers)	

== Four-man bobsleigh ==
Pos	Team	Time
Gold	Switzerland (Gustav Weder, Curdin Morell, Bruno Gerber, Lorenz Schindelholz)	
Silver	Switzerland (Nico Baracchi, Christian Reich, Donat Acklin, René Mangold)	
Bronze	East Germany (Wolfgang Hoppe, Bodo Ferl, Bogdan Musioł, Ingo Voge)	

Baracchi becomes the first person to medal in both bobsleigh and skeleton at the championships.

== Men's skeleton ==
Pos	Athlete	Time
Gold	Alain Wicki (SUI)	
Silver	Christian Auer (AUT)	
Bronze	Franz Plangger (AUT)	

== Medal table ==
Rank	Nation	Gold	Silver	Bronze	Total
1	Switzerland (SUI)	2	2	0	4
2	East Germany (GDR)	1	0	1	2
3	Austria (AUT)	0	1	1	2
4	Soviet Union (URS)	0	0	1	1
Totals (4 entries)		3	3	3	9
