= Thomas Lagler =

Swiss freestyle skier

Personal information
- Nationality: Swiss
- Born: 5 November 1968 (age 56)

Sport
- Sport: Freestyle skiing

Thomas Lagler (born 5 November 1968) is a Swiss freestyle skier. He competed in the men's moguls event at the 1992 Winter Olympics.
