= Martin Bayer =

Slovak Nordic combined skier

Personal information
- Nationality: Slovak
- Born: 20 December 1972 (age 52); Poprad, Czechoslovakia

Sport
- Sport: Nordic combined

Martin Bayer (born 20 December 1972) is a Slovak skier. He competed in the Nordic combined events at the 1992 Winter Olympics and the 1994 Winter Olympics.
