= Torsten Gahler =

German politician (born 1973)

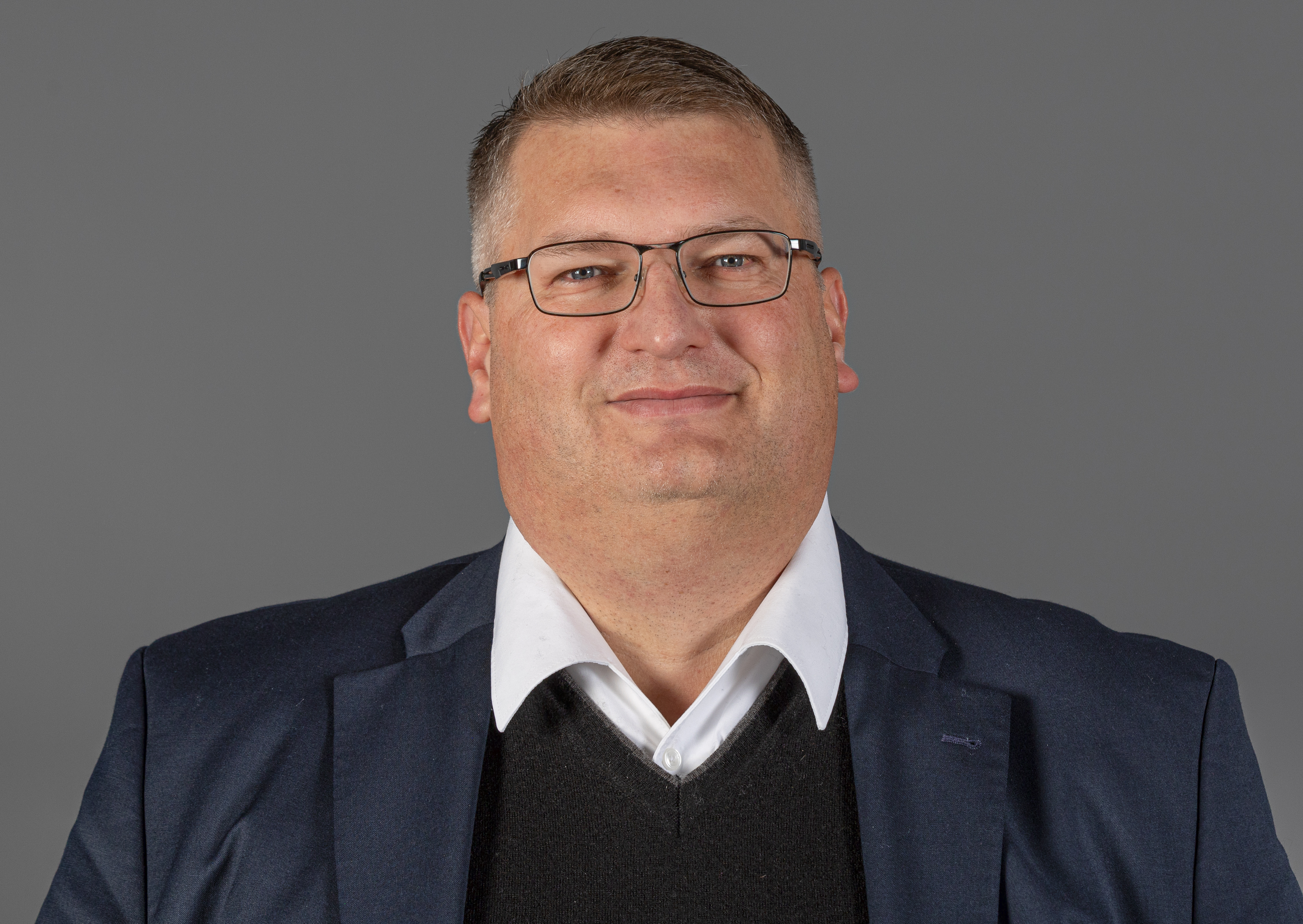
- Gahler in 2025

Member of the Landtag of Saxony
- Incumbent
- Assumed office 1 October 2019

Personal details
- Born: 1973 (age 52–53) Stollberg
- Party: Alternative for Germany (since 2017)

Torsten Gahler (born 1973 in Stollberg) is a German politician serving as a member of the Landtag of Saxony since 2019. He has served as treasurer of the AfD Saxony since 2020.
