= Stefan Habas =

Polish Nordic combined skier

Personal information
- Nationality: Polish
- Born: 21 April 1971 (age 53); Zakopane, Poland

Sport
- Sport: Nordic combined

Stefan Habas (born 21 April 1971) is a Polish skier. He competed in the Nordic combined event at the 1992 Winter Olympics.
