= Sven Leonhardt =

German Nordic combined skier

Personal information
- Nationality: German
- Born: 18 April 1968 (age 56)

Sport
- Sport: Nordic combined

Sven Leonhardt (born 18 April 1968) is a German skier. He competed in the Nordic combined event at the 1992 Winter Olympics.
