= Killien Jungen =

Dutch footballer (born 1995)

Personal information
- Date of birth: 16 March 1995 (age 31)
- Place of birth: Purmerend, Netherlands
- Height: 1.80 m (5 ft 11 in)
- Position: Forward

Team information
- Current team: Cagnes-Le Cros

Youth career
- Monaco
- Vitesse

Senior career*
Years	Team	Apps	(Gls)
2014–2015	Erzgebirge Aue	0	(0)
2015	→ Erzgebirge Aue II (loan)	4	(0)
2016	TOP Oss	1	(0)
2018–2020	RC Grasse	17	(1)
2020–2023	Cannes	45	(5)
2023–2024	Cagnes-Le Cros	13	(4)
- * Club domestic league appearances and goals as of 1 July 2025

Killien Jungen (born 16 March 1995) is a Dutch footballer who plays as a attacker for French Championnat National 3 club Cagnes-Le Cros.

== Career ==
At the age of 17, Jungen joined the youth academy of Dutch side Vitesse and trialed with the youth academy of Ajax, the most successful club in the Netherlands, after playing for the youth academy of French Ligue 1 team Monaco.

In 2014, he signed for Erzgebirge Aue in Germany after trialing for Hungarian outfit MTK and Antwerp in the Belgian second division.

Before the second half of 2015/16, Jungen signed for Dutch side TOP Oss, where he made 1 league appearance and scored 0 goals and suffered a cruciate ligament injury. On 29 January 2016, he debuted for TOP Oss during a 2–3 loss to FC Dordrecht.

In 2018, Jungen signed for RC Grasse in the French fourth division.

In 2020, he signed for French fifth division club Cannes.

== International career ==
Jungen is eligible to represent France, having moved there at the age of 1.

== Career statistics ==
As of 25 May 2021

Appearances and goals by club, season and competition
Club	Season	League			Cup		Total	
Club	Season	Division	Apps	Goals	Apps	Goals	Apps	Goals
Erzgebirge Aue II	2014-15	NOFV-Oberliga	4	0	-|-		4	0
TOP Oss	2015-16	Eerste Divisie	1	0	-|-		1	0
RC Grasse	2018-19	Championnat National 2	17	1	-|-		17	1
Cannes	2020-21	Championnat National 3	4	0	0|0		4	0
