= Johanna Saarinen =

Finnish biathlete (born 1973)

Personal information
- Full name: Johanna Maria Saarinen
- Nationality: Finnish
- Born: 8 September 1973 (age 51)

Sport
- Sport: Biathlon

Johanna Maria Saarinen (born 8 September 1973) is a Finnish biathlete. She competed in two events at the 1992 Winter Olympics.
