= Tuija Sikiö =

Finnish biathlete

Personal information
- Nationality: Finnish
- Born: 23 November 1969 (age 55)

Sport
- Sport: Biathlon

Tuija Sikiö (born 23 November 1969) is a Finnish biathlete. She competed at the 1992 Winter Olympics and the 1994 Winter Olympics.
