= André Jungen =

Swiss cross-country skier

Personal information
- Nationality: Swiss
- Born: 3 March 1968 (age 57)

Sport
- Sport: Cross-country skiing

André Jungen (born 3 March 1968) is a Swiss cross-country skier. He competed in the men's 10 kilometre classical event at the 1992 Winter Olympics.
