= Martin Trunz =

Swiss ski jumper

Martin Trunz (born 2 May 1970) is a Swiss former ski jumper who competed from 1990 to 1996. At the Winter Olympics, he finished eighth in the team large hill at Albertville in 1992 and 40th in the individual large hill at Lillehammer in 1994.

Trunz's best finish at the FIS Nordic World Ski Championships was sixth in the team large hill at Val di Fiemme in 1991 and 13th in the individual normal hill at Thunder Bay, Ontario in 1995. His best finish at the Ski-flying World Championships was sixth at Harrachov in 1992, which was tied for his best individual career. He also finished sixth in a normal hill event at Falun that same year.
