= Urs Niedhart =

Swiss Nordic combined skier

Personal information
- Nationality: Swiss
- Born: 11 September 1969 (age 55)

Sport
- Sport: Nordic combined

Urs Niedhart (born 11 September 1969) is a Swiss skier. He competed in the Nordic combined event at the 1992 Winter Olympics.
