= Sami Kallunki =

Finnish Nordic combined skier

Personal information
- Full name: Sami Olavi Kallunki
- Nationality: Finnish
- Born: 27 April 1971 Kuusamo, Finland
- Died: 2 December 1999 (aged 28) Kuusamo, Finland

Sport
- Sport: Nordic combined

Sami Olavi Kallunki (27 April 1971 – 2 December 1999) was a Finnish skier. He competed in the Nordic combined event at the 1992 Winter Olympics. Kallunki committed suicide in 1999.
