= Marco Zarucchi =

Swiss Nordic combined skier (born 1972)

Marco Zarucchi (born 22 January 1972) is a Swiss Nordic combined skier who competed in his sport from 1993 to 1999. He finished seventh in the 4 x 5 km team event at the 1998 Winter Olympics in Nagano.

Zarruchi's best finish at the FIS Nordic World Ski Championships was 17th in the 7.5 km sprint event at Ramsau in 1999. His best World Cup finish was second in a 7.5 km sprint event in Austria in 1998.

Zarruchi earned four career victories, all in 1997 in 15 km individual World Cup B events.
