= Teemu Summanen =

Finnish former Nordic combined skier (born 1975)

Teemu Summanen (born 14 November 1975) is a Finnish former Nordic combined skier who competed from 1992 to 1995. He finished seventh in the 3 x 10 km team event at the 1992 Winter Olympics in Albertville.

Summanen's best career finish was second on three occasions in the 15 km individual event, once in 1992 and twice in 1995.
