= Barbara Mettler =

Swiss cross-country skier

Personal information
- Nationality: Switzerland
- Born: June 30, 1971 (age 55)

Sport
- Sport: Skiing
- Club: SC Davos

World Cup career
- Seasons: 5 – (1992–1994, 1996, 1998)
- Indiv. starts: 35
- Indiv. podiums: 0
- Team starts: 3
- Team podiums: 0
- Overall titles: 0 – (17th in 1992)
- Discipline titles: 0
Medal record
Women's cross-country skiing
Representing Switzerland
Junior World Championships
Silver medal – second place	1991 Reit im Winkl	15 km freestyle
Bronze medal – third place	1990 Les Saisies	4 × 5 km relay

Barbara Mettler (born 30 June 1971) is a Swiss former cross-country skier who competed from 1991 to 1998. Competing in two Winter Olympics, she earned her best finishes at Lillehammer in 1994 with a fifth in the 4 × 5 km relay overall and a 23rd in the 5 km + 10 km combined pursuit individually, respectively.

Mettler's best finish at the FIS Nordic World Ski Championships was 16th in the 30 km at Falun in 1993. Her best World Cup finish was eighth in a 15 km event in Canada in 1991.

Mettler's lone career victory was in a 10 km FIS race in Switzerland in 1996.

== Cross-country skiing results ==
All results are sourced from the International Ski Federation (FIS).

=== Olympic Games ===
Year	Age	5 km	15 km	Pursuit	30 km	4 × 5 km relay
1992	20	32	DNS	42	—	—
1994	22	37	30	23	41	5

=== World Championships ===
Year	Age	5 km	10 km freestyle	15 km	Pursuit	30 km	4 × 5 km relay
1991	19	—	22	21	—N/a	23	10
1993	21	51	—N/a	23	DNS	16	7

=== World Cup ===
==== Season standings ====
Season	Age			
Season	Age	Overall	Long Distance	Sprint
1992	20	17	—N/a	—N/a
1993	21	29	—N/a	—N/a
1994	22	35	—N/a	—N/a
1996	24	NC	—N/a	—N/a
1998	26	NC	NC	—
