= Wolfgang Hoppe =

East German bobsledder (born 1957)

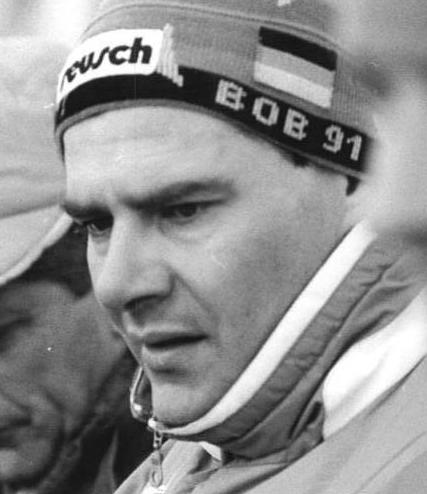
- Wolfgang Hoppe in 1990

Personal information
- Nationality: German
- Born: 14 November 1957 (age 68) Apolda, East Germany
- Height: 1.81 m (5 ft 11 in)
- Weight: 89 kg (196 lb; 14.0 st)

Sport
- Country: East Germany; Germany
- Sport: Bobsleigh (pilot)
- Event(s): 4-man, 2-man
- Club: SC Turbine Erfurt (19??-1981); ASK Vorwärts Oberhof (1981–1989); WSV Oberhof 05 (1989–1998)
- Coached by: Raimund Bethge
- Retired: 1998

Achievements and titles
- Personal best: 1st place, gold medalist(s) 2nd place, silver medalist(s) 3rd place, bronze medalist(s)
Medal record
Representing East Germany
Representing Germany
Men's bobsleigh
Olympic Games
Gold medal – first place	1984 Sarajevo	Two-man
Gold medal – first place	1984 Sarajevo	Four-man
Silver medal – second place	1988 Calgary	Two-man
Silver medal – second place	1988 Calgary	Four-man
Silver medal – second place	1992 Albertville	Four-man
Bronze medal – third place	1994 Lillehammer	Four-man
World Championships
Gold medal – first place	1985 Cervinia	Two-man
Gold medal – first place	1986 Königssee	Two-man
Gold medal – first place	1989 Cortina d'Ampezzo	Two-man
Gold medal – first place	1991 Altenberg	Four-man
Gold medal – first place	1995 Winterberg	Four-man
Gold medal – first place	1997 St. Moritz	Four-man
Silver medal – second place	1987 St. Moritz	Two-man
Silver medal – second place	1987 St. Moritz	Four-man
Bronze medal – third place	1983 Lake Placid	Two-man
Bronze medal – third place	1989 Cortina d'Ampezzo	Four-man
Bronze medal – third place	1990 St. Moritz	Two-man
Bronze medal – third place	1991 Altenberg	Two-man
Bronze medal – third place	1993 Igls	Two-man
Bronze medal – third place	1996 Calgary	Four-man
World Cup Championships
Gold medal – first place	1990–91	Two-man
Gold medal – first place	1991–92	Combined
Gold medal – first place	1991–92	Four-man
Gold medal – first place	1995–96	Four-man
Silver medal – second place	1986–87	Combined
Silver medal – second place	1986–87	Four-man
Silver medal – second place	1996–97	Four-man
Bronze medal – third place	1986–87	Two-man
Bronze medal – third place	1989–90	Combined
Bronze medal – third place	1990–91	Combined
Bronze medal – third place	1992–93	Four-man
European Championships
Gold medal – first place	1986 Iglis	Two-man
Gold medal – first place	1987 Cervinia	Two-man
Gold medal – first place	1987 Cervinia	Four-man
Gold medal – first place	1995 Altenberg	Four-man
Silver medal – second place	1985 St. Moritz	Two-man
Silver medal – second place	1985 St. Moritz	Four-man
Silver medal – second place	1989 Winterberg	Two-man
Silver medal – second place	1996 St. Moritz	Four-man
German Championships
Gold medal – first place	1993	Four-man
Gold medal – first place	1994	Four-man
East German Championships
Gold medal – first place	1985 Oberhof	Two-man
Gold medal – first place	1986 Altenberg	Two-man
Gold medal – first place	1987 Altenberg	Four-man
Gold medal – first place	1988 Altenberg	Two-man
Gold medal – first place	1988 Altenberg	Four-man
Men's Athletics
East German Junior Championships
Silver medal – second place	1976	decathlon

Wolfgang Hoppe (German pronunciation: [ˈhɔppə]; born 14 November 1957, Apolda, Thuringia) is a former East German decathlete, bob pilot and 36-time international medal winner who competed from the early 1980s to the late 1990s. Competing in four Winter Olympics, he won six medals with two golds (Two-man: 1984, Four-man: 1984), three silvers (Two-man: 1988, Four-man: 1988, 1992), and one bronze (1994).

At the opening ceremonies of the 1992 Winter Olympics in Albertville, Hoppe carried the flag of Germany, who was competing as a unified nation in the Winter Olympics for the first time since the 1936 Winter Olympics in Garmisch-Partenkirchen.

Hoppe also won fourteen medals at the FIBT World Championships with six golds (Two-man: 1985, 1986, 1989; Four-man: 1991, 1995, 1997), one silver (Four-man: 1987), and seven bronzes (Two-man: 1983, 1987, 1990, 1991, 1993; Four-man: 1989, 1996). He also won the Bobsleigh World Cup championship in combined men's (1991–92), two-man (1990–91), and four-man (1991–92, 1995–96).

Hoppe, a former army major, retired from bobsledding after the 1997 FIBT World Championships to become coach of the German national team, coaching such athletes as Susi Erdmann, Sandra Kiriasis, Gabriele Kohlisch, and André Lange.

In October 1986, he was awarded a Star of People's Friendship in gold (second class) for his sporting success.

He is the brother of motocross racer and 37-time medal winner Heinz Hoppe.

== See also ==
- Bobsleigh Olympic Medal table
