= Christian Meili =

Swiss bobsledder (born 1963)

Christian Meili (born 7 January 1963) is a Swiss bobsledder who has competed in the early 1990s. Competing in two Winter Olympics, he earned his best finish of fifth in the four-man event at Albertville in 1992.

Meili is still active as an official with the St. Moritz bobsleigh club.
