= Gerold Löffler =

Swiss bobsledder (born 1967)

Gerold Löffler (born 26 January 1967) is a Swiss bobsledder who competed in the early 1990s. Competing in two Winter Olympics, he earned his best finish of fifth in the four-man event at Albertville in 1992.
