= Markus Gähler =

Swiss ski jumper

Markus Gähler (March 26, 1966 – May 11, 1997) was a Swiss ski jumper who competed from 1987 to 1993. At the 1992 Winter Olympics in Albertville, he finished eighth in the team large hill and 35th in the individual large hill events.

Gahler's best finish at the Ski-flying World Championships was 23rd at Harrachov in 1992 which was also his best World Cup career finish.
