= Hans Diethelm =

Swiss cross-country skier

Personal information
- Nationality: Switzerland
- Born: 18 July 1967 (age 58)

Sport
- Sport: Skiing

World Cup career
- Seasons: 1989–1990, 1992–1996
- Indiv. starts: 41
- Indiv. podiums: 0
- Team starts: 5
- Team podiums: 0
- Overall titles: 0 – (82nd in 1994)

Hans Diethelm (born 18 July 1967) is a Swiss cross-country skier who competed from 1992 to 1997. Competing in two Winter Olympics, he earned his best individual finish of seventh in the 4 × 10 km relay at Lillehammer in 1994 and had his best individual finish of 30th twice (50 km: 1992, 10 km + 15 km combined pursuit: 1994).

Diethelm's best finish at the FIS Nordic World Ski Championships was 27th in the 10 km event at Falun in 1993. His best World Cup finish was 17th in an individual sprint event in Germany in 1996.

Diethelm's best individual career finish was second in a 15 km FIS race in Switzerland in 1995.

== World Cup results ==
All results are sourced from the International Ski Federation (FIS).

=== World Cup standings ===
Season	Age	Overall
1989	22	
1990	23	
1992	25	
1993	26	
1994	27	
1995	28	
1996	29	
