= Jean-Marc Chabloz =

Swiss biathlete (born 1967)

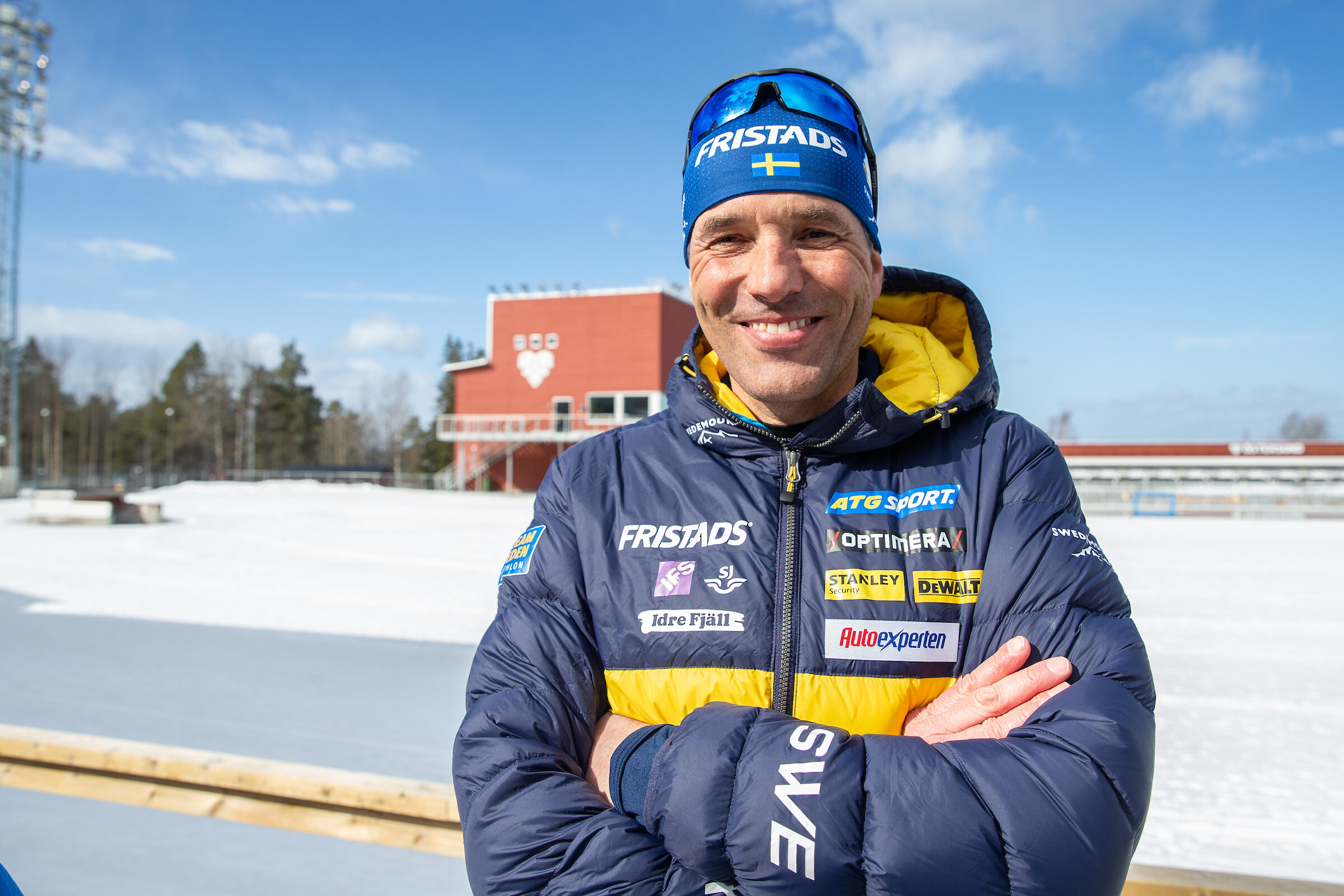

Personal information
- Nationality: Swiss
- Born: 27 May 1967 (age 58); Montreux, Switzerland

Sport
- Sport: Biathlon

Jean-Marc Chabloz (born 27 May 1967) is a Swiss biathlete. He competed at the 1992, 1994, 1998 and the 2002 Winter Olympics. In 2020, he was coaching Stina Nilsson.

Since May 2020, he has worked as the shooting coach of the Swedish biathlon team alongside Johan Hagström.
