= Gustav Weder =

Swiss bobsledder (born 1961)

Medal record

Men's Bobsleigh

Representing Switzerland

Olympic Games
Gold medal – first place	1992 Albertville	Two-man
Gold medal – first place	1994 Lillehammer	Two-man
Silver medal – second place	1994 Lillehammer	Four-man
Bronze medal – third place	1992 Albertville	Four-man

World Championships
Gold medal – first place	1989 Cortina d'Ampezzo	Four-man
Gold medal – first place	1990 St. Moritz	Two-man
Gold medal – first place	1990 St. Moritz	Four-man
Gold medal – first place	1993 Igls	Four-man
Silver medal – second place	1989 Cortina d'Ampezzo	Two-man
Silver medal – second place	1991 Altenberg	Two-man
Silver medal – second place	1991 Altenberg	Four-man
Silver medal – second place	1993 Igls	Two-man

World Cup Championships
Gold medal – first place	1988-89	Combined
Gold medal – first place	1988-89	Two-man
Gold medal – first place	1990-91	Combined
Gold medal – first place	1990-91	Four-man
Silver medal – second place	1988-89	Four-man
Silver medal – second place	1990-91	Two-man
Silver medal – second place	1991-92	Combined
Silver medal – second place	1991-92	Two-man
Silver medal – second place	1991-92	Four-man
Silver medal – second place	1992-93	Combined
Silver medal – second place	1992-93	Two-man

Gustav Weder (born 2 August 1961 in Diepoldsau) is a Swiss bobsledder who competed from the late 1980s to the early 1990s. Competing in three Winter Olympics, he won four medals with two gold (Two-man: 1992, 1994), one silver (Four-man: 1994), and one bronze (Four-man: 1992).

Weder also won eight medals at the FIBT World Championships with four golds (Two-man: 1990, Four-man: 1989, 1990, 1993) and four silvers (Two-man: 1989, 1991, 1993; Four-man: 1991).

He was also a Bobsleigh World Cup champion four times (Combined men's: 1988-9, 1990-1; Two-man: 1988-9, Four-man: 1990-1).

Known for his intensity, Weder would videotape every one of his bobsleigh runs and study those videos for hours. It was so intense that Weder was caught one night during the FIBT World Championships 1990 in St. Moritz scrapping ice off a difficult corner on the track. Bobsleigh officials allowed him to compete, and he won his second world championship in the four-man event.

After studies in Switzerland and Canada, Weder finished his education with a PhD with Arnd Krüger in Social Sciences at the University of Göttingen. He has been working in Human Resources for major Swiss companies.
