= Donat Acklin =

Swiss bobsledder (born 1965)

Personal information
- Born: 6 June 1965 (age 61) Herznach, Switzerland
- Relative(s): Guido Acklin (brother); Lucia Acklin (niece)

Sport
- Sport: Bobsleigh
- Club: Bob-Club Zürichsee
Medal record
Men's Bobsleigh
Representing Switzerland
Olympic Games
Gold medal – first place	1992 Albertville	Two-man
Gold medal – first place	1994 Lillehammer	Two-man
Silver medal – second place	1994 Lillehammer	Four-man
Bronze medal – third place	1992 Albertville	Four-man
World Championships
Gold medal – first place	1993 Igls	Four-man
Silver medal – second place	1989 Cortina d'Ampezzo	Four-man
Silver medal – second place	1993 Igls	Two-man

Donat Acklin (born 6 June 1965 in Herznach) is a Swiss bobsledder who competed in the late 1980s and early 1990s. He won two Winter Olympic gold meals in 1992 and 1994.

== Career ==
Acklin rose to prominence in the late 1980s, where he placed fourth alongside Gustav Weder in the 1988 Winter Olympics two-man bobsled. The following year, he won the first of three FIBT World Championship medals in the four-man bob sled at Cortina d'Ampezzo securing silver. Returning to the 1992 games, Acklin and Weder won gold in the two-man, despite being only fifth after the first two runs. Acklin would win a bronze medal in the four-man event at the same games.

Acklin won gold and silver at the FIBT World Championships 1993 in Igls, before returning to the 1994 Winter Olympics in Lillehammer. He successfully defended the title, and won gold once again in the two-man event, beating his brother Guido Acklin who finished second. His final Olympic event yielded a silver medal in the four-man event, losing out to Germany by five tenths of a second.

== Personal life ==
Acklin was born in Herznach and is affiliated to the Bob Club Zurichsee. His brother, Guido Acklin also competed for Switzerland in bobsled. His niece is Lucia Acklin, a professional multi-event athlete who represents Switzerland.
