= FIS Nordic World Ski Championships 2021 – Individual large hill/10 km =

Individual large hill/10 km at the FIS Nordic World Ski Championships 2021
- Location: Oberstdorf, Germany
- Date: 4 March
- Competitors: 52 from 15 nations
- Winning time: 23:11.1

Medalists
gold medal	Johannes Lamparter	Austria
silver medal	Jarl Magnus Riiber	Norway
bronze medal	Akito Watabe	Japan

The Individual large hill/10 km competition at the FIS Nordic World Ski Championships 2021 was held on 4 March 2021.

== Results ==
=== Ski jumping ===
The ski jumping part was held at 11:00.

Rank	Bib	Name	Country	Distance (m)	Points	Time difference
1	46	Johannes Lamparter	Austria	138.0	153.2	
2	50	Akito Watabe	Japan	137.5	147.6	+0:22
3	52	Jarl Magnus Riiber	Norway	135.0	144.0	+0:37
4	40	Ryōta Yamamoto	Japan	131.0	143.7	+0:38
5	34	Mario Seidl	Austria	125.5	129.7	+1:34
6	6	Gašper Brecl	Slovenia	132.0	128.3	+1:40
7	38	Kristjan Ilves	Estonia	124.5	127.5	+1:43
8	33	Laurent Mühlethaler	France	125.5	126.2	+1:48
9	35	Espen Andersen	Norway	123.0	126.0	+1:49
10	49	Fabian Rießle	Germany	126.0	124.4	+1:55
11	24	Szczepan Kupczak	Poland	128.5	122.8	+2:02
12	31	Hideaki Nagai	Japan	120.0	119.9	+2:13
13	48	Eric Frenzel	Germany	122.0	119.6	+2:14
13	25	Matteo Baud	France	125.5	119.6	+2:14
15	43	Manuel Faißt	Germany	118.5	116.4	+2:27
16	36	Yoshito Watabe	Japan	117.0	114.7	+2:34
17	44	Lukas Greiderer	Austria	117.0	113.7	+2:38
18	45	Jens Lurås Oftebro	Norway	117.5	113.6	+2:38
19	47	Ilkka Herola	Finland	118.5	111.9	+2:45
20	27	Perttu Reponen	Finland	121.5	111.0	+2:49
21	41	Johannes Rydzek	Germany	116.0	109.6	+2:54
22	26	Ondřej Pažout	Czech Republic	120.5	109.5	+2:55
23	37	Lukas Klapfer	Austria	114.5	109.4	+2:55
24	30	Tomáš Portyk	Czech Republic	114.5	104.0	+3:17
25	51	Vinzenz Geiger	Germany	116.0	103.6	+3:18
26	22	Otto Niittykoski	Finland	116.5	103.0	+3:21
27	28	Jan Vytrval	Czech Republic	116.0	102.8	+3:22
28	21	Ben Loomis	United States	117.0	101.5	+3:27
29	42	Jørgen Graabak	Norway	110.5	101.0	+3:29
30	39	Eero Hirvonen	Finland	111.5	100.8	+3:30
31	23	Vid Vrhovnik	Slovenia	115.0	100.4	+3:31
32	32	Antoine Gérard	France	109.0	98.7	+3:38
33	19	Gaël Blondeau	France	114.5	94.3	+3:56
34	29	Taylor Fletcher	United States	109.0	91.4	+4:07
35	5	Andrzej Szczechowicz	Poland	108.5	83.1	+4:40
36	3	Jared Shumate	United States	103.5	80.8	+4:50
37	15	Lukáš Daněk	Czech Republic	100.5	77.1	+5:04
38	8	Dmytro Mazurchuk	Ukraine	103.0	74.6	+5:14
39	16	Park Je-un	South Korea	99.0	73.3	+5:20
40	13	Viacheslav Barkov	Russian Ski Federation	92.0	67.0	+5:45
41	11	Jasper Good	United States	93.0	63.5	+5:59
42	2	Aleksandr Milanin	Russian Ski Federation	92.0	60.3	+6:12
43	14	Eduard Zhirnov	Russian Ski Federation	88.0	54.3	+6:36
44	17	Oleksandr Shumbarets	Ukraine	89.0	53.7	+6:38
45	9	Andreas Ilves	Estonia	88.5	49.2	+6:56
46	1	Viktor Pasichnyk	Ukraine	86.5	45.1	+7:12
47	7	Chingiz Rakparov	Kazakhstan	88.0	43.6	+7:18
48	4	Samir Mastiev	Russian Ski Federation	86.0	41.5	+7:27
49	12	Magzhan Amankeldiuly	Kazakhstan	78.5	37.5	+7:43
50	10	Vitaliy Hrebeniuk	Ukraine	79.0	28.7	+8:18
51	18	Eldar Orussayev	Kazakhstan	77.5	24.9	+8:33
52	20	Vyacheslav Bochkarev	Kazakhstan	76.0	17.8	+9:02

=== Cross-country skiing ===
The cross-country skiing part was started at 15:15.

Rank	Bib	Athlete	Country	Start time	Cross-country time	Cross-country rank	Finish time	Deficit
1st place, gold medalist(s)	1	Johannes Lamparter	Austria	0:00	23:11.1	7	23:11.1	
2nd place, silver medalist(s)	3	Jarl Magnus Riiber	Norway	0:37	23:11.2	8	23:48.2	+37.1
3rd place, bronze medalist(s)	2	Akito Watabe	Japan	0:22	23:34.9	14	23:56.9	+45.8
4	13	Eric Frenzel	Germany	2:14	22:54.8	5	25:08.8	+1:57.7
5	10	Fabian Rießle	Germany	1:55	23:14.0	9	25:09.0	+1:57.9
6	19	Ilkka Herola	Finland	2:45	22:25.1	1	25:10.1	+1:59.0
7	18	Jens Lurås Oftebro	Norway	2:38	22:37.4	3	25:15.4	+2:04.3
8	9	Espen Andersen	Norway	1:49	23:32.6	11	25:21.6	+2:10.5
9	8	Laurent Mühlethaler	France	1:48	23:50.2	17	25:38.2	+2:27.1
10	4	Ryōta Yamamoto	Japan	0:38	25:04.6	38	25:42.6	+2:31.5
11	7	Kristjan Ilves	Estonia	1:43	24:04.3	18	25:47.3	+2:36.2
12	5	Mario Seidl	Austria	1:34	24:16.5	25	25:50.5	+2:39.4
13	17	Lukas Greiderer	Austria	2:38	23:21.7	10	25:59.7	+2:48.6
14	29	Jørgen Graabak	Norway	3:29	22:36.5	2	26:05.5	+2:54.4
15	25	Vinzenz Geiger	Germany	3:18	22:54.0	4	26:12.0	+3:00.9
16	14	Matteo Baud	France	2:14	24:09.7	20	26:23.7	+3:12.6
17	21	Johannes Rydzek	Germany	2:54	23:33.0	12	26:27.0	+3:15.9
18	30	Eero Hirvonen	Finland	3:30	23:04.4	6	26:34.4	+3:23.3
19	15	Manuel Faißt	Germany	2:27	24:07.8	19	26:34.8	+3:23.7
20	20	Perttu Reponen	Finland	2:49	23:48.2	15	26:37.2	+3:26.1
21	12	Hideaki Nagai	Japan	2:13	24:49.1	33	27:02.1	+3:51.0
22	27	Jan Vytrval	Czech Republic	3:22	23:48.8	16	27:10.8	+3:59.7
23	16	Yoshito Watabe	Japan	2:34	24:38.6	31	27:12.6	+4:01.5
24	22	Ondřej Pažout	Czech Republic	2:55	24:20.0	26	27:15.0	+4:03.9
25	6	Gašper Brecl	Slovenia	1:40	25:44.5	44	27:24.5	+4:13.4
26	23	Lukas Klapfer	Austria	2:55	24:29.7	29	27:24.7	+4:13.6
27	11	Szczepan Kupczak	Poland	2:02	25:28.6	42	27:30.6	+4:19.5
28	34	Taylor Fletcher	United States	4:07	23:33.7	13	27:40.7	+4:29.6
29	32	Antoine Gérard	France	3:38	24:10.2	21	27:48.2	+4:37.1
30	26	Otto Niittykoski	Finland	3:21	24:28.0	27	27:49.0	+4:37.9
31	28	Ben Loomis	United States	3:27	24:36.5	30	28:03.5	+4:52.4
32	24	Tomáš Portyk	Czech Republic	3:17	24:47.8	32	28:04.8	+4:53.7
33	31	Vid Vrhovnik	Slovenia	3:31	24:52.3	34	28:23.3	+5:12.2
34	33	Gaël Blondeau	France	3:56	25:03.6	37	28:59.6	+5:48.5
35	36	Jared Shumate	United States	4:50	24:10.6	22	29:00.6	+5:49.5
36	37	Lukáš Daněk	Czech Republic	5:04	24:13.7	24	29:17.7	+6:06.6
37	38	Dmytro Mazurchuk	Ukraine	5:14	24:28.1	28	29:42.1	+6:31.0
38	40	Viacheslav Barkov	Russian Ski Federation	5:45	24:13.0	23	29:58.0	+6:46.9
39	35	Andrzej Szczechowicz	Poland	4:40	26:01.2	45	30:41.2	+7:30.1
40	39	Park Je-un	South Korea	5:20	25:41.6	43	31:01.6	+7:50.5
41	41	Jasper Good	United States	5:59	25:14.6	40	31:13.6	+8:02.5
42	45	Andreas Ilves	Estonia	6:56	24:53.9	35	31:49.9	+8:38.8
43	46	Viktor Pasichnyk	Ukraine	7:12	24:58.4	36	32:10.4	+8:59.3
44	48	Samir Mastiev	Russian Ski Federation	7:27	25:11.3	39	32:38.3	+9:27.2
45	42	Aleksandr Milanin	Russian Ski Federation	6:12	26:43.0	46	32:55.0	+9:43.9
46	44	Oleksandr Shumbarets	Ukraine	6:38	26:43.8	47	33:21.8	+10:10.7
47	43	Eduard Zhirnov	Russian Ski Federation	6:36	26:56.4	48	33:32.4	+10:21.3
48	50	Vitaliy Hrebeniuk	Ukraine	8:18	25:28.2	41	33:46.2	+10:35.1
49	47	Chingiz Rakparov	Kazakhstan	7:18	Lapped			
50	49	Magzhan Amankeldiuly	Kazakhstan	7:43	Lapped			
51	51	Eldar Orussayev	Kazakhstan	8:33	Lapped			
52	52	Vyacheslav Bochkarev	Kazakhstan	9:02	Lapped			
