= FIS Nordic World Ski Championships 2023 – Individual normal hill/10 km =

Individual normal hill/10 km at the FIS Nordic World Ski Championships 2023
- Venue: Planica Nordic Centre
- Location: Planica, Slovenia
- Dates: 25 February
- Competitors: 50 from 15 nations
- Winning time: 24:36.3

Medalists
gold medal	Jarl Magnus Riiber	Norway
silver medal	Julian Schmid	Germany
bronze medal	Franz-Josef Rehrl	Austria

The Individual normal hill/10 km competition at the FIS Nordic World Ski Championships 2023 was held on 25 February 2023.

== Results ==
=== Ski jumping ===
The ski jumping part was held at 10:00.

Rank	Bib	Name	Country	Distance (m)	Points	Time difference
1	47	Jarl Magnus Riiber	Norway	103.5	131.1	
2	42	Ryōta Yamamoto	Japan	103.5	131.0	+0:00
3	48	Julian Schmid	Germany	104.0	124.8	+0:25
4	46	Franz-Josef Rehrl	Austria	100.0	124.7	+0:26
5	34	Martin Fritz	Austria	100.5	120.6	+0:42
6	32	Yoshito Watabe	Japan	99.0	119.4	+0:47
7	44	Kristjan Ilves	Estonia	98.0	117.9	+0:53
8	25	Marco Heinis	France	99.0	116.6	+0:58
9	40	Laurent Mühlethaler	France	97.0	114.0	+1:08
10	43	Manuel Faißt	Germany	95.0	113.5	+1:10
11	31	Akito Watabe	Japan	96.5	111.4	+1:19
12	49	Jens Lurås Oftebro	Norway	98.0	110.8	+1:21
13	33	Espen Andersen	Norway	96.5	109.5	+1:26
14	35	Eric Frenzel	Germany	98.0	109.4	+1:27
15	45	Vinzenz Geiger	Germany	92.5	108.5	+1:30
16	20	Ondřej Pažout	Czech Republic	95.0	108.3	+1:31
17	50	Johannes Lamparter	Austria	93.5	107.3	+1:35
18	10	Chingiz Rakparov	Kazakhstan	93.0	106.9	+1:37
19	38	Stefan Rettenegger	Austria	92.0	106.2	+1:40
20	37	Jørgen Graabak	Norway	95.5	105.5	+1:42
21	14	Jan Vytrval	Czech Republic	91.5	104.3	+1:47
22	27	Alessandro Pittin	Italy	93.0	104.2	+1:48
23	18	Gael Blondeau	France	93.5	103.1	+1:52
24	24	Ben Loomis	United States	92.0	102.9	+1:53
25	8	Arttu Mäkiaho	Finland	92.0	101.7	+1:58
26	5	Jiří Konvalinka	Czech Republic	91.5	101.3	+1:59
27	16	Niklas Malacinski	United States	91.0	100.6	+2:02
28	6	Matic Garbajs	Slovenia	92.0	100.5	+2:02
29	28	Samuel Costa	Italy	93.0	100.2	+2:04
30	26	Sora Yachi	Japan	94.0	99.9	+2:05
31	23	Gašper Brecl	Slovenia	90.5	99.8	+2:05
32	36	Eero Hirvonen	Finland	91.0	99.5	+2:06
33	41	Ilkka Herola	Finland	90.0	99.4	+2:07
34	15	Iacopo Bortolas	Italy	89.0	98.6	+2:10
35	29	Aaron Kostner	Italy	92.0	97.6	+2:14
36	17	Waltteri Karhumaa	Finland	89.0	94.9	+2:25
37	7	Dmytro Mazurchuk	Ukraine	88.5	92.0	+2:36
38	9	Vitaliy Hrebeniuk	Ukraine	86.0	88.4	+2:51
39	39	Matteo Baud	France	84.0	87.2	+2:56
40	21	Stephen Schumann	United States	84.5	86.5	+2:58
41	12	Andrii Pylypchuk	Ukraine	84.0	84.4	+3:07
42	22	Jared Shumate	United States	83.5	83.7	+3:10
43	4	Oleksandr Shumbarets	Ukraine	82.0	79.4	+3:27
44	13	Matija Zelnik	Slovenia	81.5	78.3	+3:31
45	3	Matic Hladnik	Slovenia	80.0	75.2	+3:44
46	2	Andrzej Szczechowicz	Poland	79.5	74.6	+3:46
47	1	Magzhan Amankeldiuly	Kazakhstan	73.0	63.3	+4:31
48	11	Markuss Vinogradovs	Latvia	69.0	50.2	+5:24
–	19	Tomáš Portyk	Czech Republic	Disqualified		
–	30	Simen Tiller	Norway	Disqualified		

=== Cross-country skiing ===
The race was started at 15:40.

Rank	Bib	Athlete	Country	Start time	Cross-country time	Cross-country rank	Finish time	Deficit
1st place, gold medalist(s)	1	Jarl Magnus Riiber	Norway	+0:00	24:36.3	18	24:36.3	
2nd place, silver medalist(s)	3	Julian Schmid	Germany	+0:25	24:30.7	16	24:55.7	+19.4
3rd place, bronze medalist(s)	4	Franz-Josef Rehrl	Austria	+0:26	24:31.3	17	24:57.3	+21.0
4	15	Vinzenz Geiger	Germany	+1:30	23:47.7	4	25:17.7	+41.4
5	10	Manuel Faißt	Germany	+1:10	24:08.4	8	25:18.4	+42.1
6	7	Kristjan Ilves	Estonia	+0:53	24:28.4	14	25:21.4	+45.1
7	19	Stefan Rettenegger	Austria	+1:40	23:44.9	3	25:24.9	+48.6
8	20	Jørgen Graabak	Norway	+1:42	23:43.3	2	25:25.3	+49.0
9	2	Ryōta Yamamoto	Japan	+0:00	25:25.4	27	25:25.4	+49.1
10	14	Eric Frenzel	Germany	+1:27	23:58.4	6	25:25.4	+49.1
11	17	Johannes Lamparter	Austria	+1:35	23:50.5	5	25:25.5	+49.2
12	9	Laurent Mühlethaler	France	+1:08	24:17.7	11	25:25.7	+49.4
13	22	Alessandro Pittin	Italy	+1:48	23:38.9	1	25:26.9	+50.6
14	5	Martin Fritz	Austria	+0:42	24:45.1	20	25:27.1	+50.8
15	11	Akito Watabe	Japan	+1:19	24:10.6	10	25:29.6	+53.3
16	12	Jens Lurås Oftebro	Norway	+1:21	24:18.3	12	25:39.3	+1:03.00
17	13	Espen Andersen	Norway	+1:26	24:18.7	13	25:44.7	+1:08.4
18	33	Ilkka Herola	Finland	+2:07	24:07.0	7	26:14.0	+1:37.7
19	32	Eero Hirvonen	Finland	+2:06	24:08.7	9	26:14.7	+1:38.4
20	29	Samuel Costa	Italy	+2:04	24:29.3	15	26:33.3	+1:57.0
21	16	Ondřej Pažout	Czech Republic	+1:31	25:12.7	23	26:43.7	+2:07.4
22	25	Arttu Mäkiaho	Finland	+1:58	24:57.9	21	26:55.9	+2:19.6
23	6	Yoshito Watabe	Japan	+0:47	26:10.1	35	26:57.1	+2:20.8
24	8	Marco Heinis	France	+0:58	26:03.4	33	27:01.4	+2:25.1
25	21	Jan Vytrval	Czech Republic	+1:47	25:18.6	24	27:05.6	+2:29.3
26	23	Gael Blondeau	France	+1:52	25:20.8	25	27:12.8	+2:36.5
27	24	Ben Loomis	United States	+1:53	25:22.4	26	27:15.4	+2:39.1
28	35	Aaron Kostner	Italy	+2:14	25:07.9	22	27:21.9	+2:45.6
29	30	Sora Yachi	Japan	+2:05	25:29.2	28	27:34.2	+2:57.9
30	39	Matteo Baud	France	+2:56	24:42.6	19	27:38.6	+3:02.3
31	27	Niklas Malacinski	United States	+2:02	25:58.4	32	28:00.4	+3:24.1
32	36	Waltteri Karhumaa	Finland	+2:25	25:49.9	30	28:14.9	+3:38.6
33	34	Iacopo Bortolas	Italy	+2:10	26:05.3	34	28:15.3	+3:39.0
34	26	Jiří Konvalinka	Czech Republic	+1:59	26:37.1	36	28:36.1	+3:59.8
35	18	Chingiz Rakparov	Kazakhstan	+1:37	27:09.8	40	28:46.8	+4:10.5
36	40	Stephen Schumann	United States	+2:58	25:49.2	29	28:47.2	+4:10.9
37	42	Jared Shumate	United States	+3:10	25:53.2	31	29:03.2	+4:26.9
38	37	Dmytro Mazurchuk	Ukraine	+2:36	27:09.5	39	29:45.5	+5:09.2
39	31	Gašper Brecl	Slovenia	+2:05	27:53.0	44	29:58.0	+5:21.7
40	38	Vitaliy Hrebeniuk	Ukraine	+2:51	27:12.2	41	30:03.2	+5:26.9
41	28	Matic Garbajs	Slovenia	+2:02	28:28.2	47	30:30.2	+5:53.9
42	46	Andrzej Szczechowicz	Poland	+3:46	26:56.3	37	30:42.3	+6:06.0
43	45	Matic Hladnik	Slovenia	+3:44	27:06.0	38	30:50.0	+6:13.7
44	43	Oleksandr Shumbarets	Ukraine	+3:27	27:35.7	42	31:02.7	+6:26.4
45	41	Andrii Pylypchuk	Ukraine	+3:07	28:16.0	45	31:23.0	+6:46.7
46	44	Matija Zelnik	Slovenia	+3:31	28:19.5	46	31:50.5	+7:14.2
47	48	Markuss Vinogradovs	Latvia	+5:24	27:40.3	43	33:04.3	+8:28.0
	47	Magzhan Amankeldiuly	Kazakhstan	+4:31	Did not finish			
