= FIS Nordic World Ski Championships 2021 – Team normal hill/4 × 5 km =

Team normal hill/4 × 5 km at the FIS Nordic World Ski Championships 2021
- Location: Oberstdorf, Germany
- Date: 28 February
- Competitors: 48 from 12 nations
- Teams: 12
- Winning time: 43:57.7

Medalists
gold medal	Espen Bjørnstad; Jørgen Graabak; Jens Lurås Oftebro; Jarl Magnus Riiber	Norway
silver medal	Terence Weber; Fabian Rießle; Eric Frenzel; Vinzenz Geiger	Germany
bronze medal	Johannes Lamparter; Lukas Klapfer; Mario Seidl; Lukas Greiderer	Austria

The Team normal hill/4 × 5 km competition at the FIS Nordic World Ski Championships 2021 was held on 28 February 2021.

== Results ==
=== Ski jumping ===
The ski jumping part was started at 10:00.

Rank	Bib	Country	Distance (m)	Points	Time difference
1	10	Austria; Lukas Klapfer; Johannes Lamparter; Mario Seidl; Lukas Greiderer	100.0; 102.5; 106.0; 108.0	527.8; 126.2; 132.1; 133.9; 135.6	0:00
2	12	Germany; Fabian Rießle; Terence Weber; Vinzenz Geiger; Eric Frenzel	98.0; 99.5; 98.0; 107.0	508.8; 125.8; 124.6; 123.1; 135.3	+0:25
3	9	Japan; Hideaki Nagai; Yoshito Watabe; Akito Watabe; Ryōta Yamamoto	97.5; 96.0; 104.5; 102.5	505.5; 118.8; 118.9; 134.9; 132.9	+0:30
4	11	Norway; Espen Bjørnstad; Jarl Magnus Riiber; Jørgen Gråbak; Jens Lurås Oftebro	98.0; 100.0; 98.5; 104.0	501.5; 124.7; 128.5; 120.2; 128.1	+0:35
5	8	Finland; Perttu Reponen; Eero Hirvonen; Otto Niittykoski; Ilkka Herola	97.0; 95.5; 89.0; 101.5	460.2; 117.5; 116.1; 99.1; 127.5	+1:30
6	6	France; Matteo Baud; Gaël Blondeau; Antoine Gérard; Laurent Mühlethaler	97.0; 86.0; 88.5; 100.0	442.3; 118.0; 93.4; 104.0; 126.9	+1:54
7	7	Italy; Aaron Kostner; Raffaele Buzzi; Alessandro Pittin; Samuel Costa	98.5; 88.0; 88.5; 92.5	426.4; 121.0; 96.5; 101.2; 107.7	+2:15
8	5	Czech Republic; Tomáš Portyk; Jan Vytrval; Lukáš Daněk; Ondřej Pažout	93.5; 87.0; 88.5; 93.5	418.0; 111.1; 93.9; 100.0; 113.0	+2:26
9	4	United States; Ben Loomis; Taylor Fletcher; Jared Shumate; Niklas Malacinski	95.5; 85.5; 92.5; 83.5	400.0; 115.4; 89.0; 109.4; 86.2	+2:50
10	3	Ukraine; Viktor Pasichnyk; Dmytro Mazurchuk; Oleksandr Shumbarets; Vitaliy Hrebeniuk	75.0; 88.0; 83.0; 72.5	315.7; 71.6; 93.2; 85.1; 61.5	+4:43
11	2	Russian Ski Federation; Aleksandr Milanin; Samir Mastiev; Viacheslav Barkov; Artem Galunin	78.5; 72.5; 83.5; 80.0	308.5; 79.5; 61.5; 86.3; 81.2	+4:52
12	1	Kazakhstan; Vyacheslav Bochkarev; Eldar Orussayev; Magzhan Amankeldiuly; Chingiz Rakparov	59.0; 62.0; 71.5; 62.0	178.0; 33.4; 39.5; 62.6; 42.5	+7:46

=== Cross-country skiing ===
The cross-country skiing part was started at 15:00.

Rank	Bib	Country	Deficit	Time	Rank	Finish time	Deficit
1st place, gold medalist(s)	4	Norway; Espen Bjørnstad; Jørgen Gråbak; Jens Lurås Oftebro; Jarl Magnus Riiber	0:35	43:22.7; 10:23.8; 10:43.1; 11:03.7; 11:10.8	1	43:57.7	
2nd place, silver medalist(s)	2	Germany; Terence Weber; Fabian Rießle; Eric Frenzel; Vinzenz Geiger	0:25	44:15.4; 10:49.3; 11:00.3; 10:56.4; 11:27.7	2	44:40.4	+42.7
3rd place, bronze medalist(s)	1	Austria; Johannes Lamparter; Lukas Klapfer; Mario Seidl; Lukas Greiderer	0:00	44:46.8; 10:33.8; 11:21.4; 11:36.1; 11:13.9	3	44:46.8	+49.1
4	3	Japan; Akito Watabe; Hideaki Nagai; Yoshito Watabe; Ryōta Yamamoto	0:30	45:41.1; 10:30.1; 11:21.8; 11:52.2; 11:56.7	7	46:11.1	+2:13.4
5	5	Finland; Otto Niittykoski; Perttu Reponen; Ilkka Herola; Eero Hirvonen	1:30	45:06.4; 11:07.8; 11:25.1; 11:05.3; 11:26.8	5	46:36.4	+2:38.7
6	6	France; Antoine Gérard; Gaël Blondeau; Matteo Baud; Laurent Mühlethaler	1:54	44:58.1; 10:41.3; 11:32.5; 11:14.2; 11:28.8	4	46:52.1	+2:54.4
7	7	Italy; Raffaele Buzzi; Aaron Kostner; Samuel Costa; Alessandro Pittin	2:15	45:08.1; 10:36.3; 11:31.6; 11:24.2; 11:34.4	6	47:23.1	+3:25.4
8	8	Czech Republic; Jan Vytrval; Ondřej Pažout; Lukáš Daněk; Tomáš Portyk	2:26	45:53.0; 10:58.5; 11:23.2; 11:40.3; 11:49.5	8	48:19.0	+4:21.3
9	9	United States; Jared Shumate; Taylor Fletcher; Niklas Malacinski; Ben Loomis	2:50	46:23.8; 10:58.7; 11:18.9; 12:12.3; 11:52.0	9	49:13.8	+5:16.1
10	11	Russian Ski Federation; Aleksandr Milanin; Samir Mastiev; Viacheslav Barkov; Artem Galunin	4:52	47:33.4; 11:31.7; 11:51.3; 11:37.8; 12:30.9	10	52:25.4	+8:27.7
11	10	Ukraine; Viktor Pasichnyk; Dmytro Mazurchuk; Vitaliy Hrebeniuk; Oleksandr Shumbarets	4:43	48:00.7; 11:04.4; 12:01.8; 12:10.4; 12:42.3	11	52:43.7	+8:46.0
12	12	Kazakhstan; Chingiz Rakparov; Magzhan Amankeldiuly; Eldar Orussayev; Vyacheslav Bochkarev	7:46	53:52.1; 12:10.0; 13:04.7; 13:42.2; 14:52.7	12	1:01:38.1	+17:40.4
