= FIS Nordic World Ski Championships 2023 – Individual large hill/10 km =

Individual large hill/10 km at the FIS Nordic World Ski Championships 2023
- Venue: Planica Nordic Centre
- Location: Planica, Slovenia
- Dates: 4 March
- Competitors: 48 from 14 nations
- Winning time: 23:42.6

Medalists
gold medal	Jarl Magnus Riiber	Norway
silver medal	Jens Lurås Oftebro	Norway
bronze medal	Johannes Lamparter	Austria

The Individual large hill/10 km competition at the FIS Nordic World Ski Championships 2023 was held on 4 March 2023.

== Results ==
=== Ski jumping ===
The ski jumping part was held at 10:30.

Rank	Bib	Name	Country	Distance (m)	Points	Time difference
1	45	Jarl Magnus Riiber	Norway	147.0	152.6	
2	41	Ryota Yamamoto	Japan	140.0	143.7	+0:36
3	43	Kristjan Ilves	Estonia	139.5	137.0	+1:02
4	46	Julian Schmid	Germany	131.0	131.5	+1:24
5	48	Johannes Lamparter	Austria	130.0	131.2	+1:26
6	47	Jens Lurås Oftebro	Norway	131.0	129.4	+1:33
7	38	Matteo Baud	France	134.5	126.3	+1:45
8	37	Stefan Rettenegger	Austria	133.5	125.1	+1:50
9	33	Martin Fritz	Austria	131.0	119.3	+2:13
10	44	Vinzenz Geiger	Germany	126.0	118.7	+2:16
11	31	Espen Andersen	Norway	131.0	117.9	+2:19
12	32	Lukas Greiderer	Austria	130.5	116.1	+2:26
13	39	Laurent Mühlethaler	France	127.0	115.8	+2:27
14	22	Marco Heinis	France	126.0	112.1	+2:42
15	35	Eero Hirvonen	Finland	127.5	111.9	+2:43
16	29	Yoshito Watabe	Japan	127.0	111.2	+2:46
17	28	Akito Watabe	Japan	126.0	110.5	+2:48
18	34	Johannes Rydzek	Germany	127.5	110.3	+2:49
19	40	Ilkka Herola	Finland	126.0	110.2	+2:50
20	36	Jørgen Graabak	Norway	124.5	108.1	+2:58
21	5	Jiří Konvalinka	Czech Republic	124.0	105.2	+3:10
22	8	Matic Garbajs	Slovenia	121.5	103.6	+3:16
22	25	Samuel Costa	Italy	122.5	103.6	+3:16
24	23	Sora Yachi	Japan	123.0	103.2	+3:18
25	42	Manuel Faißt	Germany	120.0	101.0	+3:26
26	20	Gašper Brecl	Slovenia	120.0	99.4	+3:33
27	26	Antoine Gérard	France	119.0	99.0	+3:34
28	17	Ondřej Pažout	Czech Republic	121.0	97.5	+3:40
29	11	Jan Vytrval	Czech Republic	119.0	95.0	+3:50
30	16	Otto Niittykoski	Finland	119.0	94.9	+3:51
31	4	Chingiz Rakparov	Kazakhstan	117.0	90.8	+4:07
32	24	Raffaele Buzzi	Italy	116.5	90.1	+4:10
33	21	Ben Loomis	United States	115.5	89.1	+4:14
34	12	Iacopo Bortolas	Italy	114.0	87.8	+4:19
35	15	Tomáš Portyk	Czech Republic	113.0	85.3	+4:29
36	30	Thomas Rettenegger	Austria	117.5	83.6	+4:36
37	13	Niklas Malacinski	United States	111.0	83.2	+4:38
38	14	Waltteri Karhumaa	Finland	109.0	80.2	+4:50
39	27	Aaron Kostner	Italy	110.0	77.9	+4:59
40	19	Jared Shumate	United States	107.5	76.4	+5:05
41	3	Matija Zelnik	Slovenia	105.0	73.6	+5:16
42	1	Andrii Pylypchuk	Ukraine	108.5	73.4	+5:17
43	18	Stephen Schumann	United States	105.0	70.5	+5:28
44	9	Oleksandr Shumbarets	Ukraine	105.0	70.1	+5:30
45	10	Dmytro Mazurchuk	Ukraine	108.0	69.3	+5:33
46	2	Vitaliy Hrebeniuk	Ukraine	99.0	63.0	+5:58
47	7	Andrzej Szczechowicz	Poland	99.0	54.8	+6:31
48	6	Magzhan Amankeldiuly	Kazakhstan	95.5	51.0	+6:46

=== Cross-country skiing ===
The cross-country skiing part was held at 15:00.

Rank	Bib	Athlete	Country	Start time	Cross-country time	Cross-country rank	Finish time	Deficit
1st place, gold medalist(s)	1	Jarl Magnus Riiber	Norway	+0:00	23:42.6	11	23:42.6	
2nd place, silver medalist(s)	6	Jens Lurås Oftebro	Norway	+1:33	23:11.0	5	24:44.0	+1:01.4
3rd place, bronze medalist(s)	5	Johannes Lamparter	Austria	+1:26	23:21.3	6	24:47.3	+1:04.7
4	3	Kristjan Ilves	Estonia	+1:02	23:49.6	=16	24:51.6	+1:09.0
5	8	Stefan Rettenegger	Austria	+1:50	23:02.8	3	24:52.8	+1:10.2
6	4	Julian Schmid	Germany	+1:24	23:49.6	=16	25:13.6	+1:31.0
7	7	Matteo Baud	France	+1:45	23:32.0	7	25:17.0	+1:34.4
8	20	Jørgen Graabak	Norway	+2:58	22:48.4	1	25:46.4	+2:03.8
9	19	Ilkka Herola	Finland	+2:50	22:57.0	2	25:47.0	+2:04.4
10	2	Ryota Yamamoto	Japan	+0:36	25:12.5	35	25:48.5	+2:05.9
11	15	Eero Hirvonen	Finland	+2:43	23:07.4	4	25:50.4	+2:07.8
12	11	Espen Andersen	Norway	+2:19	23:35.2	9	25:54.2	+2:11.6
13	13	Laurent Mühlethaler	France	+2:27	23:33.4	8	26:00.4	+2:17.8
14	10	Vinzenz Geiger	Germany	+2:16	23:48.3	15	26:04.3	+2:21.7
15	12	Lukas Greiderer	Austria	+2:26	23:41.6	10	26:07.6	+2:25.0
16	18	Johannes Rydzek	Germany	+2:49	23:43.5	12	26:32.5	+2:49.9
17	9	Martin Fritz	Austria	+2:13	24:20.1	22	26:33.1	+2:50.5
18	17	Akito Watabe	Japan	+2:48	23:46.7	14	26:34.7	+2:52.1
19	22	Samuel Costa	Italy	+3:16	23:51.7	20	27:07.7	+3:25.1
20	25	Manuel Faißt	Germany	+3:26	23:45.1	13	27:11.1	+3:28.5
21	14	Marco Heinis	France	+2:42	25:03.1	32	27:45.1	+4:02.5
22	27	Antoine Gérard	France	+3:34	24:12.7	21	27:46.7	+4:04.1
23	16	Yoshito Watabe	Japan	+2:46	25:09.2	33	27:55.2	+4:12.6
24	32	Raffaele Buzzi	Italy	+4:10	23:51.1	19	28:01.1	+4:18.5
25	24	Sora Yachi	Japan	+3:18	24:52.4	27	28:10.4	+4:27.8
26	28	Ondřej Pažout	Czech Republic	+3:40	24:40.8	24	28:20.8	+4:38.2
27	29	Jan Vytrval	Czech Republic	+3:50	24:43.2	25	28:33.2	+4:50.6
28	21	Jiří Konvalinka	Czech Republic	+3:10	25:26.6	36	28:36.6	+4:54.0
29	30	Otto Niittykoski	Finland	+3:51	24:54.8	29	28:45.8	+5:03.2
30	39	Aaron Kostner	Italy	+4:59	23:50.6	18	28:49.6	+5:07.0
31	33	Ben Loomis	United States	+4:14	24:55.7	30	29:09.7	+5:27.1
32	35	Tomáš Portyk	Czech Republic	+4:29	24:44.1	26	29:13.1	+5:30.5
33	38	Waltteri Karhumaa	Finland	+4:50	24:27.7	23	29:17.7	+5:35.1
34	34	Iacopo Bortolas	Italy	+4:19	25:02.9	31	29:21.9	+5:39.3
35	36	Thomas Rettenegger	Austria	+4:36	24:52.8	28	29:28.8	+5:46.2
36	31	Chingiz Rakparov	Kazakhstan	+4:07	25:35.7	37	29:42.7	+6:00.1
37	26	Gašper Brecl	Slovenia	+3:33	26:18.7	42	29:51.7	+6:09.1
38	37	Niklas Malacinski	United States	+4:38	25:43.5	39	30:21.5	+6:38.9
39	43	Stephen Schumann	United States	+5:28	25:11.7	34	30:39.7	+6:57.1
40	40	Jared Shumate	United States	+5:05	25:45.8	40	30:50.8	+7:08.2
41	45	Dmytro Mazurchuk	Ukraine	+5:33	25:36.1	38	31:09.1	+7:26.5
42	23	Matic Garbajs	Slovenia	+3:16	28:03.0	46	31:19.0	+7:36.4
43	44	Oleksandr Shumbarets	Ukraine	+5:30	26:39.8	44	32:09.8	+8:27.2
44	46	Vitaliy Hrebeniuk	Ukraine	+5:58	26:26.9	43	32:24.9	+8:42.3
45	41	Matija Zelnik	Slovenia	+5:16	27:20.0	45	32:36.0	+8:53.4
46	47	Andrzej Szczechowicz	Poland	+6:11	26:09.5	41	32:40.5	+8:57.9
47	42	Andrii Pylypchuk	Ukraine	+5:17	28:21.3	47	33:38.3	+9:55.7
	48	Magzhan Amankeldiuly	Kazakhstan	+6:46	Did not start			
