= FIS Nordic World Ski Championships 2023 – Team large hill/4 × 5 km =

Team large hill/4 × 5 km at the FIS Nordic World Ski Championships 2023
- Venue: Planica Nordic Centre
- Location: Planica, Slovenia
- Dates: 1 March
- Competitors: 44 from 11 nations
- Teams: 11
- Winning time: 47:20.4

Medalists
gold medal	Espen Andersen; Jens Lurås Oftebro; Jørgen Graabak; Jarl Magnus Riiber	Norway
silver medal	Eric Frenzel; Vinzenz Geiger; Johannes Rydzek; Julian Schmid	Germany
bronze medal	Martin Fritz; Lukas Greiderer; Stefan Rettenegger; Johannes Lamparter	Austria

The Team large hill/4 × 5 km competition at the FIS Nordic World Ski Championships 2023 was held on 1 March 2023.

== Results ==
=== Ski jumping ===
The ski jumping part was held at 11:00.

Rank	Bib	Country	Distance (m)	Points	Time difference
1	9	Norway; Jørgen Graabak; Jarl Magnus Riiber; Espen Andersen; Jens Lurås Oftebro	120.0; 139.0; 126.0; 127.5	478.0; 102.3; 144.8; 114.2; 116.7	0:00
2	10	Austria; Martin Fritz; Stefan Rettenegger; Lukas Greiderer; Johannes Lamparter	120.0; 121.0; 130.0; 130.0	458.1; 106.3; 107.3; 123.3; 121.2	+0:20
3	11	Germany; Johannes Rydzek; Eric Frenzel; Vinzenz Geiger; Julian Schmid	115.0; 123.5; 125.5; 137.0	455.3; 97.0; 110.3; 119.7; 128.3	+0:23
4	7	France; Marco Heinis; Laurent Mühlethaler; Antoine Gérard; Matteo Baud	121.0; 115.5; 119.0; 131.0	438.1; 101.3; 103.3; 107.6; 125.9	+0:40
5	6	Japan; Yoshito Watabe; Yuya Yamamoto; Sora Yachi; Ryōta Yamamoto	123.5; 107.5; 112.0; 128.0	403.0; 104.3; 80.8; 91.4; 126.5	+1:15
6	8	Finland; Arttu Mäkiaho; Otto Niittykoski; Eero Hirvonen; Ilkka Herola	113.5; 109.5; 123.5; 123.5	396.9; 91.1; 83.7; 109.8; 112.3	+1:21
7	5	Italy; Samuel Costa; Iacopo Bortolas; Aaron Kostner; Raffaele Buzzi	117.0; 110.0; 111.0; 112.0	349.6; 84.5; 84.3; 91.0; 89.8	+2:08
8	2	Czech Republic; Jiří Konvalinka; Tomáš Portyk; Jan Vytrval; Ondřej Pažout	118.5; 104.5; 110.0; 111.5	343.0; 88.7; 77.1; 84.4; 92.8	+2:15
9	4	United States; Niklas Malacinski; Stephen Schumann; Jared Shumate; Ben Loomis	120.0; 101.0; 103.5; 113.0	336.9; 92.5; 67.2; 76.3; 100.9	+2:21
10	3	Slovenia; Matic Garbajs; Matic Hladnik; Matija Zelnik; Gašper Brecl	129.5; 88.0; 103.5; 109.0	322.8; 111.0; 44.7; 76.0; 91.1	+2:35
11	1	Ukraine; Dmytro Mazurchuk; Oleksandr Shumbarets; Andrii Pylypchuk; Vitaliy Hrebeniuk	115.0; 105.5; 107.5; 94.0	299.0; 79.1; 82.4; 76.0; 61.5	+2:59

=== Cross-country skiing ===
The cross-country skiing part was started at 15:00.

Rank	Bib	Country	Deficit	Time	Rank	Finish time	Deficit
1st place, gold medalist(s)	1	Norway; Espen Andersen; Jens Lurås Oftebro; Jørgen Graabak; Jarl Magnus Riiber	0:00	47:20.4; 11:50.4; 11:48.3; 11:43.8; 11:57.9	4	47:20.4	
2nd place, silver medalist(s)	3	Germany; Eric Frenzel; Vinzenz Geiger; Johannes Rydzek; Julian Schmid	0:23	47:06.4; 11:26.8; 11:49.3; 11:43.2; 12:07.1	1	47:29.4	+9.0
3rd place, bronze medalist(s)	2	Austria; Martin Fritz; Lukas Greiderer; Stefan Rettenegger; Johannes Lamparter	0:20	47:09.7; 11:57.8; 11:53.1; 11:35.0; 11:43.8	2	47:29.7	+9.3
4	4	France; Matteo Baud; Antoine Gérard; Laurent Mühlethaler; Marco Heinis	0:40	47:13.6; 11:49.2; 11:47.2; 11:27.3; 12:09.9	3	47:53.6	+33.2
5	6	Finland; Ilkka Herola; Arttu Mäkiaho; Otto Niittykoski; Eero Hirvonen	1:21	48:00.3; 11:37.8; 12:02.4; 11:56.7; 12:23.4	6	49:21.3	+2:00.9
6	7	Italy; Samuel Costa; Aaron Kostner; Iacopo Bortolas; Raffaele Buzzi	2:08	47:42.9; 11:43.5; 11:45.0; 12:13.2; 12:01.2	5	49:50.9	+2:30.5
7	5	Japan; Sora Yachi; Yoshito Watabe; Yuya Yamamoto; Ryōta Yamamoto	1:15	48:47.5; 12:06.9; 12:23.5; 12:03.4; 12:13.7	7	50:02.5	+2:42.1
8	9	United States; Stephen Schumann; Ben Loomis; Niklas Malacinski; Jared Shumate	2:21	49:02.6; 12:10.8; 12:15.1; 12:34.1; 12:02.6	8	51:23.6	+4:03.2
9	8	Czech Republic; Tomáš Portyk; Jan Vytrval; Jiří Konvalinka; Ondřej Pažout	2:15	49:19.6; 12:13.1; 12:17.4; 12:53.0; 11:56.1	9	51:34.6	+4:14.2
10	11	Ukraine; Vitaliy Hrebeniuk; Oleksandr Shumbarets; Dmytro Mazurchuk; Andrii Pylypchuk	2:59	51:35.5; 12:45.3; 13:00.5; 12:28.7; 13:21.0	10	54:34.5	+7:14.1
11	10	Slovenia; Matic Hladnik; Gašper Brecl; Matija Zelnik; Matic Garbajs	2:35	54:30.1; 13:24.6; 13:13.3; 14:04.9; 13:47.3	11	57:05.1	+9:44.7
