= FIS Nordic World Ski Championships 2019 – Individual large hill/10 km =

Skiing competition

Individual large hill/10 km at the FIS Nordic World Ski Championships 2019
- Location: Seefeld in Tirol, Austria
- Dates: 22 February
- Competitors: 59 from 18 nations
- Winning time: 23:43.0

Medalists
gold medal	Eric Frenzel	Germany
silver medal	Jan Schmid	Norway
bronze medal	Franz-Josef Rehrl	Austria

The Individual large hill/10 km competition at the FIS Nordic World Ski Championships 2019 was held on 22 February 2019.

== Results ==
=== Ski jumping ===
The ski jumping part was held at 10:30.

Rank	Bib	Name	Country	Distance (m)	Points	Time difference
1	49	Eric Frenzel	Germany	130.5	138.5	
2	54	Mario Seidl	Austria	125.5	137.2	+0:05
3	47	Jan Schmid	Norway	129.0	136.1	+0:10
4	56	Franz-Josef Rehrl	Austria	126.0	135.9	+0:10
5	58	Akito Watabe	Japan	122.5	129.0	+0:38
6	52	Fabian Rießle	Germany	121.0	128.7	+0:39
7	45	Yoshito Watabe	Japan	124.0	125.8	+0:51
8	36	Szczepan Kupczak	Poland	124.0	125.3	+0:53
9	40	Antoine Gérard	France	124.0	124.0	+0:58
10	59	Jarl Magnus Riiber	Norway	121.0	123.8	+0:59
11	51	Espen Bjørnstad	Norway	120.5	123.0	+1:02
12	46	Lukas Klapfer	Austria	121.5	120.6	+1:12
13	57	Johannes Rydzek	Germany	117.5	119.8	+1:15
14	44	Gō Yamamoto	Japan	119.5	118.8	+1:19
15	55	Vinzenz Geiger	Germany	117.0	118.0	+1:22
16	39	Hideaki Nagai	Japan	121.0	117.2	+1:25
17	50	Manuel Faißt	Germany	115.5	115.5	+1:32
17	23	Aaron Kostner	Italy	123.5	115.5	+1:32
19	41	Bernhard Gruber	Austria	116.5	112.6	+1:44
20	48	Ilkka Herola	Finland	117.0	110.8	+1:51
21	37	Samuel Costa	Italy	117.5	109.6	+1:56
22	29	Tim Hug	Switzerland	119.0	108.8	+1:59
23	34	Leevi Mutru	Finland	118.5	106.2	+2:09
24	38	François Braud	France	116.0	105.4	+2:12
24	32	Maxime Laheurte	France	116.5	105.4	+2:12
26	30	Ernest Yahin	Russia	116.0	104.6	+2:16
27	42	Eero Hirvonen	Finland	111.0	103.9	+2:18
28	53	Jørgen Gråbak	Norway	108.5	103.7	+2:19
29	33	Arttu Mäkiaho	Finland	116.0	103.1	+2:22
30	24	Vid Vrhovnik	Slovenia	117.5	102.1	+2:26
31	27	Paweł Słowiok	Poland	111.0	98.1	+2:42
32	3	Ondřej Pažout	Czech Republic	112.0	95.9	+2:50
33	26	Adam Cieślar	Poland	109.5	95.1	+2:54
34	4	Alexander Pashaev	Russia	111.0	94.8	+2:55
35	28	Laurent Muhlethaler	France	110.5	93.5	+3:00
36	35	Tomáš Portyk	Czech Republic	110.5	92.6	+3:04
37	21	Jan Vytrval	Czech Republic	110.0	91.6	+3:08
38	43	Alessandro Pittin	Italy	105.0	90.9	+3:10
39	14	Nathaniel Mah	Canada	107.5	88.1	+3:22
40	31	Taylor Fletcher	United States	106.5	87.0	+3:26
41	2	Ožbej Jelen	Slovenia	110.5	86.7	+3:27
42	11	Vitalii Ivanov	Russia	108.0	85.9	+3:30
43	18	Viktor Pasichnyk	Ukraine	100.0	85.3	+3:33
44	5	Lukáš Daněk	Czech Republic	106.0	84.4	+3:36
45	20	Ben Loomis	United States	104.0	83.8	+3:39
46	9	Grant Andrews	United States	103.0	82.4	+3:44
47	6	Viacheslav Barkov	Russia	107.0	82.3	+3:45
48	22	Raffaele Buzzi	Italy	105.5	80.5	+3:52
49	25	Kristjan Ilves	Estonia	118.5	80.0	+3:54
50	17	Dmytro Mazurchuk	Ukraine	99.0	77.8	+4:03
51	16	Paweł Twardosz	Poland	99.5	75.2	+4:13
52	19	Jasper Good	United States	97.5	73.2	+4:21
53	13	Chingiz Rakparov	Kazakhstan	99.0	66.3	+4:49
54	8	Zhao Jiawen	China	94.5	60.7	+5:11
55	10	Zhao Zihe	China	86.0	43.8	+6:19
56	12	Eldar Orussayev	Kazakhstan	86.0	40.6	+6:32
57	15	Danil Glukhov	Kazakhstan	79.0	33.6	+7:00
58	1	Vyacheslav Bochkarev	Kazakhstan	77.0	26.8	+7:27
	7	Sun Jianping	China	Disqualified		

=== Cross-country skiing ===
The cross-country skiing part was held at 16:15.

Rank	Bib	Athlete	Country	Start time	Cross-country time	Cross-country rank	Finish time	Deficit
1st place, gold medalist(s)	1	Eric Frenzel	Germany	0:00	23:43.0	16	23:43.0	
2nd place, silver medalist(s)	3	Jan Schmid	Norway	0:10	23:37.3	13	23:47.3	+4.3
3rd place, bronze medalist(s)	4	Franz-Josef Rehrl	Austria	0:10	23:41.7	15	23:51.7	+8.7
4	10	Jarl Magnus Riiber	Norway	0:59	23:04.9	4	24:03.9	+20.9
5	5	Akito Watabe	Japan	0:38	23:27.0	9	24:05.0	+22.0
6	6	Fabian Rießle	Germany	0:39	23:26.3	8	24:05.3	+22.3
7	9	Antoine Gérard	France	0:58	23:14.6	5	24:12.6	+29.6
8	13	Johannes Rydzek	Germany	1:15	23:04.1	3	24:19.1	+36.1
9	19	Bernhard Gruber	Austria	1:44	22:57.6	1	24:41.6	+58.6
10	20	Ilkka Herola	Finland	1:51	23:01.3	2	24:52.3	+1:09.3
11	15	Vinzenz Geiger	Germany	1:22	23:34.2	12	24:56.2	+1:13.2
12	18	Aaron Kostner	Italy	1:32	23:28.9	10	25:00.9	+1:17.9
13	17	Manuel Faißt	Germany	1:32	23:29.5	11	25:01.5	+1:18.5
14	11	Espen Bjørnstad	Norway	1:02	24:10.8	24	25:12.8	+1:29.8
15	7	Yoshito Watabe	Japan	0:51	24:23.7	27	25:14.7	+1:31.7
16	16	Hideaki Nagai	Japan	1:25	23:59.9	21	25:24.9	+1:41.9
17	21	Samuel Costa	Italy	1:56	23:40.4	14	25:36.4	+1:53.4
18	22	Tim Hug	Switzerland	1:59	23:53.7	19	25:52.7	+2:09.7
19	27	Eero Hirvonen	Finland	2:18	23:45.1	17	26:03.1	+2:20.1
20	23	Leevi Mutru	Finland	2:09	23:58.8	20	26:07.8	+2:24.8
21	38	Alessandro Pittin	Italy	3:10	23:15.4	6	26:25.4	+2:42.4
22	29	Arttu Mäkiaho	Finland	2:22	24:04.0	23	26:26.0	+2:43.0
23	25	Maxime Laheurte	France	2:12	24:15.1	25	26:27.1	+2:44.1
24	8	Szczepan Kupczak	Poland	0:53	25:34.6	42	26:27.6	+2:44.6
25	14	Gō Yamamoto	Japan	1:19	25:12.6	37	26:31.6	+2:48.6
26	24	François Braud	France	2:12	24:39.8	32	26:51.8	+3:08.8
27	35	Laurent Muhlethaler	France	3:00	24:02.3	22	27:02.3	+3:19.3
28	30	Vid Vrhovnik	Slovenia	2:26	24:41.6	33	27:07.6	+3:24.6
29	31	Paweł Słowiok	Poland	2:42	24:31.8	30	27:13.8	+3:30.8
30	12	Lukas Klapfer	Austria	1:12	26:03.5	46	27:15.5	+3:32.5
31	48	Raffaele Buzzi	Italy	3:52	23:24.2	7	27:16.2	+3:33.2
32	36	Tomáš Portyk	Czech Republic	3:04	24:31.4	29	27:35.4	+3:52.4
33	33	Adam Cieślar	Poland	2:54	24:42.4	34	27:36.4	+3:53.4
34	40	Taylor Fletcher	United States	3:26	24:22.5	26	27:48.5	+4:05.5
35	37	Jan Vytrval	Czech Republic	3:08	24:43.9	35	27:51.9	+4:08.9
36	42	Vitalii Ivanov	Russia	3:30	24:25.5	28	27:55.5	+4:12.5
37	26	Ernest Yahin	Russia	2:16	25:43.4	43	27:59.4	+4:16.4
38	44	Lukáš Daněk	Czech Republic	3:36	24:45.5	36	28:21.5	+4:38.5
39	32	Ondřej Pažout	Czech Republic	2:50	25:31.8	40	28:21.8	+4:38.8
40	47	Viacheslav Barkov	Russia	3:45	24:36.8	31	28:21.8	+4:38.8
41	43	Viktor Pasichnyk	Ukraine	3:33	25:23.3	38	28:56.3	+5:13.3
42	34	Alexander Pashaev	Russia	2:55	26:10.6	47	29:05.6	+5:22.6
43	45	Ben Loomis	United States	3:39	25:33.7	41	29:12.7	+5:29.7
44	41	Ožbej Jelen	Slovenia	3:27	26:01.4	45	29:28.4	+5:45.4
45	50	Dmytro Mazurchuk	Ukraine	4:03	25:29.3	39	29:32.3	+5:49.3
46	52	Jasper Good	United States	4:21	25:47.1	44	30:08.1	+6:25.1
47	46	Grant Andrews	United States	3:44	26:51.8	50	30:35.8	+6:52.8
48	51	Paweł Twardosz	Poland	4:13	26:25.3	49	30:38.3	+6:55.3
49	39	Nathaniel Mah	Canada	3:22	27:33.3	51	30:55.3	+7:12.3
50	53	Chingiz Rakparov	Kazakhstan	4:49	26:20.3	48	31:09.3	+7:26.3
51	54	Zhao Jiawen	China	5:11	27:50.8	52	33:01.8	+9:18.8
52	55	Zhao Zihe	China	6:19	28:55.3	53	35:14.3	+11:31.3
53	57	Danil Glukhov	Kazakhstan	7:00	30:50.0	54	37:50.0	+14:07.0
54	58	Vyacheslav Bochkarev	Kazakhstan	7:27	32:18.2	55	39:45.2	+16:02.2
	28	Jørgen Gråbak	Norway	2:19	Did not start			
	49	Kristjan Ilves	Estonia	3:54	Did not start			
	56	Eldar Orussayev	Kazakhstan	6:32	Did not start			
DSQ	2	Mario Seidl	Austria	~~0:05~~	~~23:53.3~~	~~18~~	~~23:58.3~~	~~+15.3~~
