= FIS Nordic World Ski Championships 2025 – Individual normal hill/7.5 km compact =

Individual normal hill/7.5 km compact at the FIS Nordic World Ski Championships 2025
- Venue: Granåsen Ski Centre
- Location: Trondheim, Norway
- Dates: 1 March
- Competitors: 46 from 17 nations
- Winning time: 17:13.4

Medalists
| gold medal | Jarl Magnus Riiber | Norway |
| silver medal | Jens Lurås Oftebro | Norway |
| bronze medal | Vinzenz Geiger | Germany |

The Individual normal hill/7.5 km compact competition at the FIS Nordic World Ski Championships 2025 was held on 1 March 2025.

== Results ==
=== Ski jumping ===
The jumping round was started at 12:00.

| Rank | Bib | Name | Country | Distance (m) | Points | Time difference |
|---|---|---|---|---|---|---|
| 1 | 46 | Jarl Magnus Riiber | Norway | 103.5 | 150.8 | 0:00 |
| 2 | 32 | Ryōta Yamamoto | Japan | 99.5 | 143.9 | +0:06 |
| 3 | 44 | Julian Schmid | Germany | 102.0 | 141.8 | +0:12 |
| 4 | 43 | Johannes Lamparter | Austria | 103.0 | 141.5 | +0:17 |
| 5 | 38 | Martin Fritz | Austria | 100.5 | 141.2 | +0:22 |
| 6 | 45 | Vinzenz Geiger | Germany | 101.5 | 140.0 | +0:26 |
| 7 | 31 | Laurent Muhlethaler | France | 99.5 | 139.0 | +0:30 |
| 8 | 34 | Jørgen Gråbak | Norway | 98.5 | 138.2 | +0:33 |
| 9 | 25 | Akito Watabe | Japan | 100.5 | 137.3 | +0:36 |
| 10 | 36 | Franz-Josef Rehrl | Austria | 101.5 | 136.5 | +0:38 |
| 11 | 39 | Johannes Rydzek | Germany | 97.5 | 135.3 | +0:40 |
| 12 | 26 | Sora Yachi | Japan | 97.0 | 135.2 | +0:42 |
| 13 | 28 | Ben Loomis | United States | 99.5 | 134.4 | +0:44 |
| 14 | 40 | Stefan Rettenegger | Austria | 98.5 | 133.0 | +0:46 |
| 15 | 41 | Ilkka Herola | Finland | 97.0 | 132.4 | +0:48 |
| 16 | 42 | Jens Lurås Oftebro | Norway | 99.5 | 132.3 | +0:50 |
| 17 | 12 | Pascal Müller | Switzerland | 98.5 | 129.7 | +0:52 |
| 18 | 14 | Jiří Konvalinka | Czech Republic | 96.0 | 129.0 | +0:54 |
| 19 | 10 | Zhao Jiawen | China | 98.5 | 126.8 | +0:56 |
| 20 | 37 | Kristjan Ilves | Estonia | 95.0 | 126.0 | +0:58 |
| 21 | 19 | Wille Karhumaa | Finland | 97.0 | 124.8 | +1:00 |
| 22 | 35 | Manuel Faißt | Germany | 93.0 | 124.7 | +1:05 |
| 23 | 7 | Shogo Azegami | Japan | 92.0 | 121.8 | +1:05 |
| 24 | 18 | Raffaele Buzzi | Italy | 93.5 | 121.5 | +1:05 |
| 25 | 27 | Aaron Kostner | Italy | 90.5 | 120.5 | +1:10 |
| 26 | 24 | Eero Hirvonen | Finland | 92.5 | 119.7 | +1:10 |
| 27 | 30 | Niklas Malacinski | United States | 92.5 | 119.5 | +1:10 |
| 28 | 20 | Jan Vytrval | Czech Republic | 94.0 | 119.3 | +1:15 |
| 29 | 9 | Oleksandr Shumbarets | Ukraine | 90.5 | 115.9 | +1:15 |
| 30 | 8 | Herman Happonen | Finland | 95.0 | 115.0 | +1:15 |
| 31 | 23 | Gaël Blondeau | France | 91.0 | 114.7 | +1:20 |
| 32 | 16 | Alessandro Pittin | Italy | 90.5 | 113.2 | +1:20 |
| 33 | 13 | Gašper Brecl | Slovenia | 87.5 | 112.8 | +1:20 |
| 34 | 29 | Einar Lurås Oftebro | Norway | 90.0 | 112.5 | +1:25 |
| 35 | 22 | Vid Vrhovnik | Slovenia | 89.5 | 109.8 | +1:25 |
| 36 | 2 | Paweŀ Szyndlar | Poland | 87.5 | 109.6 | +1:25 |
| 37 | 17 | Edgar Vallet | France | 91.5 | 108.8 | +1:30 |
| 38 | 33 | Andreas Skoglund | Norway | 89.0 | 108.5 | +1:30 |
| 39 | 15 | Dmytro Mazurchuk | Ukraine | 88.5 | 105.7 | +1:30 |
| 40 | 6 | Andrzej Waliczek | Poland | 85.0 | 101.9 | +1:30 |
| 41 | 21 | Stephen Schumann | United States | 85.0 | 100.7 | +1:30 |
| 42 | 11 | Carter Brubaker | United States | 76.5 | 86.9 | +1:30 |
| 43 | 4 | Chingiz Rakparov | Kazakhstan | 78.5 | 83.8 | +1:30 |
| 44 | 1 | Kārlis Švēde | Latvia | 69.5 | 62.8 | +1:30 |
| 45 | 5 | Ali Askar | Kazakhstan | 65.5 | 51.2 | +1:30 |
| | 3 | Manuel Senoner | Italy | NPS | | |

=== Cross-country skiing ===
The race was started at 16:00.

| Rank | Bib | Athlete | Country | Start time | Cross-country time | Cross-country rank | Finish time | Deficit |
|---|---|---|---|---|---|---|---|---|
| 1st place, gold medalist(s) | 1 | Jarl Magnus Riiber | Norway | +0:00 | 17:13.4 | 17 | 17:13.4 | |
| 2nd place, silver medalist(s) | 16 | Jens Lurås Oftebro | Norway | +0:50 | 16:24.2 | 1 | 17:14.2 | +0.8 |
| 3rd place, bronze medalist(s) | 6 | Vinzenz Geiger | Germany | +0:26 | 16:48.5 | 2 | 17:14.5 | +1.1 |
| 4 | 3 | Julian Schmid | Germany | +0:12 | 17:05.1 | 10 | 17:17.1 | +3.7 |
| 5 | 4 | Johannes Lamparter | Austria | +0:17 | 17:01.7 | 8 | 17:18.7 | +5.3 |
| 6 | 8 | Jørgen Gråbak | Norway | +0:33 | 17:05.4 | 11 | 17:38.4 | +25.0 |
| 7 | 11 | Johannes Rydzek | Germany | +0:40 | 17:00.4 | 6 | 17:40.4 | +27.0 |
| 8 | 14 | Stefan Rettenegger | Austria | +0:46 | 16:55.6 | 5 | 17:41.6 | +28.2 |
| 9 | 5 | Martin Fritz | Austria | +0:22 | 17:20.4 | 19 | 17:42.4 | +29.0 |
| 10 | 7 | Laurent Muhlethaler | France | +0:30 | 17:12.9 | 16 | 17:42.9 | +29.5 |
| 11 | 2 | Ryōta Yamamoto | Japan | +0:06 | 17:37.4 | 26 | 17:43.4 | +30.0 |
| 12 | 15 | Ilkka Herola | Finland | +0:48 | 16:55.5 | 4 | 17:43.5 | +30.1 |
| 13 | 9 | Akito Watabe | Japan | +0:36 | 17:08.0 | 12 | 17:44.0 | +30.6 |
| 14 | 10 | Franz-Josef Rehrl | Austria | +0:38 | 17:11.8 | 15 | 17:49.8 | +36.4 |
| 15 | 34 | Einar Lurås Oftebro | Norway | +1:25 | 16:52.8 | 3 | 18:17.8 | +1:04.4 |
| 16 | 26 | Eero Hirvonen | Finland | +1:10 | 17:08.9 | 13 | 18:18.9 | +1:05.5 |
| 17 | 31 | Gaël Blondeau | France | +1:20 | 17:00.6 | 7 | 18:20.6 | +1:07.2 |
| 18 | 25 | Aaron Kostner | Italy | +1:10 | 17:11.7 | 14 | 18:21.7 | +1:08.3 |
| 19 | 32 | Alessandro Pittin | Italy | +1:20 | 17:02.2 | 9 | 18:22.2 | +1:08.8 |
| 20 | 20 | Kristjan Ilves | Estonia | +0:58 | 17:25.1 | 22 | 18:23.1 | +1:09.7 |
| 21 | 13 | Ben Loomis | United States | +0:44 | 17:41.4 | 27 | 18:25.4 | +1:12.0 |
| 22 | 24 | Raffaele Buzzi | Italy | +1:05 | 17:20.5 | 20 | 18:25.5 | +1:12.1 |
| 23 | 22 | Manuel Faißt | Germany | +1:05 | 17:21.4 | 21 | 18:26.4 | +1:13.0 |
| 24 | 21 | Wille Karhumaa | Finland | +1:00 | 17:31.7 | 24 | 18:31.7 | +1:18.3 |
| 25 | 28 | Jan Vytrval | Czech Republic | +1:15 | 17:17.0 | 18 | 18:32.0 | +1:18.6 |
| 26 | 12 | Sora Yachi | Japan | +0:42 | 18:01.0 | 29 | 18:43.0 | +1:29.6 |
| 27 | 38 | Andreas Skoglund | Norway | +1:30 | 17:31.1 | 23 | 19:01.1 | +1:47.7 |
| 28 | 18 | Jiří Konvalinka | Czech Republic | +0:54 | 18:07.4 | 31 | 19:01.4 | +1:48.0 |
| 29 | 27 | Niklas Malacinski | United States | +1:10 | 17:56.1 | 28 | 19:06.1 | +1:52.7 |
| 30 | 23 | Shogo Azegami | Japan | +1:05 | 18:01.2 | 30 | 19:06.2 | +1:52.8 |
| 31 | 41 | Stephen Schumann | United States | +1:30 | 17:36.7 | 25 | 19:06.7 | +1:53.3 |
| 32 | 17 | Pascal Müller | Switzerland | +0:52 | 18:16.0 | 34 | 19:08.0 | +1:54.6 |
| 33 | 30 | Herman Happonen | Finland | +1:15 | 18:16.3 | 35 | 19:31.3 | +2:17.9 |
| 34 | 35 | Vid Vrhovnik | Slovenia | +1:25 | 18:12.5 | 32 | 19:37.5 | +2:24.1 |
| 35 | 33 | Gašper Brecl | Slovenia | +1:20 | 18:18.9 | 36 | 19:38.9 | +2:25.5 |
| 36 | 37 | Edgar Vallet | France | +1:30 | 18:12.7 | 33 | 19:42.7 | +2:29.3 |
| 37 | 39 | Dmytro Mazurchuk | Ukraine | +1:30 | 18:22.5 | 37 | 19:52.5 | +2:39.1 |
| 38 | 42 | Carter Brubaker | United States | +1:30 | 18:27.3 | 38 | 19:57.3 | +2:43.9 |
| 39 | 29 | Oleksandr Shumbarets | Ukraine | +1:15 | 18:43.9 | 39 | 19:58.9 | +2:45.5 |
| 40 | 19 | Zhao Jiawen | China | +0:56 | 19:28.2 | 42 | 20:24.2 | +3:10.8 |
| 41 | 43 | Chingiz Rakparov | Kazakhstan | +1:30 | 18:54.3 | 40 | 20:24.3 | +3:10.9 |
| 42 | 36 | Paweŀ Szyndlar | Poland | +1:25 | 19:20.3 | 41 | 20:45.3 | +3:31.9 |
| 43 | 40 | Andrzej Waliczek | Poland | +1:30 | 20:35.5 | 43 | 22:05.5 | +4:52.1 |
| 44 | 44 | Kārlis Švēde | Latvia | +1:30 | 22:05.4 | 44 | 23:35.4 | +6:22.0 |
| 45 | 45 | Ali Askar | Kazakhstan | +1:30 | 22:52.0 | 45 | 24:22.0 | +7:08.6 |
