= Nordic combined at the 2026 Winter Olympics – Team large hill/2 × 7.5 km =

Team large hill/2 × 7.5 km at the XXV Olympic Winter Games
- Nordic combined
- Venue: Predazzo Ski Jumping Stadium, Cross country and biathlon center Fabio Canal
- Date: 19 February 2026
- Competitors: 28 from 14 nations
- Teams: 14
- Winning time: 41:18.0

Medalists
1st place, gold medalist(s)		Andreas Skoglund; Jens Lurås Oftebro	Norway
2nd place, silver medalist(s)		Ilkka Herola; Eero Hirvonen	Finland
3rd place, bronze medalist(s)		Stefan Rettenegger; Johannes Lamparter	Austria

The team large hill/2 × 7.5 km competition in Nordic combined at the 2026 Winter Olympics was held on 19 February, at the Predazzo Ski Jumping Stadium (ski jumping) and Cross country and biathlon center Fabio Canal (cross-country skiing). Andreas Skoglund and Jens Lurås Oftebro of Norway won the event. Lurås Oftebro thus won all three Nordic combined events at the 2026 Winter Olympics. He became only the second athlete after Samppa Lajunen in 2002 to achieve such a sweep. Ilkka Herola and Eero Hirvonen of Finland won silver medals, and Stefan Rettenegger and Johannes Lamparter of Austria bronze. It was Skoglund's and Rettenegger's first Olympic medals.

== Background ==
The Nordic combined team event in 2026 was switched to the new format in which only two athletes for every team compete. There were no events in the World Cup before the Olympics. Norway were the 2022 Olympic champions, but four athletes per team competed then. Germany were second and Japan third.

== Results ==
=== Ski jumping ===
The ski jumping part was started at 10:00.

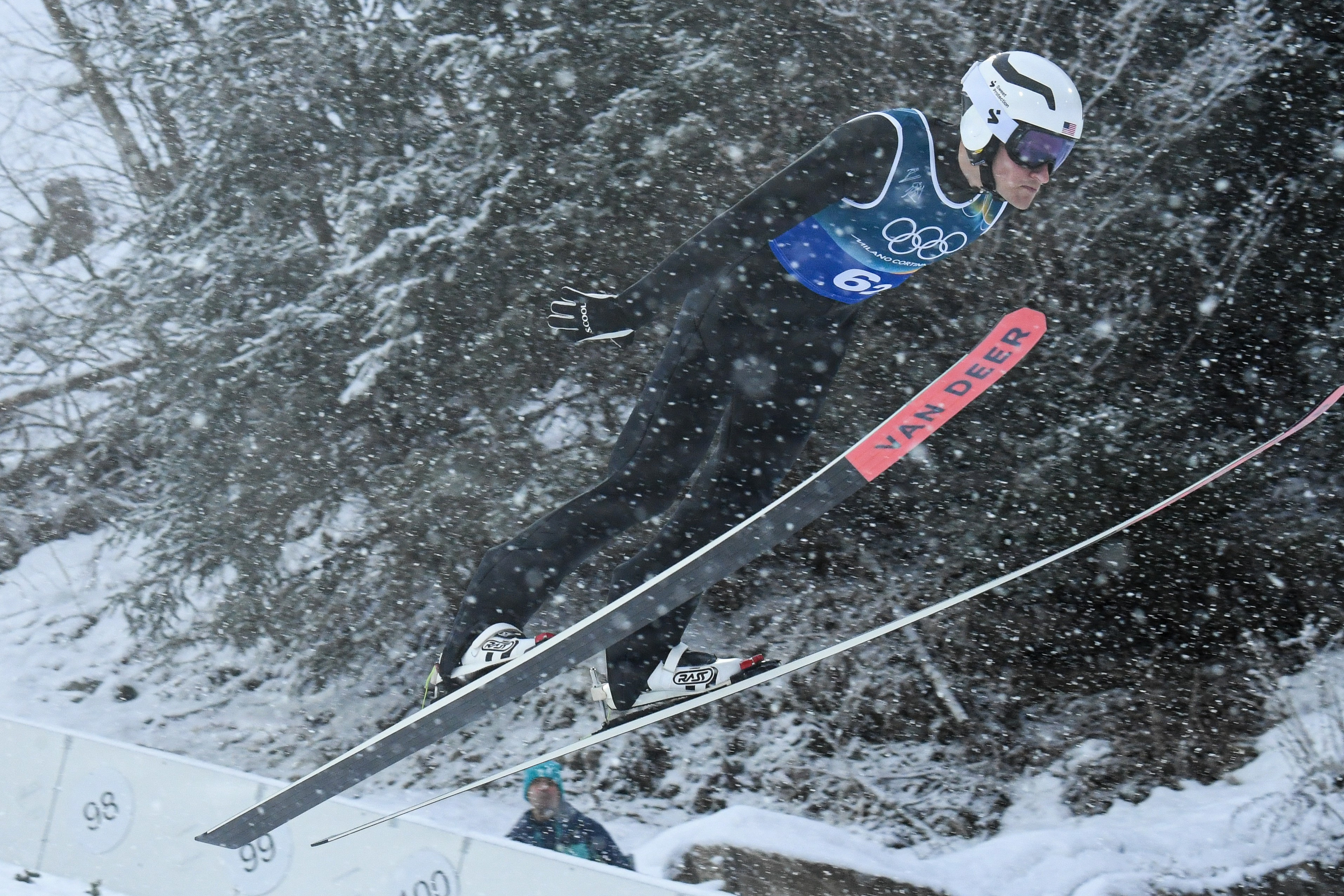
American skier Ben Loomis during the jumping session

Rank	Bib	Country	Distance (m)	Points	Time difference
1	13; 13–1; 13–2	Germany; Johannes Rydzek; Vinzenz Geiger	123.0; 125.5	246.5; 122.0; 124.5	
2	12; 12–1; 12–2	Norway; Andreas Skoglund; Jens Lurås Oftebro	124.0; 123.0	237.0; 115.9; 121.1	+0:13
3	10; 10–1; 10–2	Japan; Akito Watabe; Ryōta Yamamoto	119.0; 125.5	231.0; 108.4; 122.6	+0:21
4	11; 11–1; 11–2	Finland; Eero Hirvonen; Ilkka Herola	118.0; 126.0	226.3; 105.5; 120.8	+0:27
5	14; 14–1; 14–2	Austria; Stefan Rettenegger; Johannes Lamparter	116.0; 124.0	224.4; 100.9; 123.5	+0:29
6	9; 9–1; 9–2	France; Maël Tyrode; Marco Heinis	111.0; 124.5	222.7; 96.6; 126.1	+0:32
7	6; 6–1; 6–2	United States; Niklas Malacinski; Benjamin Loomis	120.0; 116.0	213.9; 114.1; 99.8	+0:43
8	5; 5–1; 5–2	Czech Republic; Jan Vytrval; Jiří Konvalinka	111.0; 119.0	198.9; 94.6; 104.3	+1:03
9	4; 4–1; 4–2	Slovenia; Gašper Brecl; Vid Vrhovnik	109.5; 120.5	197.8; 94.1; 103.7	+1:05
10	7; 7–1; 7–2	Estonia; Ruubert Teder; Kristjan Ilves	100.0; 127.0	191.2; 65.0; 126.2	+1:14
11	8; 8–1; 8–2	Italy; Samuel Costa; Aaron Kostner	114.0; 106.5	182.0; 100.3; 81.7	+1:26
12	3; 3–1; 3–2	China; Zhao Zihe; Zhao Jiawen	104.5; 113.0	175.9; 87.1; 88.8	+1:34
13	2; 2–1; 2–2	Poland; Kacper Jarząbek; Miłosz Krzempek	98.5; 107.0	154.2; 66.5; 87.7	+2:03
14	1; 1–1; 1–2	Ukraine; Oleksandr Shumbarets; Dmytro Mazurchuk	103.0; 93.0	129.8; 66.4; 63.4	+2:36

=== Cross-country ===
The cross-country part was started at 14:00.

Rank	Bib	Country	Start time	Cross-country		Finish time	Deficit
Rank	Bib	Country	Start time	Time	Rank	Finish time	Deficit
1st place, gold medalist(s)	2; 2–1; 2–2	Norway; Andreas Skoglund; Jens Lurås Oftebro	0:13	41:05.0; 20:44.7; 20:20.3	3	41:18.0	
2nd place, silver medalist(s)	4; 4–1; 4–2	Finland; Ilkka Herola; Eero Hirvonen	0:27	40:51.5; 20:30.2; 20:21.3	1	41:18.5	+0.5
3rd place, bronze medalist(s)	5; 5–1; 5–2	Austria; Stefan Rettenegger; Johannes Lamparter	0:29	41:11.3; 20:34.3; 20:37.0	4	41:40.3	+22.3
4	11; 11–1; 11–2	Italy; Aaron Kostner; Samuel Costa	1:26	40:55.5; 20:39.1; 20:16.4	2	42:21.5	+1:03.5
5	1; 1–1; 1–2	Germany; Johannes Rydzek; Vinzenz Geiger	0:00	42:24.1; 21:00.8; 21:23.3	5	42:24.1	+1:06.1
6	3; 3–1; 3–2	Japan; Akito Watabe; Ryōta Yamamoto	0:21	42:33.7; 21:01.2; 21:32.5	6	42:54.7	+1:36.7
7	7; 7–1; 7–2	United States; Benjamin Loomis; Niklas Malacinski	0:43	42:59.8; 22:00.0; 20:59.8	8	43:42.8	+2:24.8
8	8; 8–1; 8–2	Czech Republic; Jan Vytrval; Jiří Konvalinka	1:03	42:51.7; 21:19.9; 21:31.8	7	43:54.7	+2:36.7
9	6; 6–1; 6–2	France; Marco Heinis; Maël Tyrode	0:32	44:07.0; 21:58.4; 22:08.6	10	44:39.0	+3:21.0
10	9; 9–1; 9–2	Slovenia; Vid Vrhovnik; Gašper Brecl	1:05	44:03.7; 21:49.2; 22:14.5	9	45:08.7	+3:50.7
11	10; 10–1; 10–2	Estonia; Ruubert Teder; Kristjan Ilves	1:14	44:08.7; 23:11.7; 20:57.0	11	45:22.7	+4:04.7
12	14; 14–1; 14–2	Ukraine; Dmytro Mazurchuk; Oleksandr Shumbarets	2:36	45:09.2; 22:04.0; 23:05.2	12	47:45.2	+6:27.2
13	13; 13–1; 13–2	Poland; Miłosz Krzempek; Kacper Jarząbek	2:03	47:29.4; 24:26.8; 23:02.6	13	49:32.4	+8:14.4
14	12; 12–1; 12–2	China; Zhao Zihe; Zhao Jiawen	1:34	49:13.8; 24:44.2; 24:29.6	14	50:47.8	+9:29.8
