= FIS Nordic World Ski Championships 2025 – Individual large hill/10 km =

Individual large hill/10 km at the FIS Nordic World Ski Championships 2025
- Venue: Granåsen Ski Centre
- Location: Trondheim, Norway
- Dates: 8 March
- Competitors: 49 from 17 nations
- Winning time: 24:57.5

Medalists
gold medal	Jarl Magnus Riiber	Norway
silver medal	Jørgen Gråbak	Norway
bronze medal	Vinzenz Geiger	Germany

The Individual large hill/10 km competition at the FIS Nordic World Ski Championships 2025 was held on 8 March 2025.

== Results ==
=== Ski jumping ===
The ski jumping was started at 09:30.

Rank	Bib	Name	Country	Distance (m)	Points	Time difference
1	49	Jarl Magnus Riiber	Norway	139.0	158.5	
2	36	Ryota Yamamoto	Japan	134.0	140.1	+1:14
3	37	Espen Bjørnstad	Norway	138.5	138.8	+1:19
4	47	Julian Schmid	Germany	127.0	135.6	+1:32
5	46	Johannes Lamparter	Austria	131.5	134.6	+1:36
6	30	Simen Tiller	Norway	135.0	133.7	+1:39
7	39	Jørgen Gråbak	Norway	136.5	130.5	+1:52
8	44	Ilkka Herola	Finland	131.5	129.9	+1:54
9	48	Vinzenz Geiger	Germany	127.5	123.9	+2:18
10	38	Wendelin Thannheimer	Germany	133.0	123.4	+2:20
11	41	Kristjan Ilves	Estonia	127.0	123.1	+2:22
12	45	Jens Lurås Oftebro	Norway	133.0	122.7	+2:23
13	20	Marco Heinis	France	136.0	119.7	+2:35
14	13	Pascal Müller	Switzerland	130.0	119.5	+2:36
15	42	Johannes Rydzek	Germany	126.0	118.7	+2:39
16	40	Franz-Josef Rehrl	Austria	129.5	117.5	+2:44
17	29	Sora Yachi	Japan	132.0	117.0	+2:46
18	25	Vid Vrhovnik	Slovenia	126.0	113.4	+3:00
19	35	Laurent Muhlethaler	France	124.5	112.6	+3:04
20	31	Aaron Kostner	Italy	127.0	111.5	+3:08
21	11	Oleksandr Shumbarets	Ukraine	123.5	110.8	+3:11
22	33	Fabio Obermeyr	Austria	123.0	109.2	+3:17
23	10	Shogo Azegami	Japan	115.5	108.8	+3:19
24	43	Stefan Rettenegger	Austria	124.0	107.9	+3:22
25	15	Jiří Konvalinka	Czech Republic	117.0	107.1	+3:26
26	1	Hektor Kapustík	Slovakia	128.5	106.9	+3:26
27	12	Zhao Jiawen	China	123.0	106.5	+3:28
28	28	Akito Watabe	Japan	117.5	105.2	+3:33
29	32	Ben Loomis	United States	122.5	104.3	+3:37
30	23	Jan Vytrval	Czech Republic	117.0	103.7	+3:39
31	21	Raffaele Buzzi	Italy	119.0	103.5	+3:40
32	19	Otto Niittykoski	Finland	119.0	102.8	+3:43
33	22	Wille Karhumaa	Finland	111.5	96.2	+4:09
34	34	Niklas Malacinski	United States	111.0	89.0	+4:38
35	2	Iacopo Bortolas	Italy	114.5	87.4	+4:44
36	14	Gašper Brecl	Slovenia	114.0	86.5	+4:48
37	26	Gaël Blondeau	France	114.0	84.9	+4:54
38	16	Dmytro Mazurchuk	Ukraine	109.5	78.9	+5:18
39	24	Stephen Schumann	United States	109.0	73.3	+5:41
40	8	Ruslan Shumanskyi	Ukraine	102.0	71.6	+5:48
41	18	Edgar Vallet	France	101.0	64.1	+6:18
42	27	Eero Hirvonen	Finland	98.5	58.6	+6:40
43	3	Paweł Szyndlar	Poland	97.5	57.9	+6:42
44	9	Erik Lynch	United States	87.0	51.7	+7:07
45	7	Andrzej Waliczek	Poland	96.0	47.5	+7:24
46	17	Alessandro Pittin	Italy	89.5	41.8	+7:47
47	5	Oleksandr Shovkoplias	Ukraine	85.0	39.8	+7:55
48	4	Chingiz Rakparov	Kazakhstan	78.0	11.8	+9:47
49	6	Ali Askar	Kazakhstan	66.0	11.1	+9:50

=== Cross-country skiing ===
The cross-country skiing was started at 14:30.

Rank	Bib	Athlete	Country	Start time	Cross-country time	Cross-country rank	Finish time	Deficit
1st place, gold medalist(s)	1	Jarl Magnus Riiber	Norway	+0:00	24:57.5	13	24:57.5	
2nd place, silver medalist(s)	7	Jørgen Graabak	Norway	+1:52	24:16.2	4	26:08.2	+1:10.7
3rd place, bronze medalist(s)	9	Vinzenz Geiger	Germany	+2:18	23:50.6	2	26:08.6	+1:11.1
4	12	Jens Lurås Oftebro	Norway	+2:23	23:46.5	1	26:09.5	+1:12.0
5	8	Ilkka Herola	Finland	+1:54	24:18.9	5	26:12.9	+1:15.4
6	4	Julian Schmid	Germany	+1:32	24:53.1	11	26:25.1	+1:27.6
7	5	Johannes Lamparter	Austria	+1:36	24:50.6	9	26:26.6	+1:29.1
8	2	Ryota Yamamoto	Japan	+1:14	26:01.1	27	27:15.1	+2:17.6
9	6	Simen Tiller	Norway	+1:39	25:40.0	26	27:19.0	+2:21.5
10	10	Wendelin Thannheimer	Germany	+2:20	25:03.1	16	27:23.1	+2:25.6
11	11	Kristjan Ilves	Estonia	+2:22	25:03.4	17	27:25.4	+2:27.9
12	22	Fabio Obermeyr	Austria	+3:17	24:10.5	3	27:27.5	+2:30.0
13	3	Espen Bjørnstad	Norway	+1:19	26:12.7	31	27:31.7	+2:34.2
14	15	Johannes Rydzek	Germany	+2:39	24:54.8	12	27:33.8	+2:36.3
15	20	Aaron Kostner	Italy	+3:08	24:27.6	7	27:35.6	+2:38.1
16	24	Stefan Rettenegger	Austria	+3:22	24:39.8	8	28:01.8	+3:04.3
17	16	Franz-Josef Rehrl	Austria	+2:44	25:37.5	=24	28:22.5	+3:24.0
18	19	Laurent Mühlethaler	France	+3:04	25:22.2	21	28:26.2	+3:28.7
19	13	Marco Heinis	France	+2:35	26:03.1	28	28:38.1	+3:40.6
20	31	Raffaele Buzzi	Italy	+3:40	25:06.2	18	28:46.2	+3:48.7
21	28	Akito Watabe	Japan	+3:33	25:14.2	19	28:47.2	+3:49.7
22	30	Jan Vytrval	Czech Republic	+3:39	25:22.1	20	29:01.1	+4:03.6
23	29	Ben Loomis	United States	+3:37	25:37.5	=24	29:14.5	+4:17.0
24	32	Otto Niittykoski	Finland	+3:43	25:35.8	23	29:18.8	+4:21.3
25	17	Sora Yachi	Japan	+2:46	26:39.9	35	29:25.9	+4:28.4
26	33	Wille Karhumaa	Finland	+4:09	25:26.5	22	29:35.5	+4:38.0
27	18	Vid Vrhovnik	Slovenia	+3:00	26:38.7	34	29:38.7	+4:41.2
28	14	Pascal Müller	Switzerland	+2:36	27:05.5	41	29:41.5	+4:44.0
29	37	Gaël Blondeau	France	+4:54	24:58.3	14	29:52.3	+4:54.8
30	21	Oleksandr Shumbarets	Ukraine	+3:11	26:49.2	37	30:00.2	+5:02.7
31	23	Shogo Azegami	Japan	+3:19	26:49.1	36	30:08.1	+5:10.6
32	25	Jiří Konvalinka	Czech Republic	+3:26	26:55.3	39	30:21.3	+5:23.8
33	39	Stephen Schumann	United States	+5:41	24:51.0	10	30:32.0	+5:34.5
34	42	Eero Hirvonen	Finland	+6:40	24:25.3	6	31:05.3	+6:07.8
35	34	Niklas Malacinski	United States	+4:38	26:28.3	32	32:06.3	+6:08.8
36	35	Iacopo Bortolas	Italy	+4:44	26:30.6	33	31:14.6	+6:17.1
37	38	Dmytro Mazurchuk	Ukraine	+5:18	26:04.9	29	31:22.9	+6:25.4
38	27	Zhao Jiawen	China	+3:28	28:05.1	46	31:33.1	+6:35.6
39	36	Gašper Brecl	Slovenia	+4:48	26:49.5	38	31:37.5	+6:40.0
40	41	Edgar Vallet	France	+6:18	26:07.9	30	32:25.9	+7:28.4
41	46	Alessandro Pittin	Italy	+7:47	25:02.8	15	32:49.8	+7:52.3
42	40	Ruslan Shumanskyi	Ukraine	+5:48	27:57.2	45	33:45.2	+8:47.7
43	44	Erik Lynch	United States	+7:07	27:03.9	40	34:10.9	+9:13.4
44	43	Paweł Szyndlar	Poland	+6:42	27:48.3	44	34:30.3	+9:32.8
45	47	Oleksandr Shovkoplias	Ukraine	+7:55	27:31.0	42	35:26.0	+10:28.5
46	45	Andrzej Waliczek	Poland	+7:24	29:08.1	47	36:32.1	+11:34.6
47	48	Chingiz Rakparov	Kazakhstan	+9:47	27:35.4	43	37:22.4	+12:24.9
48	49	Ali Askar	Kazakhstan	+9:50	31:24.4	48	41:14.4	+16:16.9
	26	Hektor Kapustík	Slovakia	+3:26	Did not start			
