= FIS Nordic World Ski Championships 2025 – Team large hill/4 × 5 km =

Team large hill/4 × 5 km at the FIS Nordic World Ski Championships 2025
- Venue: Granåsen Ski Centre
- Location: Trondheim, Norway
- Dates: 7 March
- Competitors: 36 from 9 nations
- Teams: 9
- Winning time: 50:37.7

Medalists
gold medal	Johannes Rydzek; Wendelin Thannheimer; Julian Schmid; Vinzenz Geiger	Germany
silver medal	Johannes Lamparter; Franz-Josef Rehrl; Martin Fritz; Fabio Obermeyr	Austria
bronze medal	Simen Tiller; Jørgen Graabak; Jens Lurås Oftebro; Jarl Magnus Riiber	Norway

The Team large hill/4 × 5 km competition at the FIS Nordic World Ski Championships 2025 was held on 7 March 2025.

== Results ==
=== Ski jumping ===
The ski jumping was started at 12:00.

Rank	Bib	Country	Distance (m)	Points	Time difference
1	7	Austria; Fabio Obermeyr; Franz-Josef Rehrl; Martin Fritz; Johannes Lamparter	125.0; 139.5; 130.0; 130.0	508.9; 119.1; 137.7; 123.9; 128.2	0:00
2	9	Germany; Johannes Rydzek; Wendelin Thannheimer; Vinzenz Geiger; Julian Schmid	131.0; 129.0; 130.5; 131.5	506.7; 127.9; 125.9; 125.4; 127.5	+0:02
3	4	Japan; Akito Watabe; Sora Yachi; Yoshito Watabe; Ryōta Yamamoto	130.0; 134.5; 127.5; 125.0	480.8; 125.6; 123.7; 116.7; 114.8	+0:28
4	6	Finland; Otto Niittykoski; Wille Karhumaa; Eero Hirvonen; Ilkka Herola	125.0; 117.5; 111.0; 120.5	422.7; 117.4; 102.0; 95.7; 107.6	+1:26
5	8	Norway; Simen Tiller; Jørgen Graabak; Jens Lurås Oftebro; Jarl Magnus Riiber	136.0; DSQ; 132.5; 134.5	406.6; 138.2; 0.0; 130.3; 138.1	+1:42
6	5	France; Marco Heinis; Edgar Vallet; Gaël Blondeau; Laurent Mühlethaler	127.0; 104.0; 107.0; 116.5	372.1; 118.1; 77.3; 79.5; 97.2	+2:17
7	3	United States; Erik Lynch; Stephen Schumann; Niklas Malacinski; Ben Loomis	113.0; 104.0; 112.5; 110.5	347.0; 89.5; 69.3; 100.6; 87.6	+2:42
8	2	Italy; Manuel Senoner; Aaron Kostner; Raffaele Buzzi; Alessandro Pittin	113.0; 120.0; 120.5; 97.5	346.1; 87.4; 102.9; 98.7; 57.1	+2:43
9	1	Ukraine; Dmytro Mazurchuk; Oleksandr Shumbarets; Oleksandr Shovkoplias; Ruslan Shumanskyi	102.5; 116.0; 97.0; 89.0	264.4; 73.5; 98.9; 49.6; 42.4	+4:05

=== Cross-country skiing ===
The cross-country skiing part was started at 15:40.

Rank	Bib	Country	Deficit	Time	Rank	Finish time	Deficit
1st place, gold medalist(s)	2	Germany; Johannes Rydzek; Wendelin Thannheimer; Vinzenz Geiger; Julian Schmid	0:02	50:35.7; 12:38.1; 12:43.4; 12:37.6; 12:36.6	2	50:37.7	
2nd place, silver medalist(s)	1	Austria; Fabio Obermeyr; Franz-Josef Rehrl; Martin Fritz; Johannes Lamparter	0:00	50:44.5; 12:27.2; 12:43.0; 12:57.5; 12:36.8	3	50:44.5	+6.8
3rd place, bronze medalist(s)	5	Norway; Simen Tiller; Jørgen Graabak; Jens Lurås Oftebro; Jarl Magnus Riiber	1:42	50:35.5; 12:55.5; 12:32.0; 12:08.9; 12:59.1	1	50:35.5	+1:39.8
4	4	Finland; Otto Niittykoski; Wille Karhumaa; Eero Hirvonen; Ilkka Herola	1:26	51:20.4; 12:53.8; 12:25.0; 12:19.1; 13:42.5	4	51:20.4	+2:08.7
5	3	Japan; Akito Watabe; Sora Yachi; Yoshito Watabe; Ryōta Yamamoto	0:28	53:25.6; 13:30.8; 12:48.3; 13:24.4; 13:42.1	7	53:25.6	+3:15.9
6	8	Italy; Manuel Senoner; Aaron Kostner; Raffaele Buzzi; Alessandro Pittin	2:43	51:33.8; 12:12.7; 13:26.5; 12:44.2; 13:10.4	5	51:33.8	+3:39.1
7	6	France; Marco Heinis; Edgar Vallet; Gaël Blondeau; Laurent Mühlethaler	2:17	52:06.1; 12:38.3; 12:38.7; 13:10.0; 13:39.1	6	52:06.1	+3:45.4
8	7	United States; Erik Lynch; Stephen Schumann; Niklas Malacinski; Ben Loomis	2:42	54:53.3; 12:48.7; 13:53.5; 14:12.6; 13:58.5	8	54:53.3	+6:57.6
9	9	Ukraine; Dmytro Mazurchuk; Oleksandr Shumbarets; Oleksandr Shovkoplias; Ruslan Shumanskyi	4:05	56:55.4; 13:28.3; 13:59.5; 14:06.2; 15:21.4	9	56:55.4	+10:22.7
