= Franz-Josef Rehrl =

Austrian Nordic combined skier

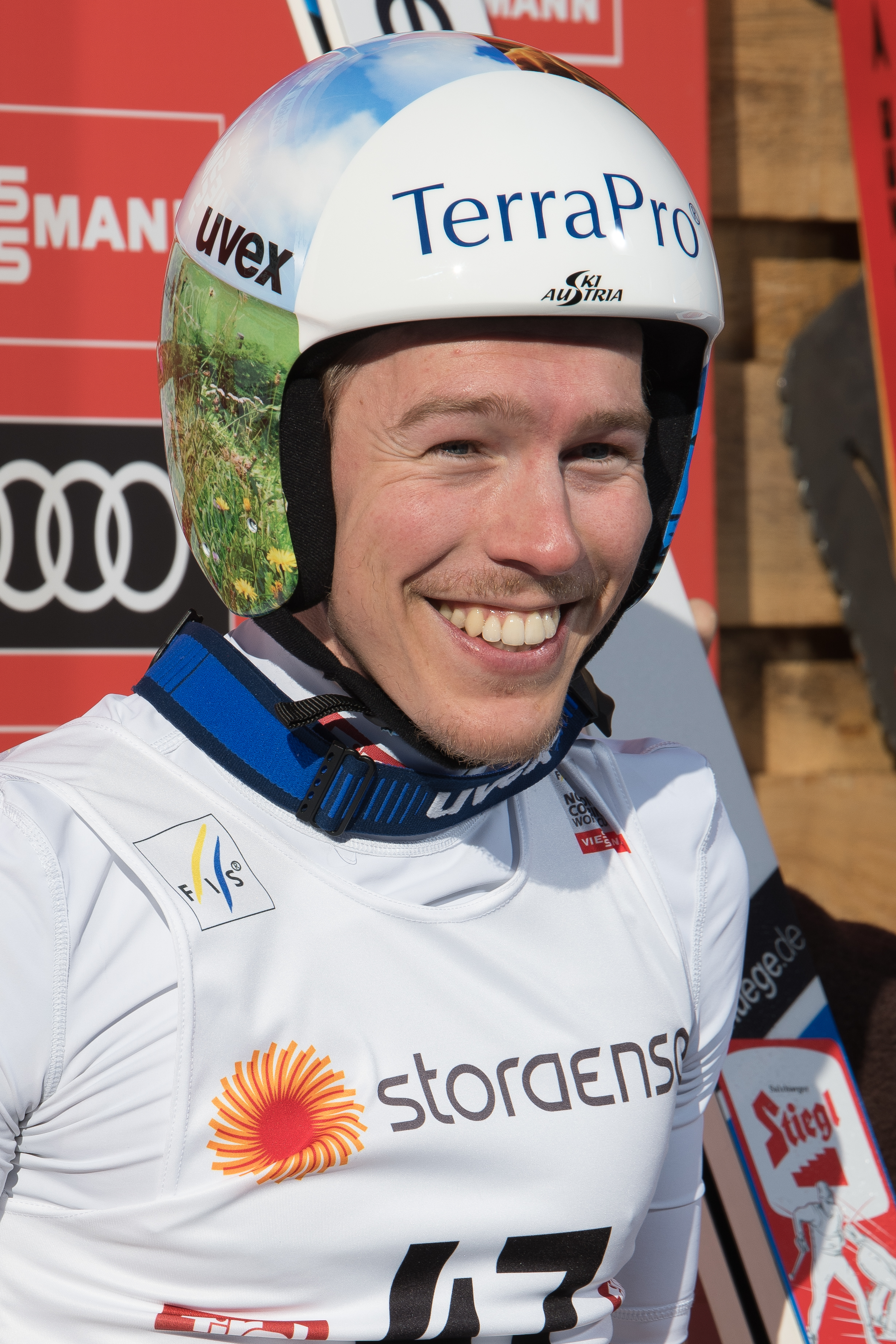
- Rehrl in 2018

Personal information
- Nationality: Austria
- Born: 15 March 1993 (age 33) Schladming, Austria
- Height: 1.75 m (5 ft 9 in)

Sport
- Sport: Skiing
- Club: WSV Ramsau-Steiermark

World Cup career
- Indiv. starts: 150
- Indiv. podiums: 12
- Indiv. wins: 2
Medal record
Men's Nordic combined
Representing Austria
World Championships
Silver medal – second place	2025 Trondheim	Team LH
Bronze medal – third place	2019 Seefeld	Individual LH
Bronze medal – third place	2019 Seefeld	Team sprint
Disqualified	2019 Seefeld	Team NH
Bronze medal – third place	2023 Planica	Individual NH
- Updated on 11 February 2024

Franz-Josef Rehrl (born 15 March 1993) is an Austrian Nordic combined skier who competes internationally.

He competed at the 2018 and 2022 Winter Olympics.

His first podium in an World Cup race came on 30 November 2018, when he finished third at Lillehammer. His first win came in the same season, in Chaux-Neuve.

== Record ==
=== Olympic Games ===
Year	Individual NH	Individual LH	Team LH
2018	13	—	—
2022	9	11	4

=== World Championship ===
Year	Individual NH	Individual LH	Team NH	Team sprint/ Mass start
2019	4	Bronze	DSQ	Bronze
2023	Bronze	–	–	–
2025	14	17	Silver	–

== World Cup wins ==
Season	Date	Location	Discipline
2018–19	18 January 2019	(France) Chaux-Neuve	HS118/5 km
2018–19	19 January 2019	(France) Chaux-Neuve	HS118/10 km
