= Nordic combined at the 2023 Winter World University Games – Men's individual normal hill/10 km =

Men's individual normal hill/10 km at the Lake Placid 2023 FISU World University Games
- Nordic combined
- Venue: Lake Placid Olympic Ski Jumping Complex (ski jumping); Lake Placid Olympic Sports Complex Cross Country Biathlon Center (cross-country skiing)
- Date: 13 February
- Competitors: 19 from 7 nations
- Winning time: 24:52.2

Medalists
1st place, gold medalist(s)		Sakutaro Kobayashi	Japan
2nd place, silver medalist(s)		Niklas Malacinski	United States
3rd place, bronze medalist(s)		Rasmus Ähtävä	Finland

The men's individual normal hill/10 km competition in Nordic combined at the 2023 Winter World University Games was held on 13 January, at the Lake Placid Olympic Ski Jumping Complex and Lake Placid Olympic Sports Complex Cross Country Biathlon Center.

== Results ==
=== Ski jumping ===
The ski jumping part will be held at 14:15.

Rank	Bib	Name	Country	Distance (m)	Points	Time difference
1	13	Sakutaro Kobayashi	Japan	100.0	138.6	
2	14	Evan Nichols	United States	88.5	107.3	+2:05
3	6	Matěj Fadrhons	Czech Republic	88.0	106.3	+2:09
4	17	Rasmus Ähtävä	Finland	92.0	104.5	+2:16
5	16	Vitalii Hrebeniuk	Ukraine	88.5	103.2	+2:22
6	18	Dmytro Mazurchuk	Ukraine	89.5	102.0	+2:26
7	19	Niklas Malacinski	United States	82.0	100.8	+2:31
8	10	Andrzej Szczechowicz	Poland	85.0	97.7	+2:44
9	2	Motoki Yamanaka	Japan	86.5	95.1	+2:54
10	5	Takuya Nakazawa	Japan	82.0	90.7	+3:12
11	1	Kazuho Kodate	Japan	82.0	90.5	+3:12
12	3	Paweł Szyndlar	Poland	77.0	83.1	+3:42
13	7	Magzhan Amankeldiuly	Kazakhstan	79.0	81.5	+3:48
14	4	Henry Johnstone	United States	68.0	66.6	+4:48
15	8	Adam Skupień	Poland	69.0	63.9	+4:59
16	9	Oleksandr Shumbarets	Ukraine	70.0	62.4	+5:05
17	11	Ali Askar	Kazakhstan	70.0	59.4	+5:17
18	15	Aidan Ripp	United States	60.5	44.1	+6:18
19	12	Timothy Ziegler	United States	57.0	35.2	+6:54

=== Cross-country ===
The cross-country part will be held at 19:00.

Rank	Bib	Name	Country	Start time	Cross-country		Finish time	Deficit
Rank	Bib	Name	Country	Start time	Time	Rank	Finish time	Deficit
1st place, gold medalist(s)	1	Sakutaro Kobayashi	Japan	0:00	24:52.2	9	24:52.3	
2nd place, silver medalist(s)	7	Niklas Malacinski	United States	2:31	23:57.6	1	26:28.6	+1:36.4
3rd place, bronze medalist(s)	4	Rasmus Ähtävä	Finland	2:16	24:19.2	4	26:35.2	+1:43.0
4	2	Evan Nichols	United States	2:05	24:31.5	5	26:36.5	+1:44.3
5	6	Dmytro Mazurchuk	Ukraine	2:26	24:15.5	3	26:41.5	+1:49.3
6	5	Vitalii Hrebeniuk	Ukraine	2:22	24:33.5	6	26:55.5	+2:03.3
7	3	Matěj Fadrhons	Czech Republic	2:09	24:53.4	10	27:02.4	+2:10.2
8	8	Andrzej Szczechowicz	Poland	2:44	24:44.4	8	27:28.4	+2:36.2
9	10	Takuya Nakazawa	Japan	3:12	24:39.3	7	27:51.3	+2:59.1
10	11	Kazuho Kodate	Japan	3:12	26:09.2	14	29:21.2	+4:29.0
11	12	Paweł Szyndlar	Poland	3:42	25:44.8	13	29:26.8	+4:34.6
12	14	Henry Johnstone	United States	4:48	25:19.6	11	30:07.6	+5:15.4
13	18	Aidan Ripp	United States	6:18	24:03.9	2	30:21.9	+5:29.7
14	16	Oleksandr Shumbarets	Ukraine	5:05	25:20.1	12	30:25.1	+5:32.9
15	13	Magzhan Amankeldiuly	Kazakhstan	3:48	27:36.9	18	31:24.9	+6:32.7
16	15	Adam Skupień	Poland	4:59	27:05.1	16	32:04.1	+7:11.9
17	17	Ali Askar	Kazakhstan	5:17	27:34.3	17	32:51.3	+7:59.1
18	19	Timothy Ziegler	United States	6:54	26:32.1	15	33:26.1	+8:33.9
	9	Motoki Yamanaka	Japan	2:54	DNS			
