= Stefan Rettenegger =

Austrian Nordic combined skier

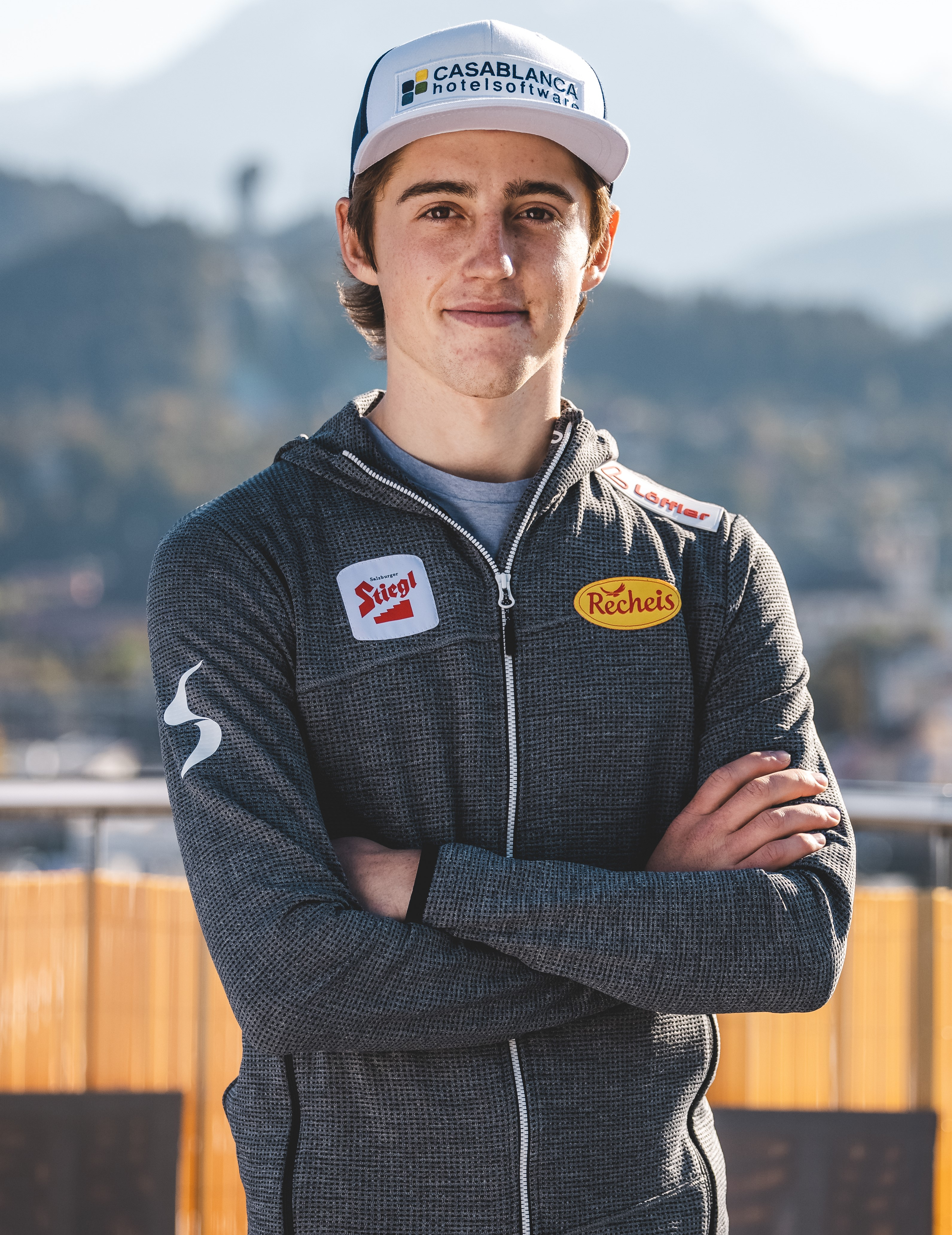
- Rettenegger in 2021

Personal information
- Nationality: Austria
- Born: 3 February 2002 (age 24) Schwarzach im Pongau, Austria
- Height: 1.72 m (5 ft 8 in)

Sport
- Sport: Skiing
- Club: TSU St. Veit

World Cup career
- Seasons: 5 – (2020–present)
- Indiv. starts: 58
- Indiv. podiums: 8
- Indiv. wins: 0
- Team podiums: 0
- Overall titles: 0 – (12th in 2023)
- Discipline titles: 0
Medal record
Representing Austria
Men's Nordic combined
Olympic Games
Bronze medal – third place	2026 Milano Cortina	Team LH
World Championships
Bronze medal – third place	2023 Planica	Team LH
Bronze medal – third place	2023 Planica	Mixed team
Bronze medal – third place	2025 Trondheim	Mixed team
Youth Olympic Games
Silver medal – second place	2020 Lausanne	Nordic combined
Men's ski jumping
Youth Olympic Games
Gold medal – first place	2020 Lausanne	Mixed team NH
- Updated on 19 February 2026

Stefan Rettenegger (born 3 February 2002) is an Austrian Nordic combined skier. At the 2026 Winter Olympics, he won a bronze medal in the team large hill.

== Career ==
He won bronze medals in the Team LH and mixed team events at the FIS Nordic World Ski Championships 2023.

== Personal life ==
His brother, Thomas is also a Nordic combined skier.

== Nordic combined results ==
=== Olympic Games ===
- 1 bronze medal

Year	Individual NH	Individual LH	Team LH
2026	4	11	Bronze

=== World Championships ===
- 3 bronze medals

Year	Individual NH	Individual LH	Team NH/LH	Mixed Team NH
2023	7	5	Bronze	Bronze
2025	14	16	—	Bronze
