= Oleksandr Shumbarets =

Ukrainian Nordic combined skier

- Shumbarets in 2020

Personal information
- Full name: Oleksandr Yuriyovych Shumbarets
- Born: 17 September 2001 (age 25) Ternopil Oblast, Ukraine
- Height: 178 cm (70 in)
- Weight: 64 kg (141 lb)

Sport
- Sport: Skiing

World Cup career
- Seasons: 2024—
- Updated on 15 October 2026

Oleksandr Shumbarets (Ukrainian: Олександр Юрійович Шумбарець; born September 17, 2001, in Ternopil Oblast, Ukraine) is a Ukrainian Nordic combined skier. He competed at the 2026 Winter Olympics.

== Career ==
Shumbarets began his sporting career in 2009. His coaches are Mykola Kozlov and Petro Heniuk.

He made his debut in the Continental Cup on February 10, 2018. As of October 2026, his best individual Continental Cup result is 10th place in 2026, and he finished 34th in the overall standings in the 2023–24 season. He made his Grand Prix debut on August 28, 2022, and, as of October 2026, his best finish is 30th in Chaux-Neuve in August 2024.

Shumbarets competed at three World Championships. Since then, he is a regular member of Ukrainian team.

At the 2023 Winter World University Games in Lake Placid, Shumbarets was 14th in the Gundersen event on January 13 and 15th in the mass start on January 15.

Shumbarets made his World Cup debut on January 13, 2024. As of October 2026, his best individual World Cup result is 35th place in the mass start in Ruka, Finland, on December 1, 2024.

In 2026, Shumbarets was part of the Ukrainian team at the 2026 Winter Olympics in Milan and Cortina d'Ampezzo. He finished 30th in the individual normal hill/10 km on February 11 and 31st in the individual large hill/10 km on February 17. He then finished 12th in the team event on February 19.

As ski jumper, Shumbarets competes in FIS Cup and FIS events only.

== Results ==
=== Olympic Games ===
| Year | Event | NH | LH | Team |
|---|---|---|---|---|
| 2026 | (Italy) Milano Cortina | 30 | 31 | 12 |

=== World Championships ===
| Year | Event | NH | LH | Team | Team sprint |
|---|---|---|---|---|---|
| 2021 | Oberstdorf, Germany | | 46 | 11 | |
| 2023 | Planica, Slovenia | 44 | 43 | 10 | |
| 2025 | Trondheim, Norway | 39 | 30 | 9 | |
