= Dmytro Mazurchuk =

Ukrainian Nordic combined skier

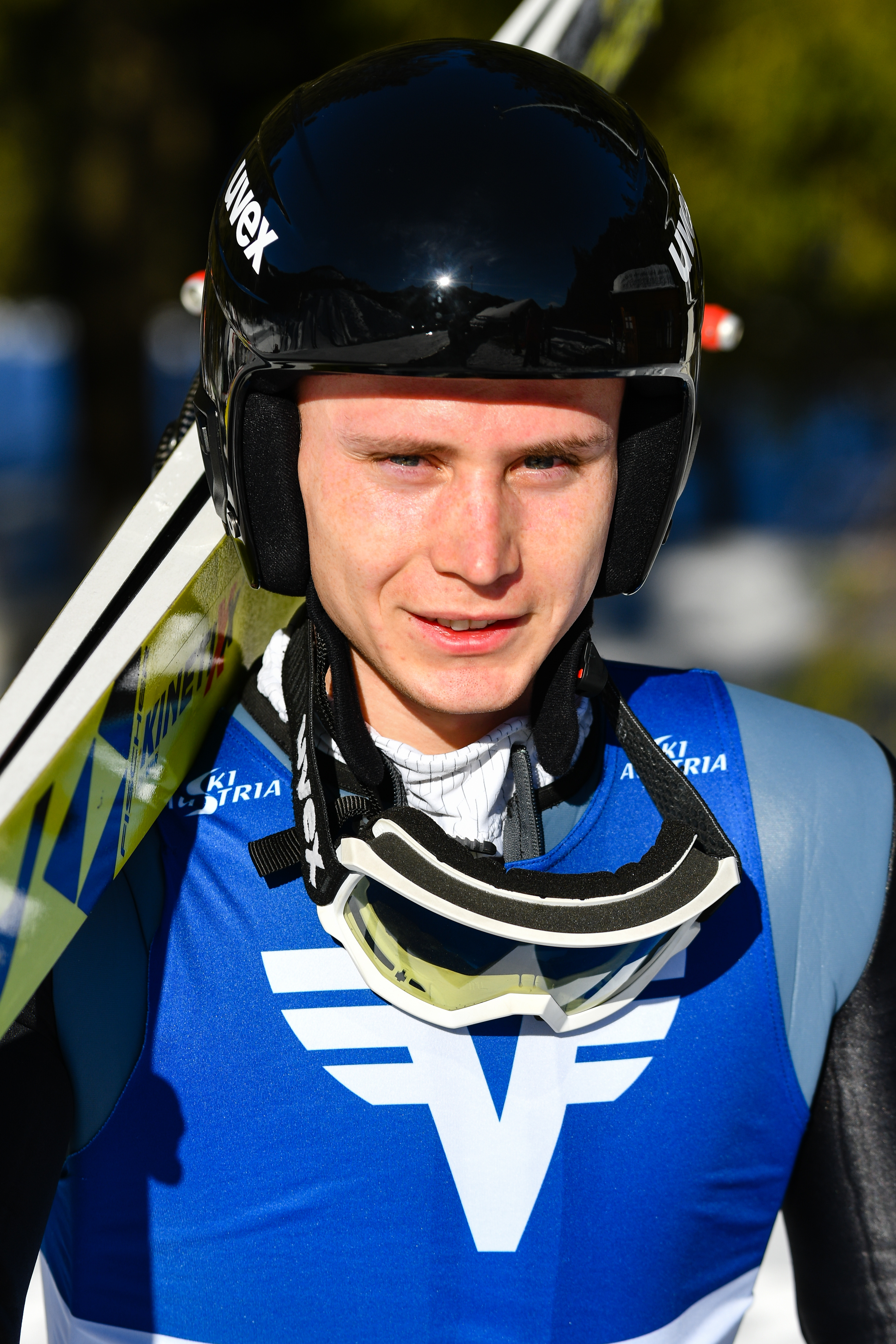
- Mazurchuk in 2020

Personal information
- Full name: Dmytro Valeriyovych Mazurchuk
- Born: 19 January 1999 (age 27) Kremenets, Ternopil Oblast, Ukraine

Sport
- Sport: Skiing
Medal record
Men's Nordic combined
Representing Ukraine
Winter Universiade
Bronze medal – third place	2023 Lake Placid	Men's team sprint
- Updated on 18 January 2023

Dmytro Mazurchuk (Ukrainian: Дмитро Валерійович Мазурчук; born January 19, 1999, in Kremenets, Ukraine) is a Ukrainian Nordic combined skier and former ski jumper. He competed at the 2022 Winter Olympics. He is bronze medallist of the 2023 Winter World University Games.

== Career ==
Mazurchuk started his international career at the 2015 European Youth Olympic Winter Festival in Tschagguns, Austria, where he finished 29th in the NH/10 km competition. At the beginning of his sporting career, Mazurchuk also competed in ski jumping, but only in FIS Cup competitions. He last started as a ski jumper in September 2018.

At the 2016 Winter Youth Olympics in Norwegian Lillehammer, he was 7th in the NH/5 km competition.

Mazurchuk participated at five Junior World Championships between 2015 and 2019. His best personal results were 14th in HN/5 km and NH/10 km competitions in Swiss Kandersteg in 2018. Afterwards, he participated at three World Championships.

Mazurchuk debuted at the World Cup on January 13, 2018, in Italian Val di Fiemme, where he was 16th in men's team sprint (together with Pasichnyk). His first individual World Cup race took place on November 30, 2018, in Norwegian Lillehammer, where he was 55th. As of January 2023, Mazurchuk's best individual World Cup result was 30th on January 9, 2022, in Val di Fiemme, Italy. His best personal Continental Cup result remains 8th rank from December 4, 2021, in Chinese Zhangjiakou.

In 2022, Mazurchuk was nominated for his first Winter Games in Beijing. He participated at both individual events. His best finish was 32nd in the large hill/10 km competition.

At the 2023 Winter World University Games, Mazurchuk finished 5th in the normal hill/10 km and 7th in the mass start 10 km/normal hill. On 17 January, he won a bronze medal in the team sprint with Vitalii Hrebeniuk, the first medal for Ukraine in this sport at the Winter Universiades. He represented Lviv State University of Physical Culture.

== Results ==
=== Olympic Games ===
Year	Event	NH	LH	Team
2022	Beijing, China	36	32	
2026	(Italy) Milano Cortina	27	30	12

=== World Championships ===
Year	Event	NH	LH	Team	Team sprint
2017	Lahti, Finland	52	51		14
2019	Seefeld, Austria	40	46		13
2021	Oberstdorf, Germany	41	37	11	12
2023	Planica, Slovenia	38	41	11	—
2025	Trondheim, Norway	37	37	9	—
