= Espen Andersen (skier, born 1993) =

Norwegian Nordic combined skier (born 1993)

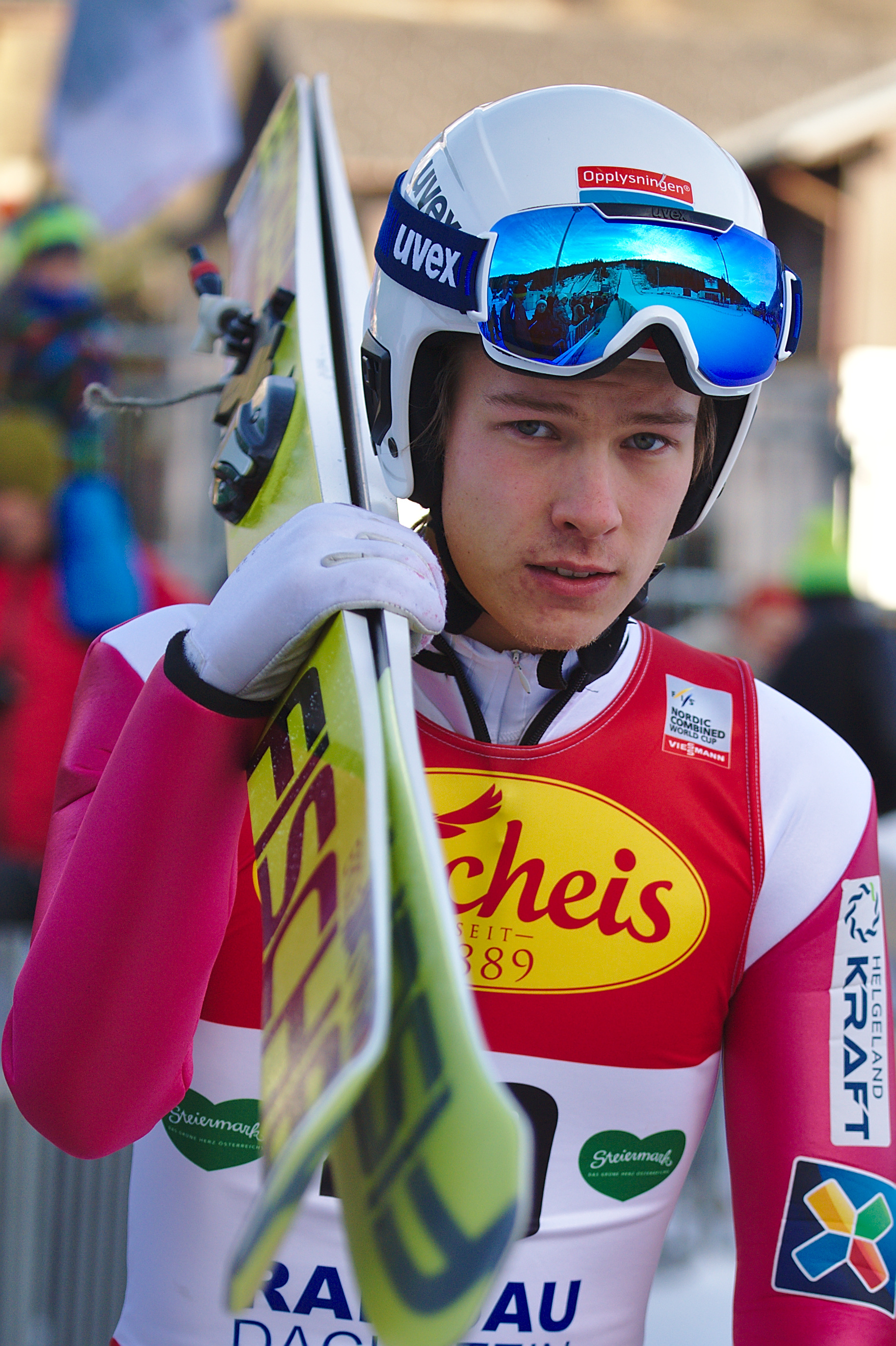
- Andersen in 2016

Personal information
- Nationality: Norway
- Born: 28 October 1993 (age 32) Bærums Verk, Norway
- Height: 1.80 m (5 ft 11 in)

Sport
- Sport: Skiing
- Club: Lommedalen IL

World Cup career
- Seasons: 2013–2026
- Indiv. starts: 190
- Indiv. podiums: 2
- Indiv. wins: 2
Medal record
Men's Nordic combined
Representing Norway
Olympic Games
Gold medal – first place	2022 Beijing	Team LH
Silver medal – second place	2018 Pyeongchang	Team LH
World Championships
Gold medal – first place	2023 Planica	Team LH
Silver medal – second place	2021 Oberstdorf	Team sprint

Espen Andersen (born 28 October 1993) is a former Norwegian Nordic combined skier.

== Career ==
At the 2012 Junior World Championships, he won a bronze medal in the 5 km Gundersen event and a fourth place in the team competition and fifth in the 10 km. At the 2013 Junior World Championships, he managed sixth place. At the 2013 Winter Universiade, he finished 20th in mass start, seventh in Gundersen, and fourth in the team competition.

He made his FIS Alpine Ski World Cup debut in March 2013 in Oslo, with a 47th place, and collected his first World Cup points with a 20th-place finish in March 2014—also in Oslo. He first made the top 15 with a 12th place in January 2015 in Sapporo.

He hails from Bærum, represents the sports club Lommedalens IL but relocated to Lillehammer to train.

== World Cup wins ==
Season	Date	Location	Hill
2017–18	24 November 2017	(Finland) Ruka	HS142
2017–18	3 December 2017	(Norway) Lillehammer	HS138
