= Mario Seidl =

Austrian Nordic combined skier (born 1992)

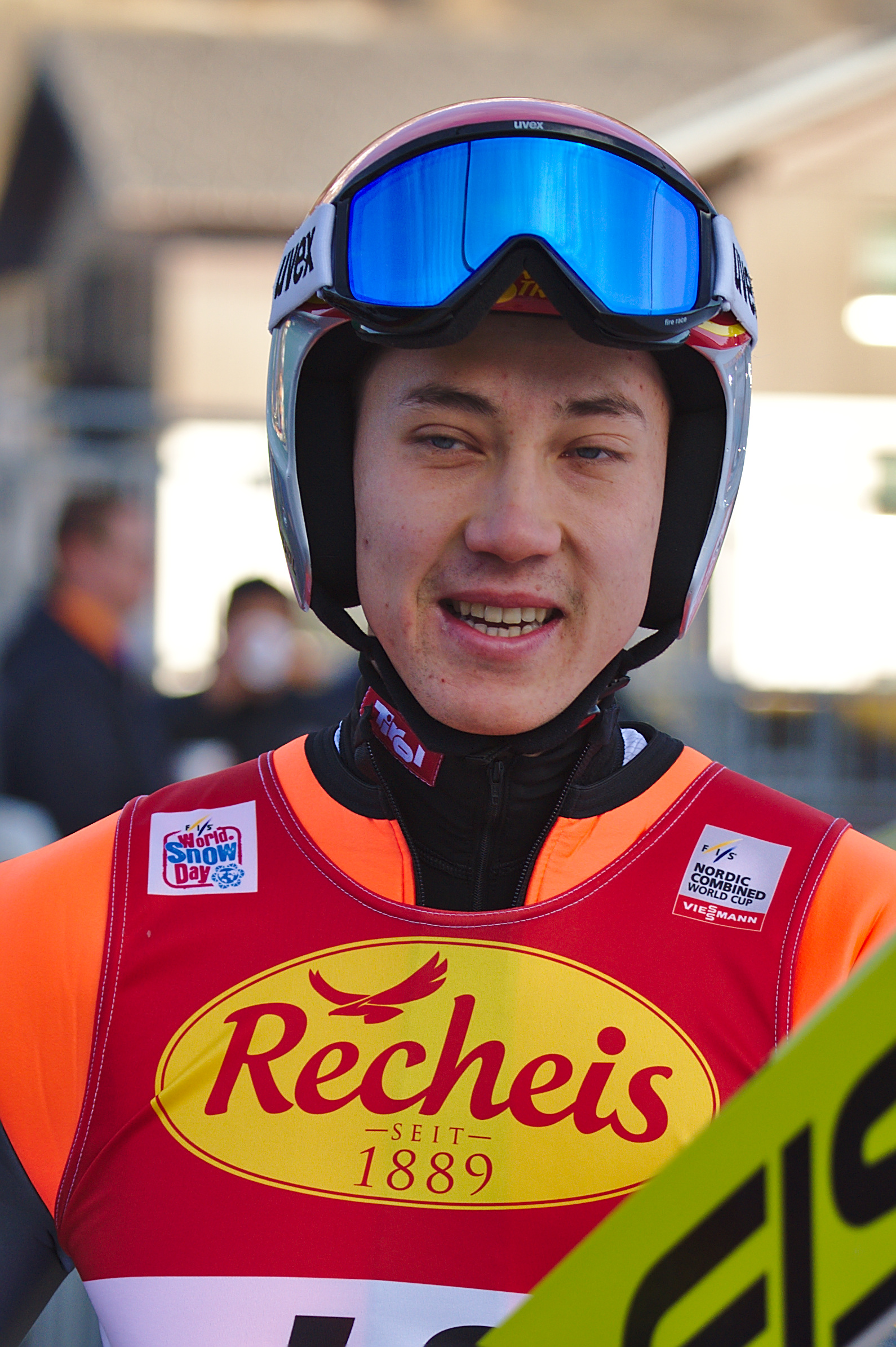
- Seidl in 2016

Personal information
- Nationality: Austria
- Born: 8 December 1992 (age 33) Schwarzach im Pongau, Austria
- Height: 1.78 m (5 ft 10 in)

Sport
- Sport: Skiing
- Club: TSU St. Veit i. P.-Salzburg

World Cup career
- Seasons: 2012–2026
- Indiv. starts: 175
- Indiv. podiums: 7
- Indiv. wins: 2
Medal record
Olympic Games
Bronze medal – third place	2018 Pyeongchang	Team LH
World Championships
Bronze medal – third place	2017 Lahti	Team NH
Bronze medal – third place	2021 Oberstdorf	Team NH
Disqualified	2019 Seefeld	Team NH

Mario Seidl (born 8 December 1992) is an Austrian former Nordic combined skier.

== Career ==
Seidl was born on 8 December 1992 in Schwarzach im Pongau, Salzburg, Austria.

He debuted in the World Cup in the 2011–12 season in Val di Fiemme, Italy on 3 February 2012, finishing 36th in the Large Hill. His first podium in the World Cup was in the 2016–17 World Cup which was held at PyeongChang, South Korea in February 2017, where he finished second. His first win came in Ruka, Finland, in November 2018.

In January 2019, he won the trophy in the Nordic Combined Triple.

Seidl competed in the 2018 Winter Olympics, where he placed thirteenth in the Nordic combined Individual large hill/10 km, and won bronze as part of the Austrian team in the Team large hill/4 × 5 km.

At the 2022 Winter Olympics, Seidl again placed thirteenth in the Individual large hill/10 km.

Following a lengthy process during which he was not suspended from competition, in May 2025 Seidl was retrospectively banned from November 2019 to November 2023 for an anti-doping rule violation due to abnormalities in his biological passport. His results for the periods October 2016 to February 2017 and February 2019 to April 2019 were disqualified.

== World Cup wins ==
Season	Date	Location	Hill
2018–19	24 November 2018	(Finland) Ruka	HS142 / 10 km
2018–19	20 January 2019	(France) Chaux-Neuve	HS118 / 15 km
