= Tomáš Portyk =

Czech Nordic combined skier

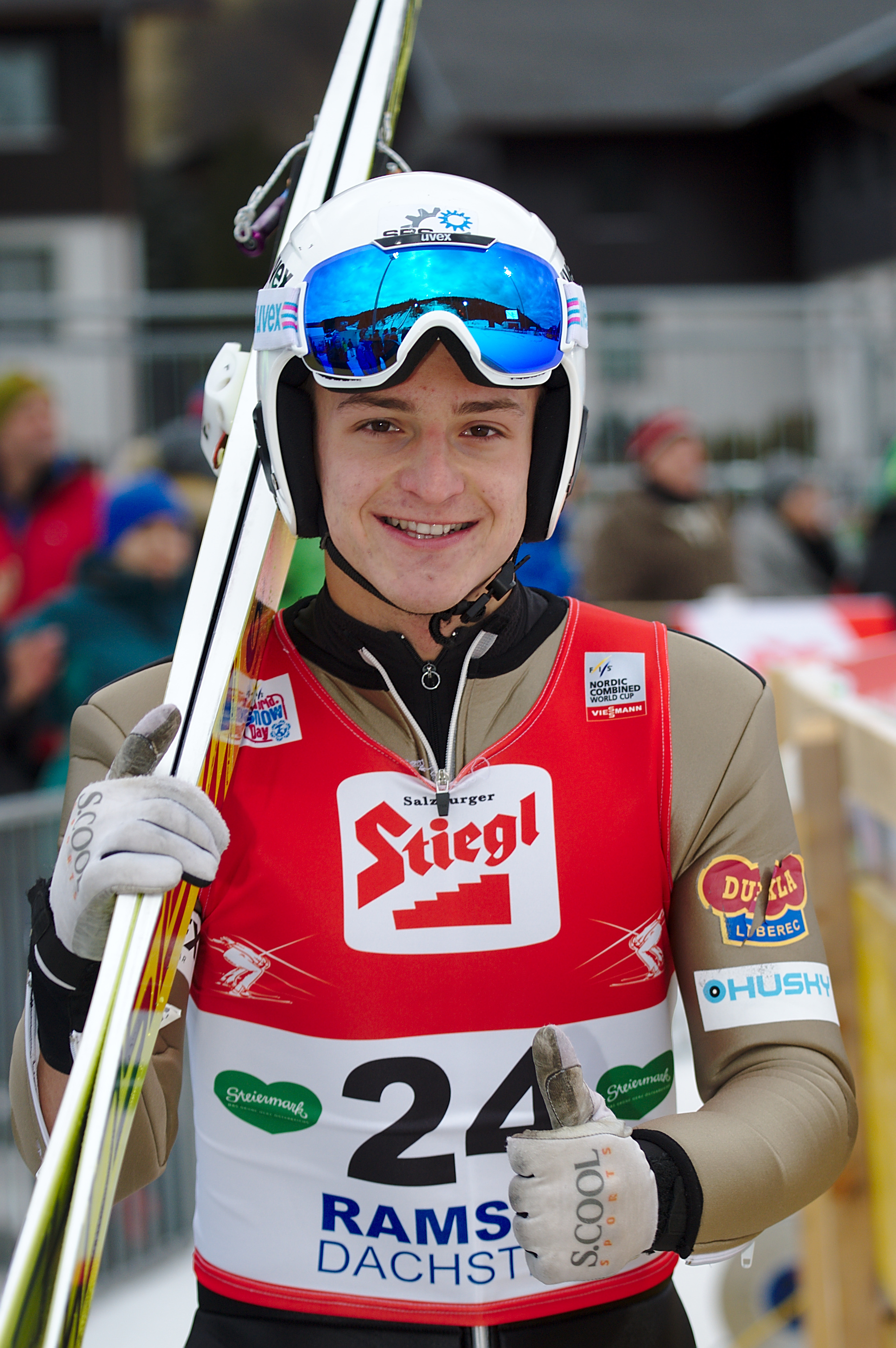
- Portyk in 2016

Personal information
- Nationality: Czech
- Born: 6 April 1996 (age 30) Jilemnice

Sport
- Sport: Skiing
- Club: LSK Lomnice nad Popelkou

World Cup career
- Seasons: 2013-2023
- Indiv. starts: 137
- Indiv. podiums: 1 (Team event)

Tomáš Portyk (born 6 April 1996) is a Czech former Nordic combined skier. He was born in Jilemnice. He competed at the FIS Nordic World Ski Championships 2013 in Val di Fiemme, and at the 2014 Winter Olympics in Sochi. He competed in the 2018 Winter Olympics and the 2022 Winter Olympics.

His best result in the World Cup is a second place in a Team sprint event in January 2017, at Val di Fiemme, alongside Miroslav Dvořák.
