= Ben Loomis =

American Nordic combined skier (born 1998)

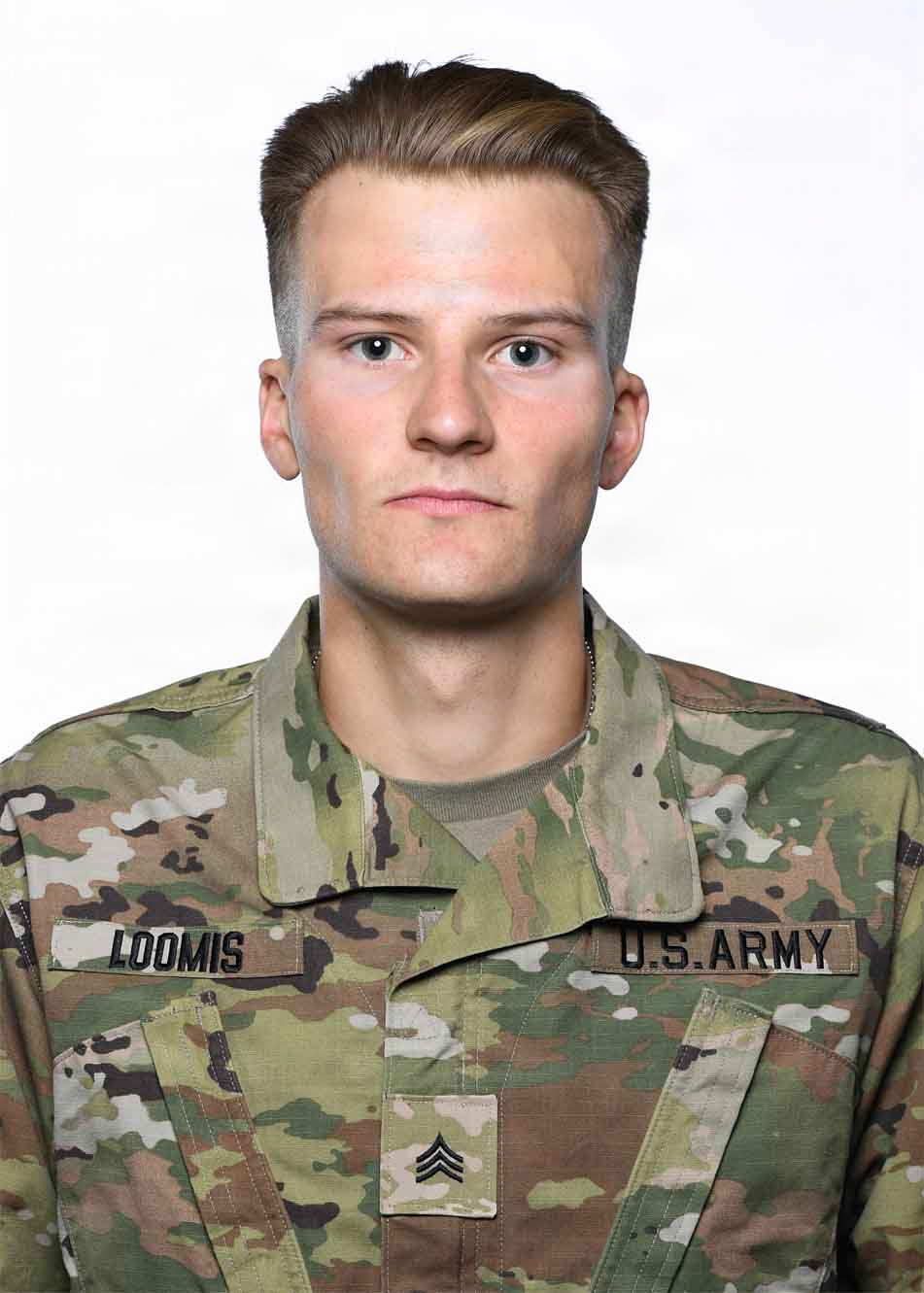
- Loomis c. 2026

Personal information
- Full name: Benjamin Loomis
- Born: June 9, 1998 (age 28) Eau Claire, Wisconsin, U.S.
- Height: 6 ft 1 in (185 cm)
- Weight: 160 lb (73 kg)

Sport
- Country: United States
- Sport: Nordic combined skiing
Medal record
Men's Nordic combined
Representing United States
Youth Olympic Games
| Silver medal – second place | 2016 Lillehammer | Nordic combined |

Ben Loomis (born June 9, 1998) is an American Nordic combined skier. He was selected to represent Team USA competed at the 2018 Winter Olympics, 2022 Winter Olympics, and 2026 Winter Olympics.

== Career ==
In 2016, Loomis won the Youth Cup in Trondheim, Norway. Loomis competed in the 2014, 2015, 2016, 2017, and 2018 International Ski Federation Junior World Championships and came in 7th place (team normal hill/4x5K) in 2015 and 2017 and 6th place in 2016. During the 2018 Junior World Championships, Loomis finished 3rd in the 10k individual Gunderson event and 4th in the 5k individual Gunderson event. Loomis also competed in the 2017, 2019, and 2021 World Championships. At the 2021 World Championships, Loomis posted a 31st-place finish in the 10k individual Gundersen event. During the 2021-2022 World Cup season, Loomis posted a 12th-place finish at the Val di Fiemme World Cup, a personal best World Cup result, and the top World Cup finish by a USA Nordic athlete since 2018. Currently, Loomis is ranked as the top American within the Nordic Combined World Cup Standings.

=== Olympic career ===
In 2016, Loomis won the silver medal in Nordic combined at the 2016 Winter Youth Olympics, which was the first U.S. medal in the sport at a Youth Games. Loomis was named the 2016 USSA Nordic Combined Athlete of the Year by the United States Ski and Snowboard Association.

==== Nordic Combined Youth Olympics ====
| Year | Athlete | Highlights |
|---|---|---|
| 2016 | Ben Loomis | 2nd Place - Historic Best US Result |

In 2018, Loomis was nominated for the 2018 Winter Olympics held in Pyeongchang, Korea, where he competed in all three events.

==== 2018 Winter Olympics Men's Gundersen LH HS140/10.0k ====
| Year | Athlete | Highlights |
|---|---|---|
| 2018 | Ben Loomis | 40th Place finish |

Loomis was selected to represent the United States at the upcoming 2022 Winter Olympics in Beijing, China.

=== World Championships ===
| Year | Competition | Event | Location | Rank |
|---|---|---|---|---|
| 2025 | FIS Nordic World Ski Championships | Individual normal hill/7.5 km compact | Trondheim, Norway | 21st |
| 2025 | FIS Nordic World Ski Championships | Individual large hill/10 km | Trondheim, Norway | 23th |
| 2025 | FIS Nordic World Ski Championships | Team large hill/4 × 5 km | Trondheim, Norway | 8th |

== Personal life ==
Ben Loomis grew up ski jumping at the Flying Eagles Ski Club in Eau Claire, Wisconsin. After watching his older brother Adam try the sport, he followed suit. He started at age five and began traveling around the midwest for competitions.

At the age of 15, Loomis moved to Park City, Utah, to ski and attend the Winter Sports School, from which he graduated.

In 2019, Loomis was selected into the U.S. Army World Class Athlete Program and is a Sergeant with the Utah National Guard.
