= Niklas Malacinski =

American Nordic combined skier (born 2003)

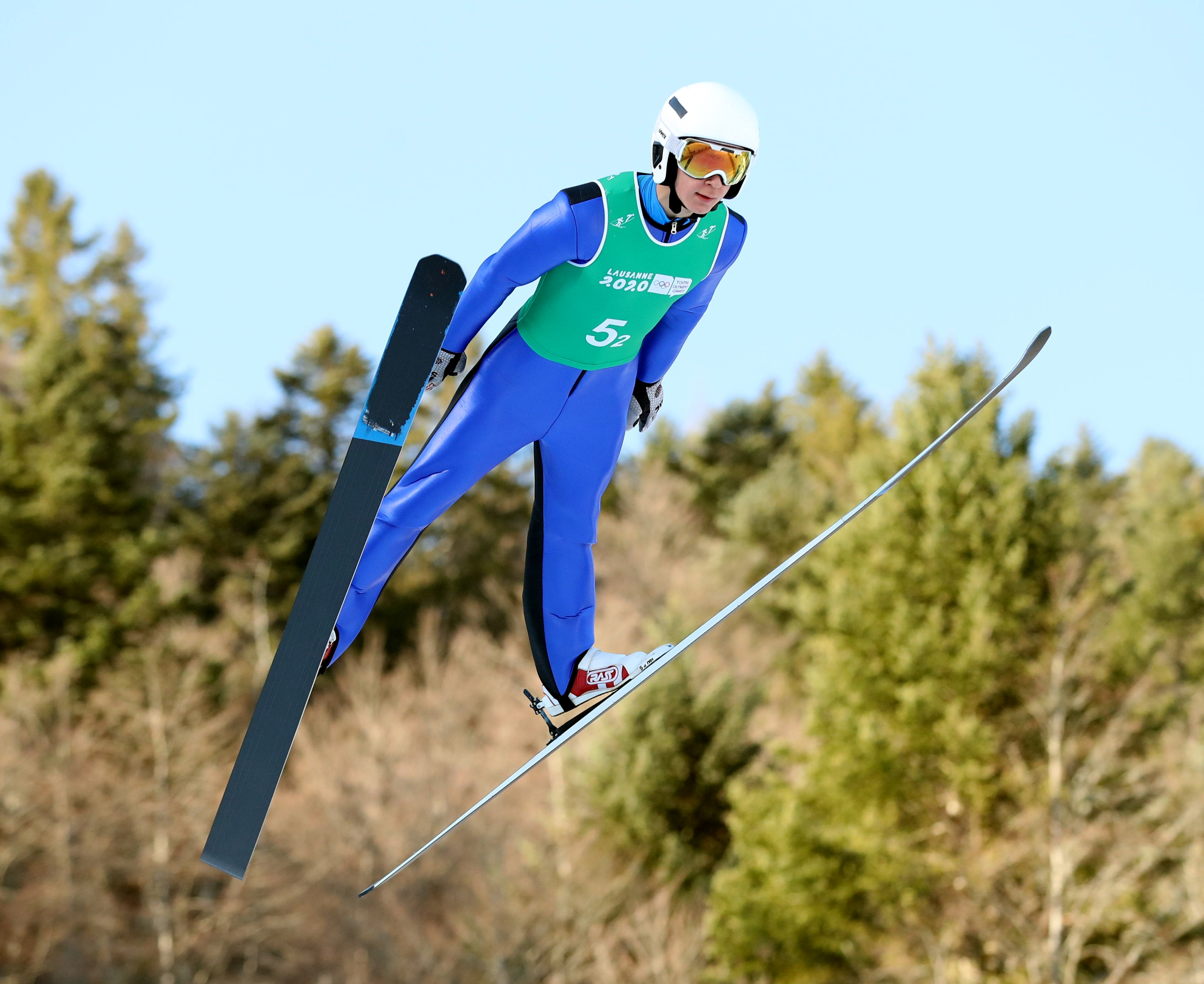
- Malacinski at the 2020 Winter Youth Olympics

Personal information
- Nationality: United States
- Born: December 7, 2003 (age 22) Steamboat Springs, Colorado, U.S.

Sport
- Sport: Skiing

World Cup career
- Seasons: 4 – (2022–present)
Medal record
Men's Nordic combined
Representing the United States
World University Games
| Gold medal – first place | 2023 Lake Placid | Team NH |
| Silver medal – second place | 2023 Lake Placid | Individual NH |
| Silver medal – second place | 2023 Lake Placid | Mass start |
- Updated on February 11, 2026

Niklas Malacinski (born December 7, 2003) is an American Nordic combined skier. He represented the United States at the 2026 Winter Olympics.

== Career ==
Malacinski represented the United States at the 2020 Winter Youth Olympics with his best finish being fifth place in the individual normal hill.

He competed at the 2023 Winter World University Games and won a gold medal in the team sprint normal hill. This was the first gold medal for team USA at the 2023 Winter World University Games. He also won a silver medal in the mass start and the individual normal hlll events.

In January 2026, he was selected to represent the United States at the 2026 Winter Olympics.

== Personal life ==
His older sister, Annika, is also a Nordic combined skier.
