= Ryōta Yamamoto =

Japanese Nordic combined skier (born 1997)

Ryota Yamamoto
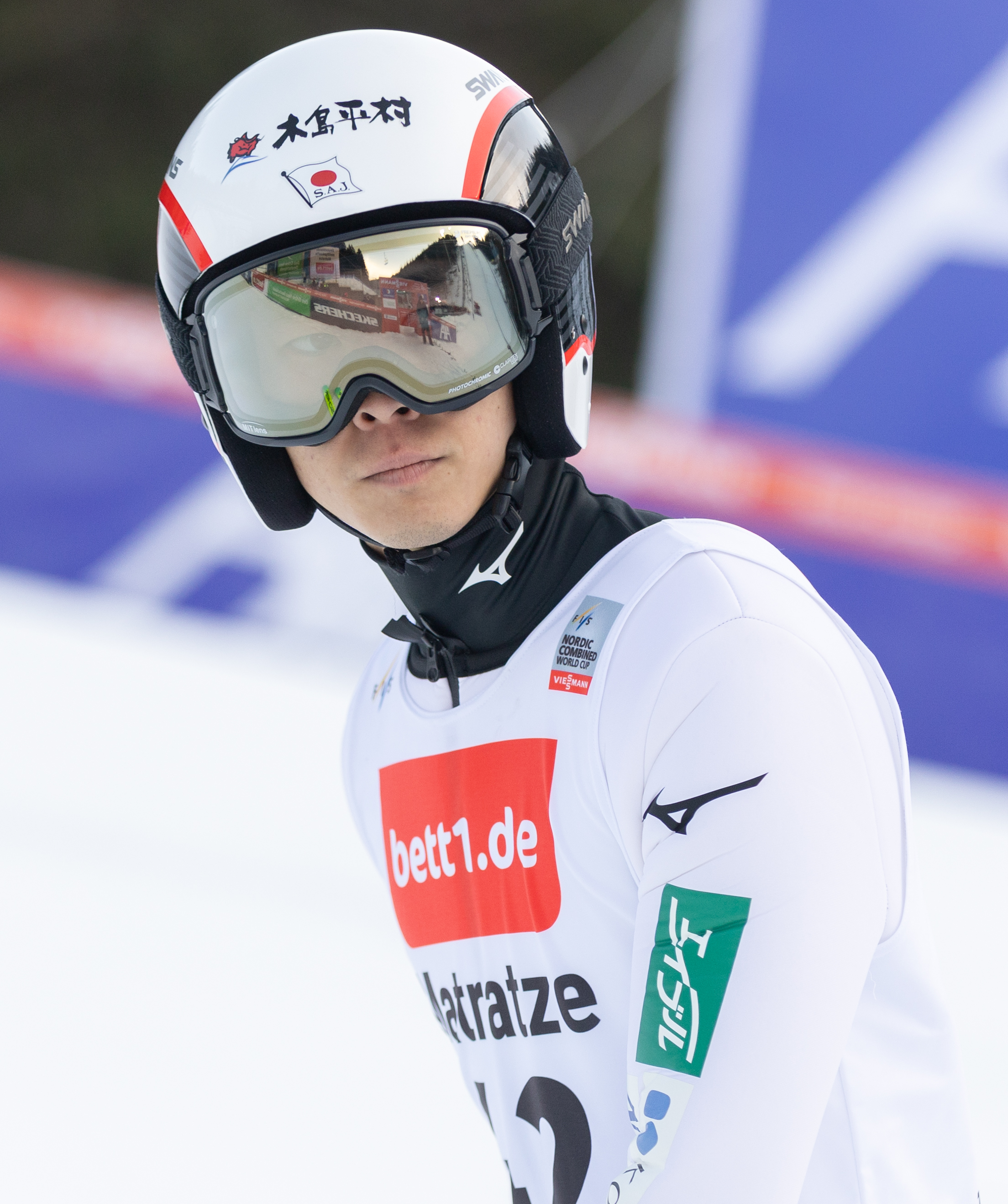

Personal information
- Nationality: Japan
- Born: 13 May 1997 (age 29) Kijimadaira, Japan
- Height: 1.67 m (5 ft 6 in)

Sport
- Sport: Skiing
- Club: Nagano Hino Motors Ski Team

World Cup career
- Seasons: 2019-
- Indiv. starts: 89
- Indiv. podiums: 4
- Team podiums: 1
- Overall titles: 0 (best place 12th in 2023)
- Discipline titles: 1 (2023Best jumper trophy)
Medal record
Men's Nordic combined
Representing Japan
Olympic Games
Bronze medal – third place	2022 Beijing	Team LH

Ryota Yamamoto (born 13 May 1997) is a Japanese Nordic combined skier who competed at the 2022 and 2026 Winter Olympics.
