= Laurent Muhlethaler =

French Nordic combined skier (born 1997)

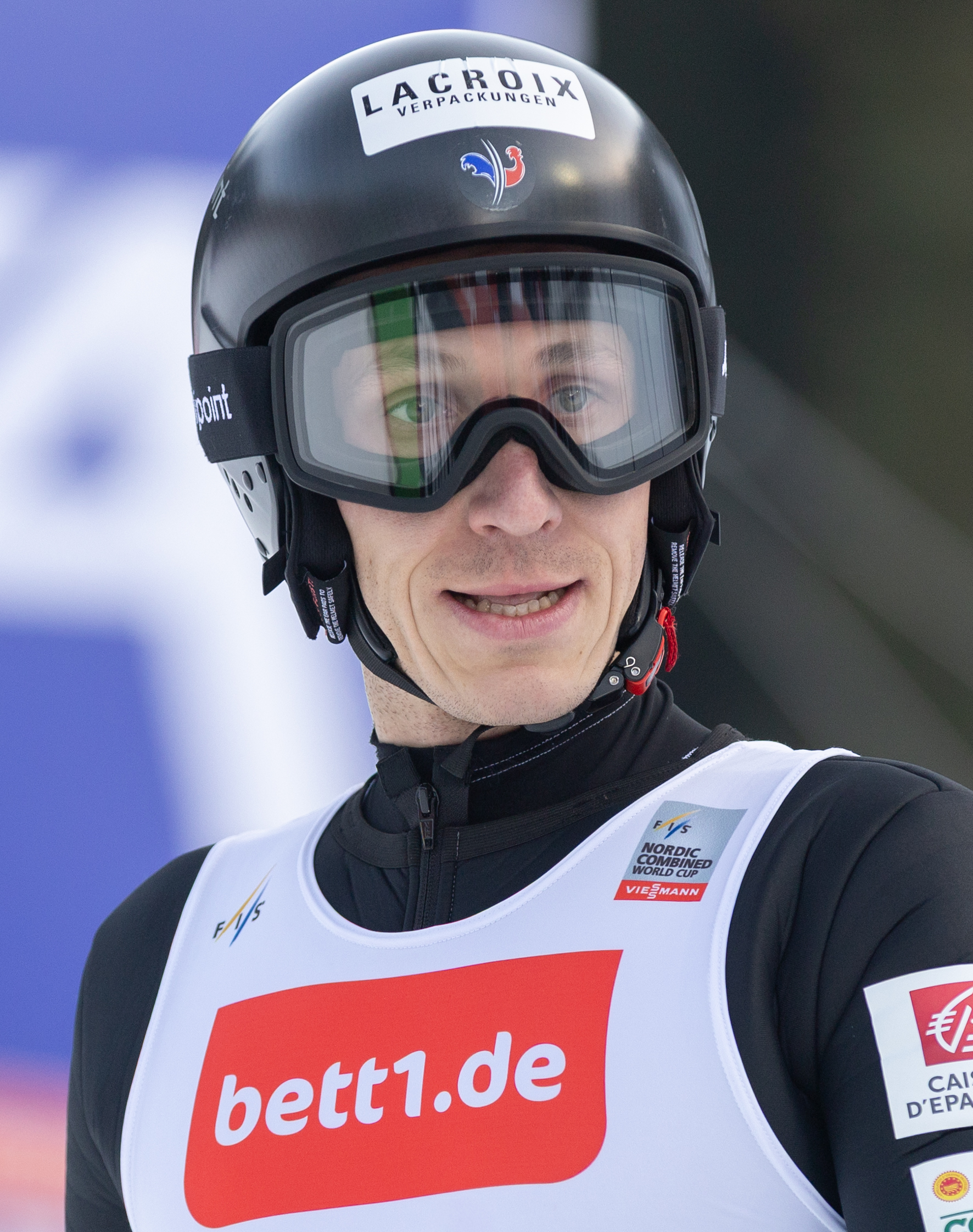
- Muhlethaler in 2026

Personal information
- Nationality: France
- Born: 27 September 1997 (age 28) Prémanon, France

Sport
- Sport: Skiing
- Club: Prémanon SC

World Cup career
- Seasons: 8 – (2017–present)
- Indiv. starts: 121
- Indiv. podiums: 1
- Indiv. wins: 0
- Team podiums: 0
- Overall titles: 0 – (8th in 2023)
- Discipline titles: 0
Medal record
Men's Nordic combined
Representing France
Junior World Championships
Silver medal – second place	2017 Park City	Team NH
Bronze medal – third place	2017 Park City	Individual sprint
- Updated on 4 February 2024

Laurent Muhlethaler (born 27 September 1997) is a French Nordic combined skier. He competed in the individual normal hill, individual large hill and team large hill events at the 2022 Winter Olympics.
