= Granåsen Ski Centre =

Winter sport venue located in Trondheim, Norway

Coordinates: 63°22′39″N 10°18′33″E

- Granåsen skisenter
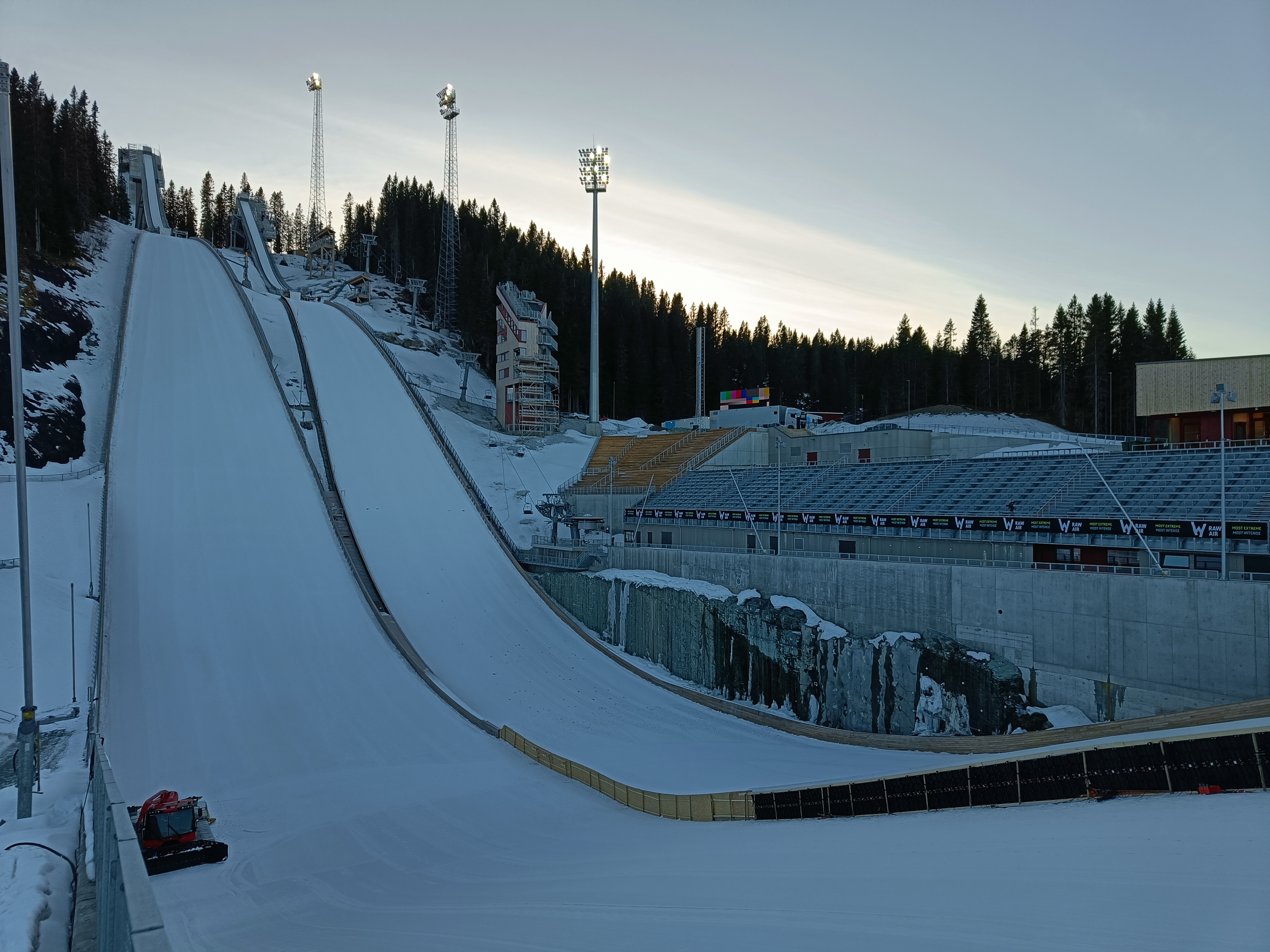
- The Granåsen Ski Jump at Granåsen Ski Centre in 2024.
- Interactive map of Granåsen Ski Centre
- Address: Smistadvegen 11-13, 7026 Trondheim
- Location: Trondheim, Norway
- Owner: Municipality of Trondheim
- Capacity: 5,000 permanent (Cross-country); 18,000 (Ski jumping)
- Type: Stadium
- Event: Sporting events
- Surface: Snow
- Scoreboard: No
- Record attendance: 100,000 est. (FIS Nordic World Ski Championships 2025 - Men's 50km)
- Field size: 8.3km (Cross-country); K-124 (Large hill); K-90 (Normal hill)
- Field shape: Path (Cross-country); Bowl (Ski jumping)
- Public transit: Granåsen Idrettspark, AtB lines 23, 50, 52, 53, 101

Construction
- Built: 1938–1940
- Opened: 4 February 1940
- Renovated: 1952, 1960, 1990
- Expanded: 2023

Granåsen Ski Centre (in Norwegian: Granåsen skisenter) is a winter sport venue located in Trondheim, Norway. Granåsen Ski Centre frequently hosts competitions arranged by FIS; Ski jumping World Cup and Continental Cup, Nordic combined World Cup and has hosted events in the Cross-Country World Cup on five occasions and Biathlon World Cup on one occasion. The 1997 and 2025 FIS Nordic Nordic World Ski Championships took place at Granåsen.

== Biathlon ==
A shooting range for biathlon was built in 2008 and 2009 and was used during Biathlon World Cup competitions in March 2009.

== Cross-country skiing ==
Granåsen Ski Centre has hosted events in the Cross-Country World Cup on five occasions; 1989–90, 1995–96, 1996–97, 1999–2000 and latest in the 2008–09 season. In 2020, the two last stages of the FIS Ski Tour 2020 were held at Granåsen.

== Ski jumping ==
The ski jumping hill sports one K-90 hill and one K-124 hill.

Before the 2008–2009 season the large hill was improved, and the K-spot is now located at 124 meters while the hill size has been increased to 140 meters. The hill record belongs to Kamil Stoch, who jumped 146 m in March 2018 during the World Cup competition.

== Summertime use ==
The centre includes a 2.5 kilometres (1.6 mi) roller ski course. Some of the ski jumping hills are also used during summer.

The Cross-Country and Biathlon arenas hosts outdoor concerts during the summer. Major artists that have performed there includes Bruce Springsteen, Robbie Williams and Metallica.

== Notable events ==
Date	Category	Event	Winner	Second	Third	Sport	M/W
6 March 1990	World Cup	15 km classic	Alexey Prokurorov (RUS)	Gunde Svan (SWE)	Christer Majbäck (SWE)	Cross-country skiing	M
24 February 1996	World Cup	30 km freestyle	Vladimir Smirnov (KAZ)	Bjørn Dæhlie (NOR)	Alexey Prokurorov (RUS)	Cross-country skiing	M
24 February 1996	World Cup	5 km classic	Manuela Di Centa (ITA)	Marit Mikkelsplass (NOR)	Larisa Lazutina (RUS)	Cross-country skiing	W
24 February 1996	World Cup	10 km freestyle pursuit	Manuela Di Centa (ITA)	Stefania Belmondo (ITA)	Nina Gavrilyuk (RUS)	Cross-country skiing	W
25 February 1996	World Cup	4 ×10 km relay	Norway	Italy	Sweden	Cross-country skiing	M
21 February 1997	World Championships	30 km freestyle	Alexey Prokurorov (RUS)	Bjørn Dæhlie (NOR)	Thomas Alsgaard (NOR)	Cross-country skiing	M
21 February 1997	World Championships	15 km freestyle	Yelena Vyalbe (RUS)	Stefania Belmondo (ITA)	Kateřina Neumannová (CZE)	Cross-country skiing	W
22 February 1997	World Championships	15 km Gundersen	Kenji Ogiwara (JPN)	Bjarte Engen Vik (NOR)	Fabrice Guy (FRA)	Nordic combined	M
22 February 1997	World Championships	Normal hill	Janne Ahonen (FIN)	Masahiko Harada (JPN)	Andreas Goldberger (AUT)	Ski jumping	M
23 February 1997	World Championships	50 km classic	Yelena Vyalbe (RUS)	Stefania Belmondo (ITA)	Olga Danilova (RUS)	Cross-country skiing	W
23 February 1997	World Championships	4 × 5 km team	Norway	Finland	Austria	Nordic combined	M
24 February 1997	World Championships	10 km classic	Bjørn Dæhlie (NOR)	Alexey Prokurorov (RUS)	Mika Myllylä (FIN)	Cross-country skiing	M
24 February 1997	World Championships	5 km + 10 km combined pursuit	Yelena Vyalbe (RUS)	Stefania Belmondo (ITA)	Nina Gavrilyuk (RUS)	Cross-country skiing	W
25 February 1997	World Championships	10 km + 15 km combined pursuit	Bjørn Dæhlie (NOR)	Mika Myllylä (FIN)	Alexey Prokurorov (RUS)	Cross-country skiing	M
27 February 1997	World Championships	Team large hill	Finland	Japan	Germany	Ski jumping	M
28 February 1997	World Championships	4 × 10 km relay	Norway	Finland	Italy	Cross-country skiing	M
28 February 1997	World Championships	4 × 5 km relay	Russia	Norway	Finland	Cross-country skiing	W
1 March 1997	World Championships	30 km classic	Yelena Vyalbe (RUS)	Stefania Belmondo (ITA)	Marit Mikkelsplass (NOR)	Cross-country skiing	W
1 March 1997	World Championships	Large hill	Masahiko Harada (JPN)	Dieter Thoma (GER)	Sylvain Freiholz (SUI)	Ski jumping	M
2 March 1997	World Championships	50 km classic	Mika Myllylä (FIN)	Erling Jevne (NOR)	Bjørn Dæhlie (NOR)	Cross-country skiing	M
2 February 2000	World Cup	5 km freestyle	Stefania Belmondo (ITA)	Nina Gavrilyuk (RUS)	Yuliya Chepalova (RUS)	Cross-country skiing	W
8 December 2007	World Cup	Large hill	Thomas Morgenstern (AUT)	Gregor Schlierenzauer (AUT)	Tom Hilde (NOR)	Ski jumping	M
9 December 2007	World Cup	Large hill	Thomas Morgenstern (AUT)	Andreas Kofler (AUT)	Wolfgang Loitzl (AUT)	Ski jumping	M
6 December 2008	World Cup	Large hill	Gregor Schlierenzauer (AUT)	Ville Larinto (FIN)	Anders Jacobsen (NOR)	Ski jumping	M
7 December 2008	World Cup	Large hill	Simon Ammann (SUI)	Matti Hautamäki (FIN)	Gregor Schlierenzauer (AUT)	Ski jumping	M
12 March 2009	World Cup	Sprint classic	Ola Vigen Hattestad (NOR)	Petter Northug (NOR)	John Kristian Dahl (NOR)	Cross-country skiing	M
12 March 2009	World Cup	Sprint classic	Petra Majdič (SLO)	Alena Procházková (SVK)	Justyna Kowalczyk (POL)	Cross-country skiing	W
14 March 2009	World Cup	50 km classic	Sami Jauhojärvi (FIN)	Tobias Angerer (GER)	Alex Harvey (CAN)	Cross-country skiing	M
14 March 2009	World Cup	30 km classic	Petra Majdič (SLO)	Justyna Kowalczyk (POL)	Masako Ishida (JPN)	Cross-country skiing	W
19 March 2009	World Cup	10 km Sprint	Michael Greis (GER)	Ole Einar Bjørndalen (NOR)	Simon Eder (AUT)	Biathlon	M
19 March 2009	World Cup	7.5 km Sprint	Olga Zaitseva (RUS)	Helena Jonsson (SWE)	Sylvie Becaert (FRA)	Biathlon	W
21 March 2009	World Cup	12.5 km Pursuit	Ole Einar Bjørndalen (NOR)	Simon Eder (AUT)	Tomasz Sikora (POL)	Biathlon	M
21 March 2009	World Cup	10 km Pursuit	Andrea Henkel (GER)	Olga Zaitseva (RUS)	Marie-Laure Brunet (FRA)	Biathlon	W
22 March 2009	World Cup	15 km Mass start	Ole Einar Bjørndalen (NOR)	Simon Eder (AUT)	Emil Hegle Svendsen (NOR)	Biathlon	M
22 March 2009	World Cup	12.5 km Mass start	Tora Berger (NOR)	Simone Hauswald (GER)	Sandrine Bailly (FRA)	Biathlon	W
8 March 2012	World Cup	Large hill	Daiki Ito (JPN)	Richard Freitag (GER)	Simon Ammann (SUI)	Ski jumping	M
14 March 2013	World Cup	Normal hill	Sarah Hendrickson (USA)	Sara Takanashi (JPN)	Jacqueline Seifriedsberger (AUT)	Ski jumping	W
15 March 2013	World Cup	Large hill	Kamil Stoch (POL)	Daiki Ito (JPN)	Severin Freund (GER)	Ski jumping	M
7 March 2014	World Cup	Large hill	Anders Bardal (NOR)	Andreas Kofler (AUT)	Noriaki Kasai (JPN)	Ski jumping	M
12 March 2015	World Cup	Large hill	Severin Freund (GER)	Peter Prevc (SLO)	Rune Velta (NOR)	Ski jumping	M
10 February 2016	World Cup	Large hill	Peter Prevc (SLO)	Stefan Kraft (AUT)	Noriaki Kasai (JPN)	Ski jumping	M
15 March 2017	World Cup/Raw Air	Large hill (prologue)	Kamil Stoch (POL)	Andreas Stjernen (NOR)	Andreas Wellinger (GER)	Ski jumping	M
16 March 2017	World Cup/Raw Air	Large hill	Stefan Kraft (AUT)	Andreas Stjernen (NOR)	Andreas Wellinger (GER)	Ski jumping	M
14 March 2018	World Cup/Raw Air	Large hill (prologue)	Kamil Stoch (POL)	Andreas Stjernen (NOR)	Stefan Kraft (AUT)	Ski jumping	M
15 March 2018	World Cup/Raw Air	Large hill	Kamil Stoch (POL)	Stefan Kraft (AUT)	Robert Johansson (NOR)	Ski jumping	M
26 January 2019	World Cup	Large hill/10 km	Jarl Magnus Riiber (NOR)	Magnus Krog (NOR)	Wilhelm Denifl (AUT)	Nordic combined	M
27 January 2019	World Cup	Large hill/10 km	Jarl Magnus Riiber (NOR)	Vinzenz Geiger (GER)	Jørgen Graabak (NOR)	Nordic combined	M
22 February 2020	World Cup/Ski Tour 2020	Sprint classic	Johannes Høsflot Klæbo (NOR)	Pål Golberg (NOR)	Erik Valnes (NOR)	Cross-country skiing	M
22 February 2020	World Cup/Ski Tour 2020	Sprint classic	Maiken Caspersen Falla (NOR)	Jonna Sundling (SWE)	Nadine Fähndrich (SUI)	Cross-country skiing	W
22 February 2020	World Cup	Large hill/10 km	Jarl Magnus Riiber (NOR)	Jørgen Graabak (NOR)	Ilkka Herola (FIN)	Nordic combined	M
23 February 2020	World Cup	Large hill/10 km	Jarl Magnus Riiber (NOR)	Jens Lurås Oftebro (NOR)	Espen Bjørnstad (NOR)	Nordic combined	M
