= 2024 FIS Nordic Combined Grand Prix =

| Discipline | Men | Women |
| Overall | (France) Laurent Muhlethaler | (Germany) Jenny Nowak |
| Nations Cup | Germany | Germany |
| Best Jumper Trophy | (Switzerland) Pascal Müller | (Germany) Jenny Nowak |
| Best Skier Trophy | (France) Matteo Baud | (Germany) Nathalie Armbruster |

Competition
| Edition | 26th | 6th |
| Locations | 3 | 3 |
| Individual | 4 | 4 |
| Mixed | 1 | 1 |
| Cancelled | 1 | 0 |

The 2024 FIS Nordic Combined Grand Prix, organized by the International Ski Federation (FIS), is the 26th FIS Nordic Combined Grand Prix season for men, and 6th season for women as the most important series of Nordic combined competitions in the summer of 2024.

The season started on 23 August in Tschagguns, Austria and will conclude 1 September in Chaux-Neuve, France.

Johannes Rydzek from Germany (men's) and Ema Volavšek from Slovenia (women's) are the reigning champions from the previous season.

To be eligible for the overall win a competitor has to compete in all 4 individual events.

== Map of Grand Prix hosts ==
Europe

Location of all 3 Grand Prix hosts of the season

== Men ==
=== Calendar ===
G – Gundersen / C – Compact
| No. | Date | Place (Hill) | Discipline | Winner | Second | Third | R. |
|---|---|---|---|---|---|---|---|
| 1 | 25 August 2024 | (Austria) Tschagguns (Montafoner Schanzenzentrum HS103) | 10 km G | (Norway) Einar Lurås Oftebro | (Norway) Jens Lurås Oftebro | (Estonia) Kristjan Ilves | |
| 2 | 28 August 2024 | (Germany) Oberstdorf (Schattenbergschanze HS137) | 7,5 km C | (Germany) Johannes Rydzek | (Estonia) Kristjan Ilves | (Germany) David Mach | |
| 3 | 31 August 2024 | (France) Chaux-Neuve (La Côté Feuillée HS118) | 10 km G | (Germany) Johannes Rydzek | (Germany) Manuel Faißt | (France) Laurent Muhlethaler | |
| 4 | 1 September 2024 | (France) Chaux-Neuve (La Côté Feuillée HS118) | 10 km C | Cancelled | | | |

=== Standings ===
==== Overall ====
| Rank | after all 3 events | Points |
|---|---|---|
| | (France) Laurent Muhlethaler | 187 |
| 2 | (France) Matteo Baud | 103 |
| 3 | (Switzerland) Pascal Müller | 96 |
| 4 | (Austria) Manuel Einkemmer | 91 |
| 5 | (France) Edgar Vallet | 81 |
| 6 | (Slovenia) Vid Vrhovnik | 80 |
| 7 | (Italy) Raffaele Buzzi | 77 |
| 8 | (Italy) Aaron Kostner | 74 |
| 9 | (Austria) Florian Kolb | 72 |
| 10 | (France) Marco Heinis | 60 |

==== Best Jumper Trophy ====
| Rank | after all 3 events | Points |
|---|---|---|
| | (Switzerland) Pascal Müller | 274 |
| 2 | (Germany) David Mach | 250 |
| 3 | (France) Laurent Muhlethaler | 236 |
| 4 | (Germany) Johannes Rydzek | 204 |
| 5 | (Estonia) Kristjan Ilves (Austria) Thomas Rettenegger | 190 |
| 7 | (Germany) Terence Weber | 186 |
| 8 | (Ukraine) Oleksandr Shumbarets | 172 |
| 9 | (Germany) Manuel Faißt | 168 |
| 10 | (Austria) Lukas Greiderer | 152 |

==== Best Skier Trophy ====
| Rank | after all 3 events | Points |
|---|---|---|
| | (France) Matteo Baud | 162 |
| 2 | (France) Laurent Muhlethaler | 157 |
| 3 | (Germany) Johannes Rydzek | 155 |
| 4 | (Italy) Raffaele Buzzi | 146 |
| 5 | (Austria) Manuel Einkemmer | 138 |
| 6 | (Norway) Einar Lurås Oftebro | 136 |
| 7 | (Italy) Aaron Kostner | 136 |
| 8 | (Norway) Jens Lurås Oftebro | 133 |
| 9 | (France) Edgar Vallet | 125 |
| 10 | (Germany) Julian Schmid | 116 |

==== Nations Cup ====
| Rank | after all 4 events | Points |
|---|---|---|
| | Germany | 1176 |
| 2 | Austria | 710 |
| 3 | France | 598 |
| 4 | Norway | 548 |
| 5 | Slovenia | 336 |
| 6 | Italy | 328 |
| 7 | Estonia | 170 |
| 8 | United States | 160 |
| 9 | Switzerland | 96 |
| 10 | Finland | 71 |

== Women ==
=== Calendar ===
G – Gundersen / C – Compact
| No. | Date | Place (Hill) | Discipline | Winner | Second | Third | R. |
|---|---|---|---|---|---|---|---|
| 1 | 25 August 2024 | (Austria) Tschagguns (Montafoner Schanzenzentrum HS103) | 5 km G | (Germany) Jenny Nowak | (Norway) Ida Marie Hagen | (Slovenia) Ema Volavšek | |
| 2 | 28 August 2024 | (Germany) Oberstdorf (Schattenbergschanze HS137) | 5 km C | (Norway) Ida Marie Hagen | (Germany) Nathalie Armbruster | (Germany) Jenny Nowak | |
| 3 | 31 August 2024 | (France) Chaux-Neuve (La Côté Feuillée HS118) | 5 km G | (Germany) Jenny Nowak | (Slovenia) Ema Volavšek | (Finland) Minja Korhonen | |
| 4 | 1 September 2024 | (France) Chaux-Neuve (La Côté Feuillée HS118) | 5 km C | (Germany) Nathalie Armbruster | (Slovenia) Ema Volavšek | (Germany) Jenny Nowak | |

=== Standings ===
==== Overall ====
| Rank | after all 4 events | Points |
|---|---|---|
| | (Germany) Jenny Nowak | 360 |
| 2 | (Slovenia) Ema Volavšek | 330 |
| 3 | (Germany) Nathalie Armbruster | 320 |
| 4 | (France) Léna Brocard | 232 |
| 5 | (Slovenia) Teja Pavec | 172 |
| 6 | (Germany) Maria Gerboth | 157 |
| 7 | (Germany) Anne Häckel | 147 |
| 8 | (Poland) Joanna Kil | 146 |
| 9 | (Italy) Greta Pinzani | 132 |
| 10 | (Italy) Daniela Dejori | 128 |

==== Best Jumper Trophy ====
| Rank | after all 4 events | Points |
|---|---|---|
| | (Germany) Jenny Nowak | 322 |
| 2 | (Germany) Svenja Würth | 300 |
| 3 | (France) Léna Brocard | 231 |
| 4 | (Germany) Maria Gerboth | 227 |
| 5 | (Finland) Minja Korhonen | 225 |
| 6 | (Slovenia) Ema Volavšek | 214 |
| 7 | (Germany) Nathalie Armbruster | 205 |
| 8 | (Germany) Anne Häckel | 185 |
| 9 | (Norway) Ida Marie Hagen | 150 |
| 10 | (Slovenia) Teja Pavec | 150 |

==== Best Skier Trophy ====
| Rank | after all 4 events | Points |
|---|---|---|
| | (Germany) Nathalie Armbruster | 380 |
| 2 | (Slovenia) Ema Volavšek | 360 |
| 3 | (Germany) Jenny Nowak | 290 |
| 4 | (Poland) Joanna Kil | 208 |
| 5 | (Italy) Daniela Dejori | 200 |
| 6 | (France) Léna Brocard | 196 |
| 7 | (Slovenia) Teja Pavec | 179 |
| 8 | (Italy) Veronica Gianmoena | 168 |
| 9 | (Norway) Ida Marie Hagen | 145 |
| 10 | (Slovenia) Greta Pinzani | 140 |

==== Nations Cup ====
| Rank | after all 4 events | Points |
|---|---|---|
| | Germany | 1259 |
| 2 | Slovenia | 932 |
| 3 | Italy | 524 |
| 4 | France | 467 |
| 5 | Norway | 460 |
| 6 | Austria | 348 |
| 7 | Finland | 270 |
| 8 | United States | 169 |
| 9 | Poland | 146 |
| 10 | Slovakia | 19 |

== Mixed team ==
=== Calendar ===
| # | Date | Place (Hill) | Discipline | Winner | Second | Third | R. |
|---|---|---|---|---|---|---|---|
| 1 | 24 August 2024 | (Austria) Tschagguns (Montafoner Schanzenzentrum HS103) | 2 x 5 km + 2 x 2.5 km Relay | Slovenia I: 1. Vid Vrhovnik; 2. Tia Malovrh; 3. Ema Volavšek; 4. Gasper Brecl | Norway: 1. Jens Lurås Oftebro; 2. Ida Marie Hagen; 3. Marte Leinan Lund; 4. Einar Lurås Oftebro | Germany I: 1. Simon Mach; 2. Jenny Nowak; 3. Nathalie Armbruster; 4. Jakob Lange | |

== Provisional competition rounds ==
=== Men ===
| # | Place | Provisional round | Competition | Winner | R. |
|---|---|---|---|---|---|
| 1 | (Austria) Tschagguns | 23 August | 24–25 August | (Austria) Thomas Rettenegger | |
| 2 | (Germany) Oberstdorf | 27 August | 28 August | (Germany) Simon Mach | |
| 3 | (France) Chaux-Neuve | 30 August | 31 August–1 September | (Germany) Johannes Rydzek | |

=== Women ===
| # | Place | Provisional round | Competition | Winner | R. |
|---|---|---|---|---|---|
| 1 | (Austria) Tschagguns | 23 August | 24–25 August | (Germany) Jenny Nowak | |
| 2 | (Germany) Oberstdorf | 27 August | 28 August | (Austria) Lisa Hirner | |
| 3 | (France) Chaux-Neuve | 30 August | 31 August–1 September | (Germany) Svenja Würth | |

== Podium table by nation ==
Table showing the Grand Prix podium places (gold – 1st place, silver – 2nd place, bronze – 3rd place) by the countries represented by athletes.

| Rank | Nation | Gold | Silver | Bronze | Total |
|---|---|---|---|---|---|
| 1 | Germany | 5 | 2 | 4 | 11 |
| 2 | Norway | 2 | 3 | 0 | 5 |
| 3 | Slovenia | 1 | 2 | 1 | 4 |
| 4 | Estonia | 0 | 1 | 1 | 2 |
| 5 | Finland | 0 | 0 | 1 | 1 |
| 5 | France | 0 | 0 | 1 | 1 |
| Totals (6 entries) | | 8 | 8 | 8 | 24 |

== Points distribution ==
| Place | 1 | 2 | 3 | 4 | 5 | 6 | 7 | 8 | 9 | 10 | 11 | 12 | 13 | 14 | 15 | 16 | 17 | 18 | 19 | 20 | 21 | 22 | 23 | 24 | 25 | 26 | 27 | 28 | 29 | 30 | 31 | 32 | 33 | 34 | 35 | 36 | 37 | 38 | 39 | 40 |
| Individual | 100 | 90 | 80 | 70 | 60 | 55 | 52 | 49 | 46 | 43 | 40 | 38 | 36 | 34 | 32 | 30 | 28 | 26 | 24 | 22 | 20 | 19 | 18 | 17 | 16 | 15 | 14 | 13 | 12 | 11 | 10 | 9 | 8 | 7 | 6 | 5 | 4 | 3 | 2 | 1 |
| Mixed Team | 200 | 176 | 150 | 124 | 100 | 76 | 50 | 24 |
