= FIS Nordic World Ski Championships 2021 – Individual normal hill/10 km =

Individual normal hill/10 km at the FIS Nordic World Ski Championships 2021
- Location: Oberstdorf, Germany
- Dates: 26 February
- Competitors: 56 from 17 nations
- Winning time: 23:01.2

Medalists
gold medal	Jarl Magnus Riiber	Norway
silver medal	Ilkka Herola	Finland
bronze medal	Jens Lurås Oftebro	Norway

The Individual normal hill/10 km competition at the FIS Nordic World Ski Championships 2021 was held on 26 February 2021.

== Results ==
=== Ski jumping ===
The ski jumping part was held at 10:15.

Rank	Bib	Name	Country	Distance (m)	Points	Time difference
1	44	Ryōta Yamamoto	Japan	106.0	143.1	
2	54	Akito Watabe	Japan	104.0	138.1	+0:20
3	56	Jarl Magnus Riiber	Norway	103.0	137.6	+0:22
4	50	Johannes Lamparter	Austria	102.5	137.4	+0:23
5	43	Kristjan Ilves	Estonia	101.5	134.4	+0:35
6	48	Lukas Greiderer	Austria	101.0	133.8	+0:37
7	40	Yoshito Watabe	Japan	101.5	133.6	+0:38
8	52	Eric Frenzel	Germany	101.0	133.1	+0:40
9	53	Fabian Rießle	Germany	102.0	132.8	+0:41
9	27	Ondřej Pažout	Czech Republic	103.0	132.8	+0:41
11	49	Jens Lurås Oftebro	Norway	100.5	131.6	+0:46
12	37	Laurent Mühlethaler	France	100.0	129.5	+0:54
13	51	Ilkka Herola	Finland	99.5	127.8	+1:01
14	45	Espen Bjørnstad	Norway	99.0	126.6	+1:06
15	46	Johannes Rydzek	Germany	99.0	125.9	+1:09
16	55	Vinzenz Geiger	Germany	98.0	125.8	+1:09
17	42	Lukas Klapfer	Austria	98.0	125.2	+1:12
18	31	Aaron Kostner	Italy	99.0	124.7	+1:14
19	34	Hideaki Nagai	Japan	99.0	124.4	+1:15
20	41	Martin Fritz	Austria	96.5	122.9	+1:21
21	47	Jørgen Graabak	Norway	97.0	121.0	+1:28
22	26	Matteo Baud	France	98.5	119.8	+1:33
23	36	Samuel Costa	Italy	97.0	119.3	+1:35
24	39	Espen Andersen	Norway	96.0	119.0	+1:36
25	25	Szczepan Kupczak	Poland	98.5	118.8	+1:37
26	28	Perttu Reponen	Finland	97.0	118.7	+1:38
27	35	Antoine Gérard	France	95.5	115.0	+1:52
28	24	Vid Vrhovnik	Slovenia	96.5	114.3	+1:55
29	14	Gašper Brecl	Slovenia	93.5	113.6	+1:58
30	33	Tomáš Portyk	Czech Republic	94.5	113.4	+1:59
31	9	Ben Loomis	United States	92.5	112.1	+2:04
32	29	Jan Vytrval	Czech Republic	94.0	111.7	+2:06
33	38	Alessandro Pittin	Italy	91.0	107.8	+2:21
34	5	Otto Niittykoski	Finland	90.0	107.5	+2:22
35	13	Andrzej Szczechowicz	Poland	88.5	105.9	+2:29
36	30	Raffaele Buzzi	Italy	88.5	98.7	+2:58
37	16	Jared Shumate	United States	85.5	97.0	+3:04
38	32	Taylor Fletcher	United States	86.5	94.3	+3:15
39	18	Dmytro Mazurchuk	Ukraine	82.5	90.4	+3:31
40	8	Viacheslav Barkov	Russian Ski Federation	81.5	88.5	+3:38
41	3	Park Je-un	South Korea	81.5	87.9	+3:41
42	7	Wille Karhumaa	Finland	81.0	87.0	+3:44
43	22	Aleksandr Milanin	Russian Ski Federation	83.0	84.9	+3:53
44	12	Jasper Good	United States	79.0	82.1	+4:04
45	11	Andreas Ilves	Estonia	75.0	72.5	+4:42
46	1	Artem Galunin	Russian Ski Federation	74.0	69.9	+4:53
47	23	Markuss Vinogradovs	Latvia	76.5	68.8	+4:57
48	21	Chingiz Rakparov	Kazakhstan	71.5	62.2	+5:24
49	20	Vitaliy Hrebeniuk	Ukraine	69.5	61.0	+5:28
50	19	Magzhan Amankeldiuly	Kazakhstan	68.5	57.9	+5:41
51	15	Viktor Pasichnyk	Ukraine	69.0	57.0	+5:44
52	2	Eldar Orussayev	Kazakhstan	62.0	45.3	+6:31
53	6	Vyacheslav Bochkarev	Kazakhstan	62.0	39.6	+6:54
	4	Andrii Pylypchuk	Ukraine	Disqualified		
	10	Gaël Blondeau	France	Disqualified		
	17	Samir Mastiev	Russian Ski Federation	Disqualified		

=== Cross-country skiing ===
The cross-country skiing part was held at 16:00.

Rank	Bib	Athlete	Country	Start time	Cross-country time	Cross-country rank	Finish time	Deficit
1st place, gold medalist(s)	3	Jarl Magnus Riiber	Norway	0:22	22:39.2	5	23:01.2	
2nd place, silver medalist(s)	13	Ilkka Herola	Finland	1:01	22:00.6	1	23:01.6	+0.4
3rd place, bronze medalist(s)	11	Jens Lurås Oftebro	Norway	0:46	22:16.1	2	23:02.1	+0.9
4	8	Eric Frenzel	Germany	0:40	22:27.1	3	23:07.1	+5.9
5	2	Akito Watabe	Japan	0:20	22:50.2	7	23:10.2	+9.0
6	9	Fabian Rießle	Germany	0:41	22:37.0	4	23:18.0	+16.8
7	4	Johannes Lamparter	Austria	0:23	23:06.8	10	23:29.8	+28.6
8	6	Lukas Greiderer	Austria	0:37	23:26.1	17	24:03.1	+1:01.9
9	21	Jørgen Graabak	Norway	1:28	22:47.0	6	24:15.0	+1:13.8
10	14	Espen Bjørnstad	Norway	1:06	23:09.5	13	24:15.5	+1:14.3
11	1	Ryōta Yamamoto	Japan	0:00	24:22.3	32	24:22.3	+1:21.1
12	12	Laurent Mühlethaler	France	0:54	23:34.5	23	24:28.5	+1:27.3
13	10	Ondřej Pažout	Czech Republic	0:41	23:48.3	26	24:29.3	+1:28.1
14	16	Vinzenz Geiger	Germany	1:09	23:26.8	18	24:35.8	+1:34.6
15	18	Aaron Kostner	Italy	1:14	23:21.9	15	24:35.9	+1:34.7
16	7	Yoshito Watabe	Japan	0:38	23:58.6	28	24:36.6	+1:35.4
17	24	Espen Andersen	Norway	1:36	23:06.6	9	24:42.6	+1:41.4
18	19	Hideaki Nagai	Japan	1:15	23:30.4	22	24:45.4	+1:44.2
19	5	Kristjan Ilves	Estonia	0:35	24:12.5	30	24:47.5	+1:46.3
20	23	Samuel Costa	Italy	1:35	23:13.2	14	24:48.2	+1:47.0
21	20	Martin Fritz	Austria	1:21	23:28.0	20	24:49.0	+1:47.8
22	17	Lukas Klapfer	Austria	1:12	23:46.5	25	24:58.5	+1:57.3
23	27	Antoine Gérard	France	1:52	23:06.8	10	24:58.8	+1:57.6
24	22	Matteo Baud	France	1:33	23:27.7	19	25:00.7	+1:59.5
25	33	Alessandro Pittin	Italy	2:21	23:07.8	12	25:28.8	+2:27.6
26	26	Perttu Reponen	Finland	1:38	23:55.8	27	25:33.8	+2:32.6
27	32	Jan Vytrval	Czech Republic	2:06	23:30.3	21	25:36.3	+2:35.1
28	15	Johannes Rydzek	Germany	1:09	24:41.3	39	25:50.3	+2:49.1
29	25	Szczepan Kupczak	Poland	1:37	24:22.8	34	25:59.8	+2:58.6
30	38	Taylor Fletcher	United States	3:15	23:00.2	8	26:15.2	+3:14.0
31	36	Raffaele Buzzi	Italy	2:58	23:22.7	16	26:20.7	+3:19.5
32	30	Tomáš Portyk	Czech Republic	1:59	24:32.3	36	26:31.3	+3:30.1
33	31	Ben Loomis	United States	2:04	24:32.4	37	26:36.4	+3:35.2
34	34	Otto Niittykoski	Finland	2:22	24:24.0	35	26:46.0	+3:44.8
35	28	Vid Vrhovnik	Slovenia	1:55	25:13.5	43	27:08.5	+4:07.3
36	42	Wille Karhumaa	Finland	3:44	23:41.5	24	27:25.5	+4:24.3
37	37	Jared Shumate	United States	3:04	24:22.4	33	27:26.4	+4:25.2
38	35	Andrzej Szczechowicz	Poland	2:29	24:58.2	41	27:27.2	+4:26.0
39	40	Viacheslav Barkov	Russian Ski Federation	3:38	24:12.3	29	27:50.3	+4:49.1
40	29	Gašper Brecl	Slovenia	1:58	26:08.4	48	28:06.4	+5:05.2
41	39	Dmytro Mazurchuk	Ukraine	3:31	24:58.5	42	28:29.5	+5:28.3
42	43	Aleksandr Milanin	Russian Ski Federation	3:53	24:40.7	38	28:33.7	+5:32.5
43	44	Jasper Good	United States	4:04	24:43.4	40	28:47.4	+5:46.2
44	41	Park Je-un	South Korea	3:41	25:43.3	46	29:24.3	+6:23.1
45	45	Andreas Ilves	Estonia	4:42	25:14.2	44	29:56.2	+6:55.0
46	51	Viktor Pasichnyk	Ukraine	5:44	24:19.2	31	30:03.2	+7:02.0
47	46	Artem Galunin	Russian Ski Federation	4:53	25:23.3	45	30:16.3	+7:15.1
48	49	Vitaliy Hrebeniuk	Ukraine	5:28	25:56.1	47	31:24.1	+8:22.9
49	48	Chingiz Rakparov	Kazakhstan	5:24	Lapped			
50	47	Markuss Vinogradovs	Latvia	4:57	Lapped			
51	50	Magzhan Amankeldiuly	Kazakhstan	5:41	Lapped			
52	52	Eldar Orussayev	Kazakhstan	6:31	Lapped			
53	53	Vyacheslav Bochkarev	Kazakhstan	6:54	Lapped			
