= Nordic combined at the 2022 Winter Olympics – Team large hill/4 × 5 km =

Team large hill/4 × 5 km at the XXIV Olympic Winter Games
- Nordic combined
- Venue: Kuyangshu Nordic Center and Biathlon Center, Zhangjiakou
- Date: 17 February 2022
- Competitors: 40 from 10 nations
- Teams: 10

Medalists
1st place, gold medalist(s)		Jørgen Graabak; Jens Lurås Oftebro; Espen Bjørnstad; Espen Andersen	Norway
2nd place, silver medalist(s)		Manuel Faißt; Eric Frenzel; Vinzenz Geiger; Julian Schmid	Germany
3rd place, bronze medalist(s)		Akito Watabe; Yoshito Watabe; Hideaki Nagai; Ryota Yamamoto	Japan

The team large hill/4 × 5 km competition in Nordic combined at the 2022 Winter Olympics was held on 17 February, at the Kuyangshu Nordic Center and Biathlon Center in Zhangjiakou. Jørgen Graabak, Jens Lurås Oftebro, Espen Bjørnstad, and Espen Andersen, representing Norway, won the event. Germany became the silver medalist, and Japan won the bronze.

Germany was the defending champion, with Norway and Austria being the 2018 silver and bronze medalist, respectively. Only one event of the 2021–22 FIS Nordic Combined World Cup was held before Olympics. Norway won, followed by Germany and Japan. Norway was the 2021 World Champion in Team normal hill/4 × 5 km, with Germany second and Austria third.

The main medal contenders, Norway, Germany, Austria, and Japan, finished the ski jumping close to each other and started the relay within 12 seconds of each other, with Austria going first. The next competitors, France, started one minute and a half behind. At the first exchange, Germany, Austria, and Japan were together, with Norway 5 seconds behind. They skied together the second leg, and in the third leg, Norway had 10 seconds advantage over Austria and Japan and 37 seconds over Germany. In the last leg, Jørgen Graabak increased the advantage to 55 seconds, and Norway finished in the gold medal position. Vinzenz Geiger caught up with Martin Fritz and Ryota Yamamoto, and the silver and bronze medals were decided at the finish line.

== Results ==
=== Ski jumping ===
The ski jumping part was held at 16:00.

Rank	Bib	Country	Distance (m)	Points	Time difference
1	8; 8–1; 8–2; 8–3; 8–4	Austria; Martin Fritz; Johannes Lamparter; Lukas Greiderer; Franz-Josef Rehrl	121.0; 140.0; 130.0; 141.0	475.4; 101.2; 125.5; 121.2; 127.5	–
2	9; 9–1; 9–2; 9–3; 9–4	Norway; Jørgen Graabak; Jens Lurås Oftebro; Espen Bjørnstad; Espen Andersen	125.5; 131.0; 133.5; 133.5	469.4; 112.7; 114.6; 122.4; 119.7	+0:08
3	10; 10–1; 10–2; 10–3; 10–4	Germany; Manuel Faißt; Eric Frenzel; Vinzenz Geiger; Julian Schmid	128.5; 132.0; 133.0; 131.5	467.0; 117.1; 108.8; 115.6; 125.5	+0:11
4	7; 7–1; 7–2; 7–3; 7–4	Japan; Akito Watabe; Yoshito Watabe; Hideaki Nagai; Ryota Yamamoto	125.0; 133.5; 128.5; 135.0	466.6; 109.1; 124.5; 111.6; 121.4	+0:12
5	4; 4–1; 4–2; 4–3; 4–4	France; Mattéo Baud; Gaël Blondeau; Antoine Gérard; Laurent Mühlethaler	130.0; 111.0; 125.5; 127.0	410.0; 114.9; 81.4; 103.2; 110.5	+1:27
6	2; 2–1; 2–2; 2–3; 2–4	Czech Republic; Ondřej Pažout; Jan Vytrval; Lukáš Daněk; Tomáš Portyk	127.5; 120.5; 122.0; 123.5	403.7; 105.7; 101.2; 97.1; 99.7	+1:36
7	5; 5–1; 5–2; 5–3; 5–4	United States; Jasper Good; Taylor Fletcher; Jared Shumate; Ben Loomis	114.5; 113.0; 128.0; 129.0	387.1; 80.9; 85.0; 108.1; 113.1	+1:58
8	6; 6–1; 6–2; 6–3; 6–4	Finland; Ilkka Herola; Arttu Mäkiaho; Perttu Reponen; Eero Hirvonen	118.0; 116.5; 123.0; 123.5	385.1; 94.7; 87.6; 98.7; 104.1	+2:00
9	3; 3–1; 3–2; 3–3; 3–4	Italy; Samuel Costa; Alessandro Pittin; Iacopo Bortolas; Raffaele Buzzi	110.5; 104.5; 116.0; 124.0	320.1; 72.2; 64.3; 86.4; 97.2	+3:27
10	1; 1–1; 1–2; 1–3; 1–4	China; Zhao Zihe; Zhao Jiawen; Guo Yuhao; Fan Haibin	98.0; 93.5; 81.5; 106.5	184.7; 54.6; 47.8; 16.0; 66.3	+6:28

=== Cross-country ===
The cross-country part was held at 19:00.

Rank	Bib	Country	Start time	Cross-country		Finish time	Deficit
Rank	Bib	Country	Start time	Time	Rank	Finish time	Deficit
1st place, gold medalist(s)	2; 2–1; 2–2; 2–3; 2–4	Norway; Espen Bjørnstad; Espen Andersen; Jens Lurås Oftebro; Jørgen Graabak	0:08	50:37.1; 12:52.3; 12:34.2; 12:19.5; 12:51.1	1	50:45.1	
2nd place, silver medalist(s)	3; 3–1; 3–2; 3–3; 3–4	Germany; Manuel Faißt; Julian Schmid; Eric Frenzel; Vinzenz Geiger	0:11	51:29.0; 12:44.7; 12:41.7; 12:53.5; 13:09.1	5	51:40:0	+54.9
3rd place, bronze medalist(s)	4; 4–1; 4–2; 4–3; 4–4	Japan; Yoshito Watabe; Hideaki Nagai; Akito Watabe; Ryota Yamamoto	0:12	51:28.3; 12:44.0; 12:41.8; 12:26.6; 13:35.9	4	51:40.3	+55.2
4	1; 1–1; 1–2; 1–3; 1–4	Austria; Franz-Josef Rehrl; Johannes Lamparter; Lukas Greiderer; Martin Fritz	0:00	51:44.7; 12:56.6; 12:36.6; 12:31.6; 13:39.9	8	51:44.7	+59.6
5	5; 5–1; 5–2; 5–3; 5–4	France; Gaël Blondeau; Mattéo Baud; Antoine Gérard; Laurent Mühlethaler	1:27	51:33.1; 12:46.5; 12:53.2; 12:40.3; 13:13.1	6	53:00.1	+2:15.0
6	7; 7–1; 7–2; 7–3; 7–4	United States; Taylor Fletcher; Ben Loomis; Jasper Good; Jared Shumate	1:58	51:09.1; 12:16.3; 12:52.3; 13:07.4; 12:53.1	2	53:07.1	+2:22.0
7	6; 6–1; 6–2; 6–3; 6–4	Czech Republic; Tomáš Portyk; Jan Vytrval; Ondřej Pažout; Lukáš Daněk	1:36	51:34.6; 12:59.9; 12:39.1; 13:04.2; 12:51.4	7	53:10.6	+2:25.5
8	8; 8–1; 8–2; 8–3; 8–4	Finland; Ilkka Herola; Arttu Mäkiaho; Eero Hirvonen; Perttu Reponen	2:00	51:24.1; 12:35.5; 12:51.3; 12:41.2; 13:16.1	3	53:24.1	+2:39.0
9	9; 9–1; 9–2; 9–3; 9–4	Italy; Iacopo Bortolas; Samuel Costa; Raffaele Buzzi; Alessandro Pittin	3:27	53:40.0; 14:00.6; 13:07.4; 13:13.1; 13:18.9	9	57:07.0	+6:21.9
10	10; 10–1; 10–2; 10–3; 10–4	China; Zhao Jiawen; Guo Yuhao; Zhao Zihe; Fan Haibin	6:28	58:07.1; 13:53.2; 13:42.7; 14:23.0; 16:08.2	10	1:04:35.1	+13:50.0
