= FIS Nordic Combined Grand Prix =

- Genre: Nordic combined
- Inaugurated: 26 August 1998; 28 years ago (Men); 18 August 2018; 8 years ago (Women)
- Organiser: International Ski Federation
- 2024 FIS Nordic Combined Grand Prix

The FIS Nordic Combined Grand Prix is a summer Nordic combined competition organized yearly by International Ski Federation. It was first arranged in 1998. The women's inaugural competition was organised in 2018. Since 2017 a skier has to compete in every event during a season to be eligible for the overall standings.

== Map of all grand prix hosts ==
All 21 locations which have been hosting grand prix events for men and ladies at least one time in the history of this competition. Chaux-Neuve is the newest addition to the calendar, debuting in 2024.

FIS Nordic Combined Grand Prix (Europe)	FIS Nordic Combined Grand Prix (Austria)

== Standings ==
The table below shows the three highest ranked skiers for each world cup season.

=== Men's ===
==== Overall ====
Season	Winner	Runner-up	Third
1998	(Germany) Matthias Looß	(Germany) Jens Gaiser (Austria) Felix Gottwald	
1999	(Germany) Ronny Ackermann	(Germany) Sebastian Haseney	(Germany) Jens Deimel
2000	(Austria) Felix Gottwald	(Finland) Samppa Lajunen	(Germany) Georg Hettich
2001	(Finland) Samppa Lajunen	(United States) Bill Demong	(Germany) Jens Gaiser
2002	(Austria) Mario Stecher	(Austria) Felix Gottwald	(United States) Todd Lodwick
2003	(Germany) Jens Gaiser	(United States) Todd Lodwick	(Germany) Ronny Ackermann
2004	(United States) Todd Lodwick	(Austria) Christoph Bieler	(United States) Johnny Spillane
2005	(Austria) Christoph Bieler	(Austria) Michael Gruber	(Norway) Petter Tande
2006	(Austria) Christoph Bieler	(Austria) Mario Stecher	(Austria) Felix Gottwald
2007	(Austria) David Kreiner	(France) Jason Lamy-Chappuis	(Germany) Björn Kircheisen
2008	(Austria) Mario Stecher	(Finland) Anssi Koivuranta	(Switzerland) Ronny Heer
2009	(Germany) Tino Edelmann	(France) Jonathan Félisaz	(Switzerland) Ronny Heer
2010	(Germany) Johannes Rydzek	(Norway) Magnus Moan	(Germany) Eric Frenzel
2011	(Germany) Johannes Rydzek	(Germany) Björn Kircheisen	(Germany) Eric Frenzel
2012	(Austria) Bernhard Gruber	(Japan) Akito Watabe	(Germany) Johannes Rydzek
2013	(Austria) Bernhard Gruber (Japan) Akito Watabe		(Germany) Johannes Rydzek
2014	(Germany) Johannes Rydzek	(Germany) Eric Frenzel	(Germany) Björn Kircheisen
2015	(Germany) Johannes Rydzek	(Germany) Fabian Rießle	(Japan) Akito Watabe
2016	(Norway) Jarl Magnus Riiber	(Austria) Mario Seidl	(France) François Braud
2017	(Estonia) Kristjan Ilves	(Austria) Martin Fritz	(Austria) Lukas Greiderer
2018	(Austria) Mario Seidl	(Finland) Ilkka Herola	(Austria) Martin Fritz
2019	(Austria) Franz-Josef Rehrl	(Italy) Samuel Costa	(France) Antoine Gérard
2020	Cancelled due to COVID-19 pandemic.		
2021	(Finland) Ilkka Herola	(Austria) Mario Seidl	(Germany) Johannes Rydzek
2022	(Finland) Ilkka Herola	(Austria) Franz-Josef Rehrl	(Austria) Stefan Rettenegger
2023	(Germany) Johannes Rydzek	(Austria) Franz-Josef Rehrl	(Germany) Terence Weber
2024	(France) Laurent Muhlethaler	(France) Matteo Baud	(Switzerland) Pascal Müller

Rank	Nation	Wins	Second	Third	Total
1	Austria	10	10	4	24
2	Germany	9	5	12	26
3	Finland	3	3	0	6
4	France	1	3	2	6
5	United States	1	2	2	5
6	Japan; Norway	1	1	1	3
8	Estonia	1	0	0	1
9	Italy	0	1	0	1
10	Switzerland	0	0	3	3

=== Women's ===
==== Overall ====
Season	Winner	Runner-up	Third
2018	(Russia) Stefaniya Nadymova (United States) Tara Geraghty-Moats		(Germany) Jenny Nowak
2019	(Russia) Stefaniya Nadymova	(United States) Tara Geraghty-Moats	(Germany) Jenny Nowak
2020	Cancelled due to COVID-19 pandemic.		
2021	(Norway) Gyda Westvold Hansen	(Slovenia) Ema Volavšek	(Austria) Lisa Hirner
2022	(Slovenia) Ema Volavšek	(Germany) Nathalie Armbruster	(Finland) Minja Korhonen
2023	(Slovenia) Ema Volavšek	(Germany) Nathalie Armbruster	(Norway) Ida Marie Hagen
2024	(Germany) Jenny Nowak	(Slovenia) Ema Volavšek	(Germany) Nathalie Armbruster

Rank	Nation	Wins	Second	Third	Total
1	Slovenia	2	2	0	4
2	Russia	2	0	0	2
3	Germany	1	2	3	6
4	United States	1	1	0	2
5	Norway	1	0	1	2
6	Austria; Finland	0	0	1	1

== See also ==
- FIS Nordic Combined World Cup
- FIS Nordic World Ski Championships
