= 2019–20 FIS Nordic Combined World Cup =

International skiing competition

Nordic Combined World Cup 2019/20
Winners
- Overall: (Norway) Jarl Magnus Riiber
- Ruka Tour: (Norway) Jarl Magnus Riiber
- Triple: (Norway) Jarl Magnus Riiber
- Best Jumper Trophy: (Norway) Jarl Magnus Riiber
- Best Skier Trophy: (Finland) Ilkka Herola
- Nations Cup: Norway

Competitions
- Venues: 9
- Individual: 17
- Team: 3

The 2019/20 FIS Nordic Combined World Cup was the 37th World Cup season, organized by the International Ski Federation. It started on 29 November 2019 in Ruka, Finland, and concluded on 7 March 2020 in Oslo, Norway.

== Calendar ==
=== Men ===
Num	Season	Date	Place	Hill	Discipline	Winner	Second	Third	Yellow bib	Ref.
527	1	29 November 2019	(Finland) Ruka	Rukatunturi	HS142 / 5 km	(Norway) Jarl Magnus Riiber	(Norway) Espen Bjørnstad	(Norway) Jens Lurås Oftebro	(Norway) Jarl Magnus Riiber	
528	2	30 November 2019	(Finland) Ruka	Rukatunturi	HS142 / 10 km	(Norway) Jarl Magnus Riiber	(Germany) Vinzenz Geiger	(Norway) Jens Lurås Oftebro	(Norway) Jarl Magnus Riiber	
529	3	1 December 2019	(Finland) Ruka	Rukatunturi	HS142 / 10 km	(Norway) Jarl Magnus Riiber	(Norway) Jørgen Graabak	(Norway) Jens Lurås Oftebro	(Norway) Jarl Magnus Riiber	
2nd Ruka Tour (29 November – 1 December 2019)						(Norway) Jarl Magnus Riiber	(Norway) Jens Lurås Oftebro	(Norway) Jørgen Graabak		
530	4	7 December 2019	(Norway) Lillehammer	Lysgårdsbakken	HS140 / 10 km	(Norway) Jarl Magnus Riiber	(Norway) Jørgen Graabak	(Germany) Fabian Rießle	(Norway) Jarl Magnus Riiber	
531	5	8 December 2019	(Norway) Lillehammer	Lysgårdsbakken	HS140 / 10 km	(Norway) Jarl Magnus Riiber	(Norway) Jørgen Graabak	(Germany) Vinzenz Geiger	(Norway) Jarl Magnus Riiber	
532	6	21 December 2019	(Austria) Ramsau	W90-Mattensprunganlage	HS98 / 10 km	(Germany) Vinzenz Geiger	(Norway) Jarl Magnus Riiber	(Germany) Fabian Rießle	(Norway) Jarl Magnus Riiber	
533	7	22 December 2019	(Austria) Ramsau	W90-Mattensprunganlage	HS98 / 10 km	(Norway) Jarl Magnus Riiber	(Norway) Jørgen Graabak	(Germany) Vinzenz Geiger	(Norway) Jarl Magnus Riiber	
534	8	10 January 2020	(Italy) Val di Fiemme	Trampolino dal Ben	HS104 / 10 km	(Norway) Jarl Magnus Riiber	(Germany) Vinzenz Geiger	(Norway) Jørgen Graabak	(Norway) Jarl Magnus Riiber	
535	9	11 January 2020	(Italy) Val di Fiemme	Trampolino dal Ben	HS104 / 10 km	(Germany) Vinzenz Geiger	(Norway) Jarl Magnus Riiber	(Norway) Jørgen Graabak	(Norway) Jarl Magnus Riiber	
536	10	26 January 2020	(Germany) Oberstdorf	Schattenberg	HS137 / 10 km	(Norway) Jarl Magnus Riiber	(Norway) Jens Lurås Oftebro	(Austria) Franz-Josef Rehrl	(Norway) Jarl Magnus Riiber	
537	11	31 January 2020	(Austria) Seefeld	Toni-Seelos-Olympiaschanze	HS109 / 5 km	(Norway) Jarl Magnus Riiber	(Germany) Vinzenz Geiger	(Norway) Jørgen Graabak	(Norway) Jarl Magnus Riiber	
538	12	1 February 2020	(Austria) Seefeld	Toni-Seelos-Olympiaschanze	HS109 / 10 km	(Norway) Jarl Magnus Riiber	(Norway) Jørgen Graabak	(Germany) Vinzenz Geiger	(Norway) Jarl Magnus Riiber	
539	13	2 February 2020	(Austria) Seefeld	Toni-Seelos-Olympiaschanze	HS109 / 15 km	(Norway) Jarl Magnus Riiber	(Norway) Jørgen Graabak	(Germany) Vinzenz Geiger	(Norway) Jarl Magnus Riiber	
7th Nordic Combined Triple (31 January-2 February 2020)						(Norway) Jarl Magnus Riiber	(Norway) Jørgen Graabak	(Germany) Vinzenz Geiger		
		8 February 2020	(Estonia) Otepää	Tehvandi	HS100 / 10 km	cancelled				
		9 February 2020	(Estonia) Otepää	Tehvandi	HS100 / 10 km	cancelled				
540	14	22 February 2020	(Norway) Trondheim	Granåsen	HS138 / 10 km	(Norway) Jarl Magnus Riiber	(Norway) Jørgen Graabak	(Finland) Ilkka Herola	(Norway) Jarl Magnus Riiber	
541	15	23 February 2020	(Norway) Trondheim	Granåsen	HS138 / 10 km	(Norway) Jarl Magnus Riiber	(Norway) Jens Lurås Oftebro	(Norway) Espen Bjørnstad	(Norway) Jarl Magnus Riiber	
542	16	1 March 2020	(Finland) Lahti	Salpausselkä	HS130 / 10 km	(Japan) Akito Watabe	(Norway) Jørgen Graabak	(Germany) Vinzenz Geiger	(Norway) Jarl Magnus Riiber	
543	17	7 March 2020	(Norway) Oslo	Holmenkollbakken	HS134 / 10 km	(Norway) Jarl Magnus Riiber	(Germany) Fabian Rießle	(Finland) Ilkka Herola	(Norway) Jarl Magnus Riiber	
		14 March 2020	(Germany) Schonach	Langenwaldschanze	HS106 / 10 km	cancelled				
		15 March 2020	(Germany) Schonach	Langenwaldschanze	HS106 / 15 km	cancelled				

=== Men's team ===
Num	Season	Date	Place	Hill	Discipline	Winner	Second	Third	Yellow bib	Ref.
44	1	12 January 2020	(Italy) Val di Fiemme	Trampolino dal Ben	HS104 / 2x7.5 km Sprint	Norway I Jørgen Graabak; Jarl Magnus Riiber	Germany I Fabian Rießle; Vinzenz Geiger	Austria II Lukas Greiderer; Martin Fritz	Norway	
45	2	25 January 2020	(Germany) Oberstdorf	Schattenberg	HS 137 / 4x5 km Relay	Norway Espen Bjørnstad; Jens Lurås Oftebro; Jørgen Graabak; Jarl Magnus Riiber	Germany Fabian Rießle; Johannes Rydzek; Manuel Faißt; Vinzenz Geiger	Japan Akito Watabe; Ryōta Yamamoto; Hideaki Nagai; Yoshito Watabe	Norway	
46	3	29 February 2020	(Finland) Lahti	Salpausselkä	HS130 / 2x7.5 km Sprint	Norway I Jørgen Graabak; Jarl Magnus Riiber	Germany I Terence Weber; Manuel Faißt	Germany II Johannes Rydzek; Vinzenz Geiger	Norway	

== Standings ==
=== Overall ===
Rank	after all 17 events	Points
1	(Norway) Jarl Magnus Riiber	1586
2	(Norway) Jørgen Graabak	1106
3	(Germany) Vinzenz Geiger	917
4	(Norway) Jens Lurås Oftebro	790
5	(Germany) Fabian Rießle	658
6	(Norway) Espen Bjørnstad	606
7	(Germany) Eric Frenzel	565
8	(Finland) Ilkka Herola	564
9	(Japan) Akito Watabe	449
10	(Germany) Manuel Faißt	418

=== Best Jumper Trophy ===
Rank	after all 17 events	Points
1	(Norway) Jarl Magnus Riiber	1480
2	(Norway) Jens Lurås Oftebro	1052
3	(Norway) Espen Bjørnstad	889
4	(Austria) Franz-Josef Rehrl	710
5	(Japan) Akito Watabe	635
6	(Austria) Martin Fritz	517
7	(Japan) Ryōta Yamamoto	507
8	(Norway) Jørgen Graabak	499
9	(Germany) Manuel Faißt	489
10	(Germany) Vinzenz Geiger	368

=== Best Skier Trophy ===
Rank	after all 17 events	Points
1	(Finland) Ilkka Herola	1017
2	(Italy) Alessandro Pittin	939
3	(Germany) Eric Frenzel	925
4	(Norway) Jørgen Graabak	886
5	(Germany) Vinzenz Geiger	846
6	(Germany) Johannes Rydzek	756
7	(Germany) Fabian Rießle	652
8	(Finland) Eero Hirvonen	544
9	(Austria) Lukas Greiderer	513
10	(Italy) Samuel Costa	395

=== Nations Cup ===
Rank	after all 20 events	Points
1	Norway	5660
2	Germany	3826
3	Austria	2517
4	Japan	1311
5	Finland	1054
6	Italy	622
7	France	368
8	Czech Republic	305
9	Estonia	56
10	United States	55

=== Prize money ===
Rank	after all 24 payouts	CHF
1	(Norway) Jarl Magnus Riiber	163.200
2	(Norway) Jørgen Graabak	97.300
3	(Germany) Vinzenz Geiger	71.450
4	(Norway) Jens Lurås Oftebro	54.500
5	(Germany) Fabian Rießle	40.974
6	(Norway) Espen Bjørnstad	32.330
7	(Finland) Ilkka Herola	29.660
8	(Germany) Eric Frenzel	22.610
9	(Japan) Akito Watabe	21.355
10	(Germany) Manuel Faißt	20.432

== Achievements ==
First World Cup career victory

First World Cup podium

- Jens Lurås Oftebro (NOR), 19, in his 3rd season – no. 3 in the WC 1 in Ruka

Victories in this World Cup (in brackets victory for all time)

- Jarl Magnus Riiber (NOR), 14 (27) first places
- Vinzenz Geiger (GER), 2 (3) first places
- Akito Watabe (JPN), 1 (18) first place

== Retirements ==
Following are notable Nordic combined skiers who announced their retirement:

- Adam Cieślar (POL)
- Paul Gerstgraser (AUT)
- Nathaniel Mah (CAN)
- Wojciech Marusarz (POL)
- Constantin Schnurr (GER)
- Paweł Twardosz (POL)
- Lilian Vaxelaire (FRA)
- Lukas Runggaldier (ITA)
- Sindre Ure Søtvik (NOR)
