= Manuel Faißt =

German Nordic combined athlete (born 1993)

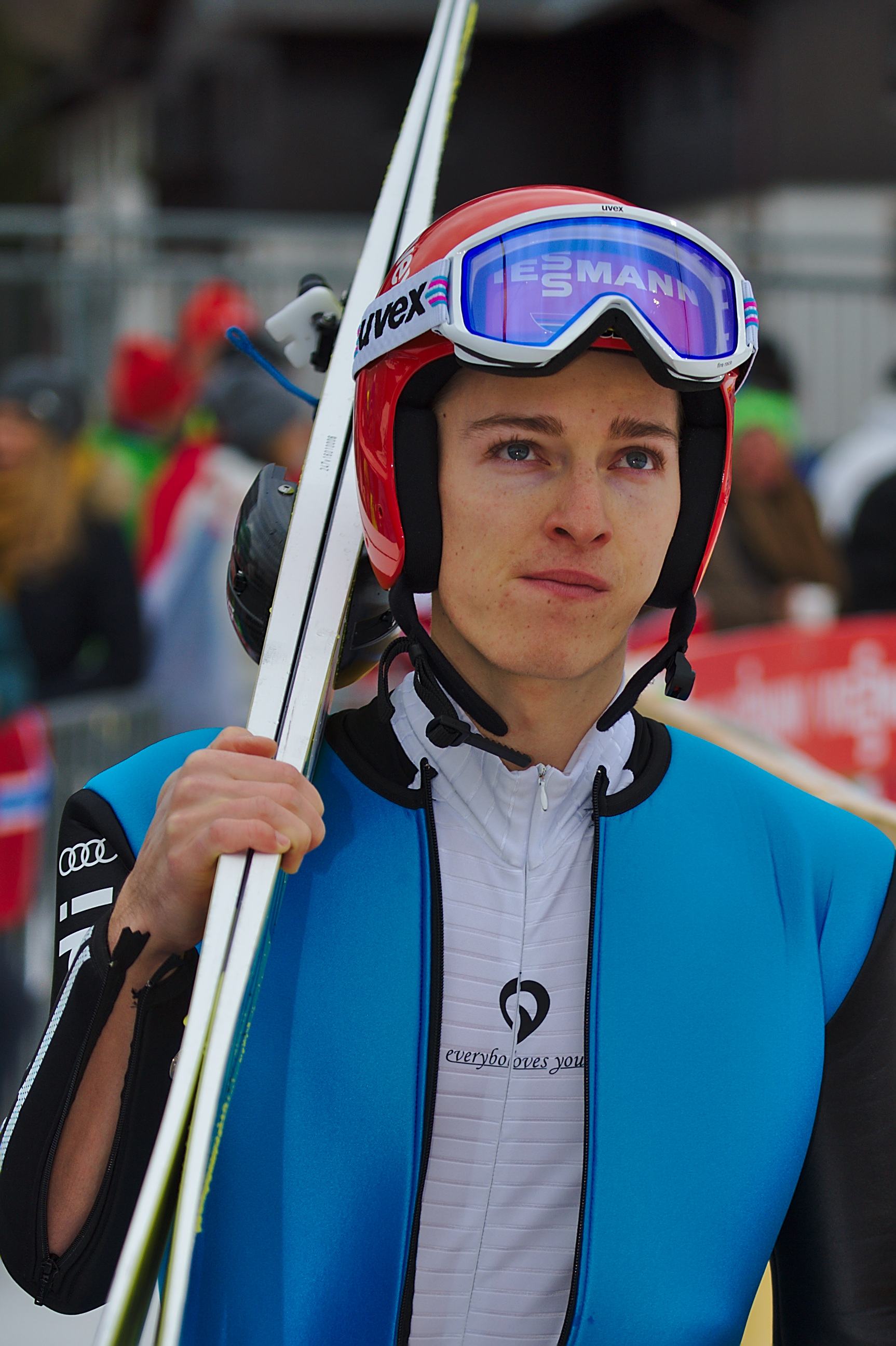
- Faißt in 2016

Personal information
- Nationality: Germany
- Born: 11 January 1993 (age 33) Furtwangen im Schwarzwald, Germany
- Height: 1.71 m (5 ft 7 in)

Sport
- Sport: Skiing
- Club: SV Baiersbronn

World Cup career
- Seasons: 2012–present
- Indiv. starts: 223
- Indiv. podiums: 7
- Indiv. wins: 0
- Team starts: 13
- Team podiums: 8
- Team wins: 1
- Overall titles: 0 – (10th in 2019, 2020, 2021 and 2023)
- Discipline titles: 0

Achievements and titles
- Personal bests: 227.5 m (746 ft); Oberstdorf, 17 March 2022
Medal record
Men's Nordic combined
Representing Germany
Olympic Games
| Silver medal – second place | 2022 Beijing | Team LH |

Manuel Faißt (born 11 January 1993) is a German Nordic combined athlete.

== Career ==
Faißt has relations to other people who are Nordic combined athletes. His father has been a Nordic combined athlete himself and worked as a coach at Faißt's home club of Baiersbronn. 4-year-old Manuel skied down the outrun of the 10-metre hill at Bergergrund and at age 5, he had already made his first jumps. Soon, Faißt's ambitious personality paid off, and he started collecting medals and trophies from competitions that he won, even in his younger years. In 2009, Faißt won the European Youth Olympic Festival in Szczyrk and the OPA Games at his home venue in Baiersbronn, as well as making his debut in the World Cup at Lillehammer. He achieved his first World Cup Top Ten result in 2011 at Ramsau am Dachstein with a career-best seventh rank.

In his most successful season so far (2012/13), Faißt dominated the Junior World Championships at Liberec, walking away with all possible gold medals in the two individual and one team event as well as getting started at university in Freiburg where Faißt studied law.

== Personal life ==
Faißt's hobbies include biking, cooking, and football.

== Olympic Games results ==
| Year | Individual NH | Individual LH | Team LH |
|---|---|---|---|
| 2022 | — | 4 | Silver |

== World Championship results ==
| Year | Individual LH | Individual NH | Team NH | Team sprint/ Mixed team |
|---|---|---|---|---|
| 2017 | — | 17 | — | — |
| 2019 | 14 | — | — | — |
| 2021 | 19 | — | — | — |
| 2023 | 20 | 5 | — | — |
| 2025 | 22 | — | — | — |

=== Individual podiums ===
| No. | Season | Date | Location | Discipline | Place |
|---|---|---|---|---|---|
| 1 | 2015-16 | 20 December 2015 | (Austria) Ramsau | HS98 / 10 km | 3rd |
| 2 | 2016-17 | 11 February 2017 | (Japan) Sapporo | HS134/ 10 km | 3rd |
| 3 | 2017-18 | 3 February 2018 | (Japan) Hakuba | HS134/ 10 km | 3rd |
| 4 | 2020-21 | 29 November 2020 | (Finland) Ruka | HS142 / 10 km | 3rd |
| 5 | 2021-22 | 11 December 2021 | (Estonia) Otepää | HS97 / 10 km | 3rd |
| 6 | 2023-24 | 15 December 2023 | (Austria) Ramsau | HS98 / 10 km | 3rd |
| 7 | 2023-24 | 14 January 2024 | (Germany) Oberstdorf | HS106 / 7.5 km | 3rd |

=== Team podiums ===
| No. | Season | Date | Location | Discipline | Place |
|---|---|---|---|---|---|
| 1 | 2012-13 | 3 February 2013 | (Russia) Sochi | HS140 / 4x5 km | 1st |
| 2 | 2013-14 | 1 December 2013 | (Finland) Ruka | HS142 / 4x5 km | 2nd |
| 3 | 2014-15 | 31 January 2015 | (Italy) Val di Fiemme | HS134 / 2x7.5 km | 2nd |
| 4 | 2015-16 | 4 March 2016 | (Germany) Schonach | HS106 / 4x5 km | 2nd |
| 5 | 2019-20 | 25 January 2020 | (Germany) Oberstdorf | HS140 / 4x5 km | 2nd |
| 6 | 2019-20 | 29 February 2020 | (Finland) Lahti | HS130 / 2x7.5 km | 2nd |
| 7 | 2021-22 | 4 December 2021 | (Norway) Lillehammer | HS98 / 4x5 km | 2nd |
| 8 | 2022-23 | 6 January 2023 | (Estonia) Otepää | HS97 / 2x2.5 km+ km2x5 km | 2nd |
