= Ilkka Herola =

Finnish Nordic combined skier

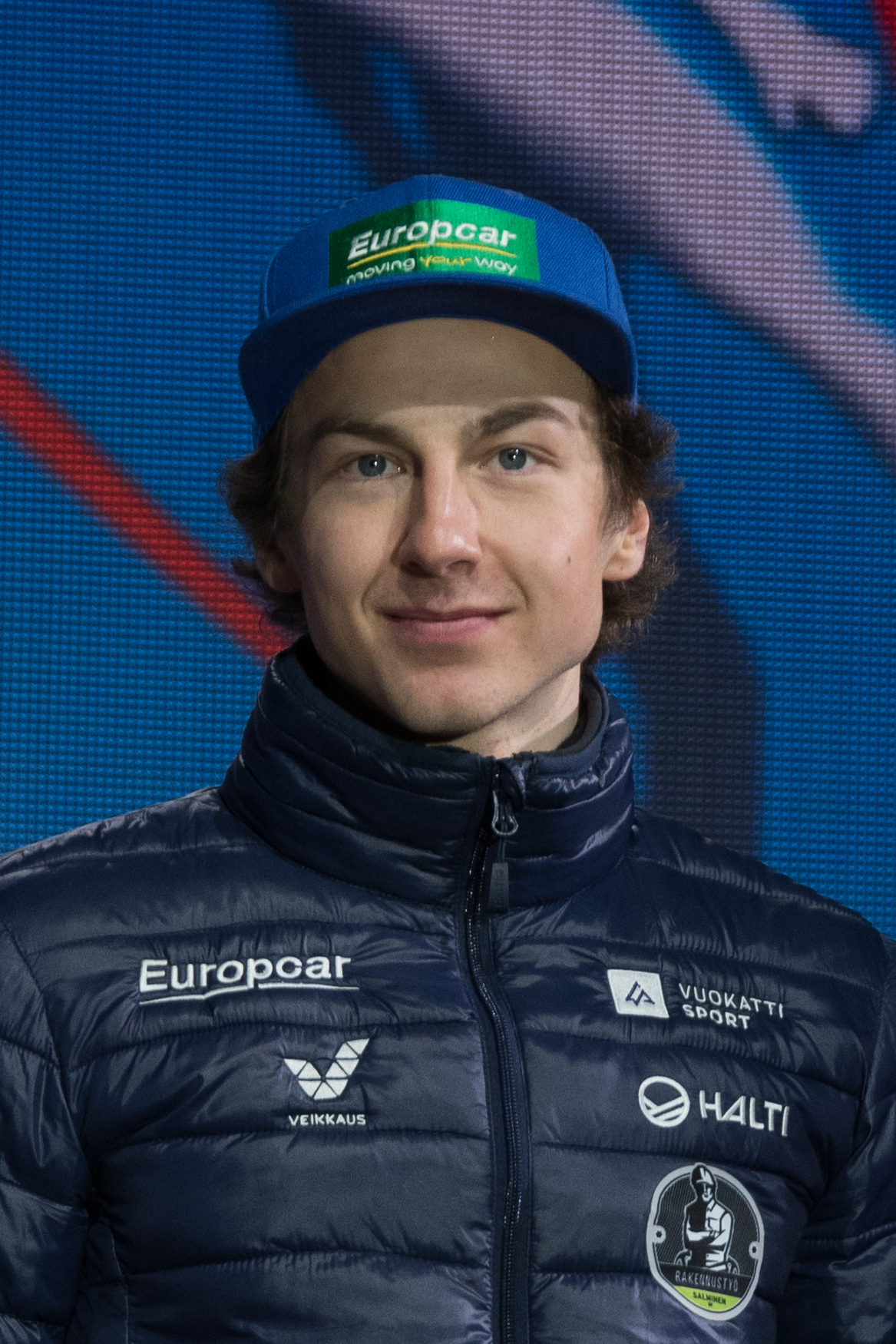
- Herola in 2019

Personal information
- Born: 22 June 1995 (age 31) Siilinjärvi, Finland
- Height: 1.72 m (5 ft 8 in)

Sport
- Sport: Skiing
- Club: Puijon Hiihtoseura

World Cup career
- Seasons: 2014–
- Indiv. starts: 220
- Indiv. podiums: 14
- Indiv. wins: 2
Medal record
Men's Nordic combined
Representing Finland
Olympic Games
Silver medal – second place	2026 Milano Cortina	Team LH
Bronze medal – third place	2026 Milano Cortina	Individual LH
World Championships
Silver medal – second place	2021 Oberstdorf	Individual NH
- Updated on 19 February 2026

Ilkka Herola (born 22 June 1995) is a Finnish Nordic combined skier. He won a silver medal in the men's team Nordic combined and a bronze medal in the men's individual large hill Nordic combined at the 2026 Winter Olympics.

== Career ==
He competed at the FIS Nordic World Ski Championships 2013 in Val di Fiemme, and at the 2014 Winter Olympics in Sochi.

Together with Eero Hirvonen, he won the 2 x 7.5 km team sprint on 9 February 2019, in front of their home crowd in Lahti.

In 2025, Ilkka Herola ended the Finns' winless streak. Fifteen years had passed since the previous victory. The last Finn who win was Hannu Manninen's victory in the 2009-10 season in Salpausselkä.

== Nordic combined results ==
- All results are sourced from FIS.

=== Olympic Games ===
- 2 medals – (1 silver, 1 bronze)

Year	Age	Individual NH	Individual LH	Team LH
2014	18	16	14	—
2018	22	8	18	6
2022	26	6	16	8
2026	30	5	Bronze	Silver

=== World Championships ===
Year	Individual NH	Individual LH	Team NH	Team sprint LH	Mixed team NH
2013	27	22	8	11	Not held
2015	23	16	9	4	Not held
2017	12	17	5	7	Not held
2019	5	11	5	7	Not held
2021	Silver	6	5	5	Not held
2023	18	9	5	Not held	6
2025	12	5	4	Not held	5

=== Season standings ===
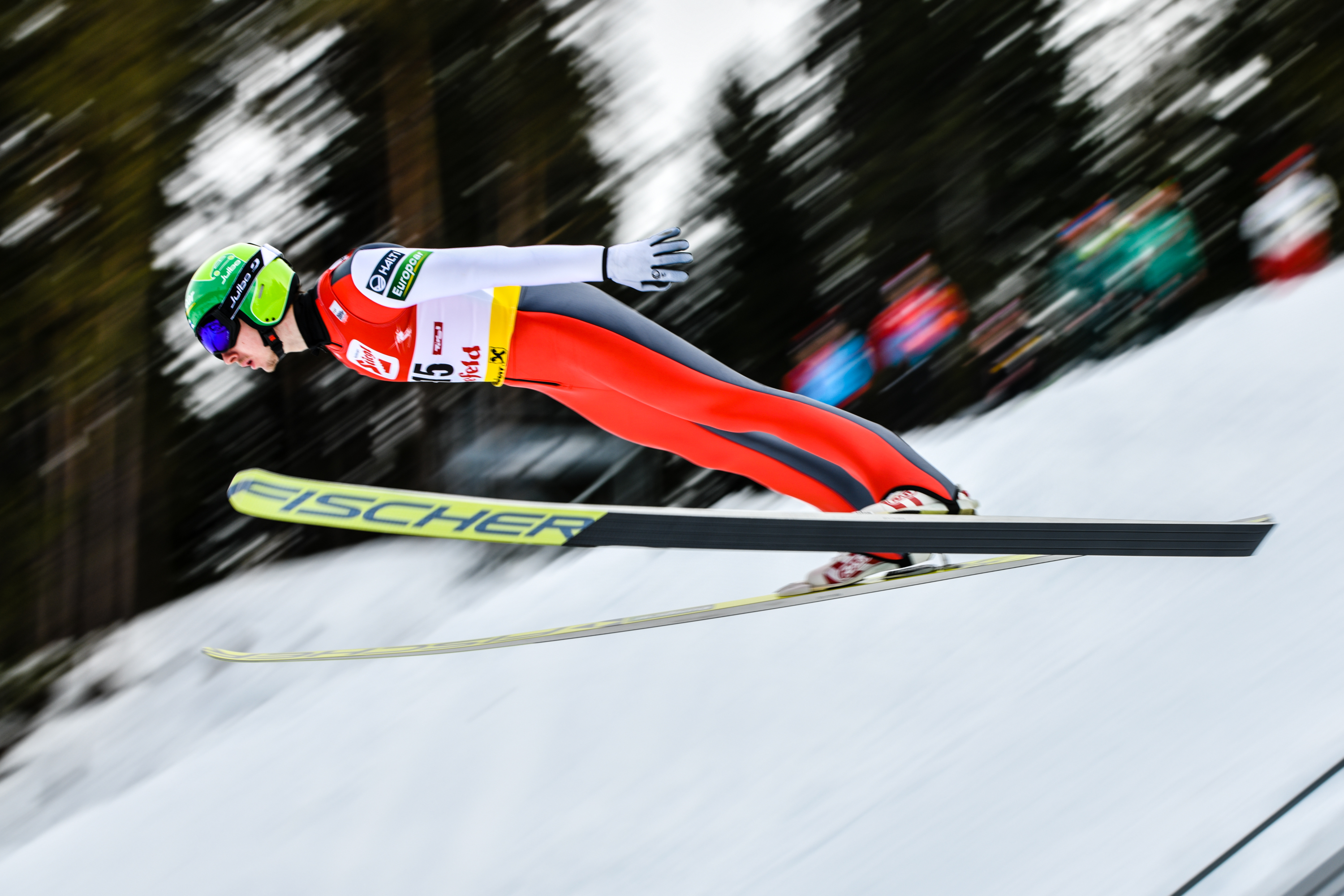
Ilkka Herola was ski jumping section in Seefeld, January 2018.

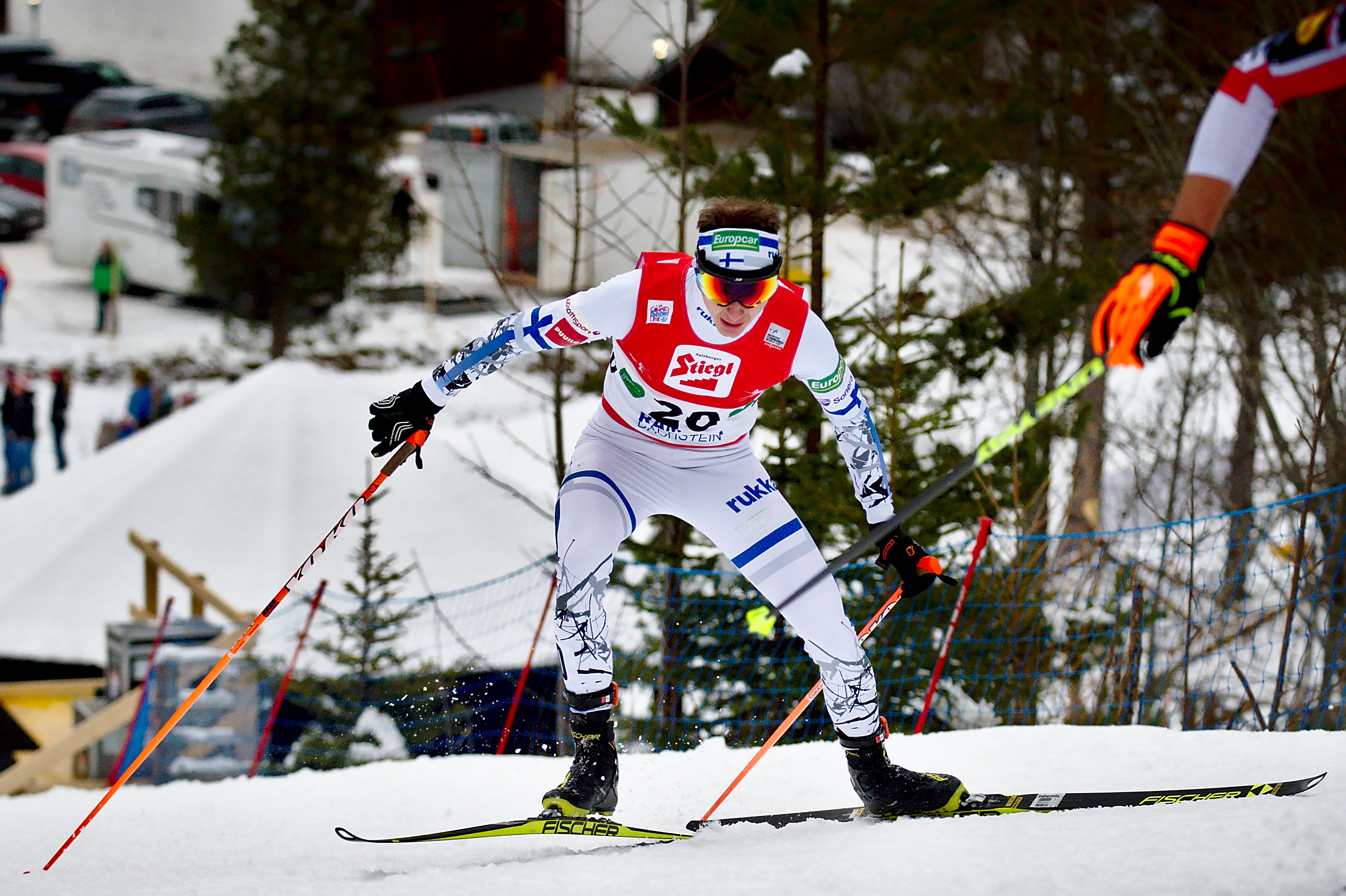
Herola in Ramsau 2016.

Season	Overall	Best Jumper Trophy	Best Skier Trophy
2012–13	40th	N/A	N/A
2013–14	22nd	N/A	N/A
2014–15	17th	N/A	N/A
2015–16	10th	N/A	N/A
2016–17	7th	N/A	N/A
2017–18	10th	30th	2nd
2018–19	11th	30th	3rd
2019–20	8th	18th	1st
2020–21	7th	17th	1st
2021–22	9th	24th	1st
2022–23	9th	16th	4th
2023–24	13th	19th	4th
2024–25	5th	10th	6th

=== Individual Podiums ===
Season	Date	Location	Discipline	Place
2015–16	5 December 2015	(Norway) Lillehammer	HS138/10 km	3rd
2017–18	20 January 2018	(France) Chaux-Neuve	HS118/10 km	3rd
2018–19	3 February 2019	(Germany) Klingenthal	HS140/10 km	2nd
2018–19	9 March 2019	(Norway) Oslo	HS134/10 km	2nd
2019–20	22 February 2020	(Norway) Trondheim	HS138/10 km	3rd
2019–20	7 March 2020	(Norway) Oslo	HS134/10 km	3rd
2020–21	15 January 2021	(Italy) Val di Fiemme	HS106/10 km	2nd
2020–21	30 January 2021	(Austria) Seefeld	HS109/10 km	3rd
2020–21	31 January 2021	(Austria) Seefeld	HS109/15 km	2nd
2021–22	18 December 2021	(Austria) Ramsau	HS98/10 km	3rd
2022–23	7 January 2023	(Estonia) Otepää	10 km/HS97	2nd
2024–25	21 December 2024	(Austria) Ramsau	HS98/10 km	2nd
2024–25	18 January 2025	(Germany) Schonach	HS100/10 km	3rd
2024–25	16 March 2025	(Norway) Oslo	COM HS134/7.5 km	1st
2024–25	21 March 2025	(Finland) Lahti	HS130/10 km	2nd
2025–26	28 November 2025	(Finland) Ruka	HS142/7.5 km	3rd
2025–26	November 2025	(Finland) Ruka		3rd
2025–26	27 February 2026	(Austria) Bad Mitterndorf	HS235/7.5 km	1st
2025–26	6 March 2026	(Finland) Lahti	HS130/10 km	3rd

=== Team Podiums ===
Season	Date	Location	Discipline	Place	Team member(s)
2017–18	21 January 2018	(France) Chaux-Neuve	HS118/4x5km	3rd	Leevi Mutru, Arttu Mäkiaho, Eero Hirvonen
2017–18	3 March 2018	(Finland) Lahti	HS130/2x7,5 km	3rd	Eero Hirvonen
2018–19	9 February 2019	(Finland) Lahti	HS130/2x7,5 km	1st	Eero Hirvonen
2020–21	16 January 2021	(Italy) Val di Fiemme	HS106/2x7,5 km	3rd	Eero Hirvonen
2025–26	16 January 2026	(Finland) Lahti	HS130/2x6km	2nd	Minja Korhonen
