= Vitaliy Hrebeniuk =

Ukrainian Nordic combined skier

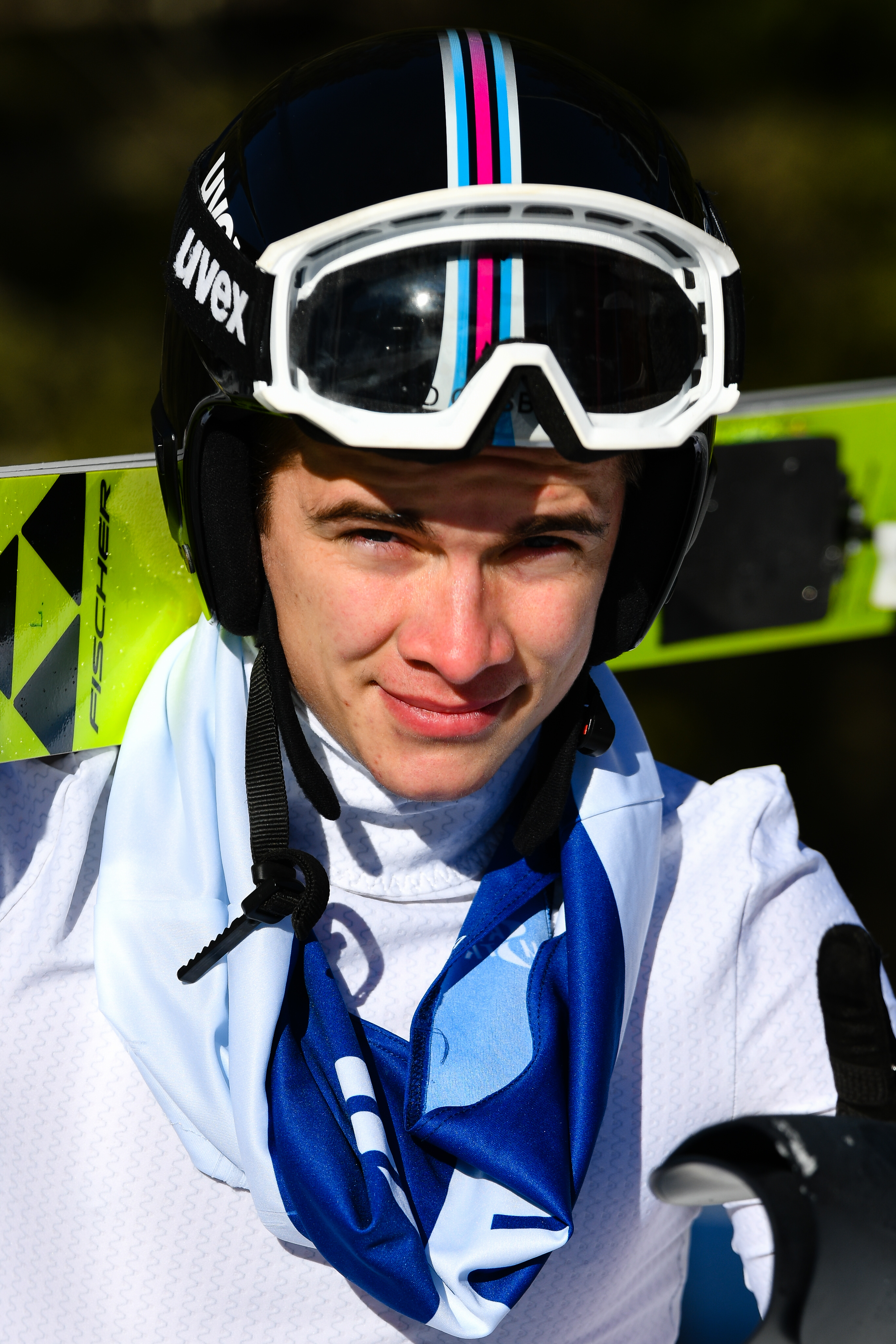
- Hrebeniuk in 2020 during Continental Cup competitions in Eisenerz

Personal information
- Full name: Віталій Гребенюк
- Born: 27 September 2001 (age 24) Kremenets, Ternopil Oblast, Ukraine

Sport
- Sport: Skiing
Medal record
Men's Nordic combined
Representing Ukraine
Winter Universiade
Bronze medal – third place	2023 Lake Placid	Men's team sprint
- Updated on 25 February 2023

Vitaliy Hrebeniuk (Ukrainian: Віталій Гребенюк; born 27 September 2001 in Kremenets, Ukraine) is a Ukrainian Nordic combined skier. He is bronze medallist of the 2023 Winter World University Games.

== Career ==
Hrebeniuk started his international career when he competed at the 2018 Junior World Championships in Kandersteg, Switzerland, where he was 50th in the NH/10 km competition. He participated at four Junior World Championships between 2018 and 2021. His best personal results were 33rd in HN/10 km and NH/10 km competitions in both 2020 and 2021. He later participated at Senior World Championships.

At the 2023 Winter World University Games, Hrebeniuk finished 6th in the normal hill/10 km and 6th in the mass start 10 km/normal hill. On 17 January, he won a bronze medal in the team sprint event with Dmytro Mazurchuk, which was the first-ever medal for Ukraine in this sport at the Winter Universiades. He represented Lviv State University of Physical Culture.

== Results ==
=== World Championships ===
Year	Event	NH	LH	Team	Team sprint
2021	Oberstdorf, Germany	48	48	11	
2023	Planica, Slovenia				
