= Jasper Good =

American Nordic combined skier (born 1996)

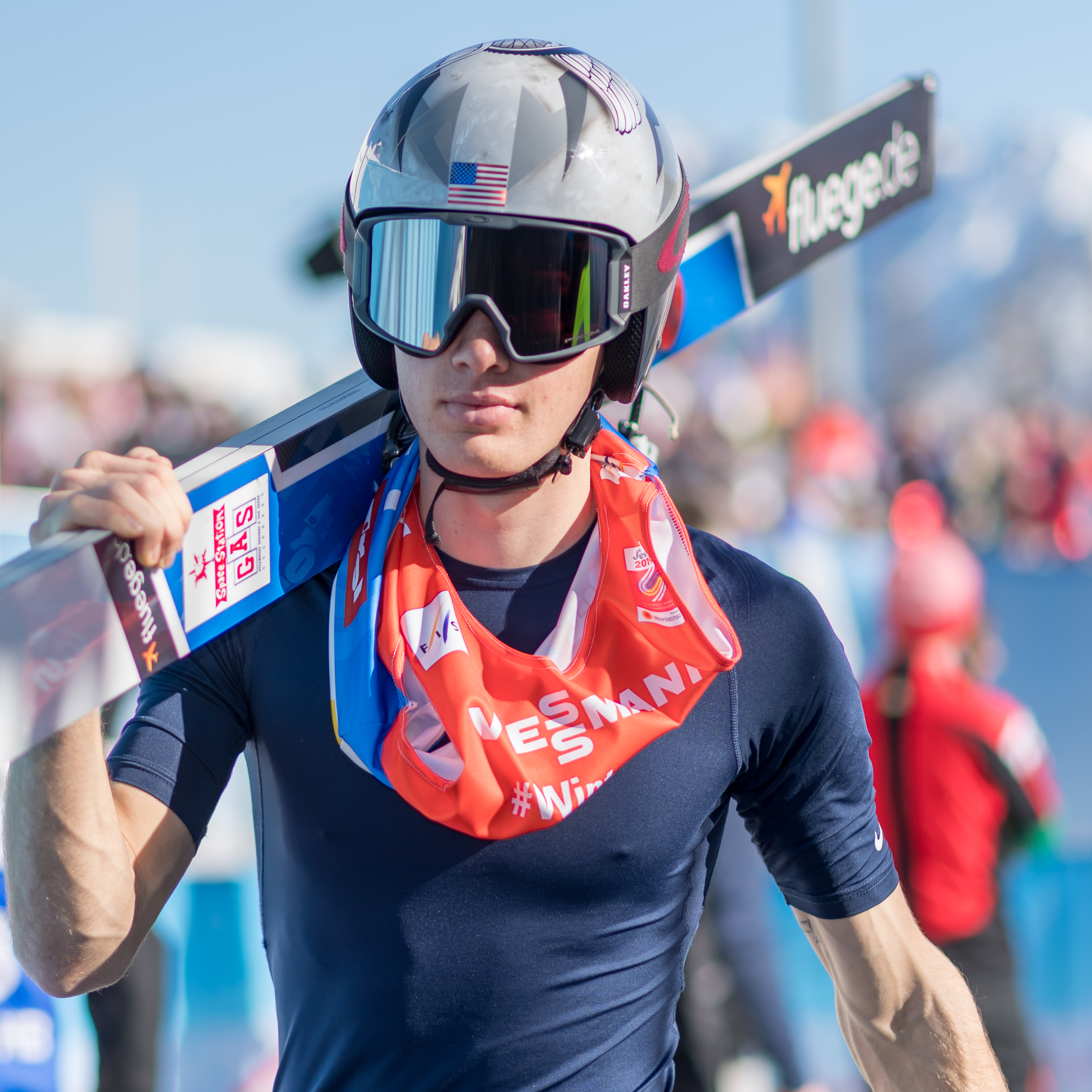
- Seefeld, February 28, 2019: FIS Nordic World Ski Championships, Nordic Combined.

Personal information
- Born: May 10, 1996 (age 30) Steamboat Springs, Colorado, U.S.

Sport
- Country: United States
- Sport: Nordic combined skiing
- Club: U.S. Army WCAP

Jasper Good (born May 10, 1996) is an American Nordic combined skier.

He competed at the 2018 Winter Olympics. He also competed at the 2022 Winter Olympics.

== Personal life ==
Good was a Nordic Combined Skier from Steamboat Spring, CO
