= Arttu Mäkiaho =

Finnish Nordic combined skier (born 1997)

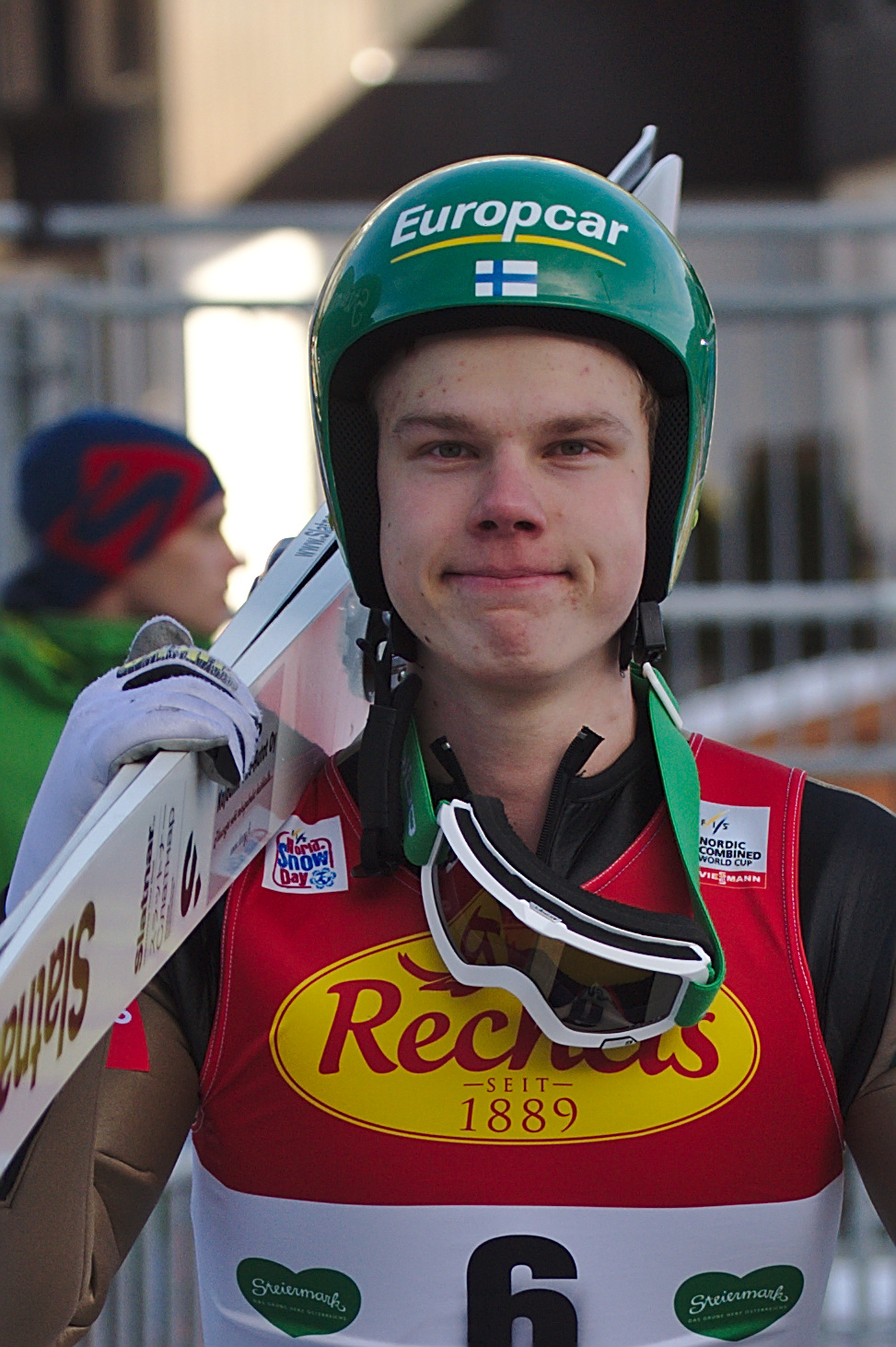
- Mäkiaho in 2016

Personal information
- Born: 16 September 1997 (age 27); Kajaani, Finland

Sport
- Country: Finland
- Sport: Nordic combined skiing

Arttu Mäkiaho (born 16 September 1997) is a Finnish Nordic combined skier who competes internationally, notably having competed in the 2018 Winter Olympics.
