= FIS Nordic World Ski Championships 2025 =

Ski competition

- Host city: Trondheim
- Country: Norway
- Events: 31
- Opening: 26 February 2025
- Closing: 9 March 2025
- Main venue: Granåsen Ski Centre
- Website: https://trondheim2025.no/en/

The 44th FIS Nordic World Ski Championships was held from 26 February to 9 March 2025 in Trondheim, Norway.

== Host selection ==
The location was scheduled to be decided in May 2020 during the 52nd FIS Congress in Pattaya, Thailand, but that was cancelled due to the COVID-19 pandemic. The vote instead took place during a video conference on 3 October 2020. Trondheim won the bid to host the event unanimously as there were no opposing bids submitted. This was the second time the city is hosting the Championships, having hosted it in 1997. The city had also submitted a bid for 2023, but lost out to Planica, Slovenia. It was the sixth time for Norway to host the Championships.

The Granåsen Ski Centre, which was also used during Trondheim's hosting of the 1997 Championships, was the main venue where the competitions were held.

== Schedule ==
=== Event changes ===
For the first time in the history of the FIS Nordic World Ski Championships, all cross-country events were held at the same distance for both men and women. This was approved by the FIS Council during their spring meeting ahead of the 54th Congress. Equal distances for both men and women have already been used starting with the 2023–24 World Cup.

In the Nordic combined, the normal hill + 10 kilometre Gundersen event was dropped in favour of the normal hill + 7.5 kilometre compact event. The mass start + normal hill event made its return as part of the women's program with a distance of 5 km.

In addition, the Para-sprint competitions for men and women was a part of the Championships' program this year, as opposed to being part of the World Para Nordic Skiing Championships.

=== Event schedule ===
All times are local (UTC+1).

| | | February | | | March | | | | | | | | | | Events |
| | | 26th Wed | 27th Thu | 28th Fri | 1st Sat | 2nd Sun | 3rd Mon | 4th Tue | 5th Wed | 6th Thu | 7th Fri | 8th Sat | | 9th Sun | Events |
|---|---|---|---|---|---|---|---|---|---|---|---|---|---|---|---|
| Ceremonies | | OC | | | | | D A Y O F F | | | | | | | CC | — |
| Ski jumping | Normal hill individual | | Q^{W} | W | Q^{M} | M | D A Y O F F | | | | | | | | 7 |
| Ski jumping | Large hill individual | | | | | | D A Y O F F | | | Q^{W} | W | Q^{M} | M | | 7 |
| Ski jumping | Team normal hill | | | | W | | D A Y O F F | | | | | | | | 7 |
| Ski jumping | Team large hill | | | | | | D A Y O F F | | | M | | | | | 7 |
| Ski jumping | Mixed team large | | | | | | D A Y O F F | | M / W | | | | | | 7 |
| Nordic combined | Normal hill individual | | | | M | W | D A Y O F F | | | | | | | | 6 |
| Nordic combined | Normal hill mass start | | W | | | | D A Y O F F | | | | | | | | 6 |
| Nordic combined | Mixed team normal | | | M / W | | | D A Y O F F | | | | | | | | 6 |
| Nordic combined | Team large hill | | | | | | D A Y O F F | | | | M | | | | 6 |
| Nordic combined | Large hill individual | | | | | | D A Y O F F | | | | | M | | | 6 |
| Cross-country | Sprint free | | M, W | | | | D A Y O F F | | | | | | | | 12 |
| Cross-country | Skiathlon | | | | M | W | D A Y O F F | | | | | | | | 12 |
| Cross-country | Individual classic | Q^{W, M} | | | | | D A Y O F F | M, W | | | | | | | 12 |
| Cross-country | Team sprint classic | | | | | | D A Y O F F | | M, W | | | | | | 12 |
| Cross-country | Relay | | | | | | D A Y O F F | | | M | W | | | | 12 |
| Cross-country | Mass start free | | | | | | D A Y O F F | | | | | M | | W | 12 |
| Para cross-country | Sprint classic | | | | | | D A Y O F F | Q^{W, M} | M, W | | | | | | 6 |

=== Ski jumping ===
| Date | Time | Event |
|---|---|---|
| 27 February | 20:30 | Women's individual normal hill qualification |
| 28 February | 14:00 | Women's individual normal hill |
| 1 March | 17:00 | Women's team normal hill |
| 1 March | 20:30 | Men's individual normal hill qualification |
| 2 March | 17:00 | Men's individual normal hill |
| 5 March | 16:00 | Mixed team large hill |
| 6 March | 17:05 | Men's team large hill |
| 6 March | 20:30 | Women's individual large hill qualification |
| 7 March | 16:30 | Women's individual large hill |
| 8 March | 14:15 | Men's individual large hill qualification |
| 8 March | 15:45 | Men's individual large hill |

=== Nordic combined ===
| Date | Time | Event |
|---|---|---|
| 27 February | 15:00 / 17:00 | Women's normal hill mass start |
| 28 February | 12:00 / 16:05 | Mixed team normal hill |
| 1 March | 12:00 / 16:00 | Men's individual normal hill Compact |
| 2 March | 12:00 / 16:00 | Women's individual normal hill Gundersen |
| 7 March | 12:00 / 15:30 | Men's team large hill |
| 8 March | 09:30 / 14:30 | Men's individual large hill Gundersen |

=== Cross-country ===
| Date | Time | Event |
|---|---|---|
| 26 February | 13:30 | Women's 7.5 kilometre classic qualification |
| 26 February | 15:30 | Men's 7.5 kilometre classic qualification |
| 27 February | 10:00 | Men's & women's sprint freestyle qualification |
| 27 February | 12:30 | Men's & women's sprint freestyle finals |
| 1 March | 14:00 | Men's 20 kilometre skiathlon |
| 2 March | 14:00 | Women's 20 kilometre skiathlon |
| 4 March | 13:00 | Men's 10 kilometre classic |
| 4 March | 15:30 | Women's 10 kilometre classic |
| 5 March | 11:00 | Men's & women's team sprint classic qualification |
| 5 March | 14:30 | Men's & women's team sprint classic finals |
| 6 March | 14:30 | Men's 4 × 7.5 kilometre relay |
| 7 March | 13:15 | Women's 4 × 7.5 kilometre relay |
| 8 March | 11:30 | Men's 50 kilometre freestyle mass start |
| 9 March | 11:30 | Women's 50 kilometre freestyle mass start |

=== Para cross-country ===
| Date | Time | Event |
|---|---|---|
| 4 March | 10:00 | Men's & women's sprint classic qualification |
| 5 March | 08:45 | Men's & women's sprint classic semifinals |
| 5 March | 12:20 | Men's & women's sprint classic finals |

== Disqualifications and bans for manipulated ski-jumping suits ==
On 8 March, Johann André Forfang and Marius Lindvik were disqualified after an inspector from FIS inspected their ski jumping suits while the competition was ongoing. Earlier (7 March), media had published a video clip, that indicated that the Norwegian team were manipulating at least one ski jumping suit.

In regard to jumpsuits being manipulated after being approved: On 9 March, media said that "No one is any longer contesting what the video [from 7 March] is showing; Norway is intentionally manipulating jumpsuits that have already been approved for world championship events". Later that day, FIS said that all the Norwegian medals from the ski jumping events would be investigated. Later that day, Jan-Erik Aalbu, chief of ski jumping of the Norwegian Ski Federation, admitted that the Norwegian team had been cheating.

On 10 March, the coach of the Norwegian ski jumping team, Magnus Brevig, was suspended; he said (on 10 March), that there were three of the team's staff, who made the decision to manipulate the ski jumping suits. A tailor on the team, was also suspended. On 11 March, the assistant coach, Thomas Lobben, was suspended.

The two disqualified ski jumpers have said that they did not know anything about the manipulated suits. On 12 March, those two ski jumpers were temporarily suspended from competitions by FIS.

On 13 March, Toyota Norway pulled out of their sponsorship of the ski jumping team. Later that day three more ski jumpers got temporary suspensions from FIS: Robin Pedersen, Kristoffer Eriksen Sundal and Robert Johansson.

As of April 2025, there are no more competitions for the Norwegian jumpers this season; FIS has ended suspension of the ski jumpers mentioned above.

As of May 2025, Brevig and Lobben are no longer working for the Norwegian Ski Federation.

In 2026, FIS handed down their verdict for 3 people; 18-month bans were handed down to Magnus Brevig, Thomas Lobben and Adrian Livelten (a tailor for the team).

== Medal summary ==
=== Cross-country skiing ===
==== Men ====
| Event | Gold | | Silver | | Bronze | |
|---|---|---|---|---|---|---|
| Sprint freestyle | Johannes Høsflot Klæbo; Norway | 2:45.74 | Federico Pellegrino; Italy | 2:46.41 | Lauri Vuorinen; Finland | 2:50.53 |
| 20 km skiathlon | Johannes Høsflot Klæbo; Norway | 44:22.3 | Martin Løwstrøm Nyenget; Norway | 44:23.7 | Harald Østberg Amundsen; Norway | 44:23.7 |
| 10 km classical individual | Johannes Høsflot Klæbo; Norway | 28:16.6 | Erik Valnes; Norway | 28:25.4 | Harald Østberg Amundsen; Norway | 28:27.6 |
| Team sprint classical | Norway; Erik Valnes; Johannes Høsflot Klæbo | 18:27.71 | Finland; Ristomatti Hakola; Lauri Vuorinen | 18:31.81 | Sweden; Oskar Svensson; Edvin Anger | 18:31.82 |
| 4 × 7.5 kilometre relay | Norway; Erik Valnes; Martin Løwstrøm Nyenget; Harald Østberg Amundsen; Johannes Høsflot Klæbo | 1:08:13.7 | Switzerland; Cyril Fähndrich; Jonas Baumann; Jason Rüesch; Valerio Grond | 1:08:35.3 | Sweden; Truls Gisselman; William Poromaa; Jens Burman; Edvin Anger | 1:08:35.5 |
| 50 kilometre freestyle mass start | Johannes Høsflot Klæbo; Norway | 1:57:47.1 | William Poromaa; Sweden | 1:57:49.2 | Simen Hegstad Krüger; Norway | 1:57:55.6 |

==== Women ====
| Event | Gold | | Silver | | Bronze | |
|---|---|---|---|---|---|---|
| Sprint freestyle | Jonna Sundling; Sweden | 3:03.36 | Kristine Stavås Skistad; Norway | 3:05.49 | Nadine Fähndrich; Switzerland | 3:06.20 |
| 20 km skiathlon | Ebba Andersson; Sweden | 47:57.1 | Therese Johaug; Norway | 47:57.1 | Jonna Sundling; Sweden | 48:07.3 |
| 10 km classical individual | Ebba Andersson; Sweden | 30:19.8 | Therese Johaug; Norway | 30:21.1 | Frida Karlsson; Sweden | 30:31.9 |
| Team sprint classical | Sweden; Jonna Sundling; Maja Dahlqvist | 20:51.63 | United States; Jessie Diggins; Julia Kern | 20:54.53 | Switzerland; Anja Weber; Nadine Fähndrich | 21:00.76 |
| 4 × 7.5 kilometre relay | Sweden; Emma Ribom; Frida Karlsson; Ebba Andersson; Jonna Sundling | 1:15:41.5 | Norway; Heidi Weng; Astrid Øyre Slind; Therese Johaug; Kristin Austgulen Fosnæs | 1:15:42.2 | Germany; Pia Fink; Katharina Hennig; Helen Hoffmann; Victoria Carl | 1:16:54.9 |
| 50 kilometre freestyle mass start | Frida Karlsson; Sweden | 2:24:55.3 | Heidi Weng; Norway | 2:24:57.4 | Therese Johaug; Norway | 2:24:58.2 |

=== Nordic combined ===
==== Men ====
| Event | Gold | | Silver | | Bronze | |
|---|---|---|---|---|---|---|
| Individual normal hill/7.5 km compact | Jarl Magnus Riiber; Norway | 17:13.4 | Jens Lurås Oftebro; Norway | 17:14.2 | Vinzenz Geiger; Germany | 17:14.5 |
| Team large hill/4 × 5 km | Germany; Johannes Rydzek; Wendelin Thannheimer; Julian Schmid; Vinzenz Geiger | 50:37.7 | Austria; Johannes Lamparter; Franz-Josef Rehrl; Martin Fritz; Fabio Obermeyr | 50:44.5 | Norway; Simen Tiller; Jørgen Graabak; Jens Lurås Oftebro; Jarl Magnus Riiber | 52:17.5 |
| Individual large hill/10 km | Jarl Magnus Riiber; Norway | 24:57.5 | Jørgen Graabak; Norway | 26:08.2 | Vinzenz Geiger; Germany | 26:08.6 |

==== Women ====
| Event | Gold | | Silver | | Bronze | |
|---|---|---|---|---|---|---|
| 5 km mass start/individual normal hill | Yuna Kasai; Japan | 121.0 | Gyda Westvold Hansen; Norway | 118.7 | Haruka Kasai; Japan | 115.6 |
| Individual normal hill/5 km | Gyda Westvold Hansen; Norway | 13:42.9 | Ida Marie Hagen; Norway | 13:49.5 | Lisa Hirner; Austria | 13:50.4 |

==== Mixed ====
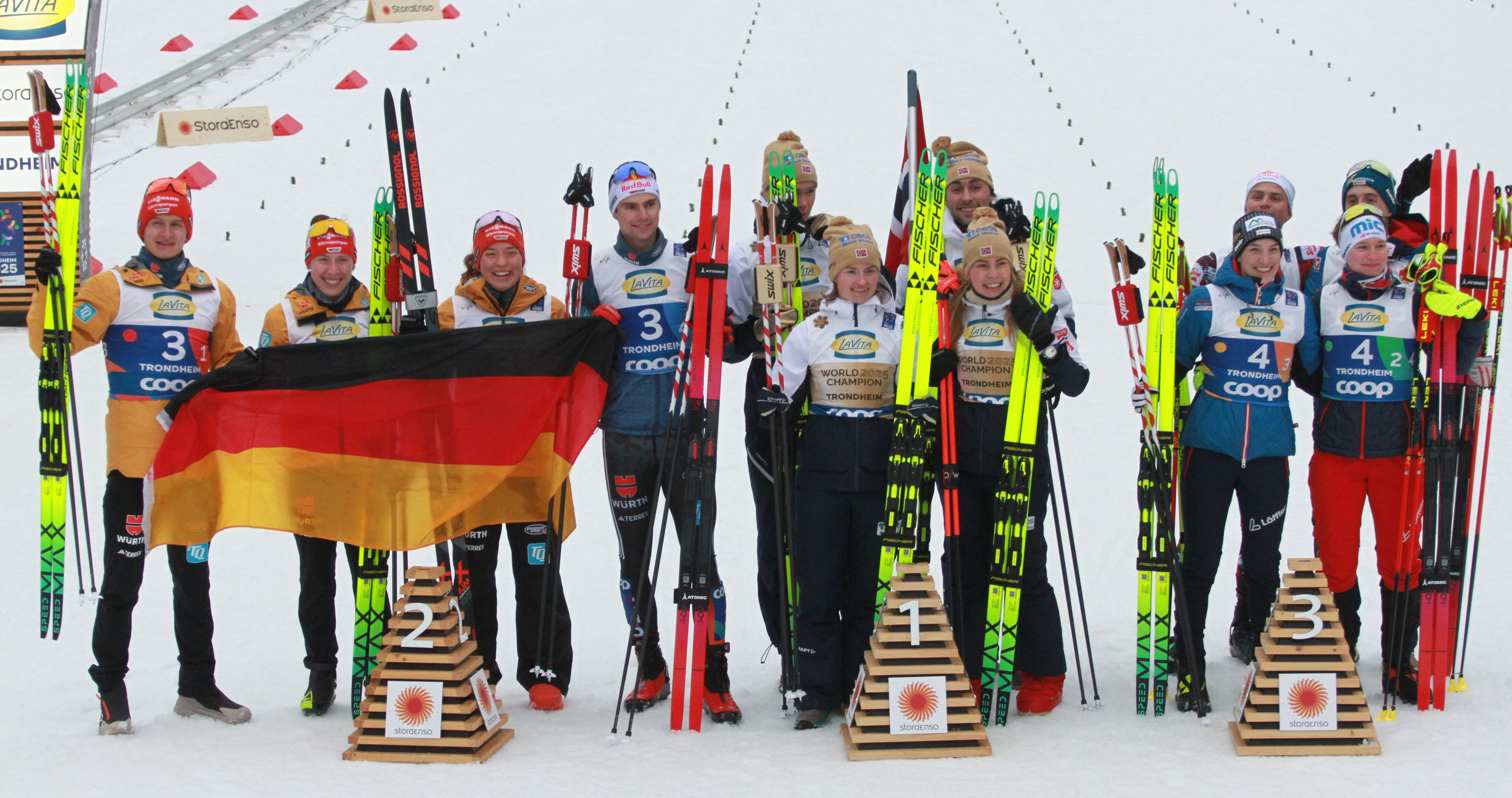
Mixed team normal hill podium

| Event | Gold | | Silver | | Bronze | |
|---|---|---|---|---|---|---|
| Mixed team normal hill | Norway; Jens Lurås Oftebro; Gyda Westvold Hansen; Ida Marie Hagen; Jarl Magnus Riiber | 36:37.5 | Germany; Julian Schmid; Jenny Nowak; Nathalie Armbruster; Vinzenz Geiger | 37:26.3 | Austria; Stefan Rettenegger; Claudia Purker; Lisa Hirner; Johannes Lamparter | 37:47.6 |

=== Ski jumping ===
==== Men ====
| Event | Gold | | Silver | | Bronze | |
|---|---|---|---|---|---|---|
| Men's individual normal hill | Marius Lindvik; Norway | 265.5 | Andreas Wellinger; Germany | 263.2 | Jan Hörl; Austria | 256.3 |
| Men's individual large hill | Domen Prevc; Slovenia | 301.8 | Jan Hörl; Austria | 286.6 | Ryōyū Kobayashi; Japan | 284.7 |
| Men's team large hill | Slovenia; Lovro Kos; Domen Prevc; Timi Zajc; Anže Lanišek | 1080.8 | Austria; Daniel Tschofenig; Maximilian Ortner; Stefan Kraft; Jan Hörl | 1067.4 | Norway; Johann André Forfang; Robin Pedersen; Kristoffer Eriksen Sundal; Marius Lindvik | 1065.3 |

==== Women ====
| Event | Gold | | Silver | | Bronze | |
|---|---|---|---|---|---|---|
| Women's individual normal hill | Nika Prevc; Slovenia | 259.2 | Selina Freitag; Germany | 250.8 | Anna Odine Strøm; Norway | 246.6 |
| Women's individual large hill | Nika Prevc; Slovenia | 150.9 | Selina Freitag; Germany | 136.7 | Eirin Maria Kvandal; Norway | 132.4 |
| Women's team normal hill | Norway; Anna Odine Strøm; Ingvild Synnøve Midtskogen; Heidi Dyhre Tråserud; Eirin Maria Kvandal | 904.5 | Austria; Lisa Eder; Julia Mühlbacher; Jacqueline Seifriedsberger; Eva Pinkelnig | 885.1 | Germany; Juliane Seyfarth; Katharina Schmid; Agnes Reisch; Selina Freitag | 846.5 |

==== Mixed ====
| Event | Gold | | Silver | | Bronze | |
|---|---|---|---|---|---|---|
| Mixed team large hill | Norway; Anna Odine Strøm; Marius Lindvik; Eirin Maria Kvandal; Johann André Forfang | 1020.4 | Slovenia; Ema Klinec; Domen Prevc; Nika Prevc; Anže Lanišek | 959.3 | Austria; Eva Pinkelnig; Stefan Kraft; Jacqueline Seifriedsberger; Jan Hörl | 906.8 |

=== Para cross-country ===
==== Men ====
| Event | Class | Gold | | Silver | | Bronze | |
|---|---|---|---|---|---|---|---|
| Sprint | Visually impaired | Zebastian Modin; Guide: Emil Jönsson; Sweden | 3:25.08 | Jake Adicoff; Guide: Peter Wolter; United States | 3:29.52 | Inkki Inola; Guide: Arttu Kaario; Finland | 3:37.10 |
| Sprint | Sitting | Cristian Ribera; Brazil | 2:25.20 | Pavlo Bal; Ukraine | 2:30.78 | Yerbol Khamitov; Kazakhstan | 2:32.45 |
| Sprint | Standing | Karl Tabouret; France | 3:46.86 | Taiki Kawayoke; Japan | 3:50.07 | Benjamin Daviet; France | 3:53.77 |

==== Women ====
| Event | Class | Gold | | Silver | | Bronze | |
|---|---|---|---|---|---|---|---|
| Sprint | Visually impaired | Carina Edlinger; Guide: Jakob Kainz; Austria | 3:58.16 | Simona Bubeníčková; Guide: David Šrůtek; Czech Republic | 4:02.09 | Leonie Walter; Guide: Christian Krasman; Germany | 4:10.52 |
| Sprint | Sitting | Kim Yun-ji; South Korea | 3:04.35 | Kendall Gretsch; United States | 3:07.34 | Anja Wicker; Germany | 3:09.75 |
| Sprint | Standing | Vilde Nilsen; Norway | 3:52.92 | Natalie Wilkie; Canada | 3:53.13 | Sydney Peterson; United States | 4:07.39 |

== Medal tables ==
=== Overall ===
* Host nation (Norway)

| Rank | Nation | Gold | Silver | Bronze | Total |
|---|---|---|---|---|---|
| 1 | Norway* | 14 | 11 | 8 | 33 |
| 2 | Sweden | 7 | 1 | 4 | 12 |
| 3 | Slovenia | 4 | 1 | 0 | 5 |
| 4 | Germany | 1 | 4 | 6 | 11 |
| 5 | Austria | 1 | 4 | 4 | 9 |
| 6 | Japan | 1 | 1 | 2 | 4 |
| 7 | France | 1 | 0 | 1 | 2 |
| 8 | Brazil | 1 | 0 | 0 | 1 |
| 8 | South Korea | 1 | 0 | 0 | 1 |
| 10 | United States | 0 | 3 | 1 | 4 |
| 11 | Finland | 0 | 1 | 2 | 3 |
| 11 | Switzerland | 0 | 1 | 2 | 3 |
| 13 | Canada | 0 | 1 | 0 | 1 |
| 13 | Czech Republic | 0 | 1 | 0 | 1 |
| 13 | Italy | 0 | 1 | 0 | 1 |
| 13 | Ukraine | 0 | 1 | 0 | 1 |
| 17 | Kazakhstan | 0 | 0 | 1 | 1 |
| Totals (17 entries) | | 31 | 31 | 31 | 93 |

=== Cross-country ===
| Rank | Nation | Gold | Silver | Bronze | Total |
|---|---|---|---|---|---|
| 1 | Norway* | 6 | 7 | 4 | 17 |
| 2 | Sweden | 6 | 1 | 4 | 11 |
| 3 | Switzerland | 0 | 1 | 2 | 3 |
| 4 | Finland | 0 | 1 | 1 | 2 |
| 5 | Italy | 0 | 1 | 0 | 1 |
| 5 | United States | 0 | 1 | 0 | 1 |
| 7 | Germany | 0 | 0 | 1 | 1 |
| Totals (7 entries) | | 12 | 12 | 12 | 36 |

=== Nordic combined ===
| Rank | Nation | Gold | Silver | Bronze | Total |
|---|---|---|---|---|---|
| 1 | Norway* | 4 | 4 | 1 | 9 |
| 2 | Germany | 1 | 1 | 2 | 4 |
| 3 | Japan | 1 | 0 | 1 | 2 |
| 4 | Austria | 0 | 1 | 2 | 3 |
| Totals (4 entries) | | 6 | 6 | 6 | 18 |

=== Ski jumping ===
| Rank | Nation | Gold | Silver | Bronze | Total |
|---|---|---|---|---|---|
| 1 | Slovenia | 4 | 1 | 0 | 5 |
| 2 | Norway* | 3 | 0 | 3 | 6 |
| 3 | Austria | 0 | 3 | 2 | 5 |
| 4 | Germany | 0 | 3 | 1 | 4 |
| 5 | Japan | 0 | 0 | 1 | 1 |
| Totals (5 entries) | | 7 | 7 | 7 | 21 |

=== Para cross-country ===
| Rank | Nation | Gold | Silver | Bronze | Total |
|---|---|---|---|---|---|
| 1 | France | 1 | 0 | 1 | 2 |
| 2 | Austria | 1 | 0 | 0 | 1 |
| 2 | Brazil | 1 | 0 | 0 | 1 |
| 2 | Norway* | 1 | 0 | 0 | 1 |
| 2 | South Korea | 1 | 0 | 0 | 1 |
| 2 | Sweden | 1 | 0 | 0 | 1 |
| 7 | United States | 0 | 2 | 1 | 3 |
| 8 | Canada | 0 | 1 | 0 | 1 |
| 8 | Czech Republic | 0 | 1 | 0 | 1 |
| 8 | Japan | 0 | 1 | 0 | 1 |
| 8 | Ukraine | 0 | 1 | 0 | 1 |
| 12 | Germany | 0 | 0 | 2 | 2 |
| 13 | Finland | 0 | 0 | 1 | 1 |
| 13 | Kazakhstan | 0 | 0 | 1 | 1 |
| Totals (14 entries) | | 6 | 6 | 6 | 18 |

== Multiple medalists ==
| Name | Country | Event | 1st place, gold medalist(s) | 2nd place, silver medalist(s) | 3rd place, bronze medalist(s) | Total |
| Johannes Høsflot Klæbo | Norway | Cross-country | 6 | 0 | 0 | 6 |
| Jarl Magnus Riiber | Norway | Nordic combined | 3 | 0 | 1 | 4 |
| Jonna Sundling | Sweden | Cross-country | 3 | 0 | 1 | 4 |
| Ebba Andersson | Sweden | Cross-country | 3 | 0 | 0 | 3 |
| Gyda Westvold Hansen | Norway | Nordic combined | 2 | 1 | 0 | 3 |
| Domen Prevc | Slovenia | Ski jumping | 2 | 1 | 0 | 3 |
| Nika Prevc | Slovenia | Ski jumping | 2 | 1 | 0 | 3 |
| Erik Valnes | Norway | Cross-country | 2 | 1 | 0 | 3 |
| Frida Karlsson | Sweden | Cross-country | 2 | 0 | 1 | 3 |
| Eirin Maria Kvandal | Norway | Ski jumping | 2 | 0 | 1 | 3 |
| Marius Lindvik | Norway | Ski jumping | 2 | 0 | 1 | 3 |
| Anna Odine Strøm | Norway | Ski jumping | 2 | 0 | 1 | 3 |
| Vinzenz Geiger | Germany | Nordic combined | 1 | 1 | 2 | 4 |
| Jens Lurås Oftebro | Norway | Nordic combined | 1 | 1 | 1 | 3 |
| Ida Marie Hagen | Norway | Nordic combined | 1 | 1 | 0 | 2 |
| Anže Lanišek | Slovenia | Ski jumping | 1 | 1 | 0 | 2 |
| Martin Løwstrøm Nyenget | Norway | Cross-country | 1 | 1 | 0 | 2 |
| Julian Schmid | Germany | Nordic combined | 1 | 1 | 0 | 2 |
| Harald Østberg Amundsen | Norway | Cross-country | 1 | 0 | 2 | 3 |
| Johann André Forfang | Norway | Ski jumping | 1 | 0 | 1 | 2 |
| Therese Johaug | Norway | Cross-country | 0 | 3 | 1 | 4 |
| Jan Hörl | Austria | Ski jumping | 0 | 2 | 2 | 4 |
| Selina Freitag | Germany | Ski jumping | 0 | 2 | 1 | 3 |
| Heidi Weng | Norway | Cross-country | 0 | 2 | 0 | 2 |
| Jørgen Graabak | Norway | Nordic combined | 0 | 1 | 1 | 2 |
| Stefan Kraft | Austria | Ski jumping | 0 | 1 | 1 | 2 |
| Johannes Lamparter | Austria | Nordic combined | 0 | 1 | 1 | 2 |
| Eva Pinkelnig | Austria | Ski jumping | 0 | 1 | 1 | 2 |
| William Poromaa | Sweden | Cross-country | 0 | 1 | 1 | 2 |
| Jacqueline Seifriedsberger | Austria | Ski jumping | 0 | 1 | 1 | 2 |
| Lauri Vuorinen | Finland | Cross-country | 0 | 1 | 1 | 2 |
| Edvin Anger | Sweden | Cross-country | 0 | 0 | 2 | 2 |
| Nadine Fähndrich | Switzerland | Cross-country | 0 | 0 | 2 | 2 |
| Lisa Hirner | Austria | Nordic combined | 0 | 0 | 2 | 2 |
