= Jens Lurås Oftebro =

Norwegian Nordic combined skier (born 2000)

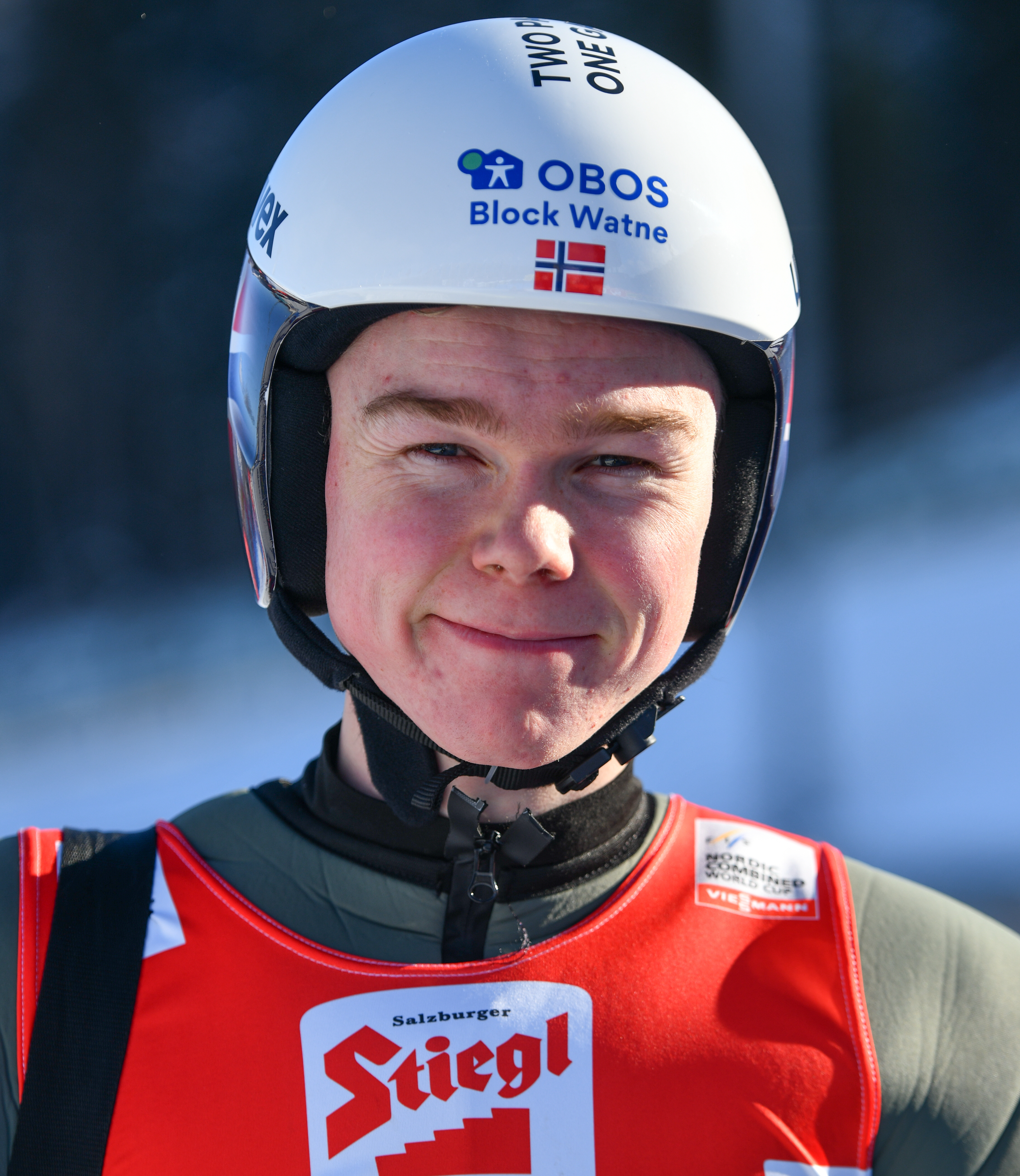
- Oftebro in 2023

Personal information
- Full name: Jens Christian Lurås Oftebro
- Nationality: Norway
- Born: 21 July 2000 (age 26) Oslo, Norway

Sport
- Sport: Skiing
- Club: IL Jardar

World Cup career
- Seasons: 2018–present
- Indiv. starts: 135
- Indiv. podiums: 41
- Indiv. wins: 11
- Discipline titles: 3 – (3 BST: 2023, 2025, 2026)
Medal record
Men's Nordic combined
Representing Norway
Olympic Games
Gold medal – first place	2022 Beijing	Team LH
Gold medal – first place	2026 Milano Cortina	Individual NH
Gold medal – first place	2026 Milano Cortina	Individual LH
Gold medal – first place	2026 Milano Cortina	Team LH
Silver medal – second place	2022 Beijing	Individual LH
World Championships
Gold medal – first place	2021 Oberstdorf	Team NH
Gold medal – first place	2023 Planica	Team LH
Gold medal – first place	2023 Planica	Mixed team NH
Gold medal – first place	2025 Trondheim	Mixed team NH
Silver medal – second place	2023 Planica	Individual LH
Silver medal – second place	2025 Trondheim	Individual NH
Bronze medal – third place	2021 Oberstdorf	Individual NH
Bronze medal – third place	2025 Trondheim	Team LH
World Junior Championships
Gold medal – first place	2020 Oberwiesenthal	Individual NH
Silver medal – second place	2019 Lahti	Team NH
Bronze medal – third place	2019 Lahti	Individual NH
Bronze medal – third place	2018 Kandersteg	Team NH
- Updated on 15 March 2026

Jens Christian Lurås Oftebro (born 21 July 2000) is a Norwegian Nordic combined skier. At the 2026 Winter Olympics, he won gold medals in all three Nordic combined events, becoming the second athlete after Samppa Lajunen in 2002 to achieve this.

== Career ==
At the 2017 Junior World Championships, Oftebro competed in three events, recording an individual 17th place and a team competition 6th place. At the 2018 Junior World Championships he took a 10th place in the 5 kilometres event and won a bronze medal in the relay.

Oftebro made his Continental Cup debut in January 2017 in Høydalsmo and recorded his first podium in January 2018 in Rena. He made his World Cup debut in March 2018 in Holmenkollen, at the same time finishing among the top 30 for the first time with a 27th place. On 29 November 2019 he reached his first World Cup podium, finishing third in Ruka. Exactly one year later, also in Ruka, he won his first World Cup race.

Oftebro represents the sports club IL Jardar. He is a younger brother of Einar Lurås Oftebro.

== Nordic combined results ==
- All results are sourced from FIS.

=== Olympic Games ===
- 5 medals – (4 gold, 1 silver)

Year	Individual NH	Individual LH	Team LH
2022	10	Silver	Gold
2026	Gold	Gold	Gold

=== World Championships ===
- 8 medals – (4 gold, 2 silver, 2 bronze)

Year	Individual NH	Individual LH	Team NH/LH	Team Sprint LH	Mixed Team NH
2021	Bronze	7th	Gold	—	—N/a
2023	16	Silver	Gold	—N/a	Gold
2025	Silver	4	Bronze	—N/a	Gold

=== World Cup ===
==== Season titles ====
- 3 titles – (3 BST)

Season	Discipline
2023	Best Skier Trophy
2025	Best Skier Trophy
2026	Best Skier Trophy

==== Season standings ====
Season	Age	Overall	Best Jumper Trophy	Best Skier Trophy	Compact Trophy	Mass Start Trophy
2018	17	63	57	64	—N/a	—N/a
2019	18	40	31	59	—N/a	—N/a
2020	19	4	2nd place, silver medalist(s)	22	—N/a	—N/a
2021	20	8	13	8	—N/a	—N/a
2022	21	6	13	8	—N/a	—N/a
2023	22	2nd place, silver medalist(s)	6	1st place, gold medalist(s)	—N/a	—N/a
2024	23	6	18	2nd place, silver medalist(s)	5	—N/a
2025	24	6	16	1st place, gold medalist(s)	6	5
2026	25	2nd place, silver medalist(s)	15	1st place, gold medalist(s)	2nd place, silver medalist(s)	5

==== Individual podiums ====
- 11 wins
- 41 podiums

No.	Season	Date	Location	Discipline	Place
1	2019–20	29 November 2019	(Finland) Ruka	HS142/5 km	3rd (1)
2	2019–20	30 November 2019	(Finland) Ruka	HS142/10 km	3rd (2)
3	2019–20	1 December 2019	(Finland) Ruka	HS142/10 km	3rd (3)
4	2019–20	26 January 2020	(Germany) Oberstdorf	HS137/10 km	2nd (1)
5	2019–20	23 February 2020	(Norway) Trondheim	HS138/10 km	2nd (2)
6	2020–21	27 November 2020	(Finland) Ruka	HS142/5 km	3rd (4)
7	2020–21	29 November 2020	(Finland) Ruka	HS142/10 km	1st (1)
8	2021–22	26 November 2021	(Finland) Ruka	HS142/5 km	3rd (5)
9	2021–22	28 November 2021	(Finland) Ruka	HS142/10 km	3rd (6)
10	2021–22	5 March 2022	(Norway) Oslo	HS134/10 km	3rd (7)
11	2021–22	6 March 2022	(Norway) Oslo	HS134/10 km	3rd (8)
12	2022–23	25 November 2022	(Finland) Ruka	HS142/5 km	3rd (9)
13	2022–23	26 November 2022	(Finland) Ruka	HS142/10 km	3rd (10)
14	2022–23	3 December 2022	(Norway) Lillehammer	HS100/10 km	1st (2)
15	2022–23	4 December 2022	(Norway) Lillehammer	HS140/10 km	2nd (3)
16	2022–23	16 December 2022	(Austria) Ramsau	HS98/10 km	2nd (4)
17	2022–23	27 January 2023	(Austria) Seefeld	HS109/7.5 km	1st (3)
18	2022–23	29 January 2023	(Austria) Seefeld	HS109/12.5 km	3rd (11)
19	2022–23	4 February 2023	(Germany) Oberstdorf	HS137/10 km	2nd (5)
20	2022–23	5 February 2023	(Germany) Oberstdorf	HS137/10 km	2nd (6)
21	2022–23	11 February 2023	(Germany) Schonach	HS100/10 km	1st (4)
22	2022–23	12 February 2023	(Germany) Schonach	HS100/10 km	2nd (7)
23	2022–23	25 March 2023	(Finland) Lahti	HS130/10 km	3rd (12)
24	2022–23	26 March 2023	(Finland) Lahti	HS130/10 km	2nd (8)
25	2023–24	24 November 2023	(Finland) Ruka	COM HS142/7.5 km	1st (5)
26	2023–24	2 December 2023	(Norway) Lillehammer	HS98/10 km	2nd (9)
27	2023–24	3 February 2024	(Austria) Seefeld	HS109/10 km	3rd (13)
28	2024–25	20 December 2024	(Austria) Ramsau	10 km/HS98	2nd (10)
29	2024–25	18 January 2025	(Germany) Schonach	HS100/10 km	1st (6)
30	2024–25	31 January 2025	(Austria) Seefeld	10 km/HS109	3rd (14)
31	2024–25	1 February 2025	(Austria) Seefeld	COM HS109/7.5 km	1st (7)
32	2024–25	2 February 2025	(Austria) Seefeld	HS109/12.5 km	3rd (15)
33	2024–25	8 February 2025	(Estonia) Otepää	HS97/10 km	3rd (16)
34	2025–26	19 December 2025	(Austria) Ramsau	10 km/HS98	2nd (11)
35	2025–26	20 December 2025	(Austria) Ramsau	HS98/10 km	2nd (12)
36	2025–26	17 January 2026	(Germany) Oberhof	COM HS100/7.5 km	1st (8)
37	2025–26	18 January 2026	(Germany) Oberhof	HS100/10 km	1st (9)
38	2025–26	31 January 2026	(Austria) Seefeld	COM HS109/7.5 km	3rd (17)
39	2025–26	1 February 2026	(Austria) Seefeld	HS109/12.5 km	1st (10)
40	2025–26	6 March 2026	(Finland) Lahti	HS130/10 km	1st (11)
41	2025–26	15 March 2026	(Norway) Oslo	HS134/10 km	2nd (13)
