= Espen Bjørnstad =

Norwegian Nordic combined skier

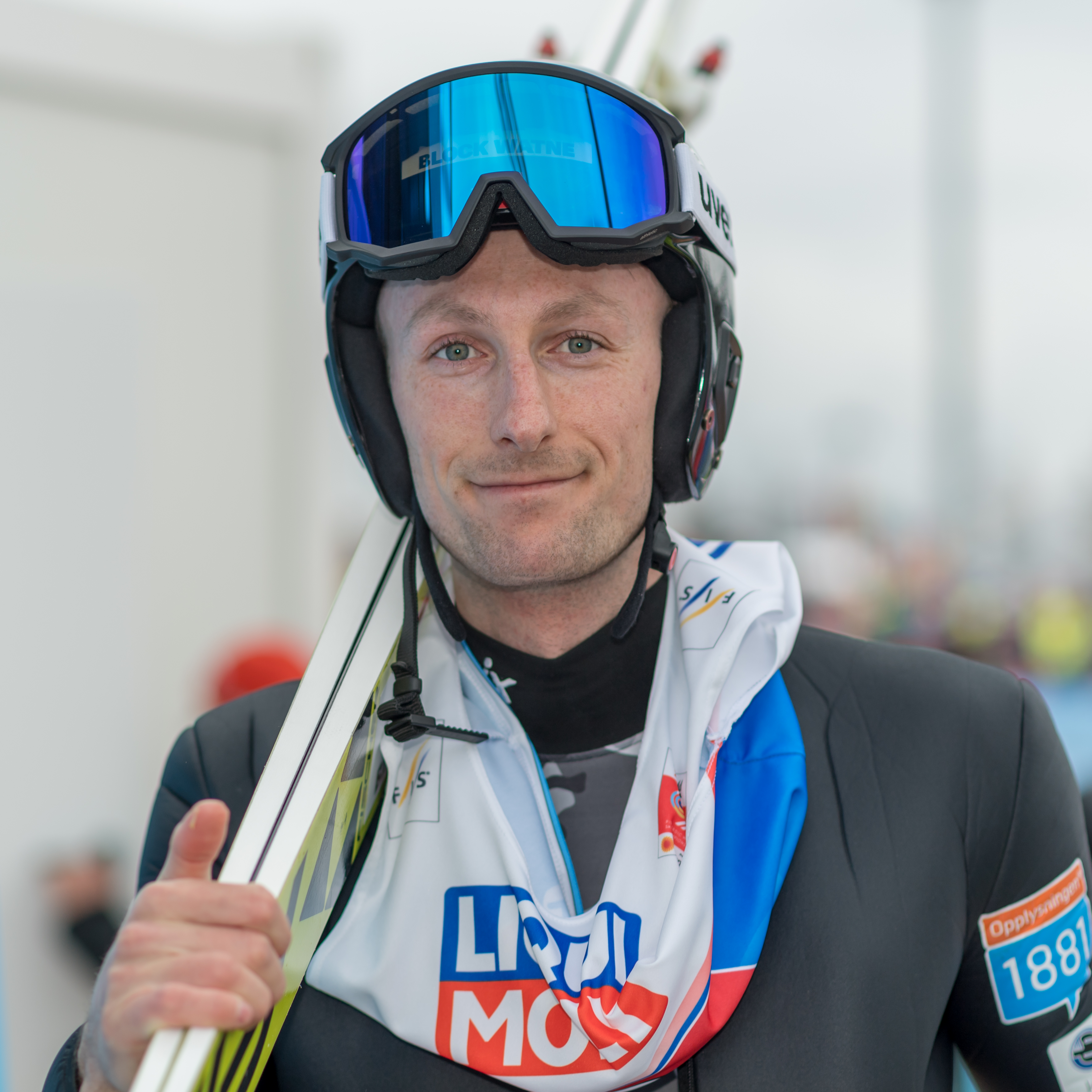
- Bjørnstad in 2019

Personal information
- Full name: Espen Dahlhaug Bjørnstad
- Nationality: Norway
- Born: 26 December 1993 (age 32) Trondheim, Norway

Sport
- Sport: Skiing
- Club: Byåsen Skiklubb

World Cup career
- Seasons: 2014–2025
- Indiv. starts: 129
- Indiv. podiums: 6
- Indiv. wins: 0
Medal record
Men's Nordic combined
Representing Norway
Olympic Games
Gold medal – first place	2022 Beijing	Team LH
World Championships
Gold medal – first place	2019 Seefeld	Team NH
Gold medal – first place	2021 Oberstdorf	Team NH

Espen Dahlhaug Bjørnstad (born 26 December 1993) is a retired Norwegian Nordic combined skier.

At the 2013 Junior World Championships he competed in three events, recording an individual 8th place and a team competition 6th place. He made his Continental Cup debut in 2013 and recorded his first podium in January 2017 in Otepää. He made his World Cup debut in January 2014 in Chaykovsky, then did not compete in 2014–15 or 2015–16. He finished among the top 30 for the first time in February 2017 with a 29th place in Pyeongchang.

He achieved his first podium in the 2018/19 World Cup season. In Chaux-Neuve, he took second place in the first day of the Nordic Combined Triple, as well as in Lahti in the team sprint together with Jørgen Graabak. In Oslo, he took third place in the individual competition.

At the World Championships in Seefeld in 2019 he won the title with the Norwegian team.

At the 2022 Winter Olympics in Beijing, he was part of the Norwegian team that won gold in the team competition.

He represented the sports club Byåsen SK.
