= Martin Fritz =

Austrian cross-country skier (born 1994)

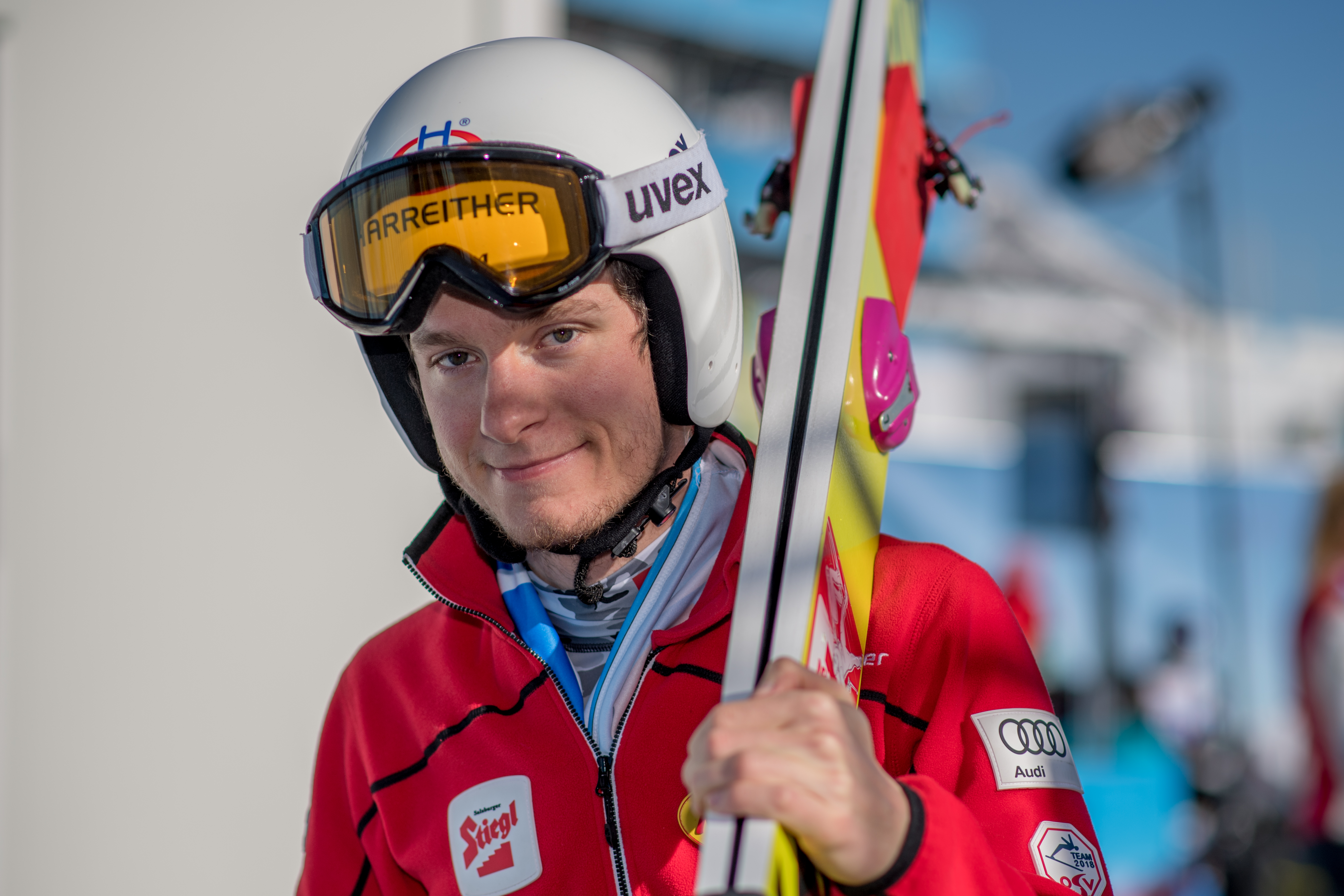
- Fritz in 2019

Personal information
- Nationality: Austria
- Born: 24 October 1994 (age 31) Murau, Austria

Sport
- Sport: Skiing
- Club: WSV Murau-Steiermark

World Cup career
- Seasons: 11 – (2014–present)
- Indiv. starts: 143
- Indiv. podiums: 1
- Indiv. wins: 0
- Team podiums: 0
- Overall titles: 0 – (12th in 2020)
- Discipline titles: 0
Medal record
Men's Nordic combined
Representing Austria
World Championships
Silver medal – second place	2025 Trondheim	Team LH
Bronze medal – third place	2023 Planica	Team LH
- Updated on 11 February 2024

Martin Fritz (born 24 October 1994) is an Austrian Nordic combined skier. He won a bronze medal in the Team LH event at the FIS Nordic World Ski Championships 2023 and competed in the individual normal hill and team LH events at the 2022 Winter Olympics.
