= 2020–21 FIS Nordic Combined Continental Cup =

International skiing competition

Nordic Combined Continental Cup 2020/21
Discipline	Men	Women
Overall	(Norway) Simen Tiller	(Austria) Sigrun Kleinrath

Competition
Locations	5	2
Individual	14	6
Cancelled	1	2

The 2020/21 FIS Nordic Combined Continental Cup was the 37th Continental Cup season, organized by the International Ski Federation. It started on 11 December 2020 in Park City, United States, and concluded on 17 March 2021 in Nizhny Tagil, Russia.

== Calendar ==
=== Men ===
Num	Date	Place	Location	Discipline	Winner	Second	Third
1	11 December 2020	(United States) Park City	Olympic Park	HS100 / 10 km	(Germany) Jakob Lange	(Germany) Simon Hüttel	(Germany) Wendelin Thannheimer
2	13 December 2020	(United States) Park City	Olympic Park	HS100 / 10 km Mass Start	(Germany) Julian Schmid	(Germany) Jakob Lange	(United States) Niklas Malacinski
3	13 December 2020	(United States) Park City	Olympic Park	HS100 / 10 km	(Germany) Julian Schmid	(Germany) Jakob Lange	(Germany) David Mach
4	15 January 2021	(Germany) Klingenthal	Vogtland Arena	HS140 / 5 km	(Norway) Simen Tiller	(Norway) Espen Andersen	(Austria) Philipp Orter
5	16 January 2021	(Germany) Klingenthal	Vogtland Arena	HS140 / 10 km	(Austria) Manuel Einkemmer	(Norway) Simen Tiller	(Austria) Philipp Orter
6	17 January 2021	(Germany) Klingenthal	Vogtland Arena	HS140 / 10 km	(Norway) Simen Tiller	(Norway) Espen Andersen	(Germany) Jakob Lange
7	22 January 2021	(Austria) Eisenerz	Erzberg Arena	HS109 / 10 km	(Austria) Stefan Rettenegger	(Norway) Espen Andersen	(Austria) Philipp Orter
	23 January 2021	(Austria) Eisenerz	Erzberg Arena	HS109 / 10 km Mixed Team	cancelled, replaced with a HS109 / 10 km event on the same date		
8	23 January 2021	(Austria) Eisenerz	Erzberg Arena	HS109 / 10 km	(Norway) Espen Andersen	(Austria) Stefan Rettenegger	(Austria) Philipp Orter
9	24 January 2021	(Austria) Eisenerz	Erzberg Arena	HS109 / 10 km	(Norway) Leif Torbjørn Næsvold	(Norway) Simen Tiller	(Austria) Philipp Orter
10	6 February 2021	(Finland) Lahti	Salpausselkä	HS100 / 10 km	(Norway) Andreas Skoglund	(Norway) Lars Buraas	(Finland) Willie Karhumaa
11	7 February 2021	(Finland) Lahti	Salpausselkä	HS100 / 10 km	(Norway) Lars Buraas	(Norway) Kasper Moen Flatla	(United States) Jared Shumate
	12 March 2021	(Norway) Rena	Renabakkene	HS111 / 10 km	cancelled; moved to Nizhny Tagil		
	13 March 2021	(Norway) Rena	Renabakkene	HS111 / 10 km Mass Start	cancelled; moved to Nizhny Tagil		
	14 March 2021	(Norway) Rena	Renabakkene	HS111 / 10 km	cancelled; moved to Nizhny Tagil		
12	12 March 2021	(Russia) Nizhniy Tagil	Tramplin Stork	HS97 / 5 km	(Germany) Terence Weber	(Norway) Lars Ivar Skårset	(Norway) Simen Tiller
13	13 March 2021	(Russia) Nizhniy Tagil	Tramplin Stork	HS97 / 10 km Mass Start	(Germany) Terence Weber	(Norway) Lars Ivar Skårset	(Germany) David Mach
14	14 March 2021	(Russia) Nizhniy Tagil	Tramplin Stork	HS97 / 15 km	(Germany) Terence Weber	(Norway) Simen Tiller	(Germany) Julian Schmid

=== Women ===
Num	Date	Place	Location	Discipline	Winner	Second	Third
	11 December 2020	(United States) Park City	Olympic Park	HS100 / 5 km	cancelled		
	12 December 2020	(United States) Park City	Olympic Park	HS100 / 5 km	cancelled		
	13 December 2020	(United States) Park City	Olympic Park	HS100 / 5 km	cancelled		
1	22 January 2021	(Austria) Eisenerz	Erzberg Arena	HS109 / 5 km	(Norway) Gyda Westvold Hansen	(Japan) Anju Nakamura	(Japan) Ayane Miyazaki
	23 January 2021	(Austria) Eisenerz	Erzberg Arena	HS109 / 5 km Mixed Team	cancelled, replaced with a HS109 / 5 km event on the same date		
2	23 January 2021	(Austria) Eisenerz	Erzberg Arena	HS109 / 5 km	(Norway) Gyda Westvold Hansen	(Japan) Anju Nakamura	(Austria) Lisa Hirner
3	24 January 2021	(Austria) Eisenerz	Erzberg Arena	HS109 / 5 km	(Norway) Gyda Westvold Hansen	(Austria) Lisa Hirner	(Norway) Mari Leinan Lund
	12 March 2021	(Norway) Rena	Renabakkene	HS111 / 5 km	cancelled; moved to Nizhny Tagil		
	13 March 2021	(Norway) Rena	Renabakkene	HS111 / 5 km Mass Start	cancelled; moved to Nizhny Tagil		
	14 March 2021	(Norway) Rena	Renabakkene	HS111 / 5 km	cancelled; moved to Nizhny Tagil		
4	12 March 2021	(Russia) Nizhniy Tagil	Tramplin Stork	HS97 / 5 km	(United States) Tara Geraghty-Moats	(Austria) Sigrun Kleinrath	(Germany) Maria Gerboth
5	13 March 2021	(Russia) Nizhniy Tagil	Tramplin Stork	HS97 / 5 km Mass Start	(United States) Tara Geraghty-Moats	(Russia) Stefaniya Nadymova	(Germany) Maria Gerboth
6	14 March 2021	(Russia) Nizhniy Tagil	Tramplin Stork	HS97 / 5 km	(United States) Tara Geraghty-Moats	(Austria) Sigrun Kleinrath	(Austria) Annalena Slamik

== Standings ==
=== Men's Overall ===
Rank	after all 14 events	Points
1	(Norway) Simen Tiller	629
2	(Norway) Lars Ivar Skårset	452
3	(Germany) David Mach	447
4	(Norway) Espen Andersen	440
5	(Austria) Manuel Einkemmer	424
6	(Germany) Jakob Lange	411
7	(Germany) Julian Schmid	372
8	(Austria) Philipp Orter	345
9	(Germany) Wendelin Thannheimer	314
10	(Norway) Lars Buraas	302

=== Women's Overall ===
Rank	after all 6 events	Points
1	(Austria) Sigrun Kleinrath	320
2	(Norway) Gyda Westvold Hansen	300
2	(United States) Tara Geraghty-Moats	300
4	(Austria) Lisa Hirner	243
5	(Russia) Stefaniya Nadymova	228
6	(Austria) Annalena Slamik	182
7	(Germany) Maria Gerboth	180
8	(Japan) Anju Nakamura	160
9	(Germany) Cyndi Haasch	158
10	(Norway) Mari Leinan Lund	155
