= 2021–22 FIS Nordic Combined Continental Cup =

International skiing competition

Nordic Combined Continental Cup 2021/22
Discipline	Men	Women
Overall	(Germany) Jakob Lange	(Norway) Gyda Westvold Hansen

Competition
Locations	9	2
Individual	14	6
Cancelled	3	7

The 2021/22 FIS Nordic Combined Continental Cup was the 38th Continental Cup season, organized by the International Ski Federation. It started on 25 November 2021 in Nizhniy Tagil, Russia, and concluded on 27 March 2021 in Lake Placid, United States.

On 1 March 2022, following the 2022 Russian invasion of Ukraine, FIS decided to exclude athletes from Russia and Belarus from FIS competitions, with an immediate effect.

== Calendar ==
=== Men ===
Num	Date	Place	Location	Discipline	Winner	Second	Third
1	26 November 2021	(Russia) Nizhniy Tagil	Long Mountain	HS97 / 10 km	(Germany) Jakob Lange	(Germany) David Mach	(Austria) Philipp Orter
2	27 November 2021	(Russia) Nizhniy Tagil	Long Mountain	HS97 / 10 km	(Germany) Jakob Lange	(Germany) David Mach	(Austria) Christian Deuschl
3	4 December 2021	(China) Zhangjiakou	Kuyangshu Ski Jumping	HS140 / 10 km	(Germany) Jakob Lange	(Germany) David Mach	(Austria) Thomas Rettenegger
4	5 December 2021	(China) Zhangjiakou	Kuyangshu Ski Jumping	HS140 / 10 km	(Germany) Jakob Lange	(Japan) Sakutaro Kobayashi	(Japan) Yuya Yamamoto
5	18 December 2021	(Finland) Ruka	Rukatunturi	HS142 / 10 km Mass Start	(Norway) Andreas Skoglund	(Norway) Einar Lurås Oftebro	(Finland) Leevi Mutru
6	19 December 2021	(Finland) Ruka	Rukatunturi	HS142 / 10 km	(Norway) Einar Lurås Oftebro	(Norway) Sebastian Østvold	(Norway) Andreas Skoglund
7	21 January 2022	(Germany) Klingenthal	Vogtland Arena	HS140 / 5 km	(Norway) Simen Tiller	(Norway) Andreas Skoglund	(United States) Ben Loomis
8	22 January 2022	(Germany) Klingenthal	Vogtland Arena	HS140 / 10 km	(Norway) Simen Tiller	(Norway) Andreas Skoglund	(Germany) Jakob Lange
9	23 January 2022	(Germany) Klingenthal	Vogtland Arena	HS140 / 10 km	(Norway) Simen Tiller	(Norway) Lars Burås	(Austria) Thomas Jöbstl
	11 February 2022	(Norway) Rena	Renabakkene	HS109 / 10 km	Cancelled, moved to Lillehammer.		
	12 February 2022	(Norway) Rena	Renabakkene	HS109 / 2x1,5 km Team Sprint	Cancelled, moved to Lillehammer.		
	13 February 2022	(Norway) Rena	Renabakkene	HS109 / 10 km	Cancelled, moved to Lillehammer.		
10	11 February 2022	(Norway) Lillehammer	Lysgårdsbakken	HS98 / 10 km	(Norway) Andreas Skoglund	(Norway) Einar Lurås Oftebro	(Germany) Jakob Lange
11	12 February 2022	(Norway) Lillehammer	Lysgårdsbakken	HS98 / 2x1,5 km Team Sprint	Austria I Philipp Orter; Lukas Klapfer	Austria III Manuel Enkemeer; Marc Luis Rainer	Norway II Andreas Skoglund; Kasper Moen Flatla
12	13 February 2022	(Norway) Lillehammer	Lysgårdsbakken	HS98 / 10 km	(Norway) Lars Ivar Skårset	(Austria) Lukas Klapfer	(Austria) Thomas Rettenegger
13	18 February 2022	(Austria) Eisenerz	Erzberg Arena	HS109 / 10 km	(Austria) Lukas Klapfer	(Austria) Thomas Rettenegger	(Norway) Lars Burås
14	19 February 2022	(Austria) Eisenerz	Erzberg Arena	HS109 / 10 km Mixed Team	Norway Lars Ivar Skårset; Ida Marie Hagen; Gyda Westvold Hansen; Lars Burås	Austria Thomas Rettenegger; Lisa Hirner; Annalena Slamik; Lukas Klapfer	Germany David Mach; Cindy Haasch; Sophia Maurus; Wendelin Thannheimer
15	20 February 2022	(Austria) Eisenerz	Erzberg Arena	HS109 / 10 km	(Austria) Stefan Rettenegger	(Norway) Lars Burås	(Norway) Lars Ivar Skårset
16	5 March 2021	(Finland) Lahti	Salpausselkä	HS130 / 10 km	(Germany) Jakob Lange	(Austria) Manuel Enkemmer	(Germany) David Mach
17	6 March 2021	(Finland) Lahti	Salpausselkä	HS130 / 10 km	(Germany) Jakob Lange	(Germany) Wendelin Thannheimer	(Germany) Martin Hahn
18	17 March 2022	(Canada) Whistler	Whistler Olympic Park	HS105 / 10 km	(Germany) David Mach	(Austria) Marc Luis Rainer	(Germany) Jakob Lange
19	18 March 2022	(Canada) Whistler	Whistler Olympic Park	HS105 / 10 km	(Germany) Jakob Lange	(Germany) David Mach	(Germany) Wendelin Thannheimer
20	25 March 2022	(United States) Lake Placid	Olympic Center	HS100 / 10 km	(Germany) Jakob Lange	(Germany) Wendelin Thannheimer	(United States) Stephen Schumann
21	26 March 2022	(United States) Lake Placid	Olympic Center	HS100 / 10 km	(Germany) Jakob Lange	(Germany) Wendelin Thannheimer	(Germany) David Mach

=== Women ===
Num	Date	Place	Location	Discipline	Winner	Second	Third
	11 February 2022	(Norway) Rena	Renabakkene	HS109 / 5 km	Cancelled, moved to Lillehammer.		
	12 February 2022	(Norway) Rena	Renabakkene	HS109 / 2x1,5 km Team Sprint	Cancelled, moved to Lillehammer.		
	13 February 2022	(Norway) Rena	Renabakkene	HS109 / 5 km	Cancelled, moved to Lillehammer.		
1	11 February 2022	(Norway) Lillehammer	Lysgårdsbakken	HS98 / 5 km	(Norway) Gyda Westvold Hansen	(Italy) Annika Sieff	(Austria) Lisa Hirner
2	12 February 2022	(Norway) Lillehammer	Lysgårdsbakken	HS98 / 2x1,5 km Team Sprint	Norway I Marte Leinan Lund; Gyda Westvold Hansen	Austria I Annalena Slamik; Lisa Hirner	Germany II Marie Nähring; Maria Gerboth
3	13 February 2022	(Norway) Lillehammer	Lysgårdsbakken	HS98 / 5 km	(Norway) Gyda Westvold Hansen	(Austria) Lisa Hirner	(Italy) Annika Sieff
4	18 February 2022	(Austria) Eisenerz	Erzberg Arena	HS109 / 5 km	(Norway) Gyda Westvold Hansen	(Italy) Annika Sieff	(Slovenia) Ema Volavšek
5	19 February 2022	(Austria) Eisenerz	Erzberg Arena	HS109 / 10 km Mixed Team	Norway Lars Ivar Skårset; Ida Marie Hagen; Gyda Westvold Hansen; Lars Burås	Austria Thomas Rettenegger; Lisa Hirner; Annalena Slamik; Lukas Klapfer	Germany David Mach; Cindy Haasch; Sophia Maurus; Wendelin Thannheimer
6	20 February 2022	(Austria) Eisenerz	Erzberg Arena	HS109 / 5 km	(Norway) Gyda Westvold Hansen	(Italy) Annika Sieff	(Slovenia) Ema Volavšek
	17 March 2022	(Canada) Whistler	Whistler Olympic Park	HS105 / 5 km	Cancelled		
	19 March 2022	(Canada) Whistler	Whistler Olympic Park	HS105 / 5 km	Cancelled		
	26 March 2022	(United States) Lake Placid	Olympic Center	HS100 / 10 km	Cancelled		
	27 March 2022	(United States) Lake Placid	Olympic Center	HS100 / 10 km	Cancelled		

== Standings ==
=== Men's Overall ===
Rank	after 21 events	Points
1	(Germany) Jakob Lange	1206
2	(Germany) David Mach	934
3	(Germany) Wendelin Thannheimer	776
4	(Austria) Thomas Rettenegger	668
5	(Norway) Andreas Skoglund	545
6	(Austria) Marc Luis Rainer	463
7	(Austria) Manuel Einkemmer	449
9	(Norway) Lars Burås	448
9	(Norway) Einar Lurås Oftebro	446
10	(Norway) Lars Ivar Skårset	387

=== Women's Overall ===
Rank	after 6 events	Points
1	(Norway) Gyda Westvold Hansen	400
2	(Italy) Annika Sieff	300
3	(Slovenia) Ema Volavšek	215
4	(Germany) Maria Gerboth	146
5	(Austria) Lisa Hirner	140
6	(Norway) Marte Leinan Lund (France) Lena Brocard	132
8	(United States) Annika Malacinski	120
9	(Russia) Stefaniya Nadymova	87
10	(Germany) Sophia Maurus	86
