= 2022–23 FIS Nordic Combined Continental Cup =

International skiing competition

Nordic Combined Continental Cup 2022/23
Discipline	Men	Women
Overall	(Germany) Terence Weber	(Germany) Sophie Maurus

Competition
Locations	6	3
Individual	14	7
Cancelled	2	2

The 2022/23 FIS Nordic Combined Continental Cup was the 39th Continental Cup season, organized by the International Ski Federation. It started on 17 December 2022 in Ruka, Finland, and was scheduled to conclude on 26 March 2023 in Oberwiesenthal, Germany. However, the last competitions were cancelled.

On 1 March 2022, following the 2022 Russian invasion of Ukraine, FIS decided to exclude athletes from Russia and Belarus from FIS competitions, with an immediate effect.

== Calendar ==
=== Men ===
Num	Date	Place	Location	Discipline	Winner	Second	Third
1	16 December 2022	(Finland) Ruka	Rukatunturi	HS142 / 10 km	(Germany) Terence Weber	(Austria) Manuel Einkemmer	(Norway) Simen Tiller
2	17 December 2022	(Finland) Ruka	Rukatunturi	HS142 / 10 km	(Germany) Terence Weber	(Austria) Christian Deuschl	(Austria) Florian Kolb
3	18 December 2022	(Finland) Ruka	Rukatunturi	HS142 / 10 km	(Austria) Christian Deuschl	(Germany) Terence Weber	(Norway) Andreas Skoglund
4	18 February 2023	(Norway) Rena	Renabakkene	HS109 / 10 km	(Norway) Sebastian Østvold	(Germany) Terence Weber	(Austria) Markus Einkemmer
5	18 February 2023	(Norway) Rena	Renabakkene	HS109 / 1 km Super Sprint	(Austria) Thomas Rettenegger	(Norway) Sebastian Østvold	(Norway) Jakob Eiksund Sæthre
6	19 February 2023	(Norway) Rena	Renabakkene	HS139 / 10 km	(Norway) Einar Lurås Oftebro	(Germany) Terence Weber	(Austria) Thomas Rettenegger
7	25 February 2023	(Germany) Oberstdorf	Audi Arena Oberstdorf	HS137 / 10 km Mass Start	(Norway) Einar Lurås Oftebro	(Germany) Terence Weber	(Austria) Markus Einkemmer
8	25 February 2023	(Germany) Oberstdorf	Audi Arena Oberstdorf	HS137 / 10 km	(Norway) Einar Lurås Oftebro	(Germany) Wendelin Thannheimer	(Norway) Espen Bjørnstad
9	26 February 2023	(Germany) Oberstdorf	Audi Arena Oberstdorf	HS137 / 10 km	(Germany) Terence Weber	(Austria) Markus Einkemmer	(Germany) David Mach
10	3 March 2023	(Austria) Eisenerz	Erzberg Arena	HS109 / 10 km	(Germany) Wendelin Thannheimer	(Austria) Markus Einkemmer	(Germany) David Mach
11	5 March 2023	(Austria) Eisenerz	Erzberg Arena	HS109 / 10 km	(Germany) Wendelin Thannheimer	(Germany) Jakob Lange	(Austria) Markus Einkemmer
12	17 March 2023	(Finland) Lahti	Salpausselkä	HS130 / 10 km Mass Start	(Norway) Andreas Skoglund	(Germany) Terence Weber	(Germany) Wendelin Thannheimer
13	18 March 2023	(Finland) Lahti	Salpausselkä	HS130 / 10 km	(Germany) Terence Weber	(Germany) Wendelin Thannheimer	(Austria) Fabio Obermeyr
14	19 March 2023	(Finland) Lahti	Salpausselkä	HS130 / 2x7.5 km Team Sprint	Germany I Wendelin Thannheimer; David Mach	Austria I Fabio Obermeyr; Christian Deuschl	Germany II; Simon Mach; Richard Stenzel
	25 March 2023	(Germany) Oberwiesenthal	Fichtelbergschanzen	HS106 / 10 km	cancelled		
	26 March 2023	(Germany) Oberwiesenthal	Fichtelbergschanzen	HS106 / 10 km	cancelled		

=== Women ===
Num	Date	Place	Location	Discipline	Winner	Second	Third
1	9 December 2022	(Norway) Lillehammer	Lysgårdsbakken	HS100 / 5 km	(Norway) Gyda Westvold Hansen	(Norway) Ida Marie Hagen	(France) Lena Brocard
2	10 December 2022	(Norway) Lillehammer	Lysgårdsbakken	HS100 / 5 km	(Norway) Gyda Westvold Hansen	(Norway) Ida Marie Hagen	(United States) Annika Malacinski
3	18 February 2023	(Norway) Rena	Renabakkene	HS109 / 5 km	(Italy) Daniela Dejori	(United States) Annika Malacinski	(Germany) Sophia Maurus
4	18 February 2023	(Norway) Rena	Renabakkene	HS109 / 1 km Super Sprint	(Germany) Trine Goepfert	(Italy) Daniela Dejori	(Italy) Veronia Gianmoena
5	19 February 2023	(Norway) Rena	Renabakkene	HS109 / 7,5 km	(Germany) Sophia Maurus	(Germany) Trine Goepfert	(United States) Annika Malacinski
6	3 March 2023	(Austria) Eisenerz	Erzberg Arena	HS109 / 5 km	(Germany) Svenja Würth	(France) Lena Brocard	(Austria) Claudia Purker
7	5 March 2023	(Austria) Eisenerz	Erzberg Arena	HS109 / 5 km	(France) Lena Brocard	(Germany) Cindy Haasch	(Austria) Claudia Purker
	25 March 2023	(Germany) Oberwiesenthal	Fichtelbergschanzen	HS106 / 5 km	cancelled		
	26 March 2023	(Germany) Oberwiesenthal	Fichtelbergschanzen	HS106 / 5 km	cancelled		

=== Mixed ===
Num	Date	Place	Location	Discipline	Winner	Second	Third
1	4 March 2023	(Austria) Eisenerz	Erzberg Arena	HS109 / Mixed 4x2km	Germany; David Mach; Cindy Haasch; Svenja Würth; Wendelin Thannheimer	Austria; Manuel Einkemmer; Annalena Slemik; Claudia Purker; Florian Kolb	Norway; Torje Seljeset; Ingrid Laate; Hanna Midtsundstad; Per Einar Skjæret Strømhaug

== Standings ==
=== Men's Overall ===
Rank	after 14 events	Points
1	(Germany) Terence Weber	875
2	(Germany) Wendelin Thannheimer	577
3	(Austria) Manuel Einkemmer	575
4	(Germany) David Mach	532
5	(Norway) Sebastian Østvold	466
6	(Norway) Einar Lurås Oftebro	431
7	(Norway) Kasper Moen Flatla	392
8	(Austria) Christian Deuschl	391
9	(Germany) Christian Franck	349
10	(Austria) Thomas Rettenegger	302

=== Women's Overall ===
Rank	after 7 events	Points
1	(Germany) Sophia Maurus	329
2	(United States) Annika Malacinski	326
3	(Poland) Joanna Kil	266
4	(Italy) Daniela Dejori	260
5	(France) Lena Brocard	240
6	(Norway) Ingrid Laate	222
7	(Germany) Trine Goepfert	212
8	(Austria) Claudia Purker	206
9	(Norway) Gyda Westvold Hansen	200
10	(Norway) Ida Marie Hagen	160
