= Lårdal (disambiguation) =

Lårdal may refer to:

== Places ==
- Lårdal, a village in Tokke Municipality in Telemark county, Norway
- Lårdal Municipality, a former municipality in Telemark county, Norway
- Lårdal Church, a church in Tokke Municipality in Telemark county, Norway
- Lårdal prestegjeld, a former geographic subdivision of the Church of Norway

== See also ==
- Lardal Municipality
