= Lårdal Municipality =

Former municipality in Telemark, Norway

Lårdal Municipality Lårdal herad
- Former municipality
- Laardal herred (historic name); Laurdal herred (historic name)
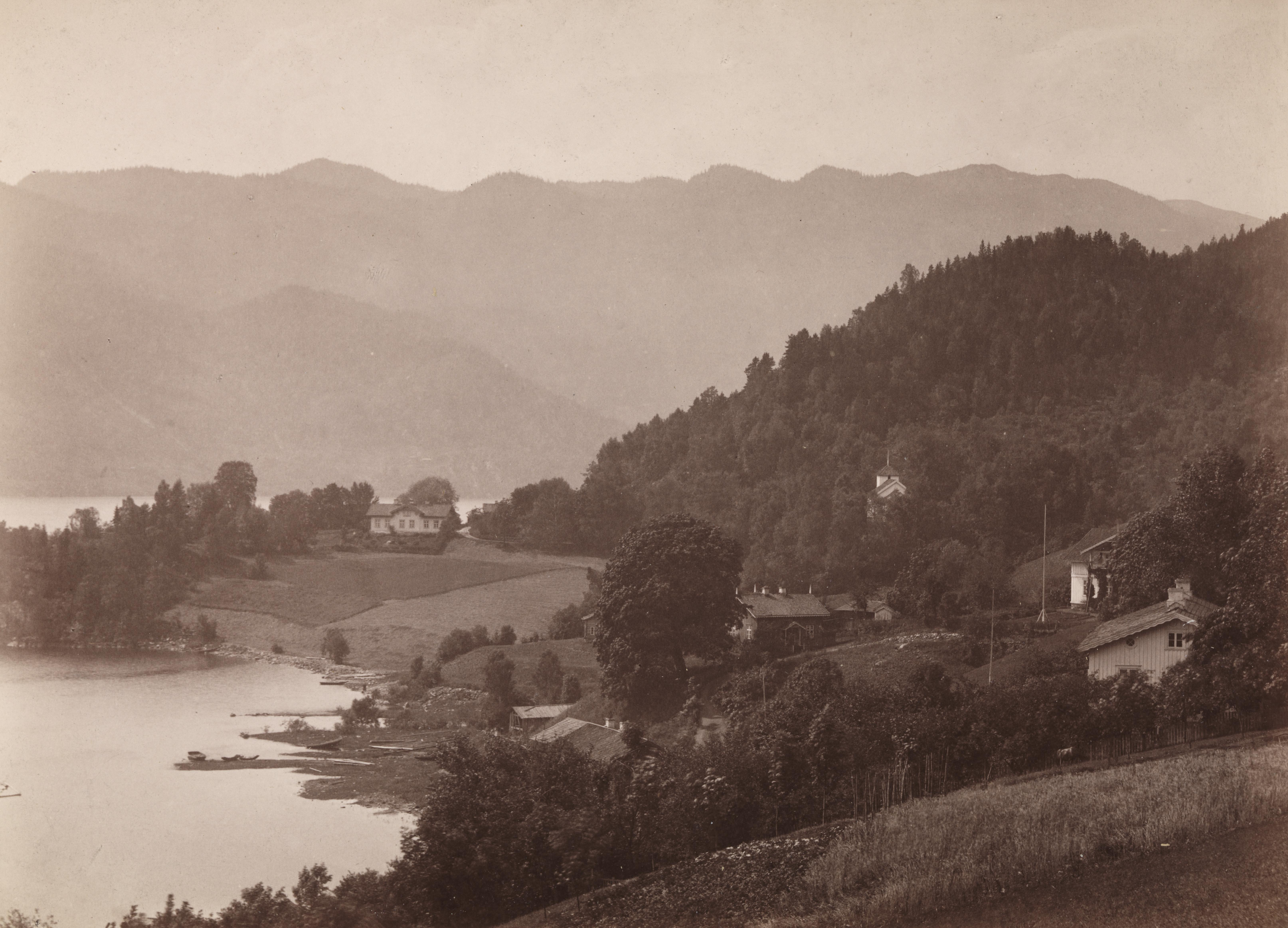
- View of the Lårdal landscape (c. 1885)

- Telemark within Norway

- Lårdal within Telemark
- Coordinates: 59°25′27″N 8°11′10″E
- Country: Norway
- County: Telemark
- District: Vest-Telemark
- Established: 1 Jan 1838
  - Created as: Formannskapsdistrikt
- Disestablished: 1 Jan 1964
  - Succeeded by: Tokke Municipality
- Administrative centre: Lårdal

Government
  - Mayor (1945–1963): Håkon Årneshaugen

Area (upon dissolution)
  - Total: 287.8 km^{2} (111.1 sq mi)
  - Rank: #290 in Norway
- Highest elevation: 1,068 m (3,504 ft)

Population (1963)
  - Total: 1,941
  - Rank: #446 in Norway
  - Density: 6.7/km^{2} (17/sq mi)
  - Change (10 years): ▲ +37.2%
- Demonym: Lårdøl

Official language
  - Norwegian form: Nynorsk
- Time zone: UTC+01:00 (CET)
  - Summer (DST): UTC+02:00 (CEST)
- ISO 3166 code: NO-0833

Lårdal (Norwegian pronunciation: [ˈloːɾˌdɑːɫ]; locally [²loːɖaːɽ]) is a former municipality in Telemark county, Norway. The 287.8-square-kilometre (111.1 sq mi) municipality existed from 1838 until its dissolution in 1964. The area is now part of Tokke Municipality in the traditional district of Øvre Telemark. The administrative centre was the village of Lårdal.

Prior to its dissolution in 1964, the 287.8-square-kilometre (111.1 sq mi) municipality was the 290th largest by area out of the 689 municipalities in Norway. Lårdal Municipality was the 446th most populous municipality in Norway with a population of about 1,941. The municipality's population density was 6.7 inhabitants per square kilometre (17/sq mi) and its population had increased by 37.2% over the previous 10-year period.

== General information ==
=== Administrative history ===
The formannskapsdistrikt law of 1837 created a system of local government in Norway by establishing each Church of Norway prestegjeld as a civil municipality. On 1 January 1838, Laurdal prestegjeld was established as Laurdal Municipality (later spelled "Lårdal"). In 1879 there was a small border adjustment where a part of Laurdal Municipality (population: 6) was transferred to Mo Municipality.

During the 1960s, there were many municipal mergers across Norway due to the work of the Schei Committee. On 1 January 1964, Lårdal Municipality (population: 1,929) was dissolved and merged with Mo Municipality (population: 1,658) to form the new Tokke Municipality.

=== Name ===
The municipality is named after the old Laardal prestegjeld. The prestegjeld was named after the old Laardal farm (Old Norse: Lagardalr) since the first Lårdal Church was built there. The first element is the genitive case of the word lǫgr which means "water" or "river". The last element is dalr which means "valley" or "dale".

Historically, the municipality name was spelled Laurdal (although the parish name goes back centuries as Laugerdal). On 21 December 1917, a royal resolution enacted the 1917 Norwegian language reforms. Prior to this change, the name was spelled Laardal with the digraph "aa", and after this reform, the name was spelled Lårdal, using the letter å instead.

=== Churches ===
The Church of Norway had three parishes (sokn) within Lårdal Municipality. At the time of the municipal dissolution, it was part of the Lårdal prestegjeld and the Vest-Telemark prosti (deanery) in the Diocese of Agder.

Churches in Lårdal Municipality
Parish (sokn)	Church name	Location of the church	Year built
Lårdal	Lårdal Church	Lårdal	1831
Eidsborg	Eidsborg Stave Church	Eidsborg	1200s
Høydalsmo	Høydalsmo Church	Høydalsmo	1747

== Geography ==
The area centered around the Lårdalen valley. The highest point in the municipality was the 1,068-metre (3,504 ft) tall mountain Raudsinutan. Rauland Municipality was located to the north, Seljord Municipality was located to the northeast, Kviteseid Municipality was located to the east, Mo Municipality was located to the southwest, and Vinje Municipality was located to the northwest.

== Government ==
While it existed, Lårdal Municipality was responsible for primary education (through 10th grade), outpatient health services, senior citizen services, welfare and other social services, zoning, economic development, and municipal roads and utilities. The municipality was governed by a municipal council of directly elected representatives. The mayor was indirectly elected by a vote of the municipal council. The municipality was under the jurisdiction of the Vest-Telemark District Court and the Agder Court of Appeal.

=== Municipal council ===
The municipal council (Heradsstyre) of Lårdal Municipality was made up of 21 representatives that were elected to four-year terms. The tables below show the historical composition of the council by political party.

Lårdal heradsstyre 1959–1963
Party name (in Nynorsk)	Number of representatives
Labour Party (Arbeidarpartiet)	14
Conservative Party (Høgre)	1
Centre Party (Senterpartiet)	4
Liberal Party (Venstre)	2
Total number of members:	21
Note: On 1 January 1964, Lårdal Municipality became part of Tokke Municipality.

Lårdal heradsstyre 1955–1959
Party name (in Nynorsk)	Number of representatives
Labour Party (Arbeidarpartiet)	13
Christian Democratic Party (Kristeleg Folkeparti)	2
Joint List(s) of Non-Socialist Parties (Borgarlege Felleslister)	6
Total number of members:	21

Lårdal heradsstyre 1951–1955
Party name (in Nynorsk)	Number of representatives
Labour Party (Arbeidarpartiet)	13
Christian Democratic Party (Kristeleg Folkeparti)	4
Joint List(s) of Non-Socialist Parties (Borgarlege Felleslister)	7
Total number of members:	24

Lårdal heradsstyre 1947–1951
Party name (in Nynorsk)	Number of representatives
Labour Party (Arbeidarpartiet)	14
Communist Party (Kommunistiske Parti)	1
Christian Democratic Party (Kristeleg Folkeparti)	2
Joint List(s) of Non-Socialist Parties (Borgarlege Felleslister)	7
Total number of members:	24

Lårdal heradsstyre 1945–1947
Party name (in Nynorsk)	Number of representatives
Labour Party (Arbeidarpartiet)	16
Joint List(s) of Non-Socialist Parties (Borgarlege Felleslister)	8
Total number of members:	24

Lårdal heradsstyre 1937–1941*
Party name (in Nynorsk)	Number of representatives
Labour Party (Arbeidarpartiet)	15
Joint List(s) of Non-Socialist Parties (Borgarlege Felleslister)	9
Total number of members:	24
Note: Due to the German occupation of Norway during World War II, no elections were held for new municipal councils until after the war ended in 1945.

=== Mayors ===
The mayor (Nynorsk: ordførar) of Lårdal Municipality was the political leader of the municipality and the chairperson of the municipal council. The following people have held this position:

- 1838–1843: Rev. Bendt Wettergren
- 1844–1845: Knut Saaveson Aakeren
- 1846–1848: Olav T. Huvestad
- 1849–1850: Tarjei Mikkelson Mandt
- 1851–1854: Kristoffer Skjelbreid
- 1855–1856: Jørgen Espetveit
- 1857–1866: Nils Laurirz Wiborg
- 1867–1870: Steinar P. Mandt
- 1871–1874: Olav L. Omdal
- 1875–1876: Steinar P. Mandt
- 1877–1880: Nils P. Bjaaland
- 1881–1882: Olav E. Sandland
- 1883–1884: Tjøstolv Mandt
- 1885–1889: Olav E. Sandland
- 1890–1891: Jarand O. Reffelbrekk
- 1892–1893: John H. Ofte
- 1894–1898: Nils Heggtveit
- 1899–1916: J.J. Hegna
- 1917–1919: Nils Heggtveit
- 1920–1925: J.J. Hegna
- 1926–1928: Olav G. Sending
- 1929–1931: J.J. Hegna
- 1932–1934: Karl Kleve
- 1935–1941: Håkon Årneshaugen
- 1941–1945: Olav G. Sending
- 1945–1963: Håkon Årneshaugen

== See also ==
- List of former municipalities of Norway
