= Friedrich Moch =

German cross-country skier (born 2000)

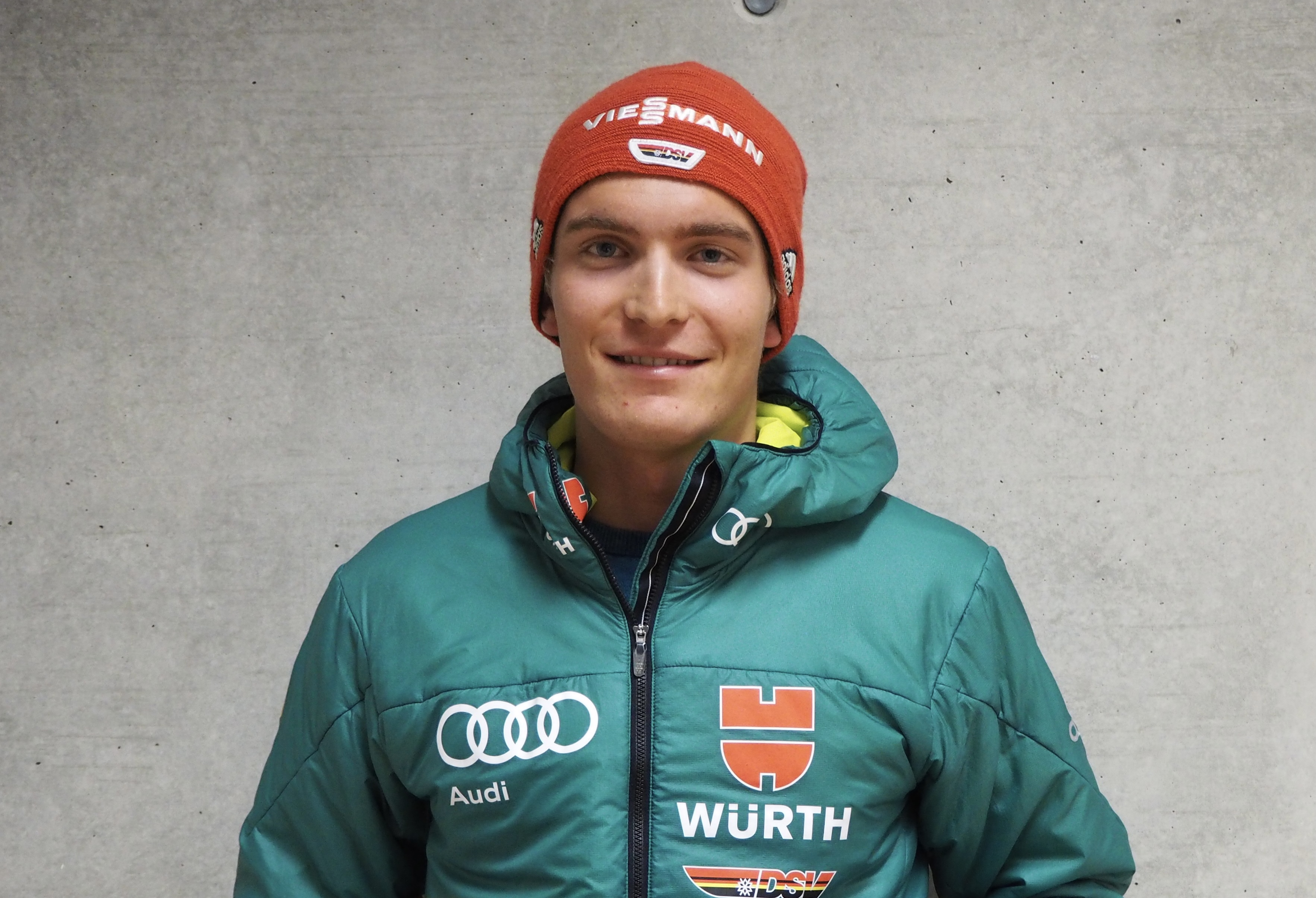

Personal information
- Nationality: Germany
- Born: 12 April 2000 (age 26) Memmingen, Germany
- Height: 1.85 m (6 ft 1 in)

Sport
- Sport: Skiing
- Club: WSV Isny

World Cup career
- Seasons: 5 – (2021–present)
- Indiv. starts: 81
- Indiv. podiums: 3
- Indiv. wins: 0
- Team starts: 6
- Team podiums: 1
- Overall titles: 0 – (6th in 2024)
- Discipline titles: 0
Medal record
Men's cross-country skiing
Representing Germany
World Championships
| Bronze medal – third place | 2023 Planica | 4 × 10 km relay |
U23 World Championships
| Silver medal – second place | 2021 Vuokatti | 15 km freestyle |
Junior World Championships
| Silver medal – second place | 2020 Oberwiesenthal | 10 km classical |
| Silver medal – second place | 2020 Oberwiesenthal | 30 km freestyle |
| Bronze medal – third place | 2019 Lahti | 4 × 5 km relay |
- Updated on 1 March 2025

Friedrich Moch (born 12 April 2000) is a German cross-country skier.

He participated in the pursuit event at the FIS Nordic World Ski Championships 2021.

== Cross-country skiing results ==
All results are sourced from the International Ski Federation (FIS).

=== Olympic Games ===
| Year | Age | 15 km individual | 30 km skiathlon | 50 km mass start | Sprint | 4 × 10 km relay | Team sprint |
|---|---|---|---|---|---|---|---|
| 2022 | 21 | — | 13 | 31^{[a]} | — | 5 | — |

^{a} Distance reduced to 30 km due to weather conditions.

=== World Championships ===
- 1 medal – (1 bronze)

| Year | Age | 15 km individual | 30 km skiathlon | 50 km mass start | Sprint | 4 × 10 km relay | Team sprint |
|---|---|---|---|---|---|---|---|
| 2021 | 20 | 24 | 38 | 20 | — | 7 | — |
| 2023 | 22 | 8 | 7 | — | — | Bronze | 7 |
| 2025 | 24 | 25 | 10 | 15 | — | 8 | — |

=== World Cup ===
==== Season standings ====
| Season | Age | Discipline standings | | | | Ski Tour standings | |
| Season | Age | Overall | Distance | Sprint | U23 | Nordic Opening | Tour de Ski |
|---|---|---|---|---|---|---|---|
| 2021 | 20 | 69 | 49 | NC | 8 | 44 | — |
| 2022 | 21 | 29 | 24 | NC | 2nd place, silver medalist(s) | —N/a | 14 |
| 2023 | 22 | 21 | 13 | 102 | 4 | —N/a | 8 |
| 2024 | 23 | 6 | 6 | 123 | —N/a | —N/a | 2nd place, silver medalist(s) |
| 2025 | 24 | 12 | 11 | NC | —N/a | —N/a | 6 |

==== Individual podiums ====
- 4 podiums – (1 WC, 3 SWC)

| No. | Season | Date | Location | Race | Level | Place |
|---|---|---|---|---|---|---|
| 1 | 2021–22 | 4 January 2022 | Val di Fiemme, Italy | 10 km Mass Start F | Stage World Cup | 3rd |
| 2 | 2023–24 | 7 January 2024 | Val di Fiemme, Italy | 10 km Mass Start F | Stage World Cup | 2nd |
| 3 | 2023–24 | 30 December 2023 – 7 January 2024 | (Italy) (Switzerland) (Italy) Tour de Ski | Overall Standings | World Cup | 2nd |
| 4 | 2024–25 | 5 January 2025 | Val di Fiemme, Italy | 10 km Mass Start F | Stage World Cup | 3rd |

==== Team podiums ====
- 1 podium – (1 RL)

| No. | Season | Date | Location | Race | Level | Place | Teammate(s) |
|---|---|---|---|---|---|---|---|
| 1 | 2023–24 | 3 December 2023 | Gällivare, Sweden | 4 × 7.5 km Relay C/F | World Cup | 3rd | Brugger / Kuchler / Sossau |
