= Oftebro =

Oftebro is a surname. Notable people with the surname include:

- Einar Lurås Oftebro (born 1998), Norwegian Nordic combined skier
- Jakob Oftebro (born 1986), Norwegian actor
- Jens Lurås Oftebro (born 2000), Norwegian Nordic combined skier, brother of Einar
- Nils Ole Oftebro (born 1944), Norwegian actor and illustrator
