= Lårdal =

Village in Tokke Municipality, Norway

Lårdal Laardal (historic)
- Village
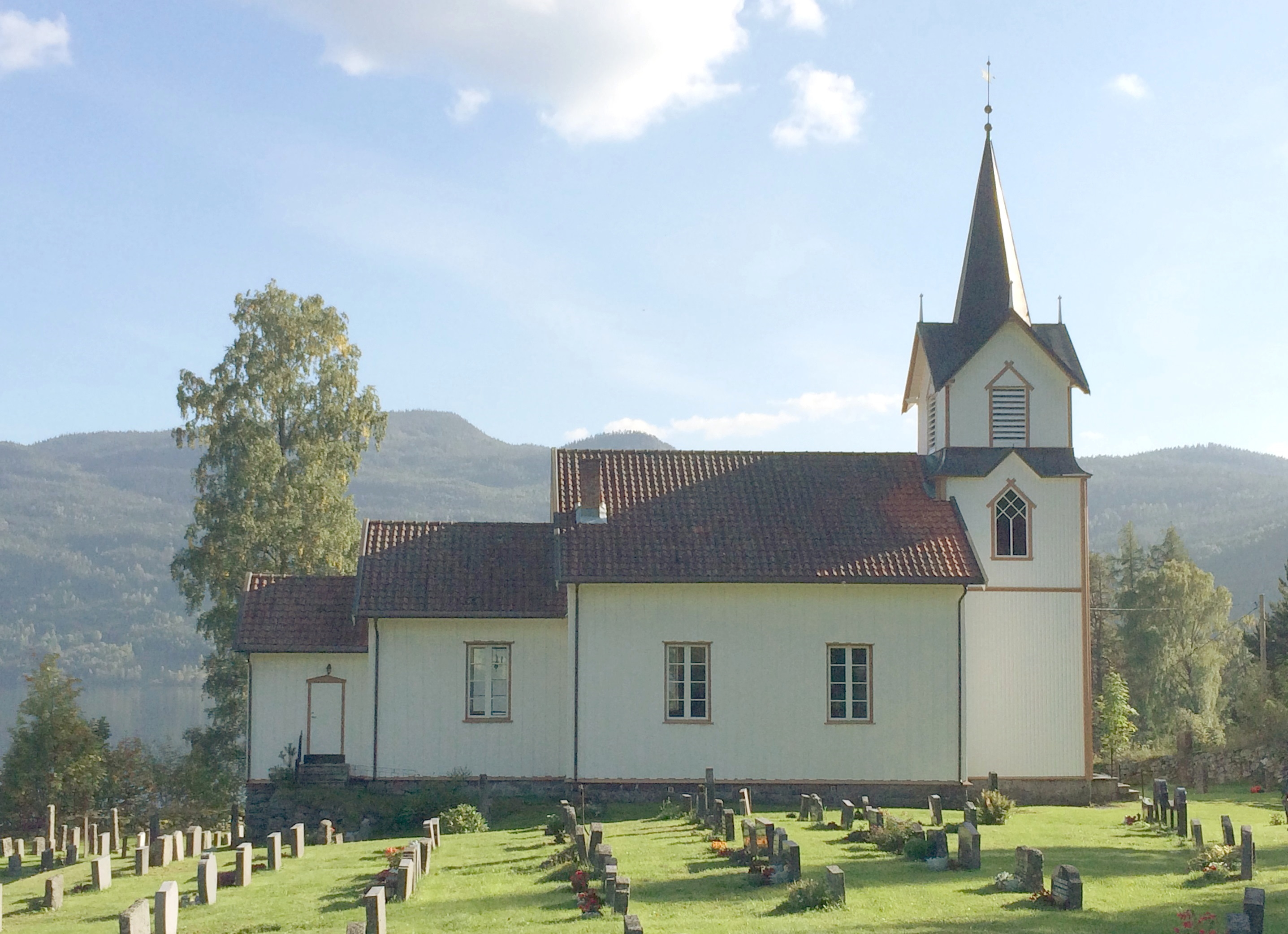
- View of the village church
- Interactive map of Lårdal
- Coordinates: 59.42412°N 8.18619°E
- Country: Norway
- Region: Eastern Norway
- County: Telemark
- District: Vest-Telemark
- Municipality: Tokke Municipality
- Elevation: 75 m (246 ft)
- Time zone: UTC+01:00 (CET)
  - Summer (DST): UTC+02:00 (CEST)
- Post Code: 3891 Høydalsmo

Lårdal is a village in Tokke Municipality in Telemark county, Norway. The village is located on the north shore of the lake Bandak and about 10 kilometres (6.2 mi) south of the village of Høydalsmo and the European route E134 highway. The village is the site of Lårdal Church, a school, and a fast food store. Previously, there was also a grocery store, but it closed.

== History ==
The village was historically the administrative centre of the old Lårdal Municipality from 1838 until its dissolution in 1964.

=== Name ===
The village (originally the parish) is named after the old Laardal farm (Old Norse: Lagardalr) since the first Lårdal Church was built there. The first element is lǫgr which means "water" or "river". The last element is dalr which means "dale" or "valley". Historically, the municipality name was spelled "Laurdal" (although the parish name goes back centuries as Laugerdal). From 1884-1920, it was spelled "Laardal". Since 1921, it has been spelled "Lårdal".

== Notable people ==
- Bjørn Honerød, a former journalist and television presenter from Lårdal
