= Leif Torbjørn Næsvold =

Norwegian Nordic combined skier (born 1998)

Leif Torbjørn Næsvold (born 5 March 1998) is a Norwegian Nordic combined skier.

He competed at the 2015 European Youth Olympic Winter Festival as well as the 2016 and 2017 Junior World Championships. In 2016 he recorded a 5th place in the team event and a 10th place individually.

He made his Continental Cup debut in January 2017 in Høydalsmo, and won his first races in January 2019 in Rukatunturi, with back-to-back-to-back victories in the three individual and team events.

He made his World Cup debut in November 2018 in Lillehammer, also collecting his first World Cup points with a 21st place. In the 2019–20 season he managed three 20th places in a row.

He represents the sports club Røykenhopp.
