= Håkon Skaanes =

Norwegian cross-country skier

Personal information
- Nationality: Norway
- Born: September 1, 1999 (age 26)

Sport
- Sport: Skiing
- Club: Strindheim IL

World Cup career
- Seasons: 1 – (2022–present)
- Indiv. starts: 4
- Indiv. podiums: 0
- Team starts: 0
- Overall titles: 0 – (72nd in 2022)
- Discipline titles: 0
Medal record
Men's cross-country skiing
Representing Norway
Junior World Championships
Bronze medal – third place	2019 Lahti	Individual sprint
- Updated on 28 March 2022

Håkon Skaanes (born 1 September 1999) is a Norwegian cross-country skier.

Competing in four events at the 2019 Junior World Championships, his biggest successes were a fourth place in the 4 × 5 kilometre relay and the bronze medal in the sprint event. He later finished 13th in the U23 group at the 2021 Junior World Championships.

He made his World Cup debut at the December 2021 sprint in Lillehammer, also collecting his first World Cup points with a 19th place.

He represents the sports club Strindheim IL and is the son of former cross-country skier Øyvind Skaanes, and younger brother of Marte Skaanes.

== Cross-country skiing results ==
All results are sourced from the International Ski Federation (FIS).

=== World Cup ===
==== Season standings ====
Season	Age	Discipline standings				Ski Tour standings
Season	Age	Overall	Distance	Sprint	U23	Tour de Ski
2014	22	72	—	36	10	—
