= Thomas Aasen Markeng =

Norwegian ski jumper (born 2000)

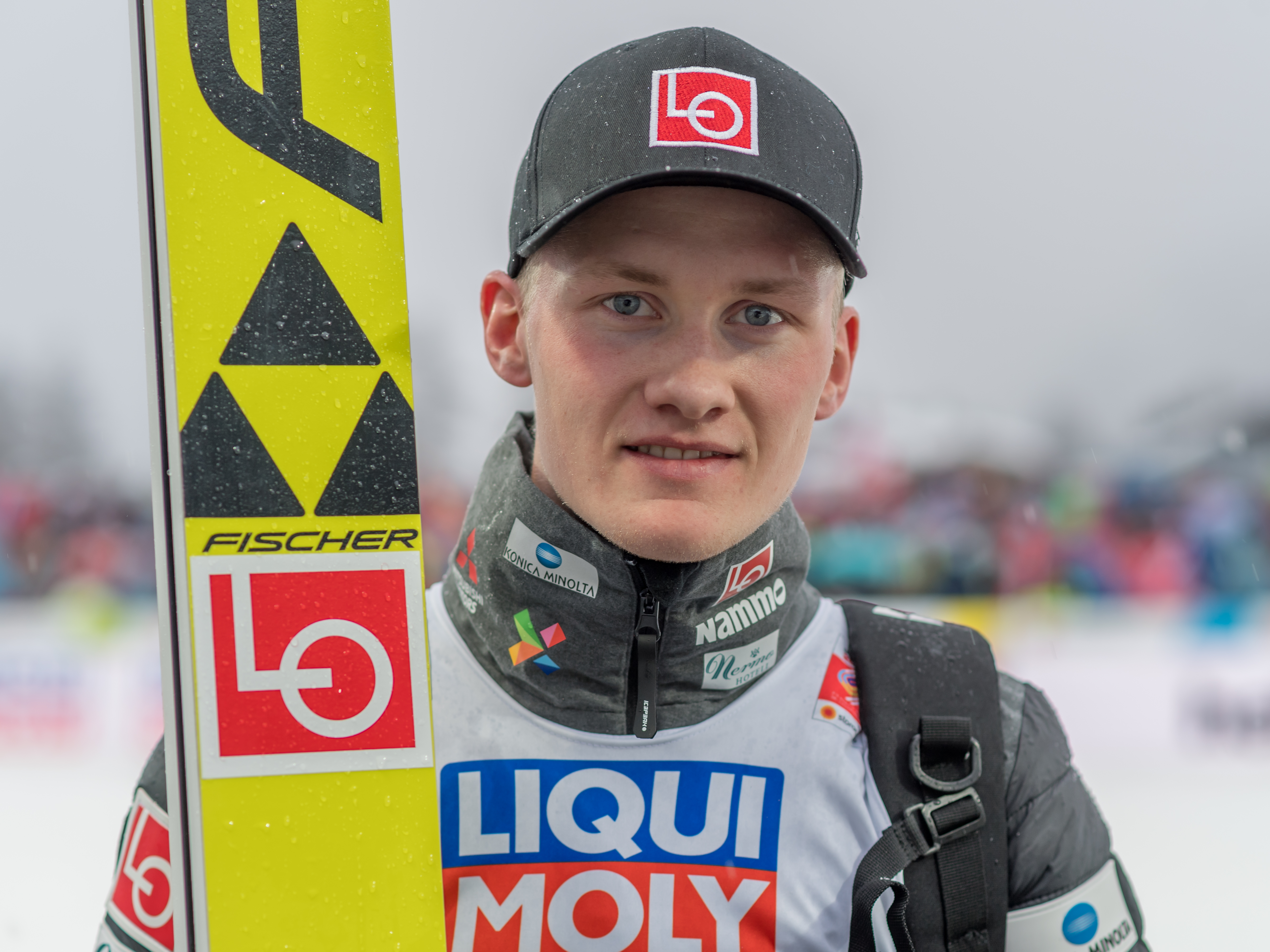
- Seefeld, March 1, 2019: FIS Nordic World Ski Championships, Men Ski Jump HS 109

Personal information
- Born: 18 June 2000 (age 25)

Sport
- Country: Norwegian
- Sport: Skiing
- Club: Lensbygda SK

Thomas Aasen Markeng (born 18 June 2000) is a Norwegian former ski jumper.

At the 2018 Junior World Championships he won a bronze medal in the team competition, and at the 2019 Junior World Championships he won the gold medal in the normal hill as well as a team silver medal. He made his Continental Cup debut on the summer circuit in August 2017 in Szczyrk, recording his first podiums in February 2019 in Iron Mountain, Michigan with a victory and a third place.

He made his FIS Ski Jumping World Cup debut in February 2019 in Willingen, where he also collected his first World Cup points with a 27th-place finish. The same month he received a berth on the Norwegian World Championships team.

He represented the sports club Lensbygda SK.
