= 2019 Nordic Junior World Ski Championships =

Ski event in Lahti, Finland

FIS Nordic Junior and U23 World Ski Championships 2019
- Host city: Lahti, Finland
- Events: 23
- Opening: 19 January
- Closing: 27 January
- Main venue: Lahti Stadium
- Website: jwsc2019.com

The FIS Nordic Junior and U23 World Ski Championships 2019 took place in Lahti, Finland from 19 January to 27 January 2019. This was the 42nd Junior World Championships and the 14th Under-23 World Championships in Nordic skiing.

This was the first championship where women compete in Nordic combined. Ayane Miyazaki of Japan became the first female junior world champion by winning the normal hill/5 kilometre event on 23 January 2019.

== Schedule ==
All times are local (UTC+2).

Cross-country

Date	Time	Event
20 January	14:00	Men's junior sprint Ladies' junior sprint
21 January	14:00	Men's under-23 sprint Ladies' under-23 sprint
22 January	12:00	Ladies' junior 5 km free
22 January	14:00	Men's junior 10 km free
23 January	09:30	Ladies' under-23 10 km free
23 January	12:00	Men's under-23 15 km free
24 January	10:00	Ladies' junior 15 km mass start
24 January	12:30	Men's junior 30 km mass start
25 January	10:00	Ladies' under-23 15 km mass start
25 January	12:30	Men's under-23 30 km mass start
26 January	10:30	Ladies' junior 4×3.33 km relay
26 January	12:15	Men's junior 4×5 km relay

Nordic combined

Date	Time	Event
23 January	11:00; 15:30	Ladies' HS100 / 5 km
23 January	14:00; 16:30	Men's HS100 / 5 km
25 January	11:00; 16:30	Men's team HS100 / 4×5 km
27 January	10:00; 12:30	Men's HS100 / 10 km

Ski jumping

Date	Time	Event
24 January	15:00	Ladies' HS100
24 January	18:30	Men's HS100
26 January	15:00	Ladies' team HS100
26 January	18:30	Men's team HS100
27 January	15:00	Mixed team HS100

== Medal summary ==
=== Junior events ===
==== Cross-country skiing ====
Event	Gold		Silver		Bronze	
Men's Junior Events
Sprint classic	Alexander Terentyev; Russia	3:26.33	Ansgar Evensen; Norway	3:29.21	Håkon Skaanes; Norway	3:29.22
10 kilometre free	Jules Chappaz; France	22:34.9	Alexander Terentyev; Russia	22:55.9	Iver Tildheim Andersen; Norway	23:02.1
30 kilometre mass start classic	Luca Del Fabbro; Italy	1:15:16.7	Håvard Moseby; Norway	1:15.17.1	Cyril Fähndrich; Switzerland	1:15.17.2
4 × 5 kilometre relay	United States; Luke Jager; Ben Ogden; Johnny Hagenbuch; Gus Schumacher	45:34.7	Russia; Egor Trefilov; Andrey Kuznetsov; Yaroslav Egoshin; Alexander Terentyev	45:38.5	Germany; Jakob Milz; Florian Knopf; Anian Sossau; Friedrich Moch	45:41.0
Ladies' Junior Events
Sprint classic	Kristine Stavås Skistad; Norway	3:23.12	Monika Skinder; Poland	3:23.75	Anita Korva; Finland	3:23.83
5 kilometre free	Frida Karlsson; Sweden	12:50.6	Helene Marie Fossesholm; Norway	13:01.7	Anita Korva; Finland	13:10.4
15 kilometre mass start classic	Frida Karlsson; Sweden	40:54.3	Helene Marie Fossesholm; Norway	41:37.4	Anita Korva; Finland	41:43.4
4 × 3.3 kilometre relay	Norway; Kristin Austgulen Fosnæs; Astrid Stav; Helene Marie Fossesholm; Kristine Stavås Skistad	35:24.7	Russia; Anastasiya Faleyeva; Kristina Kuskova; Veronika Stepanova; Anna Grukhvina	35:25.7	Sweden; Louise Lindström; Frida Karlsson; Tilde Bångman; Linn Svahn	35:58.0

==== Nordic combined ====
Event	Gold		Silver		Bronze	
Men's Junior Events
Individual normal hill/10 km	Johannes Lamparter; Austria	28:16.8	Julian Schmid; Germany	28:29.0	Andreas Skoglund; Norway	28:48.2
Individual normal hill/5 km	Julian Schmid; Germany	13:43.0	Johannes Lamparter; Austria	13:48.3	Jens Lurås Oftebro; Norway	13:56.5
Team normal hill/4 × 5 km	Germany; Luis Lehnert; Simon Hüttel; David Mach; Julian Schmid	53:16.4	Norway; Aleksander Skoglund; Kasper Moen Flatla; Jens Lurås Oftebro; Andreas Skoglund	53.30.7	Austria; Florian Dagn; Max Teeling; Johannes Lamparter; Marc Luis Rainer	53.38.9
Ladies' Junior Events
Individual normal hill/5 km	Ayane Miyazaki; Japan	17:43.8	Gyda Westvold Hansen; Norway	17:47.4	Anju Nakamura; Japan	18:02.3

==== Ski jumping ====
Event	Gold		Silver		Bronze	
Men's Junior Events
Individual normal hill	Thomas Aasen Markeng; Norway	252.1	Luca Roth; Germany	250.8	Sergey Tkachenko; Kazakhstan	248.9
Team normal hill	Germany; Luca Roth; Kilian Märkl; Philipp Raimund; Constantin Schmid	979.7	Norway; Fredrik Villumstad; Anders Ladehaug; Sander Vossan Eriksen; Thomas Aasen Markeng	976.8	Slovenia; Aljaž Osterc; Jan Bombek; Jernej Presečnik; Žak Mogel	952.6
Ladies' Junior Events
Individual normal hill	Anna Shpyneva; Russia	253.1	Lidiia Iakovleva; Russia	252.4	Lara Malsiner; Italy	249.9
Team normal hill	Russia; Mariia Iakovleva; Aleksandra Barantceva; Anna Shpyneva; Lidiia Iakovleva	912.2	Germany; Jenny Nowak; Josephin Laue; Selina Freitag; Agnes Reisch	845.4	Austria; Marita Kramer; Lisa Hirner; Claudia Purker; Lisa Eder	831.6
Mixed Junior Events
Team normal hill	Russia; Anna Shpyneva; Mikhail Purtov; Lidiia Iakovleva; Maksim Sergeev	984.4	Norway; Ingebjørg Saglien Bråten; Fredrik Villumstad; Silje Opseth; Thomas Aasen Markeng	979.6	Germany; Agnes Reisch; Luca Roth; Selina Freitag; Constantin Schmid	964.8

=== Under-23 events ===
==== Cross-country skiing ====
Event	Gold		Silver		Bronze	
Men's Under-23 Events
Sprint classic	Erik Valnes; Norway	3:21.14	Sergey Ardashev; Russia	3:22.52	Joachim Aurland; Norway	3:23.14
15 kilometre free	Jules Lapierre; France	34:02.8	Michal Novák; Czech Republic	34:32.6	Ivan Yakimushkin; Russia	34:32.8
30 kilometre mass start classic	Andrey Sobakarev; Russia	1:17:19.2	Ivan Kirillov; Russia	1:17:22.6	Ivan Yakimushkin; Russia	1:17:24.0
Ladies' Under-23 Events
Sprint classic	Moa Lundgren; Sweden	3:18.33	Tiril Udnes Weng; Norway	3:18.38	Aida Bayazitova; Russia	3:22.11
10 kilometre free	Mariya Istomina; Russia	25:57.3	Eveliina Piippo; Finland	25:59.3	Tiril Udnes Weng; Norway	26:26.9
15 kilometre mass start classic	Anna Zherebyatyeva; Russia	40:31.4	Lidiya Durkina; Russia	40:54.9	Katharina Hennig; Germany	41:08.9

=== Medal tables ===
==== All events ====
* Host nation (Finland)

Rank	Nation	Gold	Silver	Bronze	Total
1	Russia (RUS)	7	7	3	17
2	Norway (NOR)	4	9	6	19
3	Germany (GER)	3	3	3	9
4	Sweden (SWE)	3	0	1	4
5	France (FRA)	2	0	0	2
6	Austria (AUT)	1	1	2	4
7	Italy (ITA)	1	0	1	2
7	Japan (JPN)	1	0	1	2
9	United States (USA)	1	0	0	1
10	Finland (FIN)*	0	1	3	4
11	Czech Republic (CZE)	0	1	0	1
11	Poland (POL)	0	1	0	1
13	Kazakhstan (KAZ)	0	0	1	1
13	Slovenia (SLO)	0	0	1	1
13	Switzerland (SUI)	0	0	1	1
Totals (15 entries)		23	23	23	69

==== Junior events ====
* Host nation (Finland)

Rank	Nation	Gold	Silver	Bronze	Total
1	Russia (RUS)	4	4	0	8
2	Norway (NOR)	3	8	4	15
3	Germany (GER)	3	3	2	8
4	Sweden (SWE)	2	0	1	3
5	Austria (AUT)	1	1	2	4
6	Italy (ITA)	1	0	1	2
6	Japan (JPN)	1	0	1	2
8	France (FRA)	1	0	0	1
8	United States (USA)	1	0	0	1
10	Poland (POL)	0	1	0	1
11	Finland (FIN)*	0	0	3	3
12	Kazakhstan (KAZ)	0	0	1	1
12	Slovenia (SLO)	0	0	1	1
12	Switzerland (SUI)	0	0	1	1
Totals (14 entries)		17	17	17	51

==== Under-23 events ====
* Host nation (Finland)

Rank	Nation	Gold	Silver	Bronze	Total
1	Russia (RUS)	3	3	3	9
2	Norway (NOR)	1	1	2	4
3	France (FRA)	1	0	0	1
3	Sweden (SWE)	1	0	0	1
5	Czech Republic (CZE)	0	1	0	1
5	Finland (FIN)*	0	1	0	1
7	Germany (GER)	0	0	1	1
Totals (7 entries)		6	6	6	18
