= Anian Sossau =

German cross-country skier (born 2000)

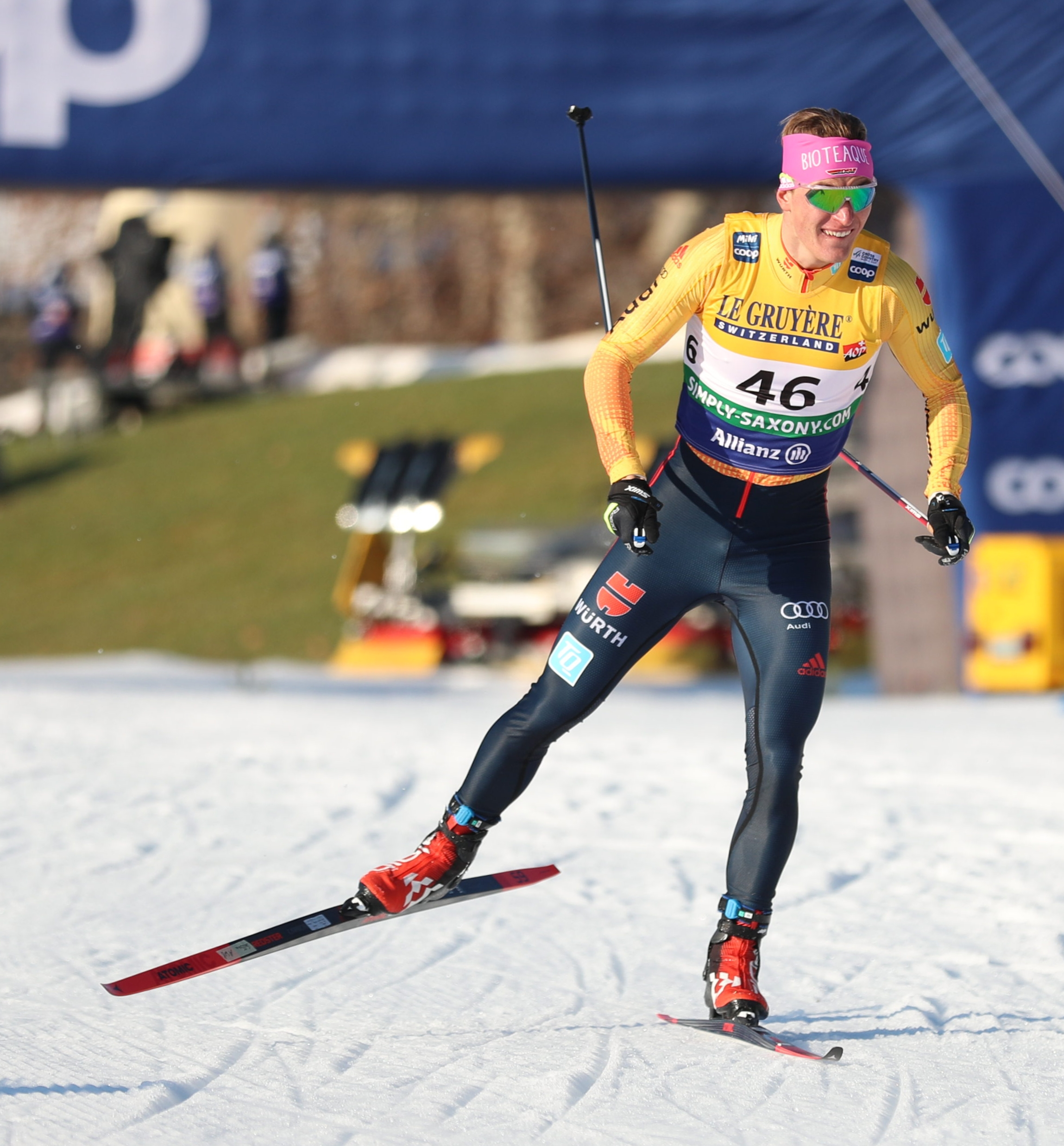

Personal information
- Nationality: Germany
- Born: 14 January 2000 (age 26)
- Height: 1.82 m (6 ft 0 in)

Sport
- Sport: Skiing
- Club: SC Eisenärzt

World Cup career
- Seasons: 4 – (2020–present)
- Indiv. starts: 9
- Indiv. podiums: 0
- Team starts: 5
- Team podiums: 1
- Overall titles: 0 – (124th in 2023)
- Discipline titles: 0
Medal record
Men's cross-country skiing
Representing Germany
Junior World Championships
Bronze medal – third place	2019 Lahti	4 × 5 km relay
- Updated on 29 March 2023

Anian Sossau (born 14 January 2000) is a German cross-country skier.

He participated in the sprint event at the FIS Nordic World Ski Championships 2021.

== Cross-country skiing results ==
All results are sourced from the International Ski Federation (FIS).

=== World Championships ===
Year	Age	15 km individual	30 km skiathlon	50 km mass start	Sprint	4 × 10 km relay	Team sprint
2021	21	—	—	—	38	—	—

=== World Cup ===
==== Season standings ====
Season	Age	Discipline standings				Ski Tour standings			
Season	Age	Overall	Distance	Sprint	U23	Nordic Opening	Tour de Ski	Ski Tour 2020	World Cup Final
2020	20	NC	—	NC	NC	—	—	—	—N/a
2021	21	NC	—	NC	NC	—	—	—N/a	—N/a
2022	22	149	—	83	25	—N/a	—	—N/a	—N/a
2023	23	124	NC	66	20	—N/a	DNF	—N/a	—N/a

==== Team podiums ====
- 1 podium – (1 RL)

No.	Season	Date	Location	Race	Level	Place	Teammates
1	2022–23	19 March 2023	Falun, Sweden	4 × 5 km Mixed Relay C/F	World Cup	3rd	Kuchler / Hennig / Carl
