= Lars Ivar Skårset =

Norwegian Nordic combined skier

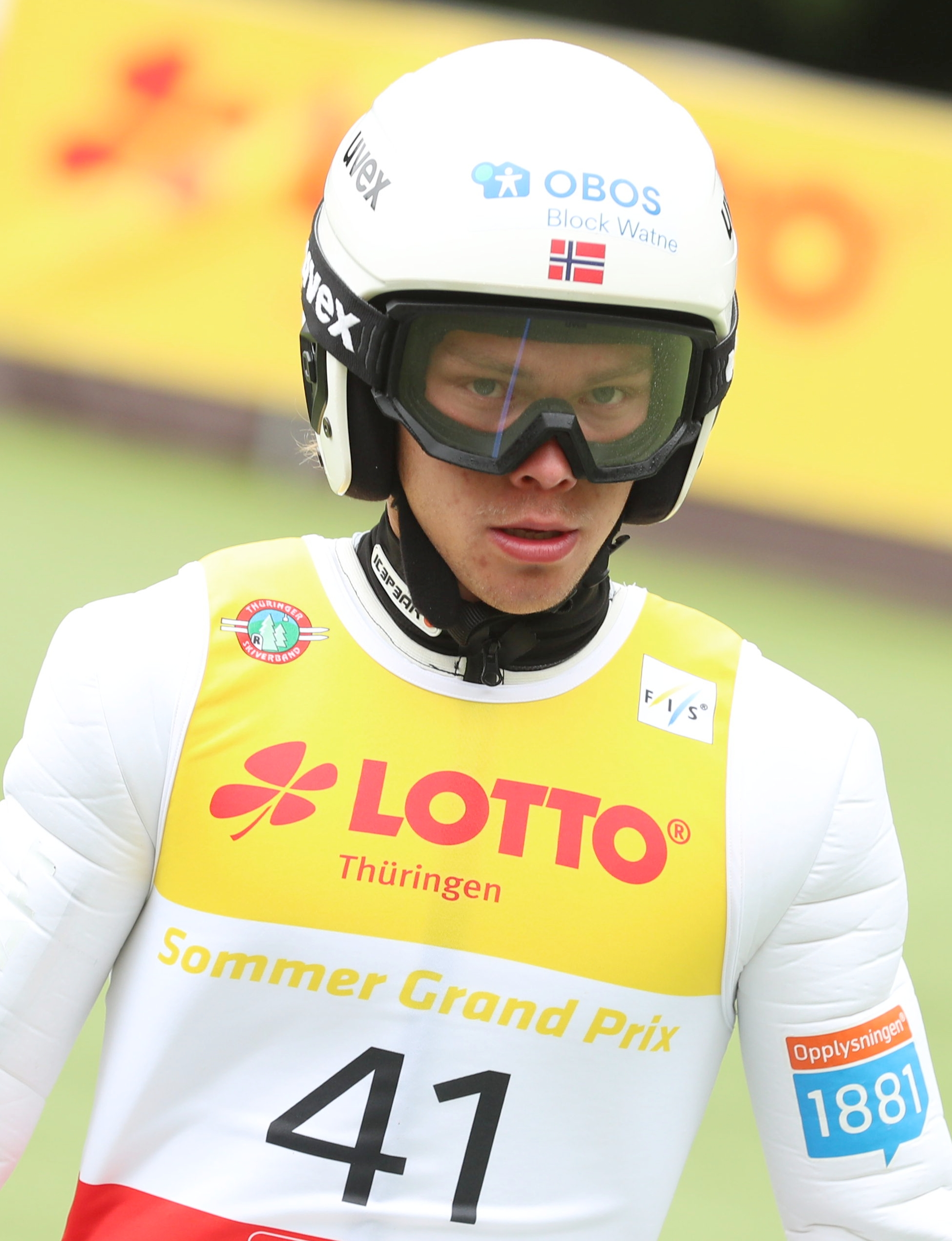
Lars Ivar Skårset (2021)

Lars Ivar Skårset (born 5 January 1998) is a Norwegian Nordic combined skier.

He finished ninth at the 2015 European Youth Olympic Winter Festival, and competed the 2016 and 2017 Junior World Championships. In 2016 he recorded a 5th place in the team event and in 2017 an 8th place individually.

He made his Continental Cup debut in January 2017 in Høydalsmo, won his first race in January 2020 in Rena and also managed back-to-back victories the next week in Planica.

He made his World Cup debut in February 2019 in Klingenthal, also collecting his first World Cup points with a 22nd place. In February and March 2020 he broke the top 20 with a run of 16th, 17th, 13th places.

He represents the sports club Søre Ål IL.
