= Høydalsmo Church =

Church in Telemark, Norway

- Høydalsmo kyrkje
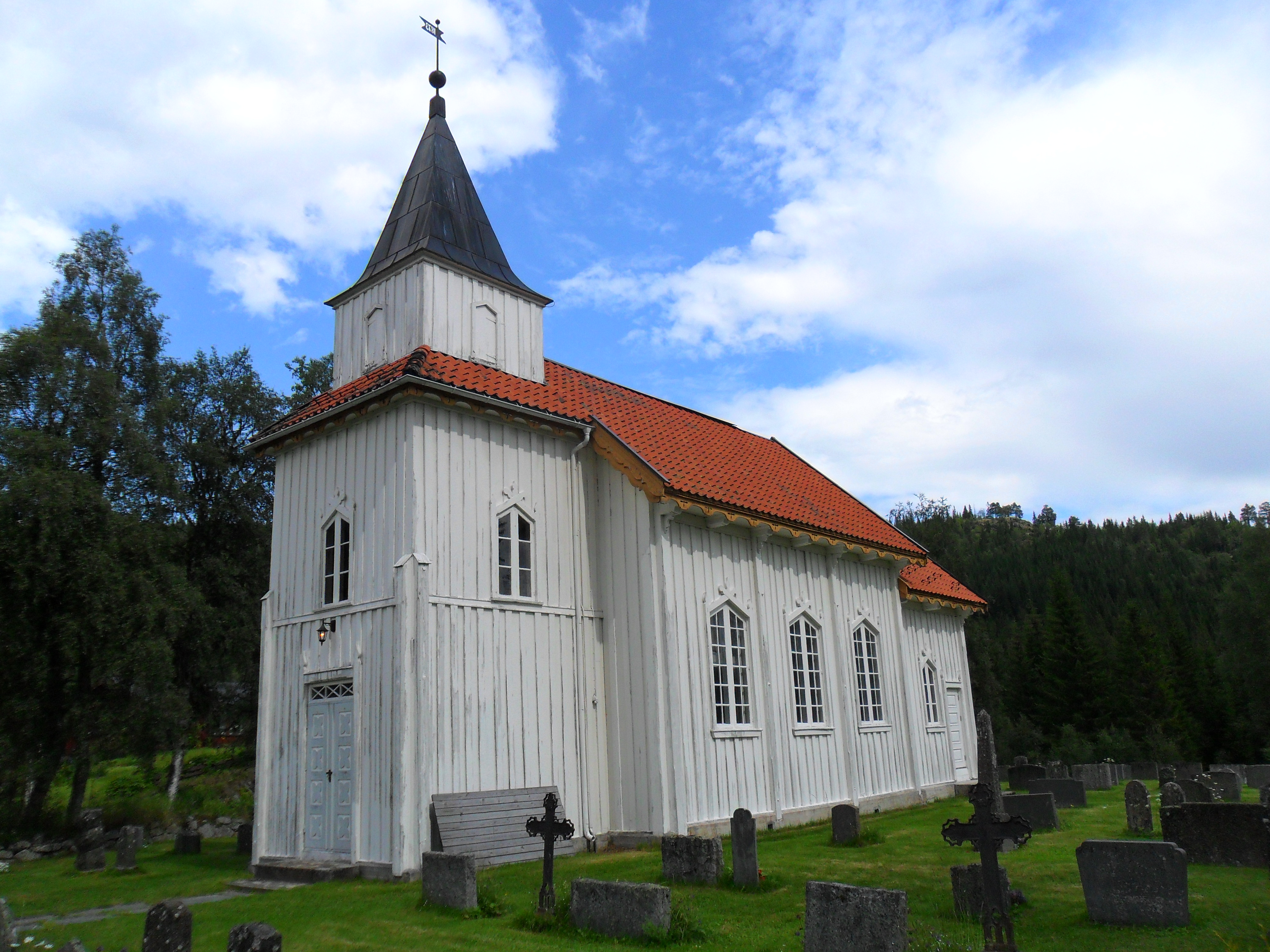
- View of the church
- Høydalsmo Church
- 59°29′26″N 8°13′56″E
- Location: Tokke Municipality, Telemark
- Country: Norway
- Denomination: Church of Norway
- Previous denomination: Catholic Church
- Churchmanship: Evangelical Lutheran

History
- Status: Parish church
- Founded: 13th century
- Consecrated: 18 October 1747

Architecture
- Functional status: Active
- Architectural type: Long church
- Completed: 1747 (279 years ago)

Specifications
- Capacity: 60
- Materials: Wood

Administration
- Diocese: Agder og Telemark
- Deanery: Øvre Telemark prosti
- Parish: Høydalsmo og Lårdal
- Norwegian Cultural Heritage Site
- Type: Church
- Status: Automatically protected
- ID: 84701

Høydalsmo Church (Norwegian: Høydalsmo kyrkje) is a parish church of the Church of Norway in Tokke Municipality in Telemark county, Norway. It is located in the village of Høydalsmo. It is one of the churches for the Høydalsmo og Lårdal parish which is part of the Øvre Telemark prosti (deanery) in the Diocese of Agder og Telemark. The white, wooden church was built in a long church design in 1747 using plans drawn up by an unknown architect. The church seats about 60 people.

== History ==
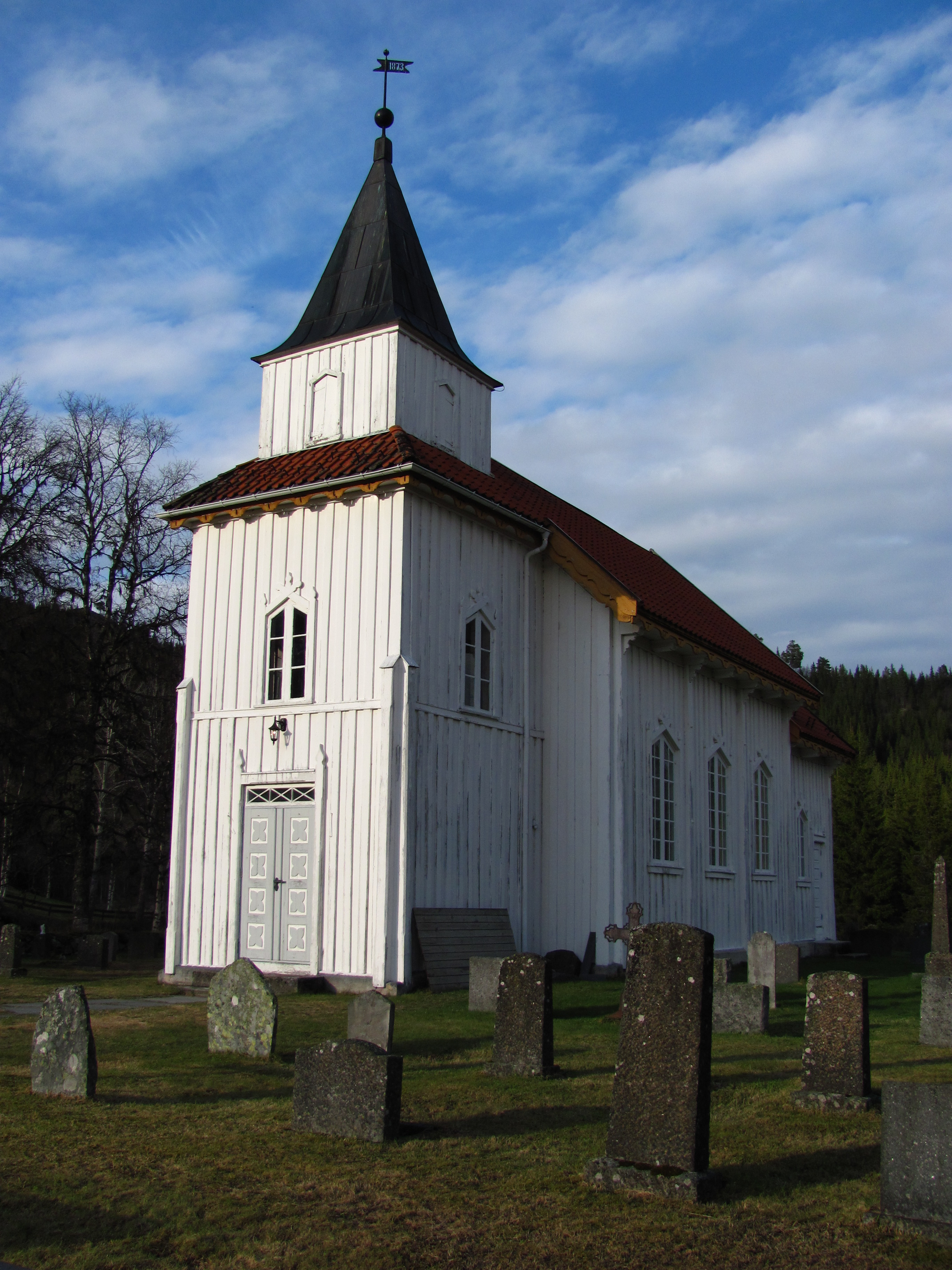
View of the church

The earliest existing historical records of the church date back to the year 1308, but the church was not built that year. The first church at Høydalsmo was a wooden stave church that was likely built during the 13th century. The church building measured about 12 by 6 metres (39 ft × 20 ft). This church was located up the hill about 270 metres (890 ft) to the north of the present church site. There were some renovations carried out on the building in 1663, 1680, 1693, 1699, and 1714.

In 1723, the church was sold into private ownership during the Norwegian church sale when the King sold the churches to pay off debts from the Great Northern War. This church was purchased by Niels Weyer. After a short time, he sold it to Colonel Christian von Koss. Von Koss then sold Høydalsmo Church to Paul Corneliussen Paus in 1733. Some time after purchasing the church, Paus discovered it was in very poor condition. There was so much rot in the structure that the church needed to be replaced. The new church was built in 1747 on a new site down the hill near the river, about 270 metres (890 ft) to the south of the old church site. This site was chosen because it was flatter ground and more room for a graveyard. The new building was a wooden long church with a church porch and tower on the west end of the nave. There was a choir and sacristy on the east end of the nave. The church was consecrated on 18 October 1747. The new church was purchased by the parish from its owner, Paul Paus in 1750 for a low price. After the new church was opened, the old stave church was closed and in 1785, the old stave church was torn down.

The new church apparently fell into disrepair over the next few decades, because by the 1820s there were plans to demolish the church as well as the old and dilapidated old Øyfjell Stave Church in nearby Vinje Municipality and then build one new church to serve both areas. However, nothing came of those plans and in 1833, a new church was built in Øyfjell. Høydalsmo Church continued to fall into disrepair and eventually money was provided to fix up the church. In 1873, Auver Auverssen Flatland (sometimes called "Auver Kyrkjebyggar") was hired to rebuild Høydalsmo Church. During this renovation, the church got a new altar, pulpit, benches, and bell tower in this project. The church's weather vane bears the year 1873 to mark the occasion. In 1936, the church exterior was painted red, but this was not well-liked by the congregation so in 1952 it was painted white once again. The church interior was restored in 1964. In 1986, the church bell fell down due to wear on the suspension, and was damaged. It turned out that the tower was also bad, so it was taken down and rebuilt.

== See also ==
- List of churches in Agder og Telemark
