= Albert Kuchler (skier) =

German cross-country skier (born 1998)

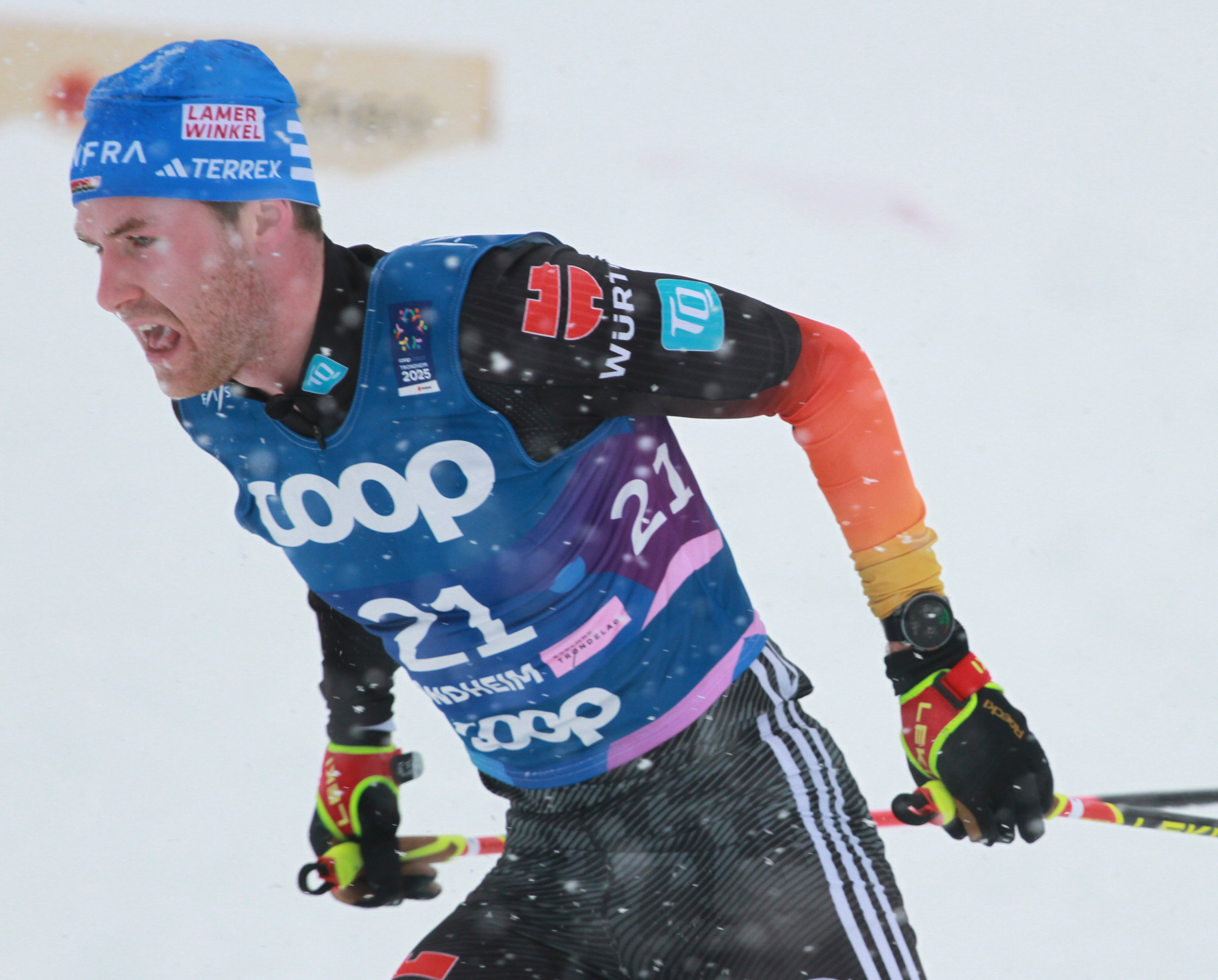

Personal information
- Nationality: Germany
- Born: 30 November 1998 (age 27) Bad Kötzting, Germany
- Height: 1.79 m (5 ft 10 in)

Sport
- Sport: Skiing
- Club: SpVgg Lam

World Cup career
- Seasons: 4 – (2022–present)
- Indiv. starts: 42
- Indiv. podiums: 0
- Team starts: 3
- Team podiums: 2
- Team wins: 0
- Overall titles: 0 – (114th in 2022)
- Discipline titles: 0
Medal record
Men's cross-country skiing
Representing Germany
World Championships
Bronze medal – third place	2023 Planica	4 × 10 km relay
- Updated on 1 March 2025

Albert Kuchler (born November 30, 1998, in Bad Kötzting) is a German cross-country skier who represents the club SpVgg Lam and Germany national team. He participated at 2022 Winter Olympics in Beijing, China. His novel achievement to date is the winning bronze medal in the 4 × 5 km relay event at the 2023 World Champions in Planica, Slovenia.

== Cross-country ski results ==
All results are sourced from the International Ski Federation (FIS).

=== Olympic games ===
Year	Age	15 km individual	30 km skiathlon	50 km mass start	Sprint	4 × 10 km relay	Team sprint
2022	23	32	—	—	—	—	23

=== World Championships ===
- 1 medal – (1 bronze)

Year	Age	15 km individual	30 km skiathlon	50 km mass start	Sprint	4 × 10 km relay	Team sprint
2023	24	—	17	25	—	Bronze	—
2025	26	29	38	—	—	8	—

=== World Cup ===
Season	Age	Discipline standings				Ski Tour standings			
Season	Age	Overall	Distance	Sprint	U23	Nordic Opening	Tour de Ski	Ski Tour 2020	World Cup Final
2021-22	23	114	80	NC	NC	—N/a	—	—N/a	—N/a
2022-23	24	70	37	NC	—N/a	—N/a	DNF	—N/a	—N/a

==== Team podiums ====
- 1 podium – (1 RL)

No.	Season	Date	Location	Race	Level	Place	Teammates
1	2022–23	19 March 2023	Falun, Sweden	4 × 5 km Mixed Relay C/F	World Cup	3rd	Hennig / Sossau / Carl
