= Philipp Orter =

Austrian Nordic combined skier (born 1994)

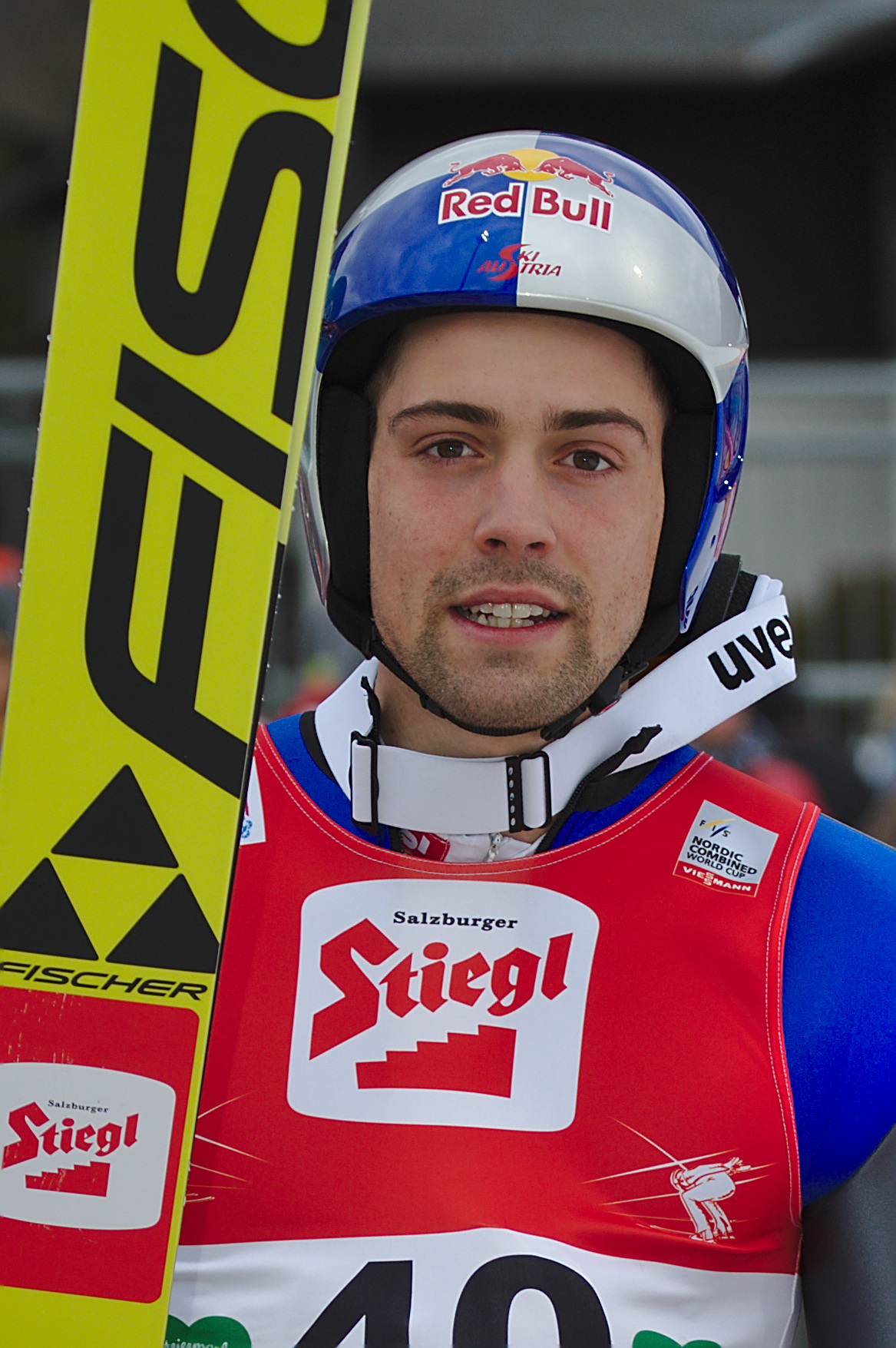

Personal information
- Full name: Philipp Orter
- Born: 16 February 1994 (age 32) Villach, Austria

Sport
- Sport: Skiing
- Club: SV Villach-Kaernten
Medal record
World Championships
Bronze medal – third place	2017 Lahti	4 x 5 km team

Philipp Orter (born 16 February 1994) is an Austrian Nordic combined skier. He competed in the World Cup 2015 season.

He represented Austria at the FIS Nordic World Ski Championships 2015 in Falun.
