= Simen Tiller =

Norwegian Nordic combined skier (born 1995)

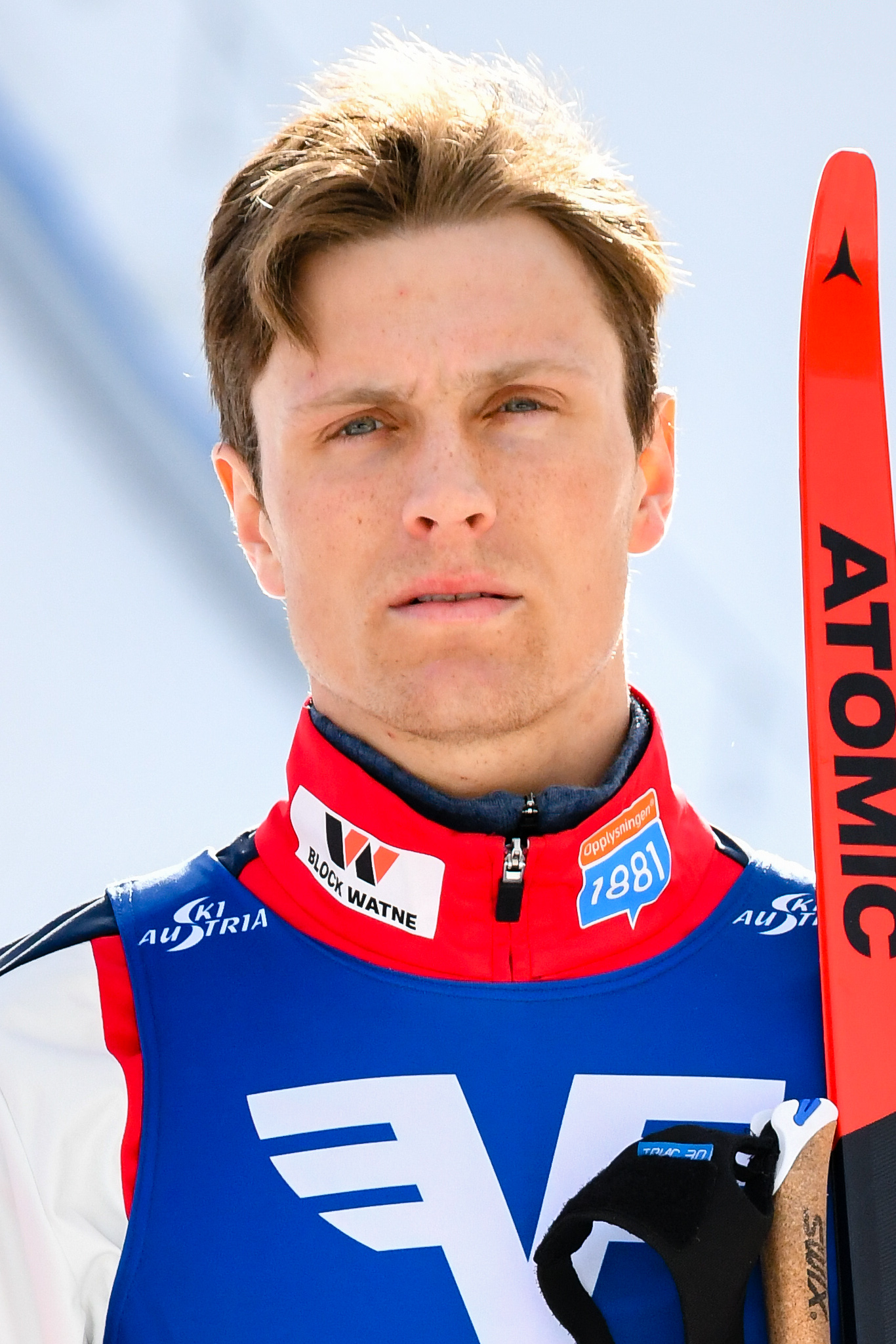

Personal information
- Nationality: Norway
- Born: 26 November 1995 (age 30) Lillehammer, Norway

Sport
- Sport: Skiing
- Club: Moelven IL

World Cup career
- Seasons: 2017–2026
- Indiv. starts: 71
Medal record
Men's Nordic combined
Representing Norway
World Championships
Silver medal – second place	2025 Trondheim	Team LH

Simen Tiller (born 26 November 1995) is a Norwegian former Nordic combined skier.

He competed at the 2011 European Youth Winter Olympic Festival as well as the 2012, 2013 and 2015 Junior World Championships. At the latter competition he won a bronze medal in the relay. He made his Continental Cup debut in January 2012 in Høydalsmo. Competing regularly over the next years, he recorded his first victory in February 2020 in Eisenerz.

He made his World Cup debut in March 2017 in Holmenkollen. He collected his first World Cup points in December 2019 in Lillehammer, also collecting points in two more races on the 2019–20 circuit.

He represented the sports club Moelven IL.
