= Einar Lurås Oftebro =

Norwegian Nordic combined skier

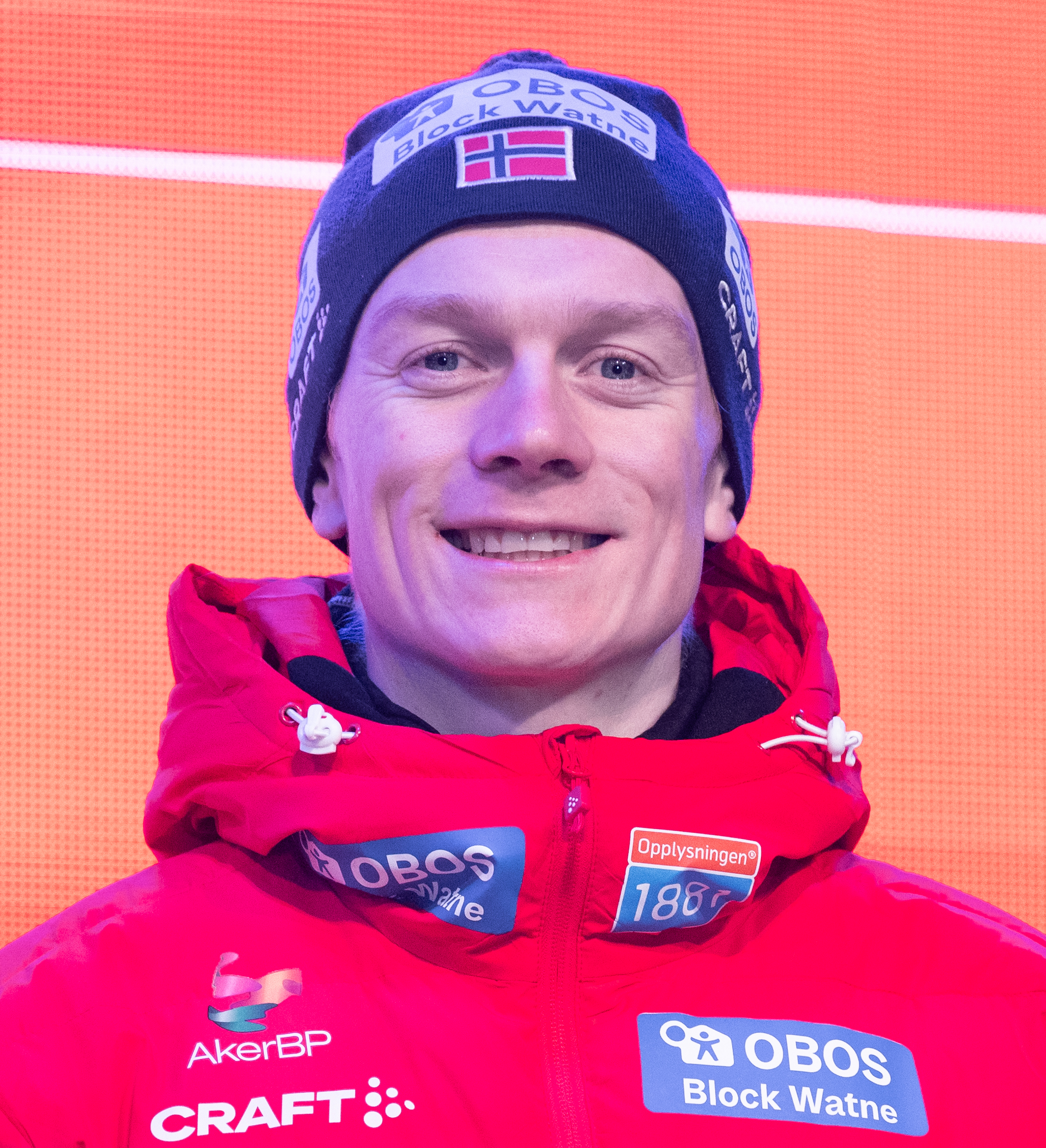
- Oftebro in 2026

Personal information
- Full name: Einar Christian Lurås Oftebro
- Born: 6 August 1998 (age 27) Bærum, Norway

Sport
- Sport: Skiing
- Club: IL Jardar

Einar Christian Lurås Oftebro (born 6 August 1998) is a Norwegian Nordic combined skier.

== Career ==
Oftebro competed at the 2015 European Youth Olympic Winter Festival and the 2016 Winter Youth Olympics. He competed in three events at both the 2016, 2017 and 2018 Junior World Championships. At the latter he took the silver medal in the 10 kilometres event and won a bronze medal in the relay.

He made his Continental Cup debut in January 2016 in Høydalsmo, then broke the top 30-barrier in December 2016 (Klingenthal, 26th), the top-20 barrier in January 2017 (Høydalsmo, 20th) and the top-10 barrier in January 2018 (Rena, 7th). He then made his World Cup debut in March 2018 with a 40th place in Lahti.

He represents the sports club IL Jardar. He is an older brother of Jens Lurås Oftebro.
