= Cindy Haasch =

German Nordic combined skier (born 2004)

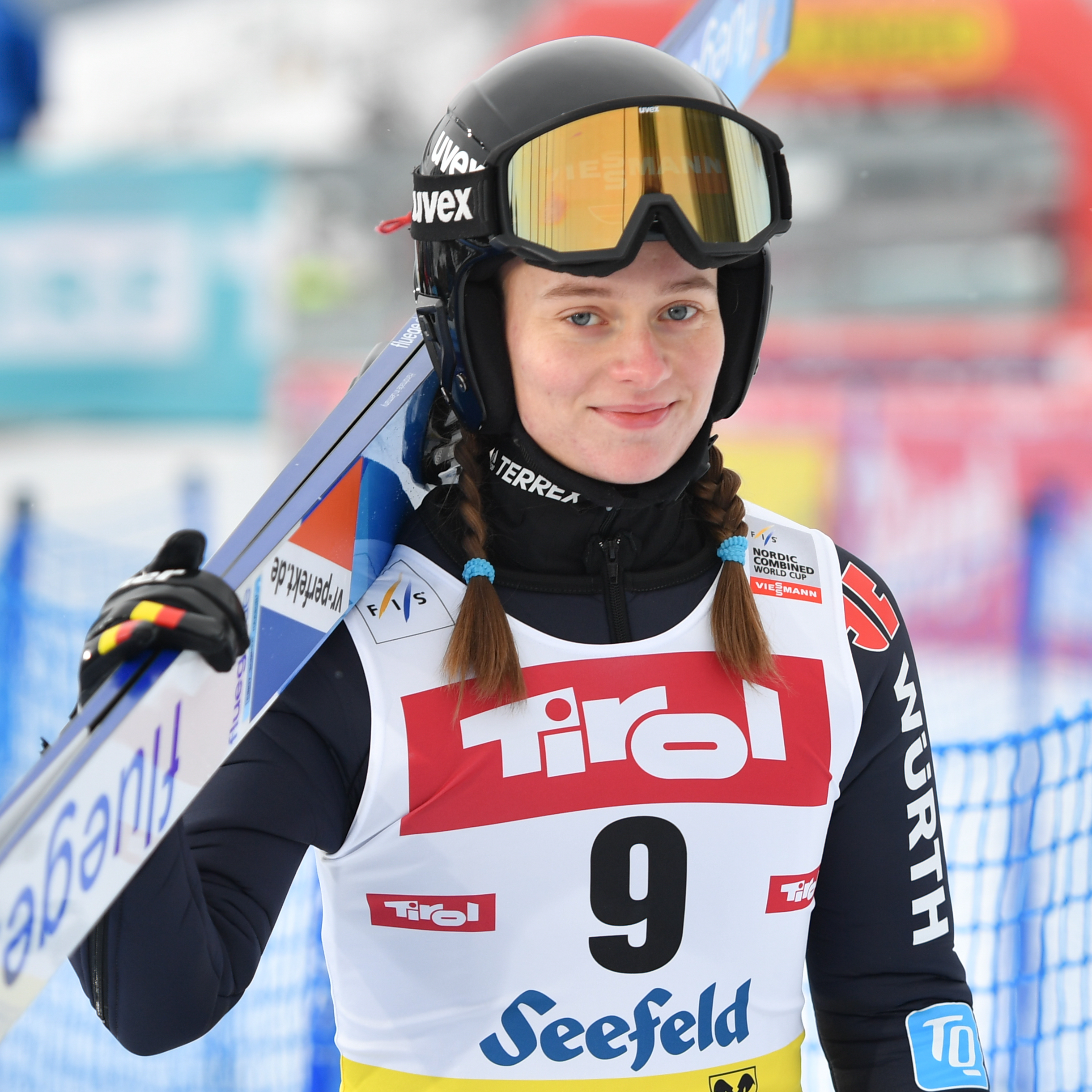

Personal information
- Nationality: Germany
- Born: 19 August 2004 (age 22)
- Height: 1.65 m (5 ft 5 in)

Sport
- Sport: Skiing
- Club: TSG Ruhla
Medal record
Women's Nordic combined
Representing Germany
World Junior Championships
Silver medal – second place	2023 Whistler	Mixed team NH

Cindy Haasch (born 19 August 2004) is a German Nordic combined skier.

She participated at the individual event at the FIS Nordic World Ski Championships 2021.
