= Lårdal Church =

Church in Telemark, Norway

- Lårdal kyrkje
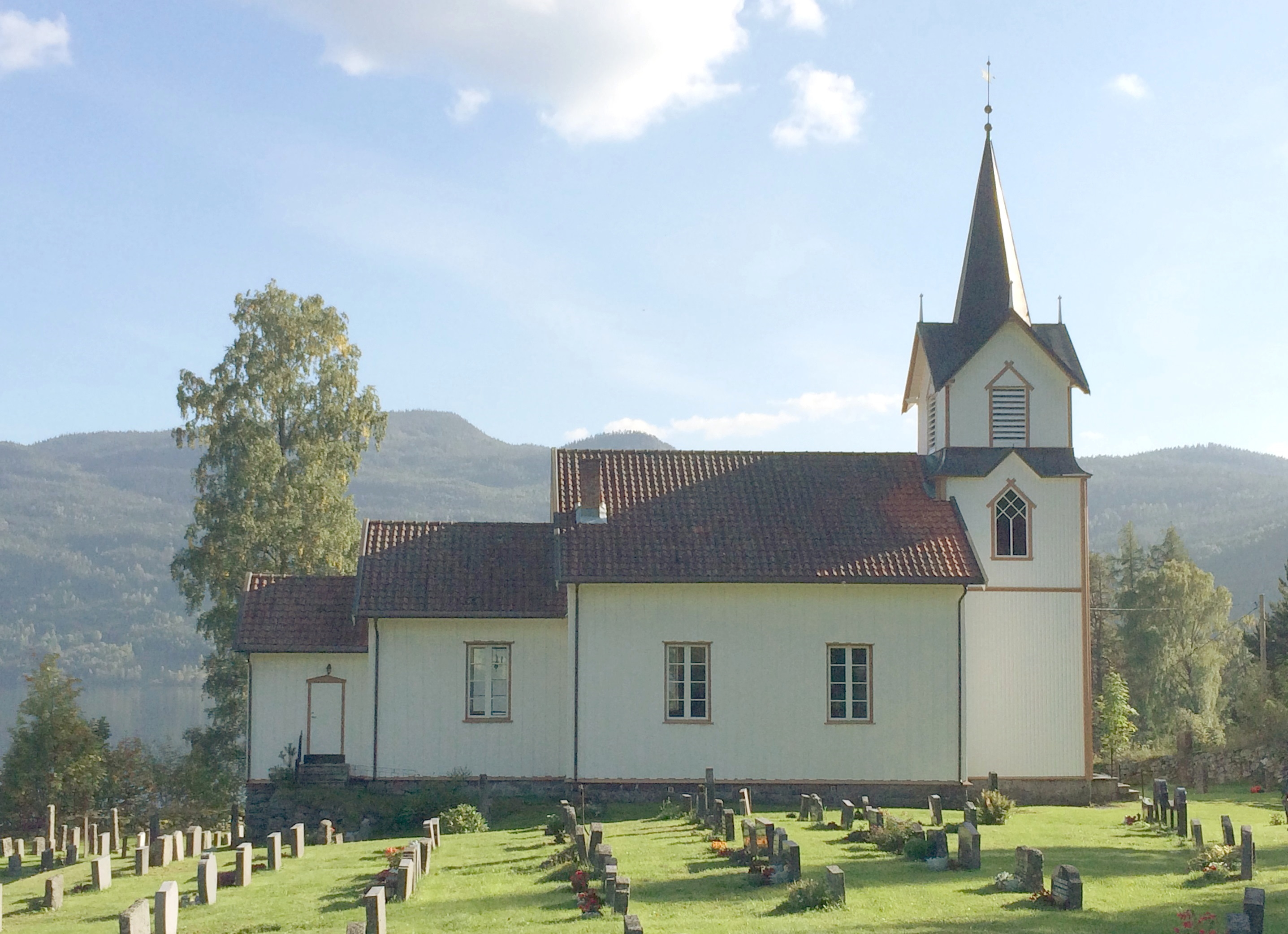
- View of the church
- Lårdal Church
- 59°25′27″N 8°10′57″E
- Location: Tokke Municipality, Telemark
- Country: Norway
- Denomination: Church of Norway
- Previous denomination: Catholic Church
- Churchmanship: Evangelical Lutheran

History
- Status: Parish church
- Founded: c. 13th century
- Consecrated: 1831

Architecture
- Functional status: Active
- Architect: Hans Linstow
- Architectural type: Long church
- Completed: 1831 (195 years ago)

Specifications
- Capacity: 120
- Materials: Wood

Administration
- Diocese: Agder og Telemark
- Deanery: Øvre Telemark prosti
- Parish: Høydalsmo og Lårdal
- Norwegian Cultural Heritage Site
- Type: Church
- Status: Automatically protected
- ID: 84371

Lårdal Church (Norwegian: Lårdal kyrkje) is a parish church of the Church of Norway in Tokke Municipality in Telemark county, Norway. It is located in the village of Lårdal. It is one of the churches for the Høydalsmo og Lårdal parish which is part of the Øvre Telemark prosti (deanery) in the Diocese of Agder og Telemark. The white, wooden church was built in a long church design in 1831 using plans drawn up by the architect Hans Linstow. The church seats about 120 people.

== History ==
The earliest existing historical records of the church date back to the year 1396, but the church was not built that year. The first church in Lårdal was a wooden stave church that was likely built during the 1200s. The old stave church was located at Eik, about 175 metres (574 ft) to the southwest of the present church site. By the mid-1600s, the church had fallen into disrepair. In 1662 the roof was reported to be very poor condition. The reports of concern were repeated again in a report from 1668 after the necessary repairs had not been carried out. In 1684, that church was torn down and replaced with a new church on the same site. In 1723, the church was sold into private ownership during the Norwegian church sale when the King sold the churches to pay off debts from the Great Northern War.

In 1814, this church served as an election church (Norwegian: valgkirke). Together with more than 300 other parish churches across Norway, it was a polling station for elections to the 1814 Norwegian Constituent Assembly which wrote the Constitution of Norway. This was Norway's first national elections. Each church parish was a constituency that elected people called "electors" who later met together in each county to elect the representatives for the assembly that was to meet at Eidsvoll Manor later that year.

In 1831, the fourth private owner tore down the old church and had a new church built on a new site, about 175 metres (574 ft) to the northeast of the old site. The new church was a wooden long church that was designed by Hans Linstow. In 1865 the church was gifted to the congregation so it would no longer be privately owned. In 1887, a sacristy was added to the east end of the church.

== See also ==
- List of churches in Agder og Telemark
