= Terence Weber =

German Nordic combined skier

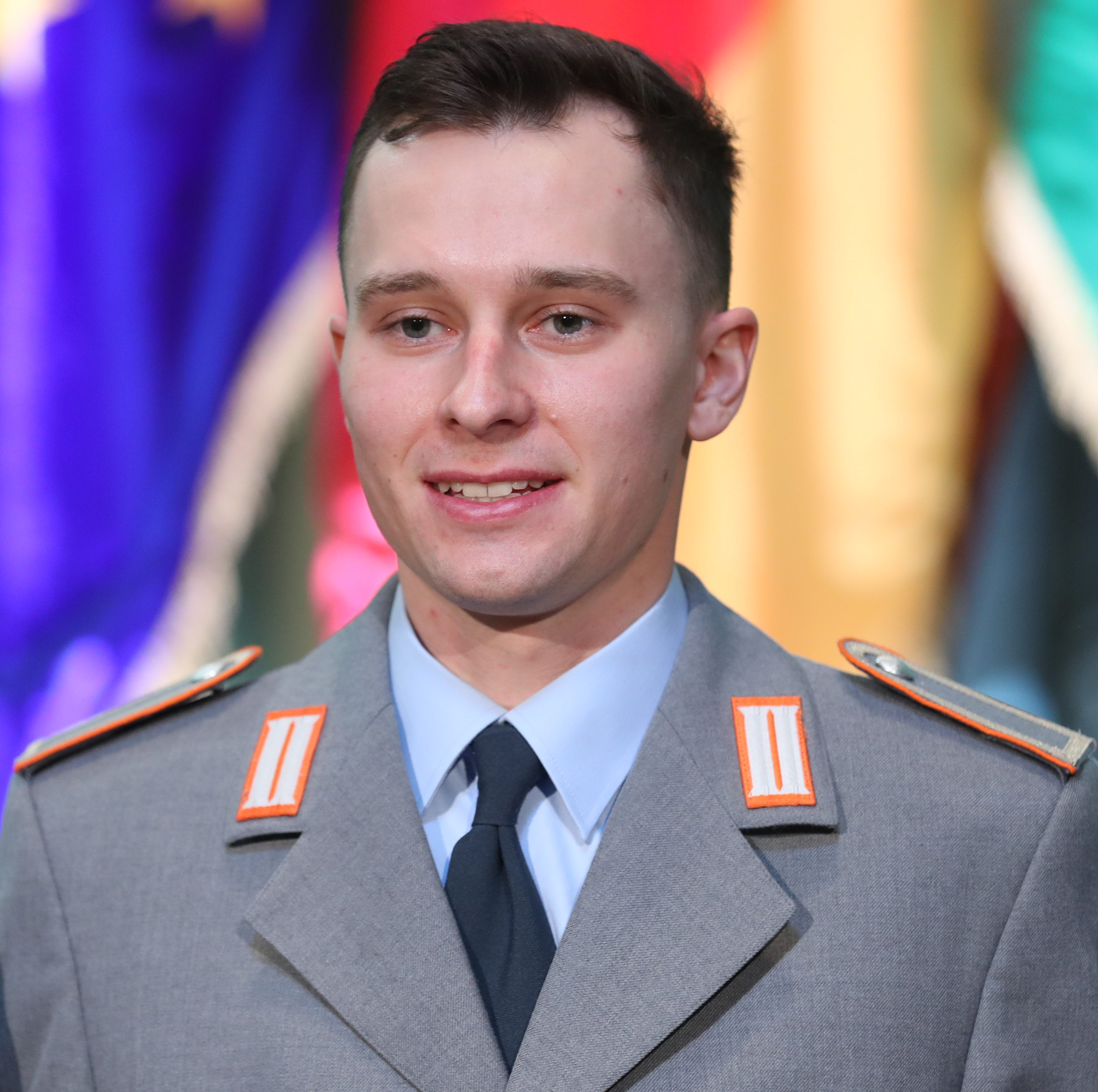
- Weber in 2022

Personal information
- Nationality: Germany
- Born: 24 September 1996 (age 29) Geyer, Germany
- Height: 1.83 m (6 ft 0 in)

Sport
- Sport: Skiing
- Club: SSV Geyer

World Cup career
- Seasons: 2016–
- Indiv. starts: 136
- Indiv. podiums: 1
- Indiv. wins: 1
- Team podiums: 3
- Team wins: 0

Achievements and titles
- Personal bests: 214.0 m (702.1 ft); Oberstdorf, 17 March 2022
Medal record
World Championships
Silver medal – second place	2021 Oberstdorf	Team NH

Terence Weber (born 24 September 1996) is a German Nordic combined skier.

He participated at the FIS Nordic World Ski Championships 2019.

== World Championship ==
Year	Individual LH	Individual NH	Team NH	Team sprint
2019	—	25	—	—
2021	—	—	Silver	—

== World Cup ==
=== Individual victories ===
No.	Season	Date	Location	Discipline
1	2021/22	27 November 2021	(Finland) Ruka	HS142 / 10 km
