= Andreas Skoglund =

Norwegian Nordic combined skier

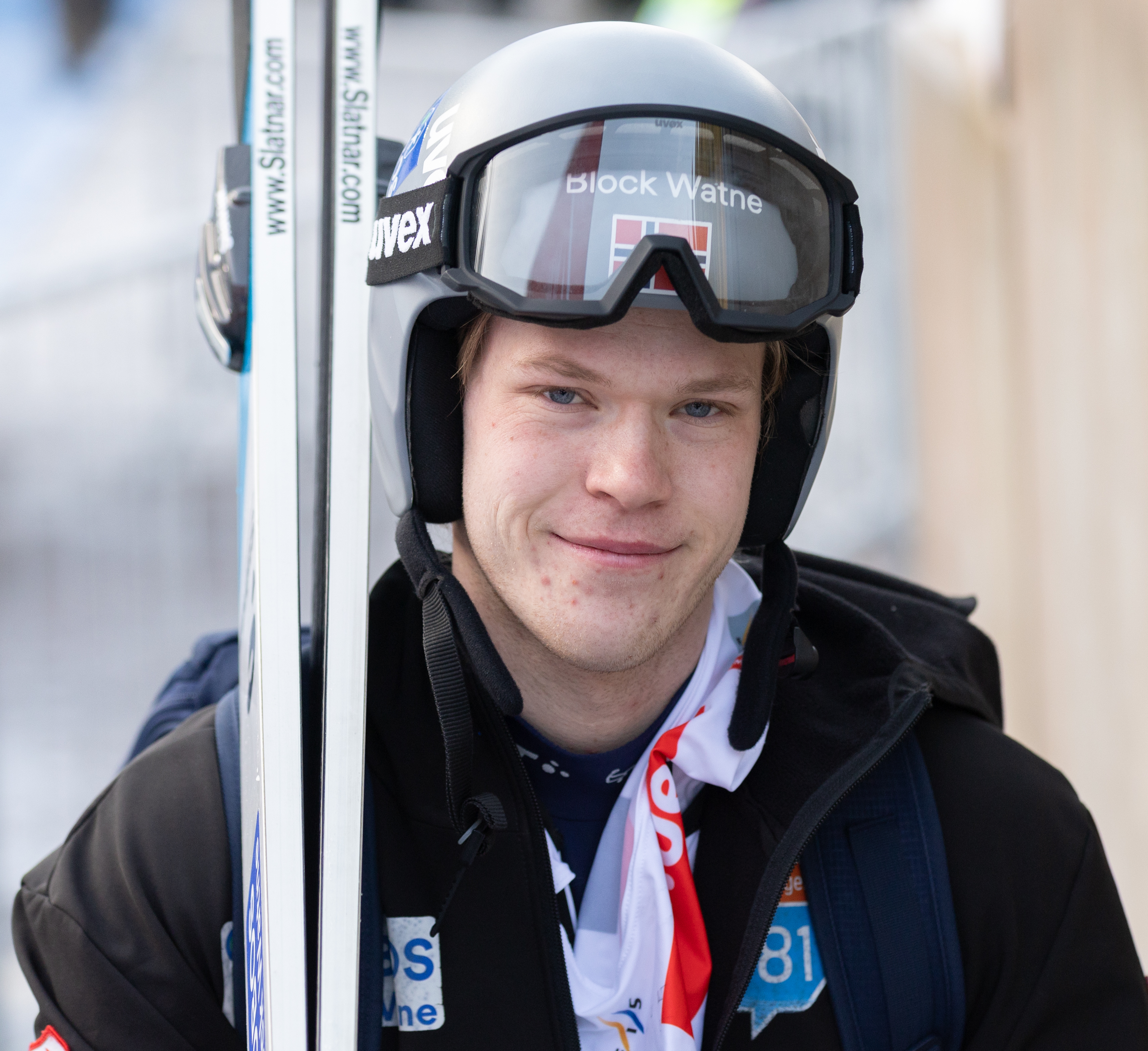
- Skoglund in 2026

Personal information
- Born: 22 March 2001 (age 25)

Sport
- Sport: Skiing
Medal record
Men's Nordic combined
Representing Norway
Olympic Games
Gold medal – first place	2026 Milano Cortina	Team LH
- Updated on 19 February 2026

Andreas Skoglund (born 22 March 2001) is a Norwegian Nordic combined skier. At the 2026 Winter Olympics, he won a gold medal in the team large hill.

== Career ==
The Trondheim based athlete competed at the 2018 and 2019 World Junior Championships. In 2018 he won a bronze medal in the team event, whereas in 2019 he won the bronze medal in the 10 kilometre race and a silver medal in the team event.

Skoglund made his FIS Nordic Combined World Cup debut in March 2019 in Holmenkollen, placing 37th. He collected his first World Cup points in December 2019 in Lillehammer with a 28th and a 16th place.

Skoglund represents the sports club Molde og Omegn IF.

== Personal life ==
His brother Aleksander Skoglund is also a competitive skier.

== Nordic combined results ==
- All results are sourced from FIS.

=== Olympic Games ===
- 1 medal – (1 gold)

Year	Individual NH	Individual LH	Team LH
2026	7	4	Gold
