= Jakob Lange =

Danish architect

- Born: 1 May 1978 (age 48); Odense, Denmark
- Occupation: Architect
- Practice: Bjarke Ingels Group

Jakob Lange is currently one of 23 partners at Danish architectural company Bjarke Ingels Group.

Lange is a board member at the American transportation company Virgin Hyperloop.
