= Kasper Moen Flatla =

Norwegian Nordic combined skier (born 1999)

Kasper Moen Flatla (born 22 February 1999) is a Norwegian Nordic combined skier.

He competed at the 2017, 2018 and 2019 World Junior Championships. In the latter event he placed 9th individually and won a silver medal in the team event.

He made his FIS Nordic Combined World Cup debut in December 2019 in Lillehammer, collecting his first World Cup points with a 19th and a 22nd place.

He represents the sports club IL Jardar.
