= Wendelin Thannheimer =

German Nordic combined skier (born 1999)

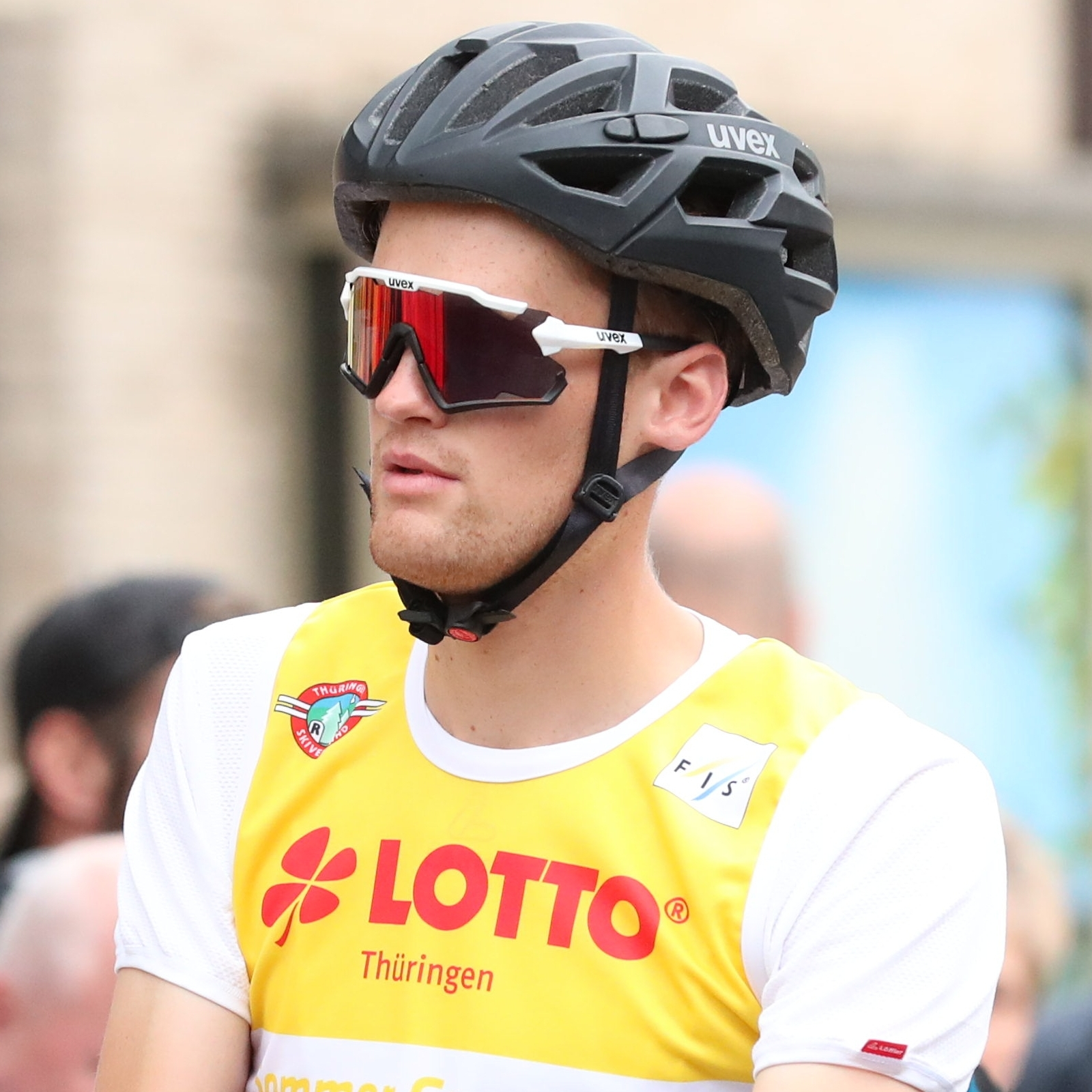
- Thannheimer in 2021

Personal information
- Nationality: Germany
- Born: 25 November 1999 (age 26)

Sport
- Sport: Skiing

World Cup career
- Seasons: 7 – (2018–present)
- Indiv. starts: 71
- Indiv. podiums: 1
Medal record
Men's Nordic combined
Representing Germany
World Championships
Gold medal – first place	2025 Trondheim	Team LH
- Updated on 31 January 2026

Wendelin Thannheimer (born 25 November 1999) is a German Nordic combined skier.

== Career ==
Thannheimer represented Germany at the FIS Nordic World Ski Championships 2025 and won a gold medal in the team large hill event.

During the 2025–26 FIS Nordic Combined World Cup, he earned his first career World Cup podium on 6 December 2025, finishing in second place.
