= Høydalsmo =

Village in Tokke Municipality, Norway

- Village
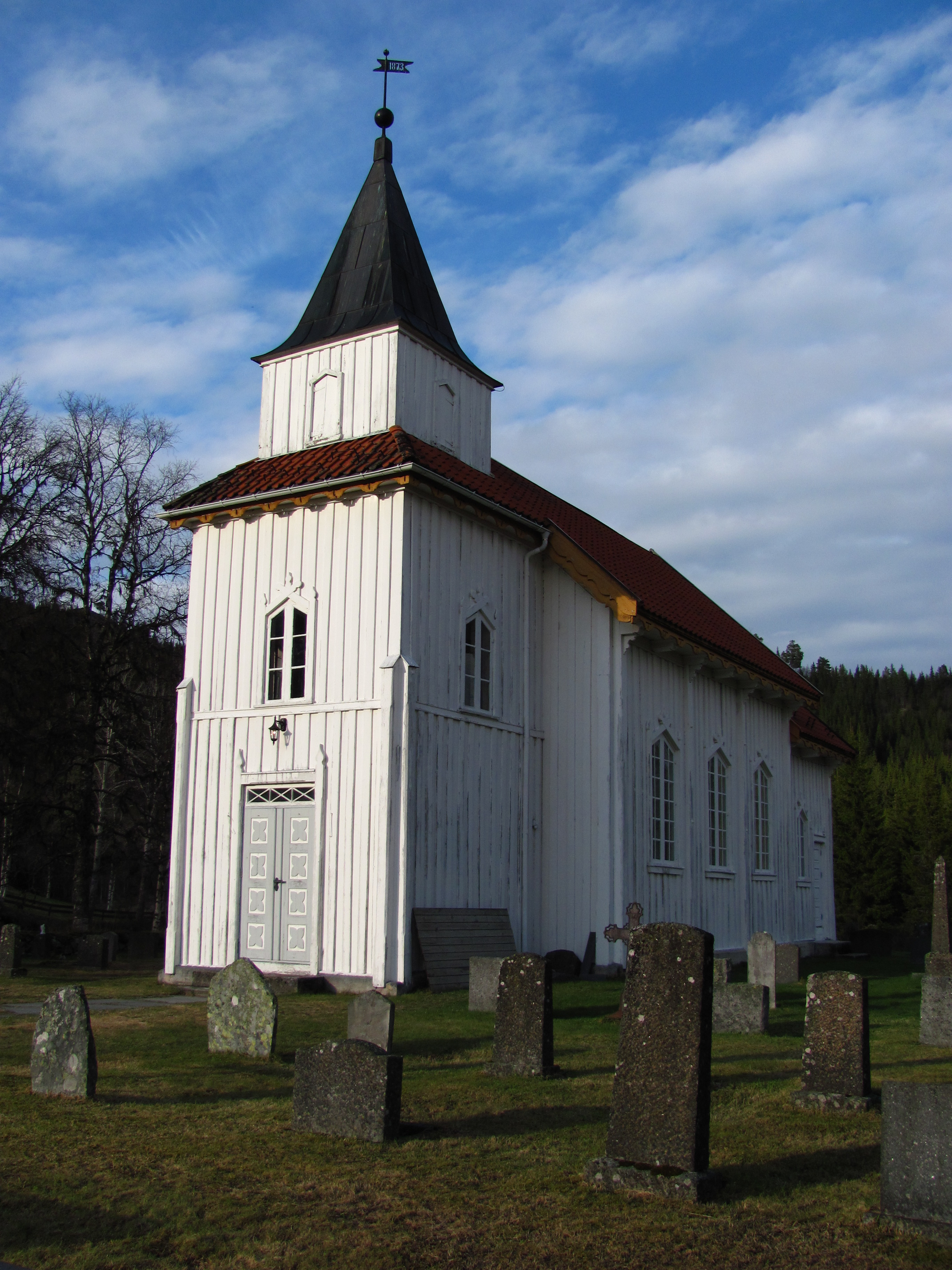
- View of the village church
- Interactive map of Høydalsmo
- Coordinates: 59.49936°N 8.19742°E
- Country: Norway
- Region: Eastern Norway
- County: Telemark
- District: Vest-Telemark
- Municipality: Tokke Municipality
- Elevation: 560 m (1,840 ft)
- Time zone: UTC+01:00 (CET)
  - Summer (DST): UTC+02:00 (CEST)
- Post Code: 3891 Høydalsmo

Høydalsmo is a village in Tokke Municipality in Telemark county, Norway. The village is located along the north shore of the lake Oftevant in the northeastern part of the municipality. The European route E134 highway runs through the village. The village area has about 300 permanent residents. The village of Dalen lies about 15 kilometres (9.3 mi) to the southwest and the village of Åmot (in Vinje Municipality) lies about 15 kilometres (9.3 mi) to the northwest.

Høydalsmo is known for its skiing facilities. Høydalsmo hosted the Norwegian cross-country skiing championships in 2002.

The Høydalsmo Church lies about 2 kilometres (1.2 mi) to the east of the village centre. It was built in 1785, replacing a medieval stave church on the same site.

The wrestler Grom Gravalid (known as Gromguten) hails from Høydalsmo.

== Climate ==
Climate data for Høydalsmo II 1991–2020 (560 m, avg high/low 2007-2025)
Month	Jan	Feb	Mar	Apr	May	Jun	Jul	Aug	Sep	Oct	Nov	Dec	Year
Mean daily maximum °C (°F)	−2 (28)	0.2 (32.4)	4.1 (39.4)	8.3 (46.9)	13.6 (56.5)	17.9 (64.2)	19.4 (66.9)	17.5 (63.5)	13.8 (56.8)	8.1 (46.6)	2.6 (36.7)	−1.6 (29.1)	8.5 (47.3)
Daily mean °C (°F)	−5.8 (21.6)	−5.4 (22.3)	−2.5 (27.5)	2 (36)	7 (45)	11.2 (52.2)	13.5 (56.3)	12.2 (54.0)	8.4 (47.1)	3.1 (37.6)	−1.4 (29.5)	−5.5 (22.1)	3.1 (37.6)
Mean daily minimum °C (°F)	−11 (12)	−10.5 (13.1)	−7.4 (18.7)	−3 (27)	1.6 (34.9)	6 (43)	8.3 (46.9)	7.1 (44.8)	4.4 (39.9)	−0.2 (31.6)	−4.6 (23.7)	−9.9 (14.2)	−1.6 (29.1)
Average precipitation mm (inches)	85 (3.3)	54 (2.1)	53 (2.1)	51 (2.0)	69 (2.7)	85 (3.3)	104 (4.1)	107 (4.2)	97 (3.8)	107 (4.2)	92 (3.6)	79 (3.1)	983 (38.5)
Source 1: yr.no
Source 2: Seklima (avg highs/lows)
