= U.S. Army World Class Athlete Program =

- World Class Athlete Program
- Active: 1997 – present
- Country: United States of America
- Allegiance: United States
- Branch: United States Army
- Part of: Department of Defense Department of the Army; Installation Management Command Family and Morale, Welfare and Recreation Command
- Location: Fort Carson, Colorado
- Nickname: WCAP

Commanders
- Commander: Cpt. Robert Cheseret
- First Sergeant: 1st Sgt. Jose Santiago

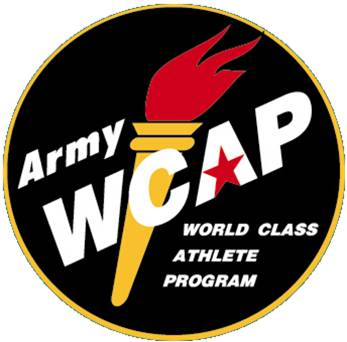
Old Logo

The U.S. Army World Class Athlete Program (WCAP) is a military unit whose primary mission is to support nationally and internationally ranked soldiers in participating on the U.S. Olympic team. The program is headquartered at Fort Carson, Colorado.

== Objectives ==
According to the U.S. Army, WCAP provides active duty, National Guard and reserve soldiers the opportunity to train and compete at national and international sports competitions with the ultimate goal of selection to the U.S. Olympic team and U.S. Paralympic team, while maintaining a professional military career and promoting the U.S. Army.

== Selection ==
Any soldier-athlete (Active Duty, National Guard, Reserve) may apply for selection provided:

- Soldier is in good military standing
- The sport the soldier is applying for is an Olympic sport
- Soldier has completed Advanced Individual Training (enlisted) or Officer Basic Course (officer)
- Soldier meets sport specific entry standards, which normally consists of attaining a high national ranking or being selected to a U.S. National Team for international competition
- WCAP is not a developmental program; it targets athletes who have achieved world class status in their sport
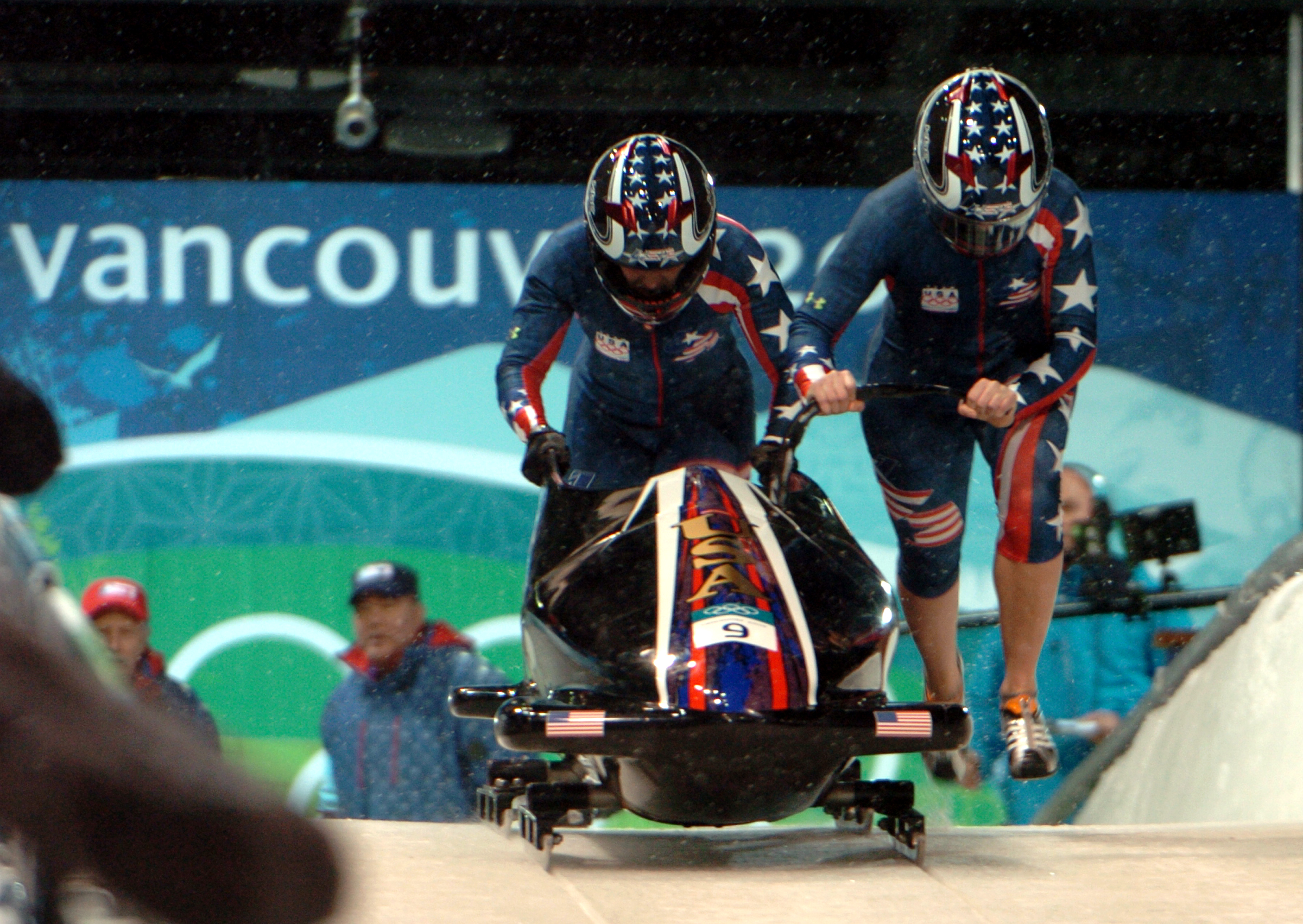
Army National Guard Outstanding Athlete Program, 2010 Winter Olympics.

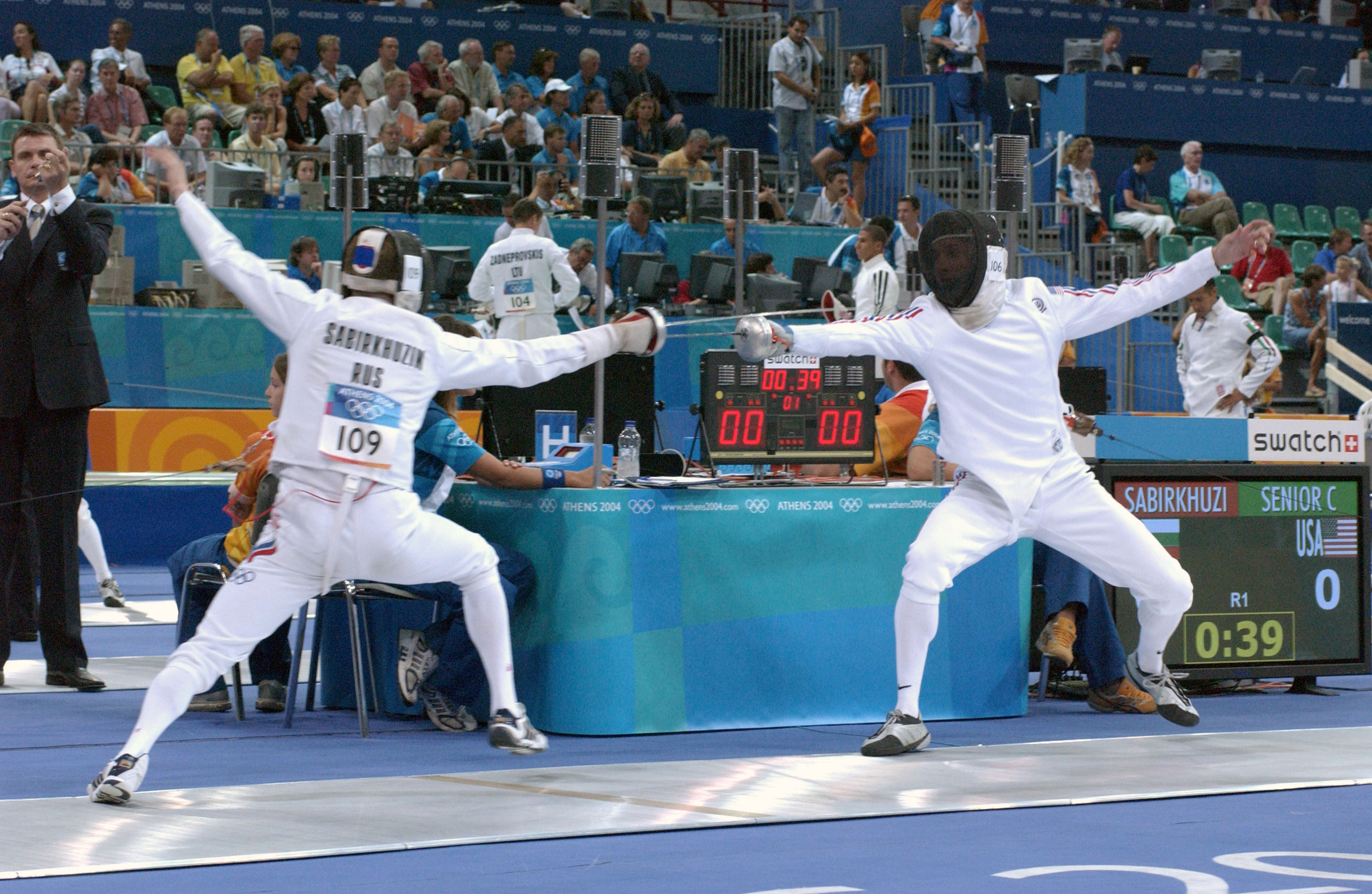
U.S. Army's World Class Athlete Program, 2004 Summer Olympics.

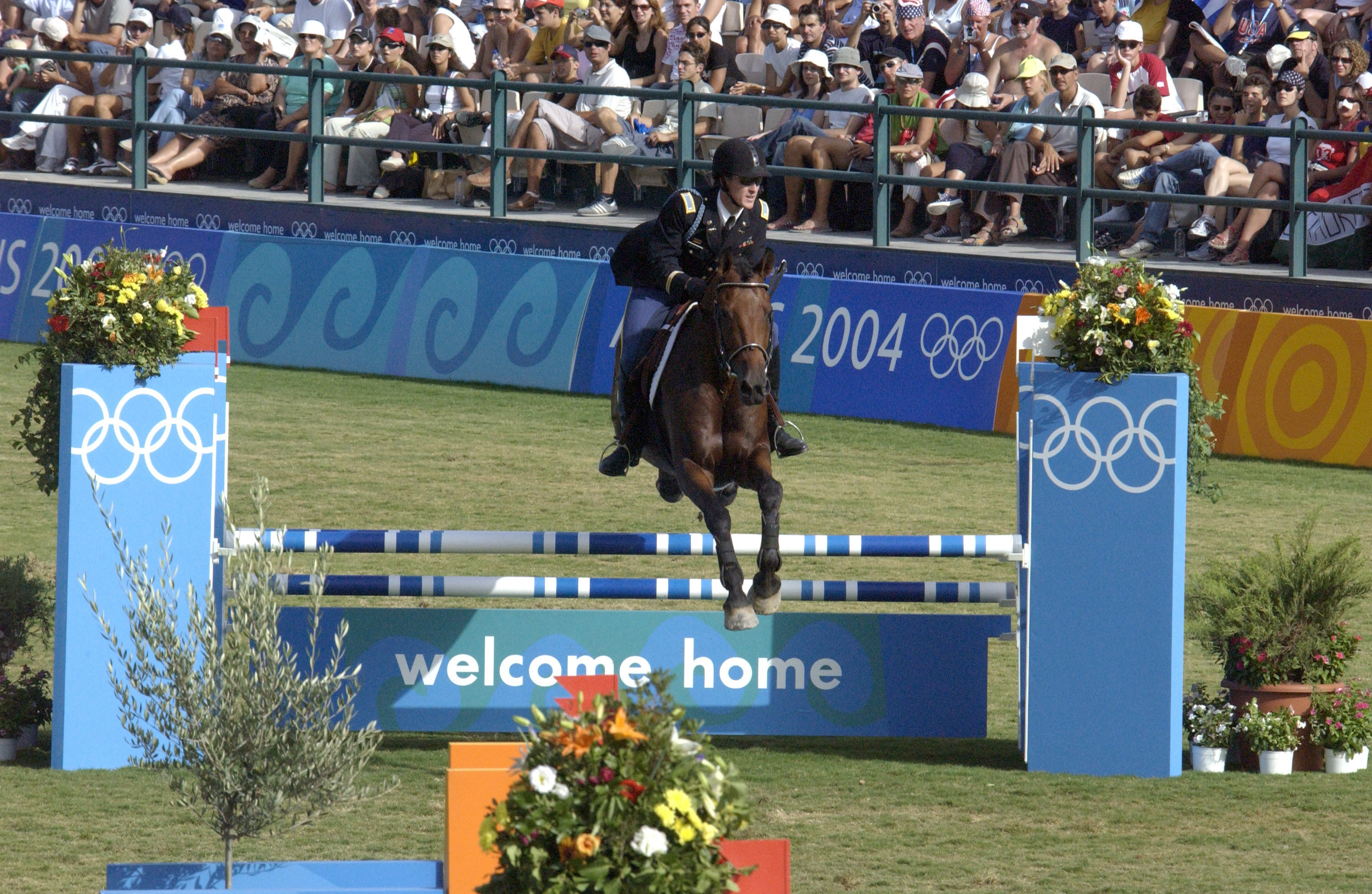
U.S. Army's World Class Athlete Program, 2004 Summer Olympics.

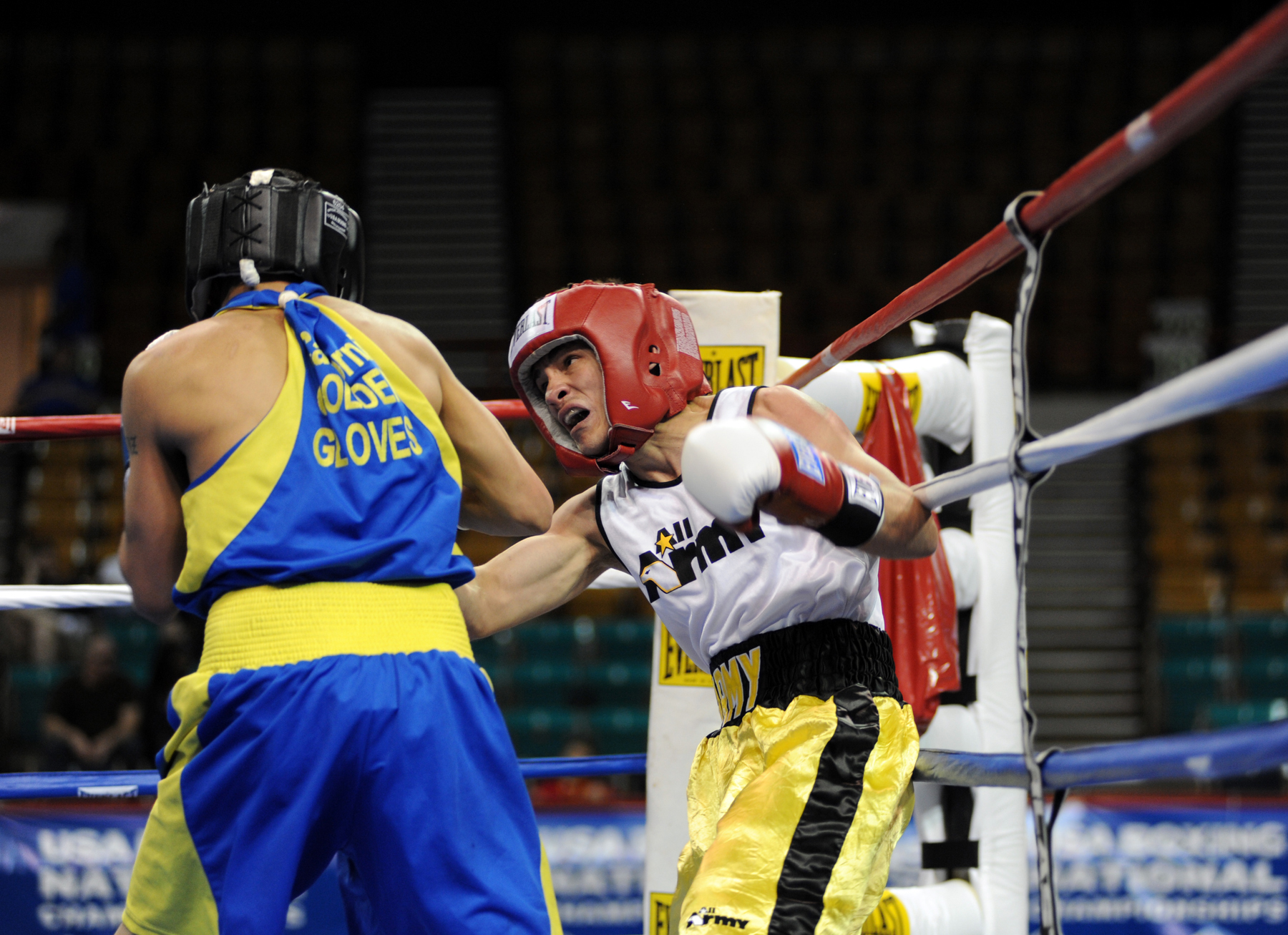
2009 U.S. National Boxing Championships.

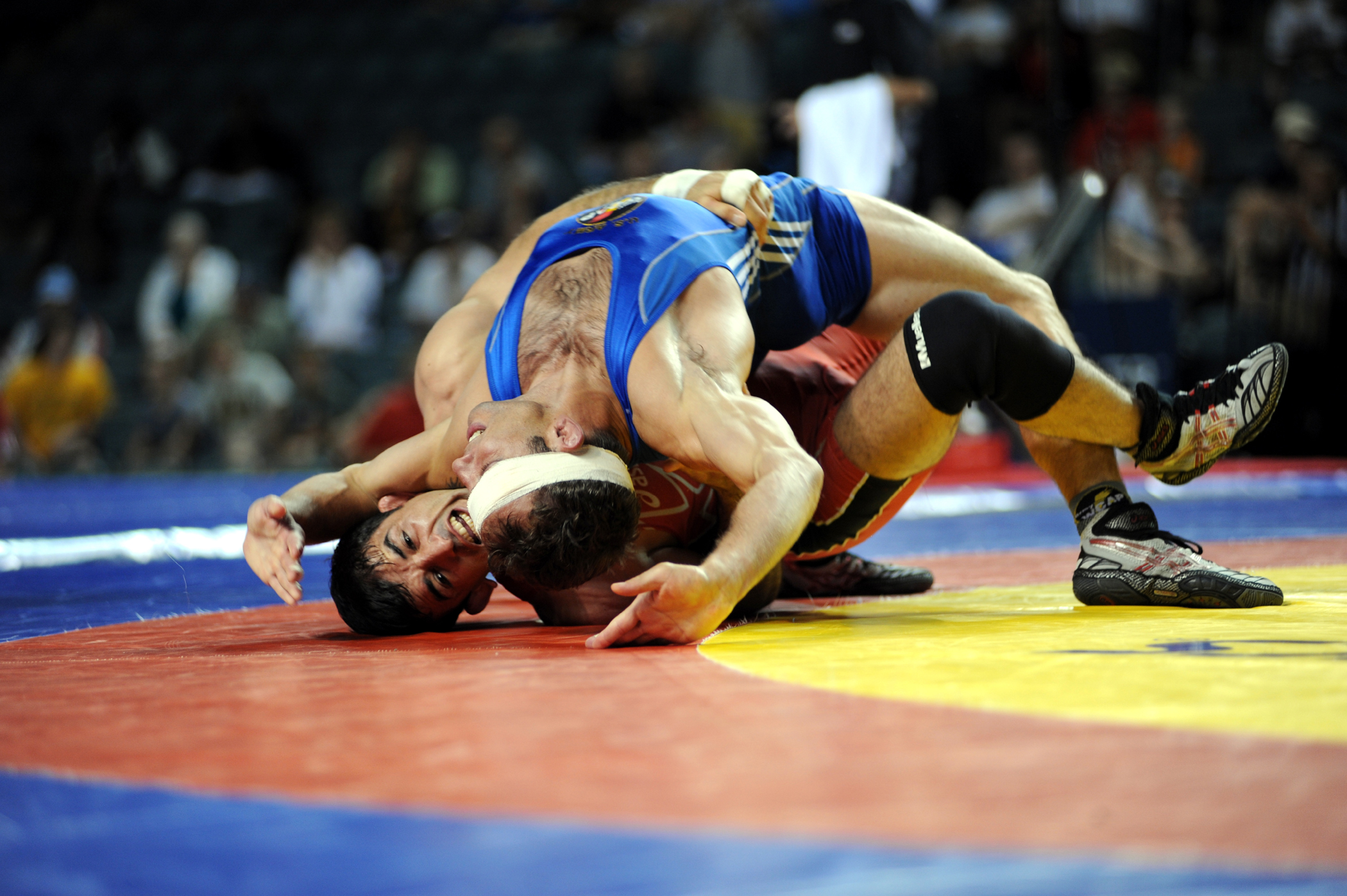
Army World Class Athlete Program, 2010 World Team Trials for USA Wrestling.

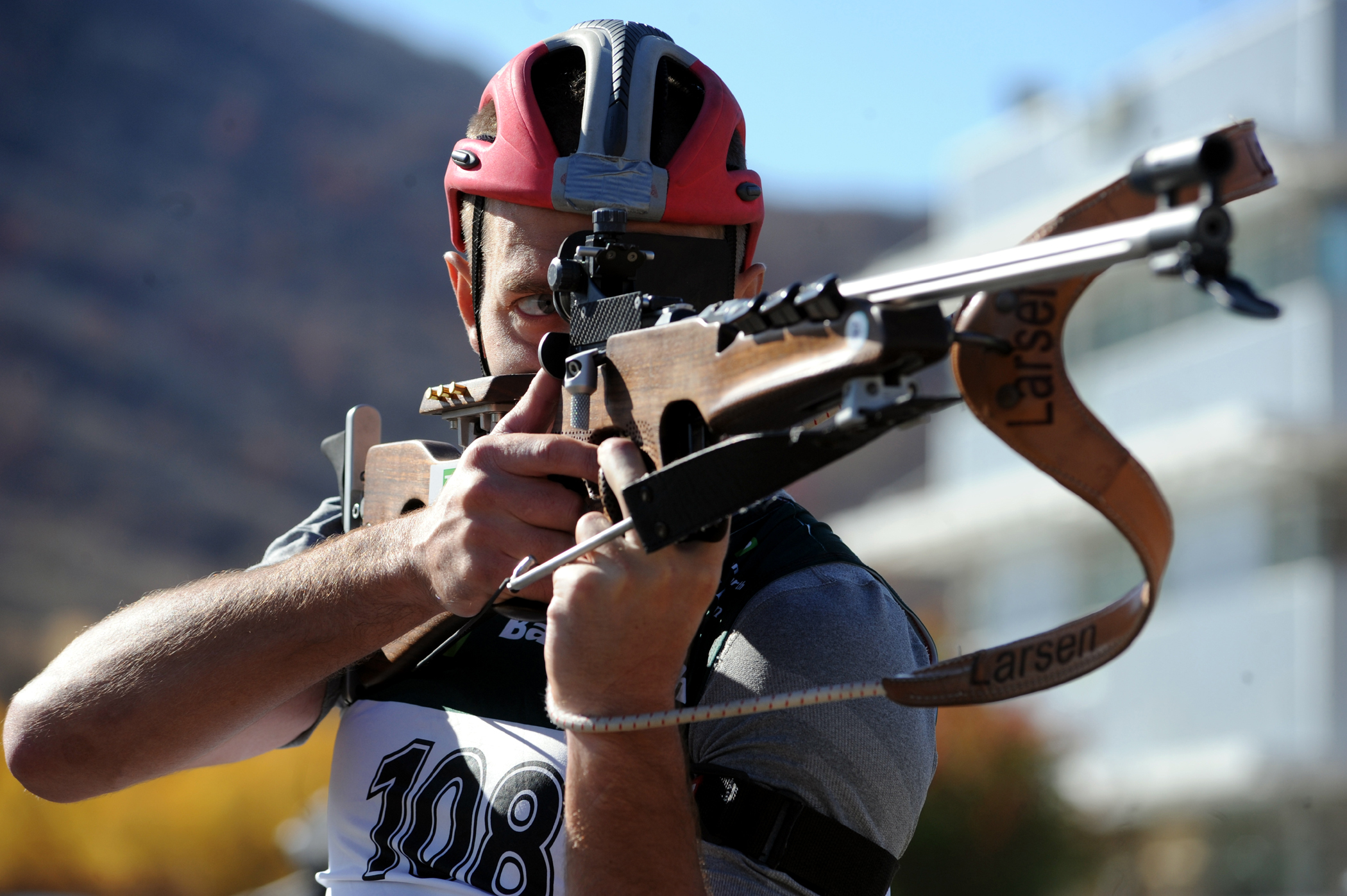
Army World Class Athlete Program Olympic biathlete Jeremy Teela practicing.

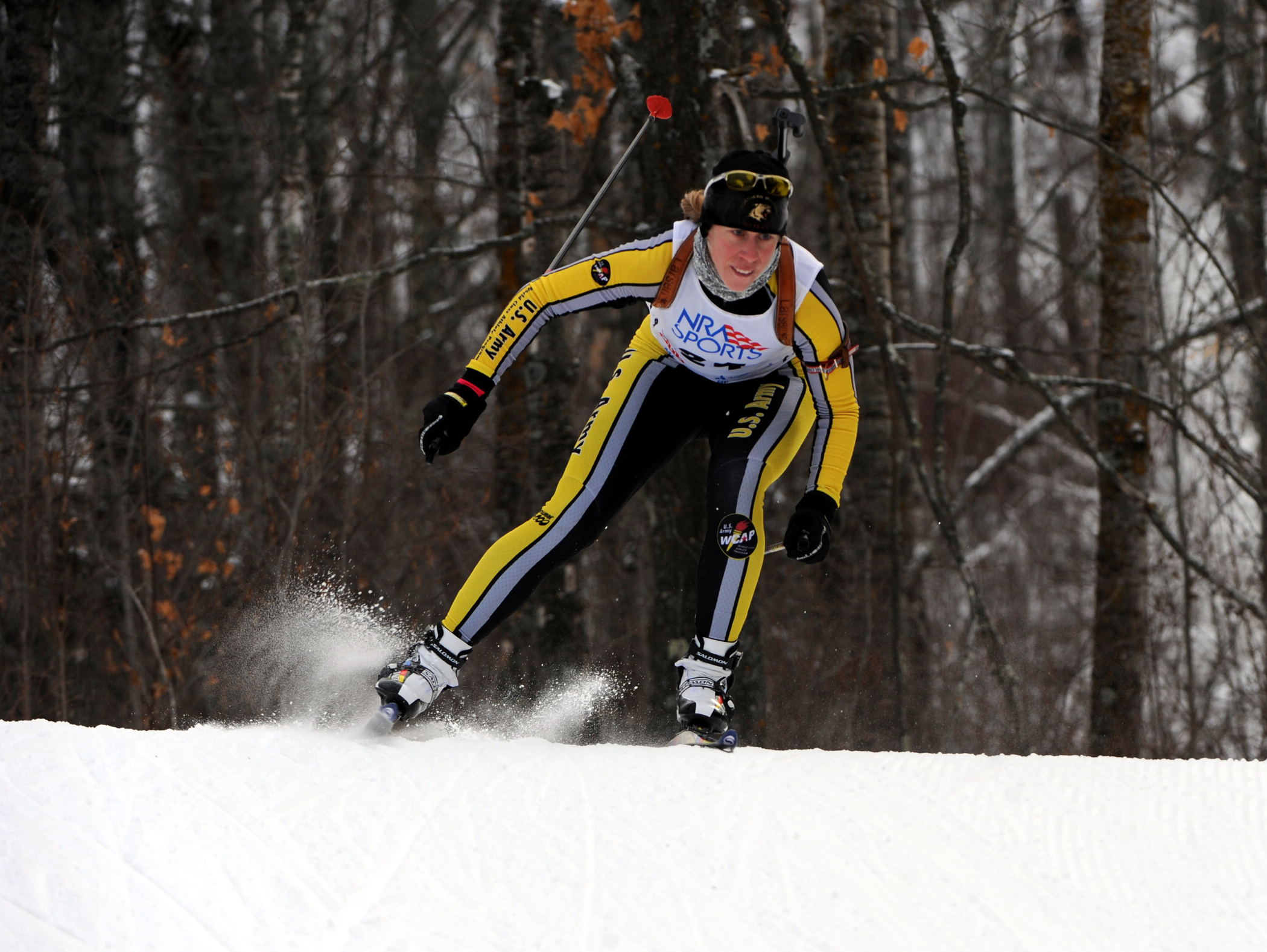
U.S. Biathlon World Team Trials in Coleraine, Minnesota.

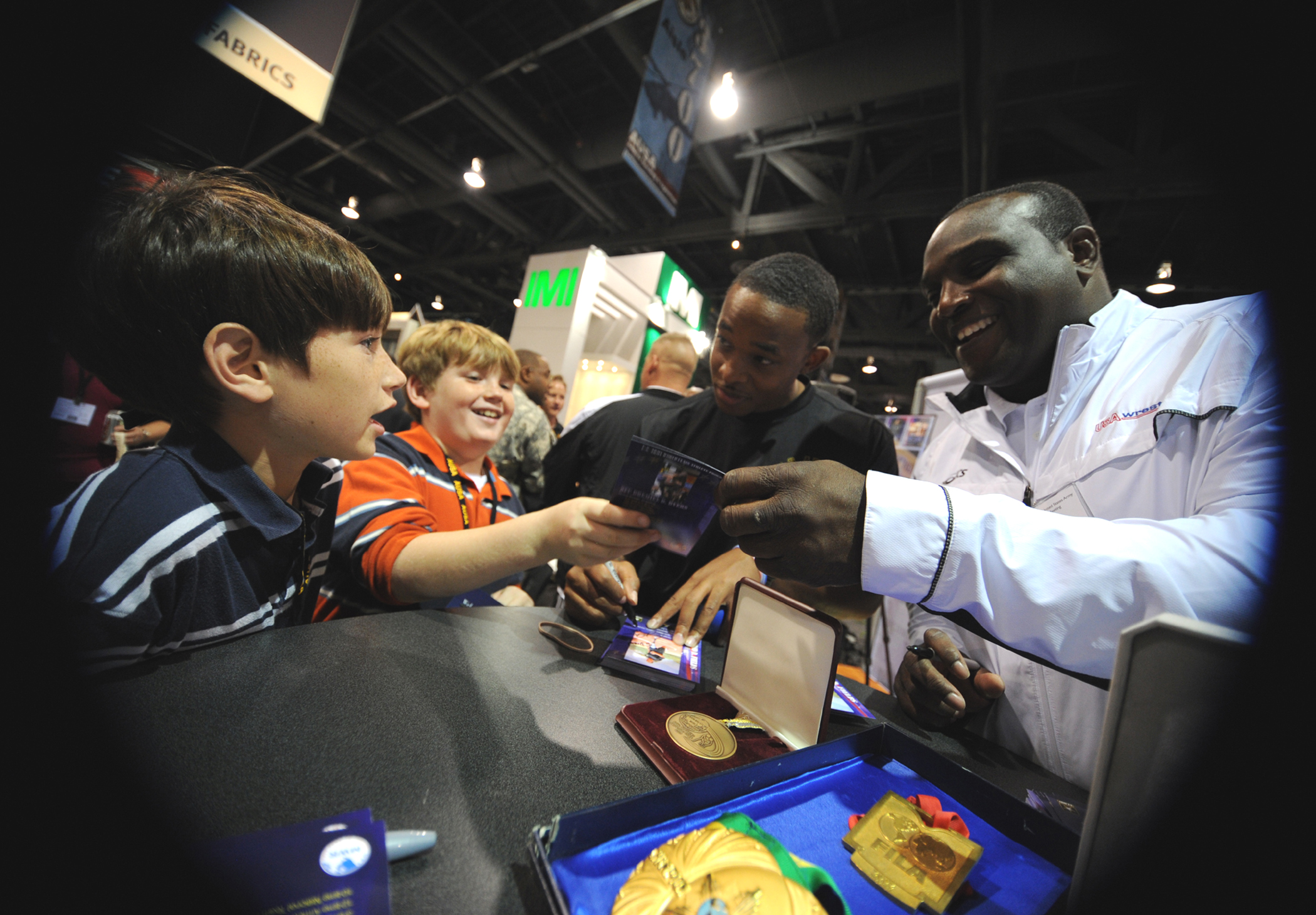
WCAP athletes sign autographs for fans, 2009 AUSA Conference.

== WCAP Olympians ==
=== 2008 ===
During the Beijing 2008 Summer Olympics three WCAP athletes and one coach represented WCAP and the US Army in the XXIX Olympiad:

- Maj. Michael Anti, shooting
- Staff Sgt. Dremiel Byers, Greco-Roman wrestling, 120 kg
- Staff Sgt. Keith Sanderson, rapid fire pistol
- Maj. David Johnson, Team USA shooting coach

=== 2010 ===
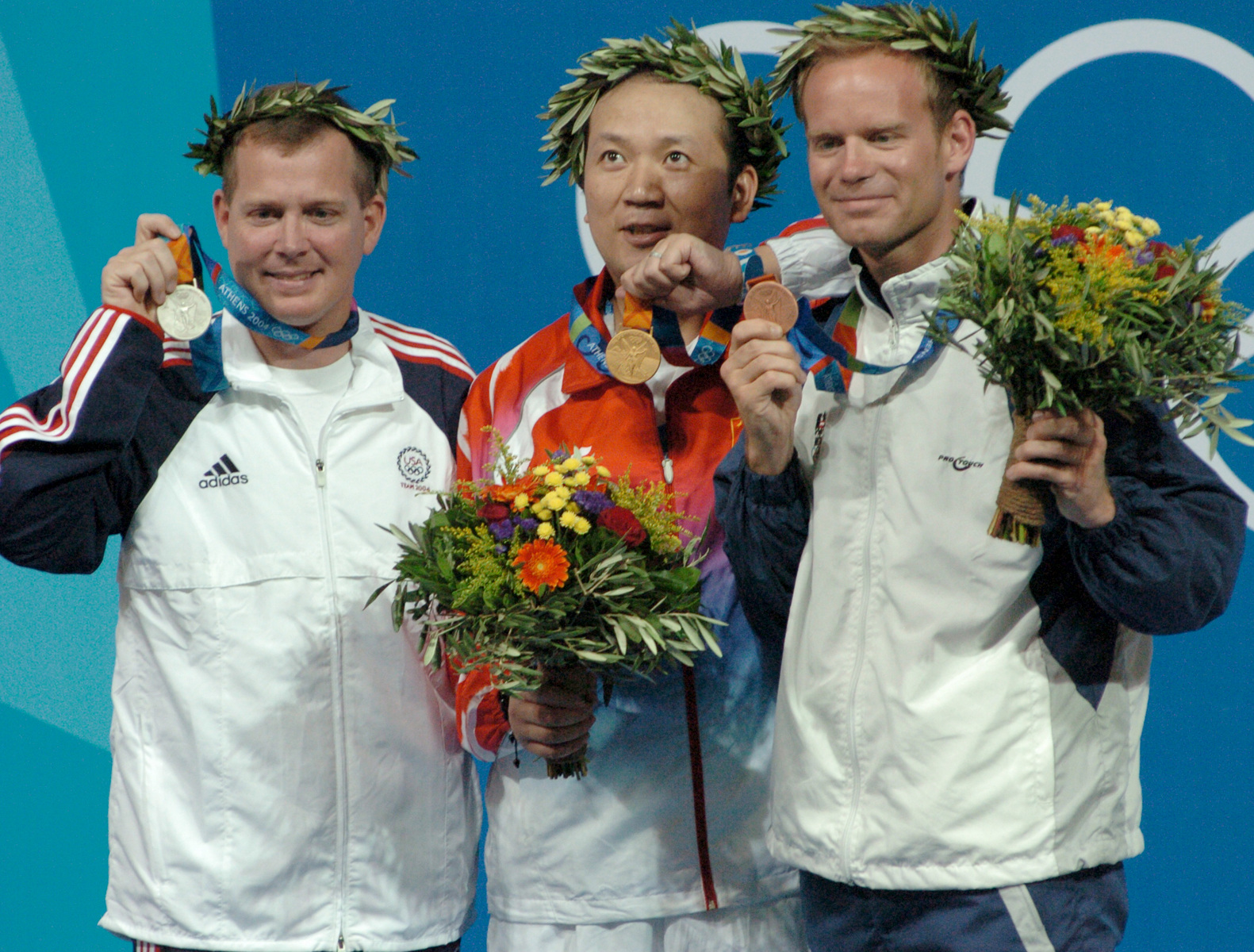
Maj. Michael Anti (left), a marksman with the U.S. Army World Class Athlete Program assigned to the U.S. Army Marskmanship Unit at Fort Benning, Ga., flashes his silver medal alongside gold medalist Zhanbo Jia of China (center) and bronze medalist Christian Planer (right) of Austria after completion of the men's 50-meter rifle three-position event in the 2004 Summer Olympic Games at Markopoulo Olympic Shooting Centre.

During the 2010 Vancouver Winter Games three soldier-athletes and one coach represented WCAP and the US Army in the XXI Olympiad.

- Sgt. Jeremy Teela, biathlon
- Sgt. John Napier, bobsled
- 1st Lt. Christopher Fogt, bobsled
- Sgt. Bill Tavares, Team USA bobsled coach

=== 2012 ===
The program sent seven athletes and four coaches to the London 2012 Summer Olympics.

- Sgt. 1st Class Dremiel Byers, Greco-Roman wrestling, 120 kg
- Sgt. 1st Class Keith Sanderson, rapid fire pistol
- Sgt. 1st Class Daryl Szarenski, pistol
- Staff Sgt. John Nunn, 50 km racewalk
- Spc. Justin Lester, Greco-Roman wrestling, 66 kg
- Sgt. Spenser Mango, Greco-Roman wrestling, 55 kg
- Spc. Dennis Bowsher, modern pentathlon

=== 2014 ===
The program sent six athletes and nine coaches to the 2014 Winter Olympics.

- Sgt. Nick Cunningham, bobsled
- Capt. Christopher Fogt, bobsled
- Sgt. Preston Griffall, luge
- Sgt. Matt Mortensen, luge
- Sgt. Justin Olsen, bobsled
- Sgt. Dallas Robinson, bobsled
- 1st Lt. Mike Kohn, bobsled coach
- Sgt. 1st Class Tuffy Latour, skeleton coach
- Staff Sgt. Bill Tavares, luge coach

=== 2016 ===
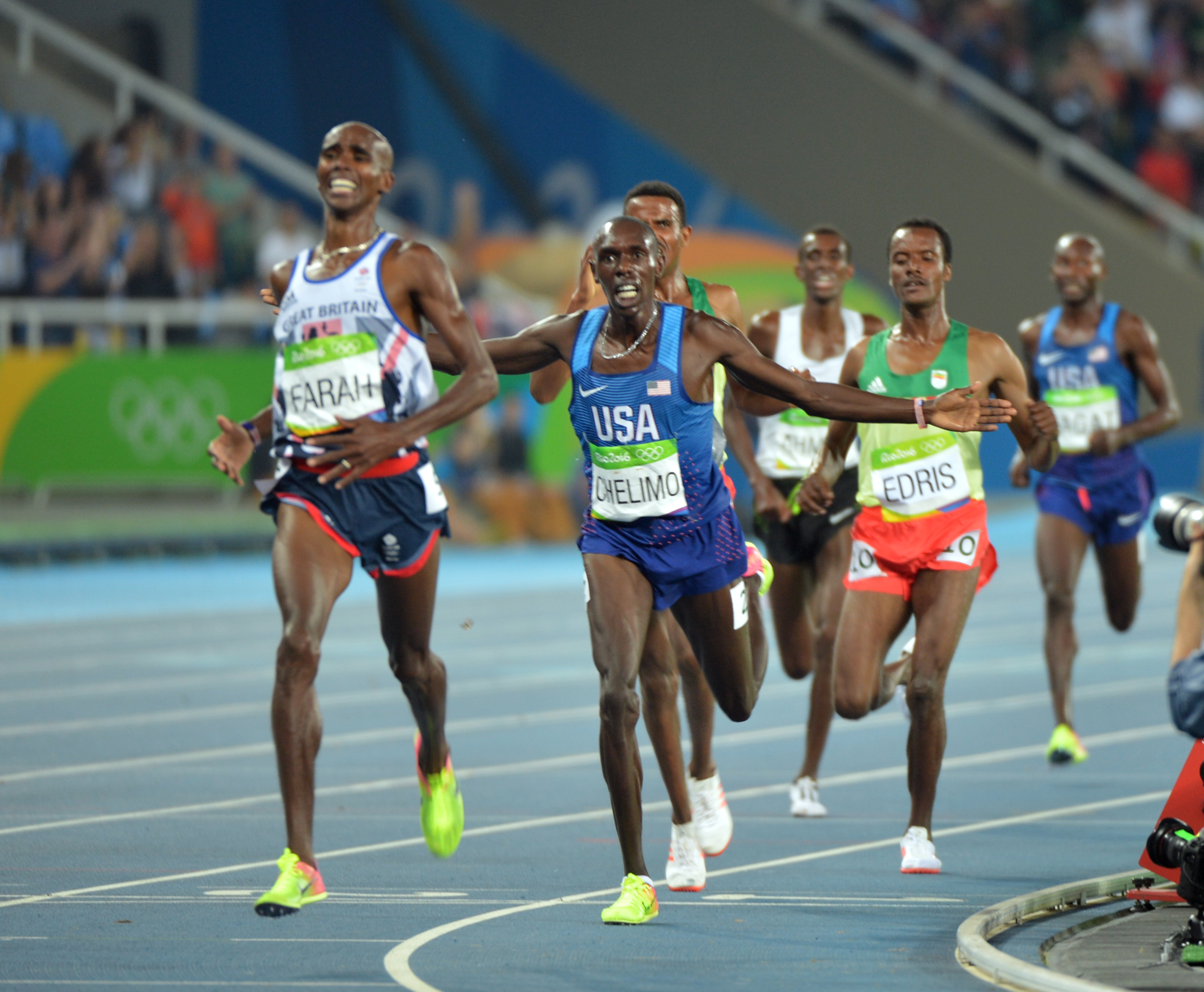
Spc. Paul Chelimo of the U.S. Army World Class Athlete Program finishes runner-up to Mo Farah of Great Britain to claim the silver medal in the men's 5,000-meter run with a personal-best time of 13 minutes, 3.90 seconds at the Rio Olympic Games in Rio de Janeiro

The program sent four Kenyan-born soldier-runners to compete at the Rio 2016 Summer Olympics.

- Sgt. Hillary Bor, 3,000 m steeplechase
- Spc. Paul Chelimo, 5,000 m run, won the silver medal
- Spc. Shadrack Kipchirchir, 10,000 m run
- Spc. Leonard Korir, 10,000 m run

as well as

- Staff Sgt. John Nunn, 50 km racewalk

=== 2018 ===
During the 2018 Winter Olympics in Pyeongchang, South Korea seven soldier-athletes represented WCAP and the US Army in the XXIII Olympiad.

- Maj. Christopher Fogt, two and four-man bobsled
- Sgt. 1st Class Nate Weber, four-man bobsled
- Sgt. Nick Cunningham, two and four-man bobsled
- Sgt. Justin Olsen, two and four-man bobsled
- Sgt. Emily Sweeney, singles luge
- Sgt. Taylor Morris, singles luge
- Sgt. Matthew Mortensen, doubles luge

=== 2020 ===
During the 2020 Summer Olympics in Tokyo, Japan twelve soldier-athletes represented WCAP and the US Army in the XXXII Olympiad.

- Staff Sgt. Naomi Graham, boxing
- Staff Sgt. Sandra Uptagrafft, shooting
- 1st Lt. Amber English, shooting
- Staff Sgt. Nickolaus Mowrer, shooting
- Sgt. 1st Class Elizabeth Marks, Paralympic swimming
- Staff Sgt. Kevin Nguyen, Paralympic shooting
- Staff Sgt. John Joss, Paralympic shooting
- Sgt. Ildar Hafizov, wrestling
- Spc. Alejandro Sancho, wrestling
- Sgt. Amro Elgeziry, modern pentathlon
- Sgt. Samantha Schultz, modern pentathlon
- Spc. Benard Keter, athletics

=== 2022 ===
During the 2022 Winter Olympics in Beijing, China five soldier-athletes represented WCAP and the US Army in the XXIV Olympiad.

- Sgt. Emily Sweeney, singles luge
- Sgt. Ben Loomis, Nordic combined
- Sgt. Jasper Good, Nordic combined
- Spc. Hakeem Abdul-Saboor, two and four-man bobsled
- Spc. Frank Del Duca, two and four-man bobsled

=== 2024 ===
During the 2024 Summer Olympics in Paris, France five soldier-athletes represented WCAP and the US Army in the XXXIII Olympiad.

- Capt. Sammy Sullivan, rugby sevens
- Master Sgt. Dennis Bowsher, modern pentathlon
- Sgt. 1st Class Spenser Mango, wrestling coach
- Staff Sgt. Leonard Korir, athletics
- Spc. Kamal Bey, Greco-Roman wrestling

A further three individuals partook in the 2024 Paralympic Games:

- Sgt. 1st Class Elizabeth Marks, swimming
- Sgt. 1st Class John Wayne Joss III, shooting
- Staff Sgt. Kevin Nguyen, shooting

=== 2026 ===
During the 2026 Winter Olympics in Italy six soldier-athletes and three coaches represented WCAP and the US Army in the XXV Olympiad.

- Sgt. Frank Del Duca, two and four-man bobsled
- Spc. Azaria Hill, bobsled
- Sgt. Ben Loomis, Nordic combined
- Private 2nd Class Spencer Howe, pairs figure skating
- Spc. Sean Doherty (biathlete), biathlon
- Staff Sgt. Deedra Irwin, biathlon

== Other notable WCAP alumni ==
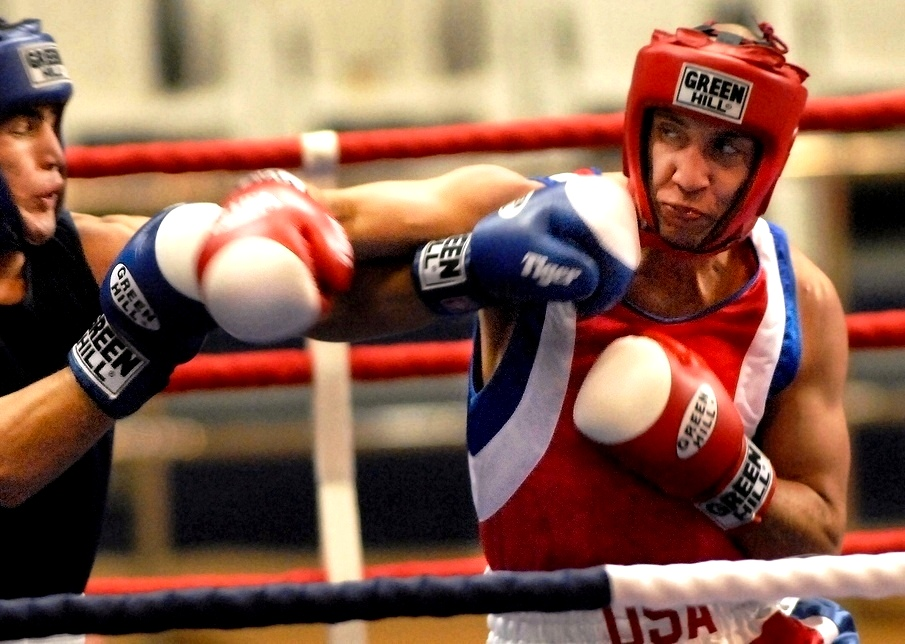
Boyd Melson (right)

- CPT Boyd Melson (Boxing)

-2004 World Military Boxing Championships, gold medal (69-kg. weight class)

- SSG Jenna Burkert- 2021 World bronze medalist, Olympic Alternate, 4x World Team member.

== Sources ==
- Pearce, Kelly (27 November 1996). "Army brings elite athlete program to Fort Carson". Colorado Springs Gazette Telegraph.
- WCAP Selection Standards
- Eligibility and Application Procedures for the Army World Class Athlete Program
- US Army WCAP Official Website
- US Army Olympians
- Seven Soldiers, Alums, Make Team USA for Olympic Winter Games
- Army Regulation 215–1 Morale, Welfare, and Recreation
