= Shadrack Kipchirchir =

American long-distance runner

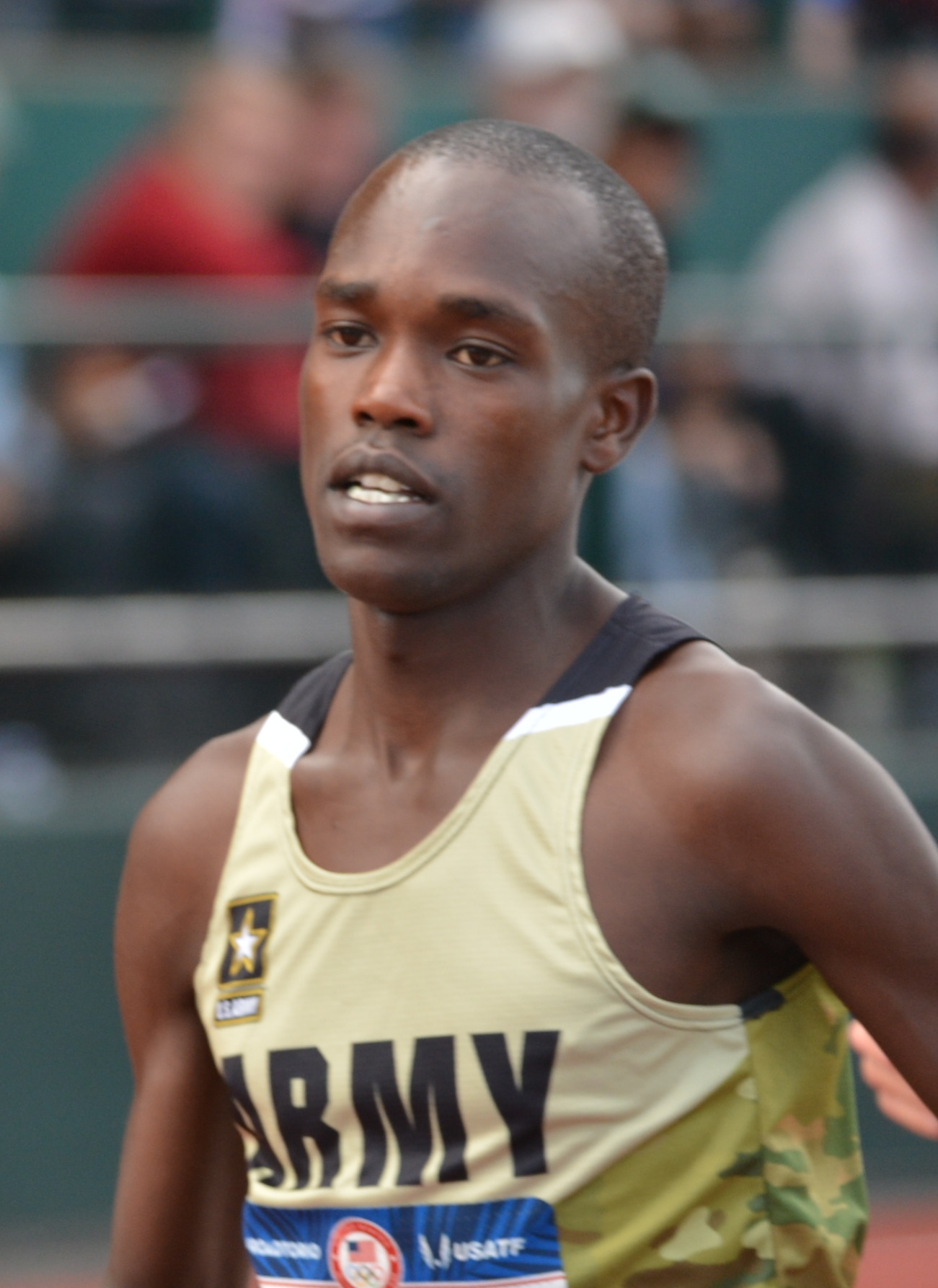
- Kipchirchir in 2016

Personal information
- Nationality: American
- Born: February 22, 1989 (age 37) Eldoret, Kenya
- Height: 5 ft 6 in (168 cm)
- Weight: 119 lb (54 kg)

Sport
- Sport: Track
- Events: 5000 meters, 10,000 meters
- College team: Oklahoma State University
- Club: U.S. Army WCAP
- Turned pro: 2014

Achievements and titles
- Olympic finals: 2016
- World finals: 2015, 2017, 2018
- Personal bests: 3000 metres: 7:45.49 5000 meters: 13:37.68 10,000 meters: 27:07.55

Shadrack Kipchirchir (born February 22, 1989) is a Kenyan-born American distance track and field Olympian specializing in the 10,000 m. Following in his brothers footsteps, Kipchirchir enlisted in the U.S. Army in October 2014 and joined the U.S. Army World Class Athlete Program after his enlistment.

He is a silver medalist at the 2014 NCAA Outdoor Championships in the 10,000 meters and placed second in the 2016 U.S. Olympic Trials - Track & Field 10,000 m. He ran 27:58.32 and finished 19th for the 2016 Summer Olympics 8th in 3000 meters at the 2018 World Championships.

== Early life and college ==
Kipchirchir had no experience running competitively until he moved to the United States, but earned All-America honors at Western Kentucky and Oklahoma State University where he studied Construction engineering to become an Engineer.

Representing Oklahoma State University
Year	Big 12 xc	NCAA xc	Big 12 indoor	NCAA indoor	Big 12 Outdoor	NCAA Outdoor
2013-14	30:36.6 8th	30:37.8 31st			14:44.21 2nd 30:27.34 2nd	28:32.31 2nd 13:47.18 9th
2012-13	23:58.5 3rd	29:43.0 18th	7:56.20 2nd	13:55.00 11th		
2011-12	23:34.8 5th	30:22.4 50th	13:49.04 1st	13:54.24 9th	14:03.02 3rd 29:32.99 2nd	
Representing Western Kentucky University
Year	Sun Belt xc	NCAA xc	Sun Belt indoor	NCAA indoor	Sun Belt Outdoor	NCAA Outdoor
2010-11	24:33.10 1st	30:20.50 27th	4:13.10 2nd 8:26.89 2nd 14:40.81 2nd		30:16.87 1st	29:38.39 16th
2009-10			14:39.15 3rd 8:26.18 5th		4:03.00 7th 14:40.71 4th	

== Professional ==
Kipchirchir joined the U.S. Army World Class Athlete Program after his enlistment in 2014.

Shadrack Kipchirchir finished 4th in the Athletics at the 2015 Pan American Games – Men's 10,000 metres.

On 22 August 2015, Shadrack finished 16th in the 2015 World Championships in Athletics – Men's 10,000 metres for United States at the 2015 World Championships in Athletics.

Kipchirchir ran a season best time 27:58.32 at Athletics at the 2016 Summer Olympics – Men's 10,000 metres to place 19th.

On August 4, Kipchirchir finished ninth in a personal best time of 27:07.55 in the 10 km at the 2017 World Championships in Athletics – Men's 10,000 metres.

Kipchirchir has been sponsored by Nike since 2017 and trains in Colorado with American Distance Project.

In March 2018, Kipchirchir finished 8th in the prelim of the 3000 meters at the 2018 World Championships.

Year	Competition	Venue	Position	Event	Notes
2015	2015 Pan American	Toronto, Ontario Canada	4th	10,000 m	29:01.55
2015	World Championships	Beijing, China	16th	10,000 m	28:16.30
2016	2016 Summer Olympics	Rio de Janeiro, Brazil	19th	10,000 m	27:58.32
2017	2017 World Championships	London, United Kingdom	9th	10,000 m	27:07.55
2018	2018 World Indoor Championships	Birmingham, United Kingdom	8th [P] DQ in Final	3000 m	7:57.08
2019	2019 IAAF World Cross Country Championships	Aarhus, Denmark	34th	10km	33:46
2019	2019 World Championships	Doha, Qatar	10th	10,000 m	27:24.74

US Track National Championship	Venue	Place	Event	Time
2022 USA Cross Country Championships	Mission Bay Park, San Diego, California	1st	10,000 m	30:32
2021 USA 15 km Road Running Championship	Jacksonville, Florida	2nd	15 km	43:55
2019 USA Outdoor Track and Field Championships	Drake Stadium; Des Moines, Iowa	2nd	10,000 m	27:47.71
2019 USA Cross Country Championships	Tallahassee, Florida	1st	10,000 m	28:53
2018 USA Outdoor Track and Field Championships	Drake Stadium; Des Moines, Iowa	2nd	10,000 m	28:59.67
2018 USA Indoor Track and Field Championships	Albuquerque, New Mexico	2nd	3000 m	7:58.42
2018 USA Indoor Track and Field Championships	Albuquerque, New Mexico	4th	1500 m	3:43.31
2017 USA Outdoor Track and Field Championships	Sacramento, California	2nd	10,000 m	29:01.68
2016 United States Olympic Trials (track and field)	Eugene, Oregon	2nd	10,000 m	28:01.52
2016 United States Olympic Trials (track and field)	Eugene, Oregon	7th	5000 m	13:39.79
2015 USA Outdoor Track and Field Championships	Hayward Field; Eugene, Oregon	4th	10,000 m	28:19.40

=== 2015 ===
Shadrack Kipchirchir finished 4th in the 10,000 meters at the 2015 USA Outdoor Track and Field Championships to qualify for the 2015 World Championships in Athletics – Men's 10,000 metres.

Kipchirchir finished 3rd in 34:37 in the 2015 USATF 12 km road championships .US National 12K in Alexandria, Virginia.

=== 2016 ===
Kipchirchir finished second in 44:40 in the Gate River Run 2016 USATF 15 km championships March 2016 in Jacksonville, Florida.

Kipchirchir finished in second place in the 10,000 meters race at the Stanford Invitational in 27:58.91 in April 2016 in Stanford, California. More important than the victory is the time was under the qualification standard for the 2016 Olympics.

At the 2016 US Olympic Trials, Kipchirchir finished in second place behind Galen Rupp to represent Team USA at Athletics at the 2016 Summer Olympics – Men's 10,000 metres.

Kipchirchir finished in second place behind Ryan Hill at USATF 5 km Championships hosted by CVS Health Downtown 5k in Providence, Rhode Island in a time of 13:58.

=== 2017 ===
On February 4, Kipchirchir finished 3rd in 30:18.6 in the 2017 USATF cross country 10 km championships in Bend, Oregon.

On March 11, Kipchirchir finished second in 43:23 by less than a second to Leonard Korir in the Gate River Run 2017 USATF 15 km road championships in Jacksonville, Florida.

On June 22, Kipchirchir finished second in 29:01.68 by a second to Hassan Mead at 2017 USA Outdoor Track and Field Championships in the 10 km.

On July 4, Kipchirchir finished second in 28:17 by a second to Leonard Korir in the Peachtree Road Race 2017 USATF road 10 km championships in Atlanta Georgia.

On August 4, Kipchirchir finished ninth in a personal best time of 27:07.55 in the 10 km at the 2017 World Championships in Athletics – Men's 10,000 metres.

On October 1, Kipchirchir finished first in 47:33 to win by less than a second in front of Leonard Korir in the Medtronic TC 10 Mile 2017 USATF road 10 mile championships in St Paul-Minneapolis.

On November 4, Kipchirchir finished first in 13:57 to win by less than a second in front of Tommy Curtin, Kirubel Erassa, and Paul Chelimo in the Abbott Dash to the Finish Line 5K 2017 USATF road 5 km championships in New York, New York.

=== 2018 ===
On February 3, Kipchirchir won the 3 km at the Millrose Games in a season best time 7:45.49.

On February 17, Kipchirchir finished second in 7:58.42 by a second to Paul Chelimo in the 3 km at the 2018 USA Indoor Track and Field Championships and finished 4th in the 1500 meters in a time of 3:43.31.

On June 21, Kipchirchir finished second in 28:59.67 by a second to Lopez Lomong in the 10 km at the 2018 USA Outdoor Track and Field Championships.
