= Taylor Morris =

Taylor Morris may refer to:

- Taylor Morris (luger)
- Taylor Morris (figure skater)
