= Aron Rono =

American long-distance runner

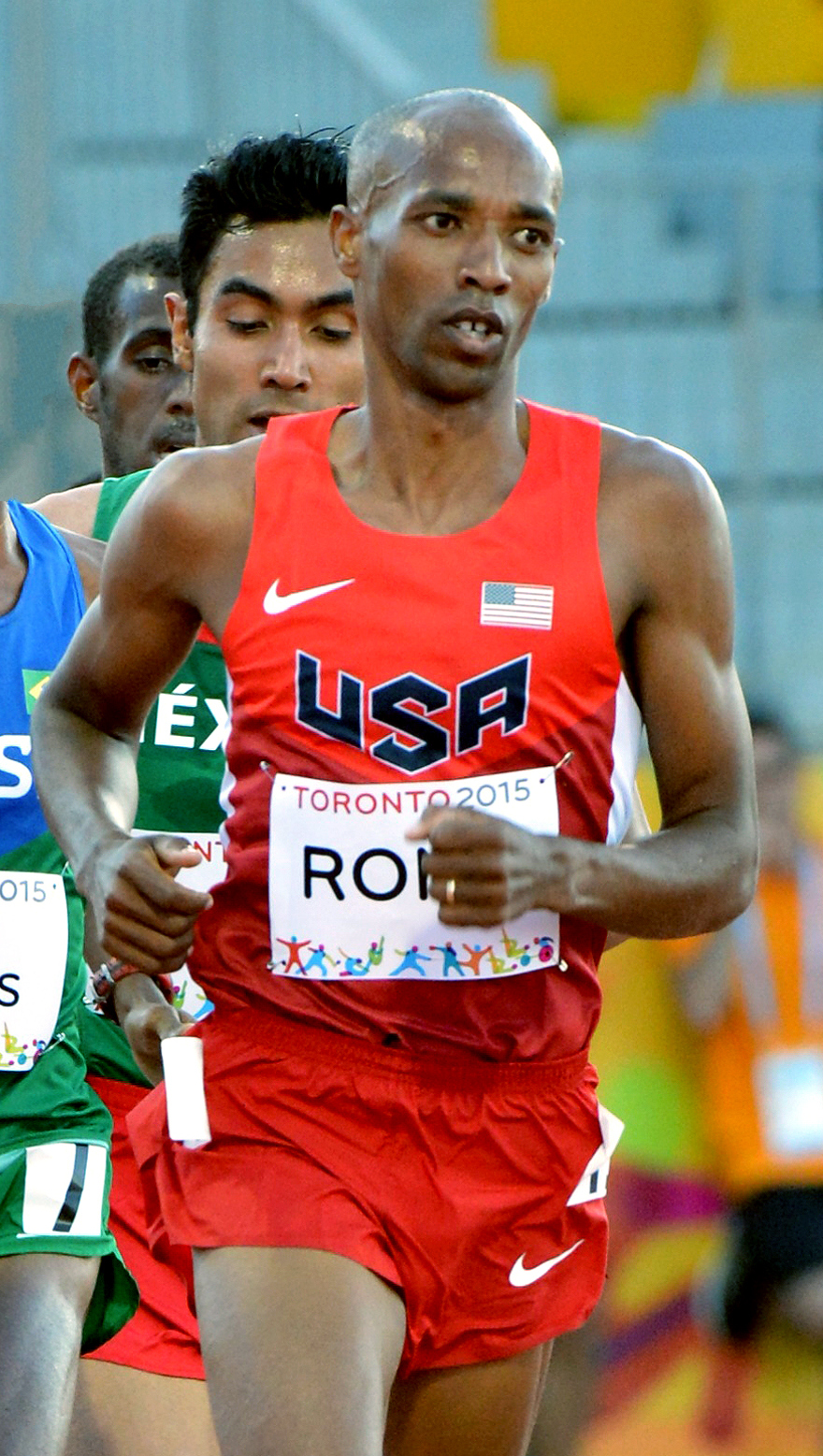
- Rono at the 2015 Pan American Games

Personal information
- Born: 1 November 1982 (age 43) Eldoret, Kenya
- Education: Azusa Pacific University

Sport
- Sport: Athletics
- Events: 5000 m, 10,000 m, half marathon
- Club: U.S. Army

Achievements and titles
- Personal bests: 5000 m – 13:23.52 (2012); 10,000 m – 27:31.15 (2011); HM – 1:02:25 (2015)
Medal record
Representing the United States
Pan American Games
Silver medal – second place	2015 Toronto	10,000 m

Aron Rono (born 1 November 1982) is a Kenyan American long-distance runner. After completing a high school in Kenya he moved to the United States, where he graduated in political sciences from the Azusa Pacific University in 2009. As a member of the U.S. Army World Class Athlete Program he won a silver medal in the 10,000 m event at the 2015 Pan American Games.
