= Athletics at the 2015 Pan American Games – Men's 10,000 metres =

Men's 10,000 metres at the 2015 Pan American Games
- Venue: CIBC Pan Am and Parapan Am Athletics Stadium
- Dates: July 21
- Competitors: 14 from 11 nations
- Winning time: 28:49.96

Medalists
| Gold medal | Mohammed Ahmed | Canada |
| Silver medal | Aron Rono | United States |
| Bronze medal | Juan Luis Barrios | Mexico |

The men's 10 000 metres sprint competition of the athletics events at the 2015 Pan American Games took place on July 21 at the CIBC Pan Am and Parapan Am Athletics Stadium in Toronto, Canada. The defending Pan American Games champion is Marilson Santos of Brazil.

== Records ==
Prior to this competition, the existing world and Pan American Games records were as follows:

| World record | Kenenisa Bekele (ETH) | 26:17.53 | Brussels, Belgium | August 26, 2005 |
| Pan American Games record | José David Galván (MEX) | 28:08.74 | Rio de Janeiro, Brazil | July 27, 2007 |

== Qualification ==
Each National Olympic Committee (NOC) was able to enter up to two entrants providing they had met the minimum standard (30.10.00) in the qualifying period (January 1, 2014 to June 28, 2015).

== Schedule ==
| Date | Time | Round |
|---|---|---|
| July 21, 2015 | 19:55 | Final |

== Results ==
All times shown are in seconds.

| KEY: | q | Fastest non-qualifiers | Q | Qualified | NR | National record | PB | Personal best | SB | Seasonal best | DQ | Disqualified |

=== Final ===
| Rank | Name | Nationality | Time | Notes |
|---|---|---|---|---|
| 1st place, gold medalist(s) | Mohammed Ahmed | Canada | 28:49.96 | |
| 2nd place, silver medalist(s) | Aron Rono | United States | 28:50.83 | |
| 3rd place, bronze medalist(s) | Juan Luis Barrios | Mexico | 28:51.57 | |
| 4 | Shadrack Kipchirchir | United States | 29:01.55 | |
| 5 | Luis Ostos | Peru | 29:03.93 | |
| 6 | Bayron Piedra | Ecuador | 30:16.02 | |
| 7 | Mario Pacay | Guatemala | 30:16.37 | |
| 8 | Leslie Encina | Chile | 30:30.12 | |
| 9 | James Cesar Rosa | Puerto Rico | 30:39.66 | |
| 10 | Aaron Hendrikx | Canada | 31:27.16 | |
| 11 | Alvaro Sanabria | Costa Rica | 31:41.77 | |
| | Daniel Chaves da Silva | Brazil | DNF | |
| | Jose Mauricio Gonzalez | Colombia | DNF | |
| | Giovani dos Santos | Brazil | DSQ | |
