= Taylor Morris (luger) =

American luger (born 1991)

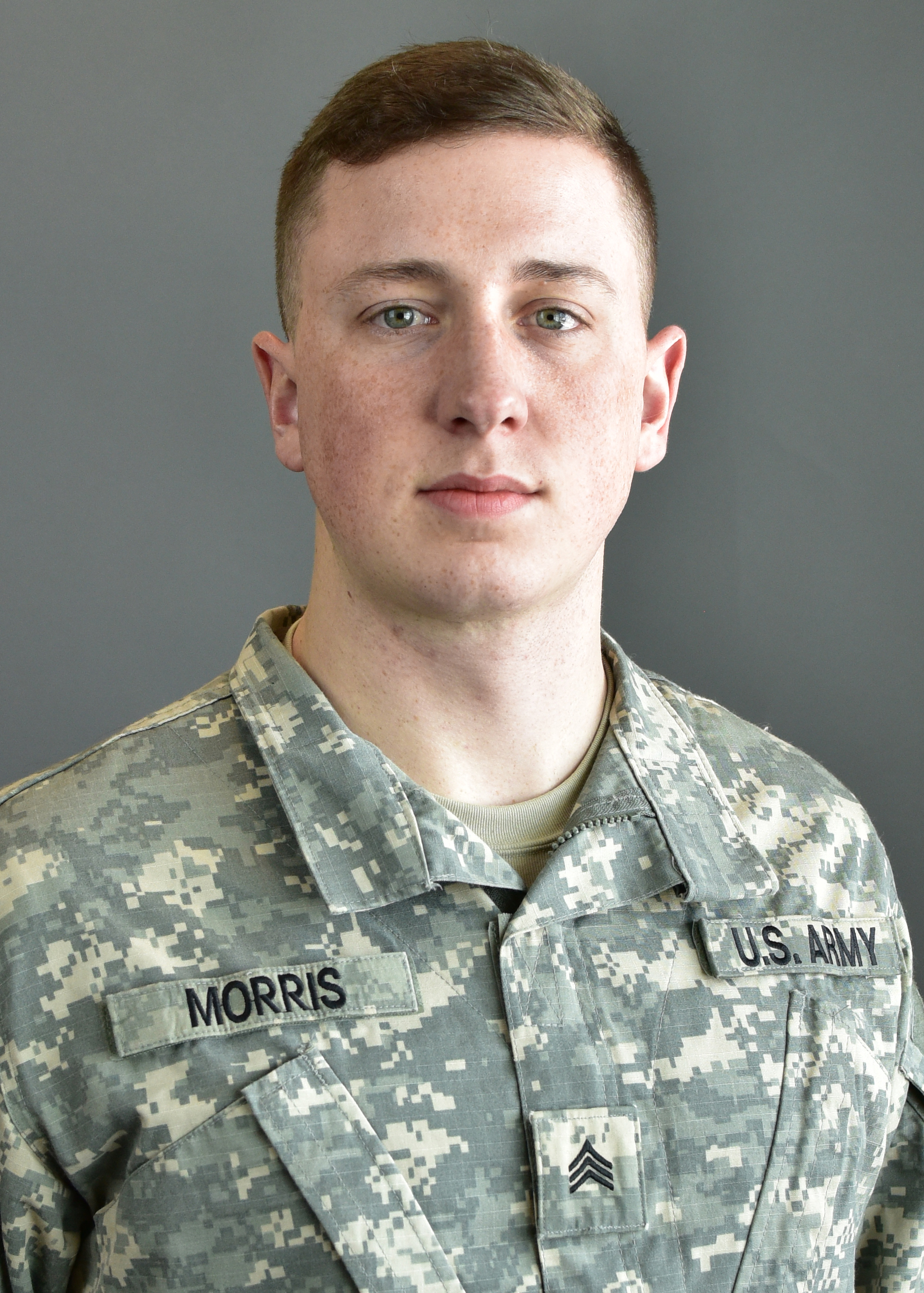
- Sgt Morris in 2017

Personal information
- Nationality: American
- Born: June 4, 1991 (age 35) Salt Lake City, Utah, U.S.
- Height: 178 cm (5 ft 10 in)
- Weight: 88 kg (194 lb)

Sport
- Sport: Luge
- Club: U.S. Army WCAP
- Coached by: Bill Tavares (national)

Taylor Cloy Morris (born June 4, 1991) is an American luger. He competed in the singles event at the 2018 Winter Olympics and placed 18th.

Morris is colorblind. He took up luge aged 10 and won the national junior championships twice. In 2014 he was a substitute in the U.S. Olympic team.

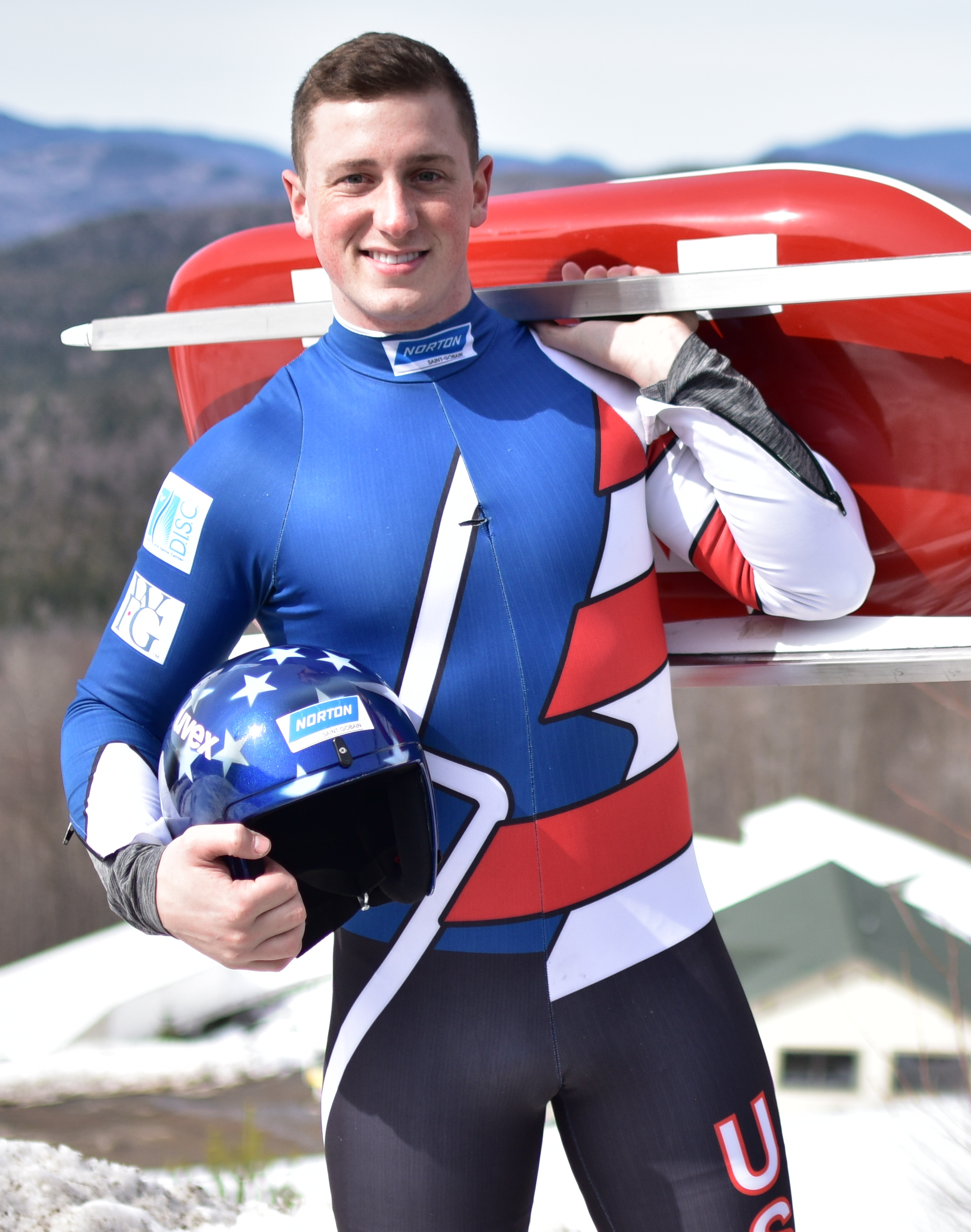

Morris is married to Megan. In July 2011 he joined the U.S. Army, and by 2017 held a rank of sergeant.
