= Nathan Weber =

American bobsledder (born 1987)

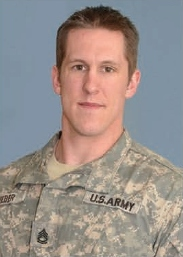
- Weber in 2017

Personal information
- Born: February 1, 1987 (age 39) Denver, Colorado, U.S.
- Height: 188 cm (6 ft 2 in)
- Weight: 102 kg (225 lb)

Sport
- Sport: Bobsled
- Club: U.S. Army WCAP
- Coached by: Brian Shimer (national)

Nathan "Nate" Weber (born February 1, 1987) is an American bobsledder. He competed in the four-man event at the 2018 Winter Olympics.

Weber joined the U.S. Army in 2005, and served with the Special Forces in Niger, Cameroon and Afghanistan. In 2012, he started training as a bobsled pusher, in Lake Placid, New York, motivated by the American bobsledder Justin Olsen. He is currently in the U.S. Army World Class Athlete Program.

== Early life ==
Weber was born in Denver, Colorado and while in high school, he was part of the wrestling team. He says "So most guys on the (Olympic) team come from a track or football background and I'm a little bit different in that regard. I grew up wrestling, that's what I was the best at."

== Military career ==
Weber join the United States Army in 2005 right after high school. Weber enlisted as an infantryman and after basic training his first assignment was with The Old Guard where he spent the next 2 1/2 years before being accepted to selection in 2007. After graduating from the Special Forces Qualification Course, Weber attended the United States Army Airborne School, learned a foreign language, and then went on to become a special forces medical sergeant (18D). He was assigned to the 10th Special Forces Group in Fort Carson, Colorado and was deployed to Niger, Africa in 2014. Weber has also deployed to Cameroon, and Afghanistan. Weber is currently in the U.S. Army World Class Athlete Program having transitioned from the special forces.
