= Dennis Bowsher =

American modern pentathlete (born 1983)

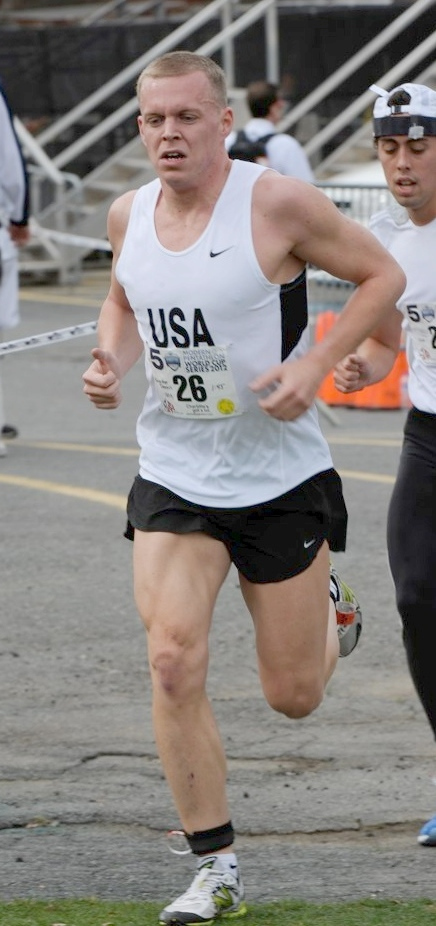
- Bowsher in 2012

Personal information
- Born: April 7, 1983 (age 43) Dallas, Texas, U.S.
- Height: 5 ft 8 1/2 in (174 cm)
- Weight: 161 lb (73 kg)

Sport
- Sport: Modern pentathlon
- Club: U.S. Army WCAP
- Military career
- Allegiance: United States
- Branch: United States Army
- Service years: 2005–present
- Rank: Master sergeant

Dennis Bowsher (born April 7, 1983) is an American modern pentathlete. He competed at the 2012 Summer Olympics and finished in 32nd place. Bowsher started training in swimming, and only later changed to pentathlon.
