= 2018 IAAF World Indoor Championships – Men's 3000 metres =

Men's 3000 metres at the 2018 IAAF World Indoor Championships
- Venue: Arena Birmingham
- Dates: 2–4 March
- Competitors: 22 from 14 nations
- Winning time: 8:14.41

Medalists
gold medal	Yomif Kejelcha	Ethiopia
silver medal	Selemon Barega	Ethiopia
bronze medal	Bethwell Birgen	Kenya

Video on YouTube Official Video

The men's 3000 metres at the 2018 IAAF World Indoor Championships took place on 2 and 4 March 2018.

== Summary ==
With more lane violations being called even as they would be less significant in a race of this distance, four were disqualified in the heats, most notably Olympic silver medalist Paul Chelimo, jostled into taking one step inside the rail.

The final began at a jog, with first Yassin Bouih stepping out to the lead, then Clemens Bleistein to lead the race through at 1:14.58 first 400. The three Ethiopian runners all went to the back of the pack. Davis Kiplangat moved to the front but didn't really push the pace. After another lap, Adel Mechaal took the point, the next 400 accomplished even slower in at 1:15.12. Mechaal took the field through another slightly faster 400 in 1:12.12 as the Ethiopians at the back began to get impatient. Hagos Gebrhiwet began to move forward in the pack, then Yomif Kejelcha joined him. Towards the end of the next 400, Selemon Barega made a big move to sweep toward the front. With the acceleration, the Kenyans and ex-pat Shadrack Kipchirchir moved forward, Kejelcha taking over the lead. Mechaal came back to re-join the mix, then Barega made a big move to reach Kejelcha's shoulder, an Ethiopian wall at the front. Gebrhiwet then came forward on the outside, closing the box on the pursuers Kipchirchir and exchanging elbows with Mechaal. Gebrhiwet continued to move forward to second position. The three Ethiopians continued to accelerate, their strategic box broken into a line at the front. Free to move, Bethwell Birgen ran past Barega at the bell while Kejelcha was breaking free off the front. Down the final backstretch Birgen passed the fading Gebrhiwet. As Kejelcha extended his lead on to victory, Barega passed Gebrhiwet on the final turn, then launched his final sprint past a struggling Birgen who barely held off a resurgent Gebrhiwet and Mechaal for bronze.

== Results ==
=== Heats ===
The heats were started on 2 March at 12:55.

Rank	Heat	Name	Nationality	Time	Notes
1	1	Yomif Kejelcha	Ethiopia	7:42.83	Q
2	1	Hagos Gebrhiwet	Ethiopia	7:43.55	Q
3	1	Adel Mechaal	Spain	7:43.83	Q
4	1	Birhanu Balew	Bahrain	7:44.03	Q, PB
5	1	Bethwell Birgen	Kenya	7:45.06	q
6	1	Younès Essalhi	Morocco	7:45.07	q, PB
7	2	Selemon Barega	Ethiopia	7:48.14	Q
8	2	Davis Kiplangat	Kenya	7:48.26	Q
9	1	Clemens Bleistein	Germany	7:49.01	q, PB
10	2	Yassin Bouih	Italy	7:50.65	Q, PB
11	2	Julian Oakley	New Zealand	7:55.92	Q
12	1	Shadrack Kipchirchir	United States	7:57.08	q
13	2	Federico Bruno	Argentina	7:58.98	SB
14	1	Thierry Ndikumwenayo	Burundi	8:09.11	
15	1	Hamish Carson	New Zealand	8:14.40	
16	2	Jonathan Davies	Great Britain	8:21.73	
	2	Paul Chelimo	United States	DQ	R163.3(b)
	2	Richard Ringer	Germany	DQ	R163.2(b)
	2	Youssouf Hiss Bachir	Djibouti	DQ	R163.3(b)
	2	Kemoy Campbell	Jamaica	DQ	R163.3(b)
	2	Albert Rop	Bahrain	DNS	
	1	Djamal Abdi Direh	Djibouti	DNS	

=== Final ===
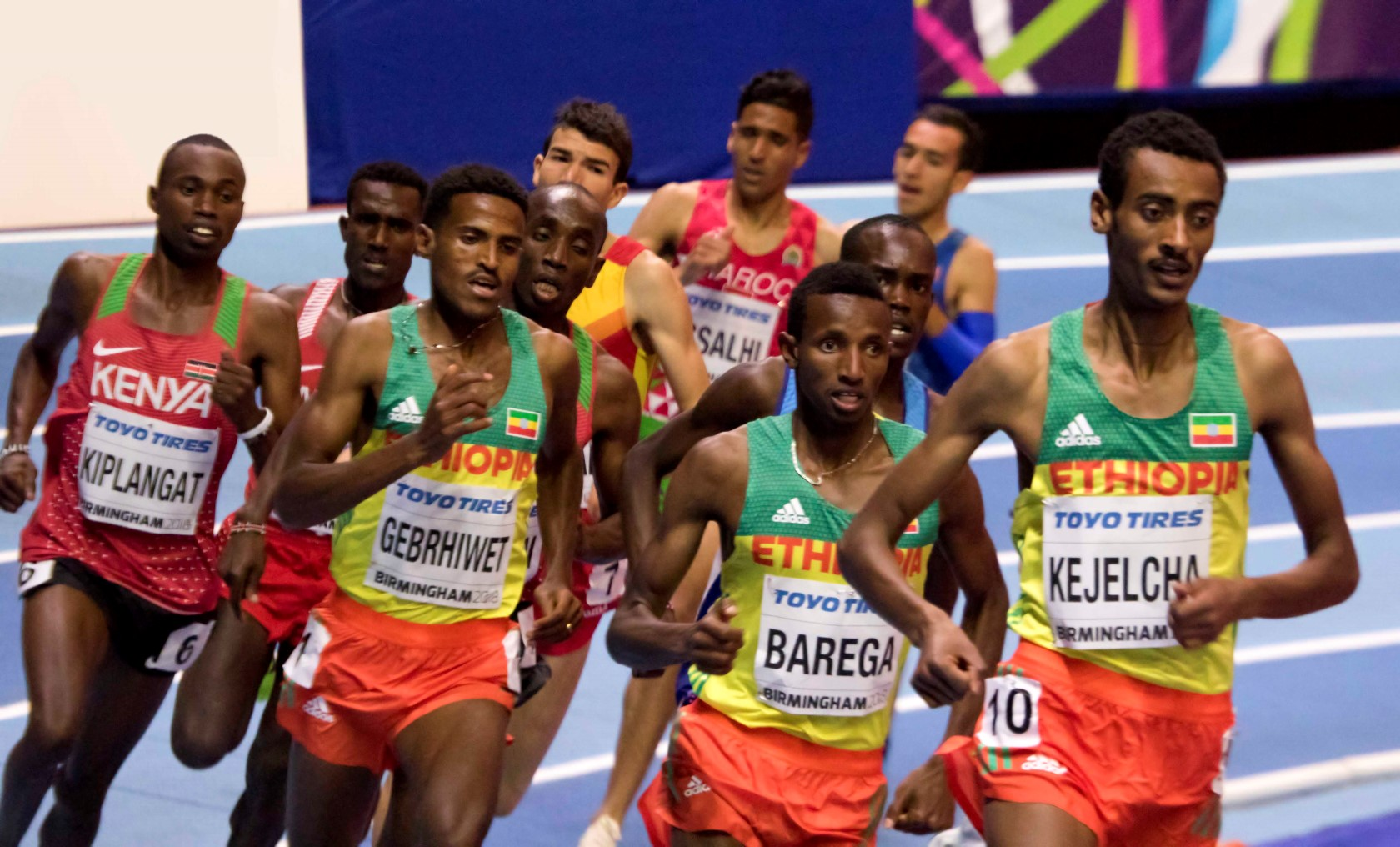
The final underway

The final was started on 4 March at 15:35.

Rank	Name	Nationality	Time	Notes
1st place, gold medalist(s)	Yomif Kejelcha	Ethiopia	8:14.41	
2nd place, silver medalist(s)	Selemon Barega	Ethiopia	8:15.59	
3rd place, bronze medalist(s)	Bethwell Birgen	Kenya	8:15.70	
4	Hagos Gebrhiwet	Ethiopia	8:15.76	
5	Adel Mechaal	Spain	8:16.13	
6	Younès Essalhi	Morocco	8:16.63	
7	Davis Kiplangat	Kenya	8:18.03	
8	Clemens Bleistein	Germany	8:18.24	
9	Julian Oakley	New Zealand	8:18.60	
10	Birhanu Balew	Bahrain	8:18.89	
11	Yassin Bouih	Italy	8:20.84	
	Shadrack Kipchirchir	United States	DQ	163.3(b)
