= Paul Chelimo =

Kenyan-born American long-distance runner

Paul Kipkemoi Chelimo
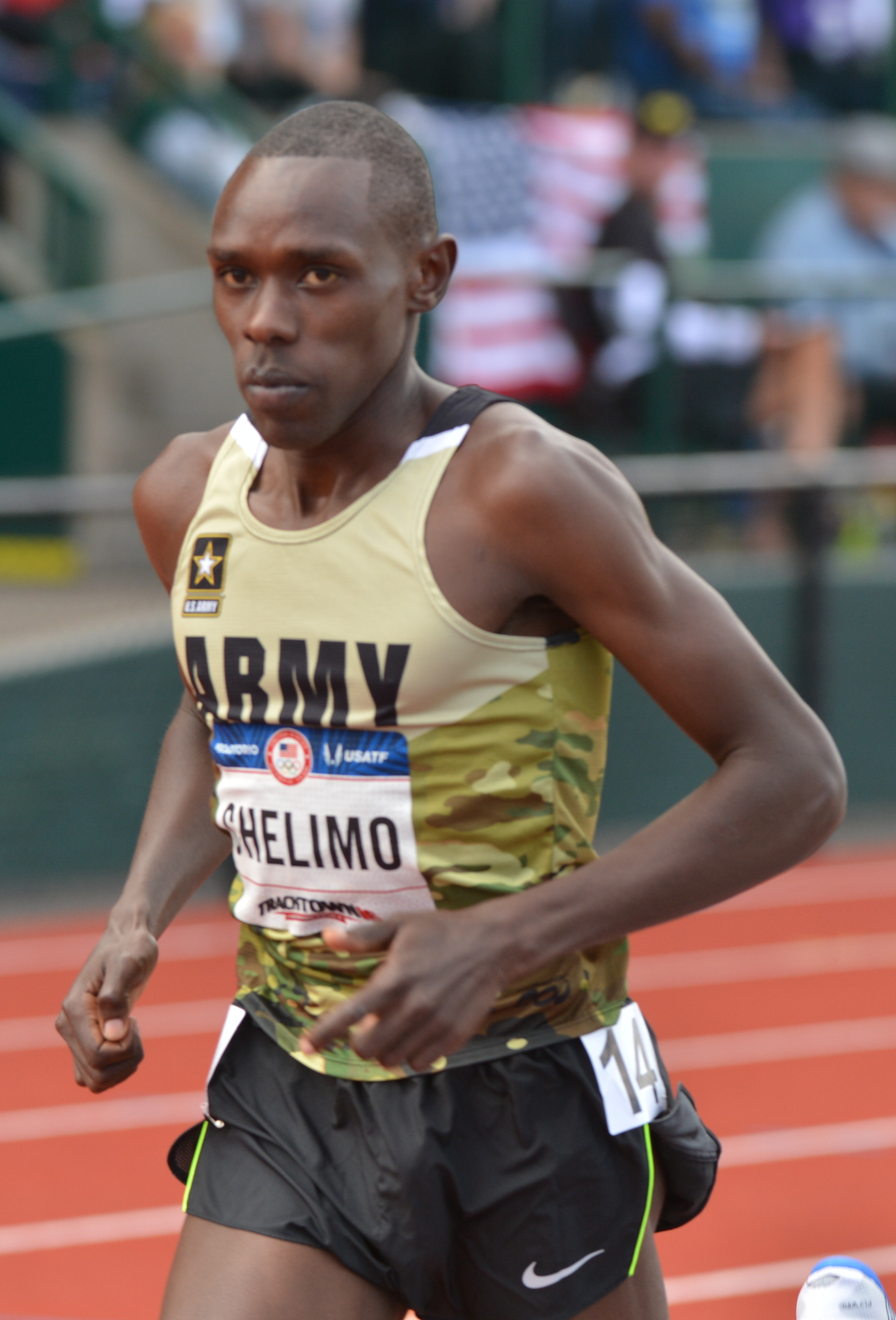
- Chelimo in 2016

Personal information
- Nationality: United States
- Born: October 27, 1990 (age 35) Iten, Kenya
- Home town: Colorado Springs, Colorado, U.S.
- Education: University of North Carolina at Greensboro
- Height: 174 cm (5 ft 9 in)
- Weight: 57 kg (126 lb)
- Website: www.paulchelimo.com

Sport
- Country: USA
- Sport: Athletics
- Event: 1500–10,000 m
- Club: U.S. Army WCAP

Achievements and titles
- Olympic finals: 2016; 5000 m, Silver; 2020; 5000 m, Bronze
- World finals: 2017; 5000 m, Bronze; 2019; 5000 m, 7th
- Personal bests: 1500 m: 3:39.33 (Zagreb 2016); Mile: 3:55.96 (Birmingham 2018); 3000 m: 7:31.57 (Doha 2017); 2-Mile: 8:07.59 (Palo Alto 2019); 5000 m: 12:57.55 (Brussels 2018); 10,000 m: 27:12.73 (London 2023); Half marathon: 62:19 (New York 2019)
Medal record
Men's athletics
Representing United States
Olympic Games
Silver medal – second place	2016 Rio de Janeiro	5000 m
Bronze medal – third place	2020 Tokyo	5000 m
World Championships
Bronze medal – third place	2017 London	5000 m
Representing Americas
Continental Cup
Gold medal – first place	2018 Ostrava	3000 m

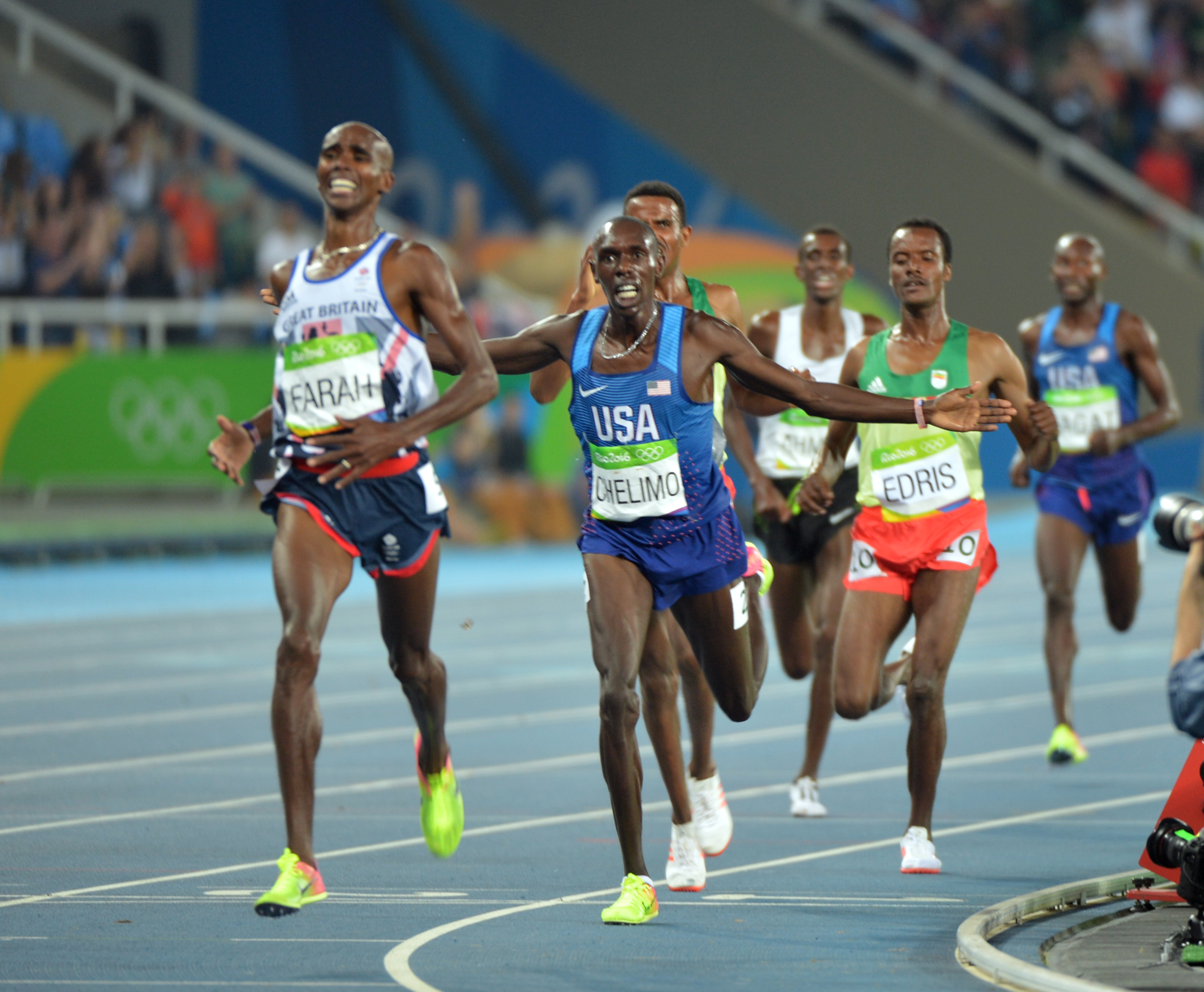
Chelimo finishing runner-up in the men's 5,000 m at the 2016 Olympic Games

Paul Kipkemoi Chelimo (born October 27, 1990) is a Kenyan born American track and field athlete. He is the 2016 Olympic silver medalist and the 2020 Olympic bronze medalist in the 5000 meters and is known for his success at the highest level of athletics and controversial racing tactics.

== Career ==
Born and brought up in Kenya, Chelimo initially went to the US in 2010 to run for Shorter College where he won the 3000 meters and was part of their winning distance medley relay team as Shorter won the 2011 NAIA National Indoor Championship. Later that year, Shorter won the NAIA Men's Outdoor Track and Field Championship as Chelimo won the 5000 meters and 10000 meters at the championships. He transferred to the University of North Carolina at Greensboro, taking 2nd place in the 2012 NCAA Championships 5000 meters and repeated the place in 2013.

Chelimo found his path to US citizenship by joining the United States Army through the Military Accessions Vital to National Interest (MAVNI) program as a water treatment specialist, then entering their World Class Athletic Program in 2014.

=== 2016 Olympics 5000m Silver ===
He represented the United States in the 3000 meters at the 2016 IAAF World Indoor Championships held in Portland, Oregon. He qualified to the World Championships by taking second place at the USA Indoor Track and Field Championships on the same track a week earlier, setting a personal record of 7:39.00.

Later in 2016, he finished third in the 5000 meters at the Olympic Trials. Running aggressively, Chelimo was the first to cover an early breakaway, which was eventually swallowed by another breakaway by previous trials winner Galen Rupp. Again, Chelimo led the last lap charge to run down Rupp, and after catching him, Chelimo held the lead onto the final straightaway. Chelimo was eventually run down by the sprint finish of 41-year-old Kenyan American Bernard Lagat, followed closely by Hassan Mead. But Chelimo was able to hold his position to the finish, beating Eric Jenkins to the line by 0.06 of a second and qualifying for the 2016 Summer Olympics.

Chelimo ran a personal best 13:19.54 in the prelim of the 5000 metres at the 2016 Summer Olympics. During the final he stayed near the lead the entire race, withstanding every attack three Ethiopian teammates were trying to throw against eventual winner Mo Farah. When Farah launched his final kick to win the race, Chelimo was the last to follow Farah, looking, for a few moments at the head of the final stretch, like he would be the only one able to outsprint Farah to the line. Farah pulled away and Chelimo followed him across the finish line. On the scoreboard, he was initially announced as the silver medal winner. Then his name was removed from the results, along with Canadian Mohammed Ahmed and Ethiopian Muktar Edris. Chelimo had exchanged elbows with both of them during the final turn. Video showed Chelimo stepping inside of the track. Hagos Gebrhiwet was elevated to second place, American Bernard Lagat was elevated to third. The United States appealed and the medal was reinstated, with Edris, the initiator of the contact remaining disqualified. He set a new personal best of 13:03.90 in the race. Chelimo's medal was the first for the US in the event since Bob Schul and Bill Dellinger in the 1964 Summer Olympics, held in Tokyo.

=== 2017 World Championships ===
Now an American star, he won the National Championships by seven seconds in record time. At the World Championships, it was a set of familiar faces on the last lap. This time though, Edris and his teammate Yomif Kejelcha got the jump on Farah and Chelimo going in to the final lap and Chelimo was running virtually even with Farah. In their pursuit of eventual winner Edris, both had to weave around Kejelcha then sprint for the line. In his last championship track race, Farah again beat Chelimo across the line, but this time it was much closer, barely a half meter separating the two, Chelimo getting bronze.

=== 2018 USA Championships and London Diamond League ===
Chelimo participated in the 3000m of the 2018 USA Indoor Track and Field Championships held in Albuquerque, New Mexico. He won the race with a time of 7:57.88, thereby qualifying for the 2018 World Championships. In the heats of the World Indoor Championships, he was one of many victims of a spate of disqualifications at that meet. After appeal, he did not get to run in the final. In June, Chelimo won his second outdoor U.S. title in the 5000m at the 2018 USA Outdoor Track and Field Championships, and, later that summer, won the London Diamond League also at the 5000m distance.

=== 2021 Tokyo Olympics 5000 m Bronze ===
Chelimo won his third U.S. outdoor title in the 5000m in a dramatic three-man sprint finish where he controversially drifted to lane four to prevent his competitors from overtaking him. In another notable finish, Chelimo narrowly out-leaned Nicholas Kimeli for the bronze medal in the Tokyo 2020 Olympic 5000m. Chelimo dedicated the performance to his brother, who suddenly died earlier in the year.

=== 2023 World Championships ===
After his success in 2021 and relatively poor season in 2022, where he finished only 11th in the U.S. Championships 5000m, Chelimo once again qualified for the World Championships with his second-place finish in the U.S. Championships. He also competed in the 10,000m and placed fifth. At the 2023 World Athletics Championships in Budapest, Chelimo placed 15th in the 5000m.

=== 2024 Olympic Cycle ===
Chelimo competed in his first marathon at the 2024 U.S. Olympic Marathon Trials in hopes of qualifying for his third Olympics. He dropped out mid-way through the race. In June, Chelimo took his second attempt at qualifying for the Olympics, this time in the 10,000m. He placed tenth. In his third and final attempt at Olympic qualification, Chelimo placed twelfth in his heat of the 5,000m and failed to advance to the final.

== Major competitions ==
Year	Competition	Venue	Position	Event	Notes
Representing United States
2016	U.S. Olympic Trials	Eugene, Oregon	3rd	5000 m	13:35.92
2016	Olympic Games	Rio de Janeiro, Brazil	2nd	5000 m	13:03.90
2017	World Championships	London, United Kingdom	3rd	5000 m	13:33.30
2019	World Championships	Doha, Qatar	7th	5000 m	13:04.60
2021	U.S. Olympic Trials	Eugene, Oregon	1st	5000 m	13:26.82
2021	Olympic Games	Tokyo, Japan	3rd	5000 m	12:59.05
2023	World Championships	Budapest, Hungary	15th	5000 m	13:30.88
