= Bill Tavares =

American luger (born 1963)

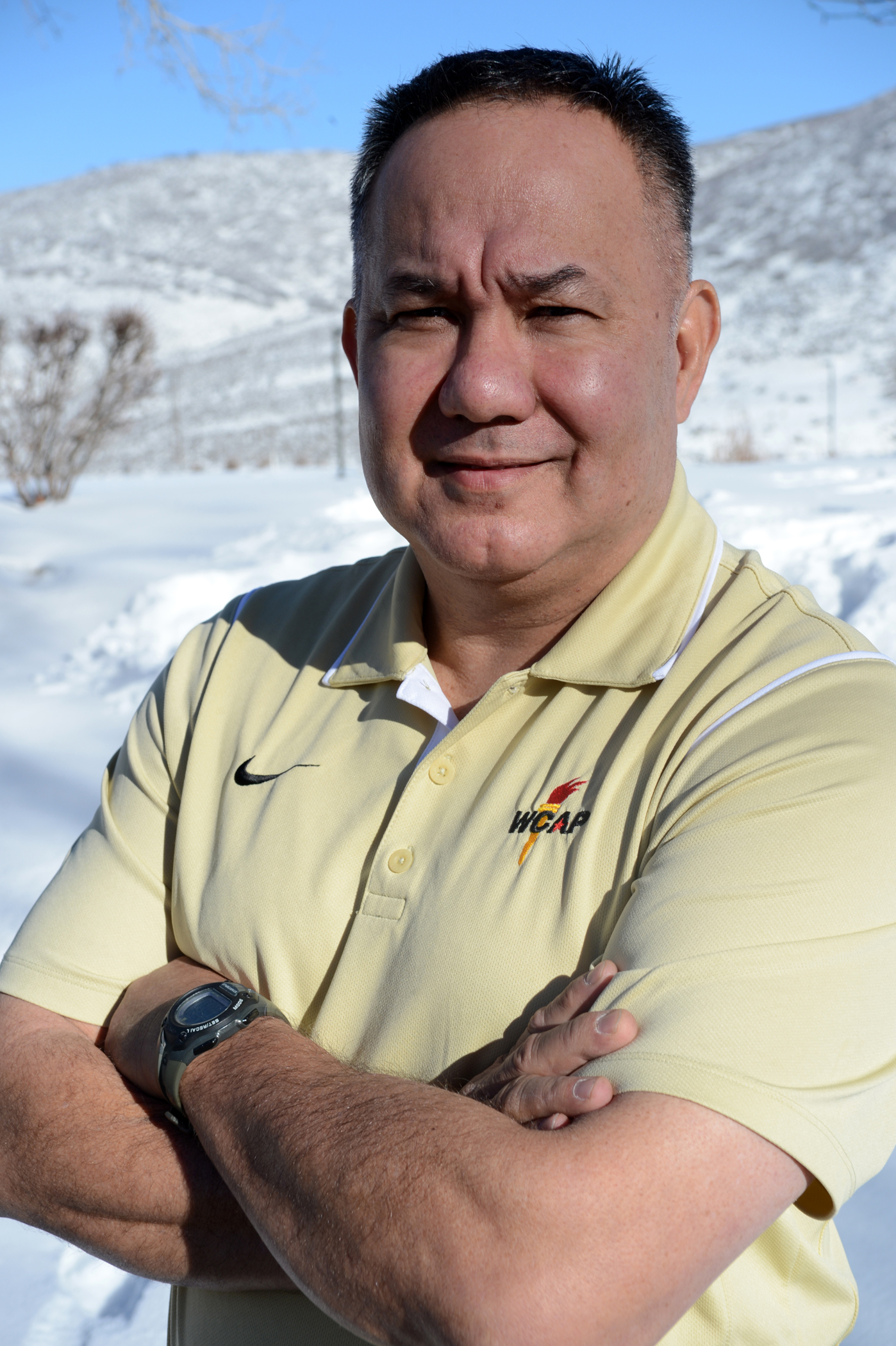
- Bill Tavares in 2013

Personal information
- Born: April 16, 1963 (age 63) Guam
- Height: 1.70 m (5 ft 7 in)
- Weight: 68 kg (150 lb)

Sport
- Sport: Luge
- Club: U.S. Army

William S. Tavares (born April 16, 1963) is a retired American luger. He competed in doubles at the 1992 Winter Olympics, alongside Wendell Suckow, and finished ninth. He was a second lieutenant in the National Guard of the United States in 1992, and later became career military. In May 1999 he was appointed as the main coach of the US Olympic women's bobsled team.
