= 2018–19 FIS Ski Jumping Continental Cup =

Ski-jumping competition series

Continental Cup 2018/19
Discipline	Men	Women
Beskidy Tour	(Austria) Philip Aschenwald	—
Summer	(Austria) Philip Aschenwald	(Germany) Katharina Althaus
Winter	(Austria) Clemens Aigner	(Slovenia) Katra Komar

Competition
Edition	17th (summer), 28th (winter)	11th (summer), 15th (winter)
Locations	8 (summer), 14 (winter)	1 (summer), 4 (winter)
Individual	13 (summer), 28 (winter)	2 (summer), 8 (winter)
Cancelled	2 (winter)	.
Rescheduled	2 (winter)	.

The 2018/19 FIS Ski Jumping Continental Cup is the 28th in a row (26th official) Continental Cup winter season in ski jumping for men and the 15th for ladies. This is also the 17th summer continental cup season for men and 11th for ladies.

Other competitive circuits this season include the World Cup, Grand Prix, FIS Cup, FIS Race and Alpen Cup.

== Map of continental cup hosts ==
All 21 locations hosting continental cup events in summer (8 for men / 1 for ladies) and in winter (14 for men / 4 for ladies) this season.

2018–19 FIS Ski Jumping Continental Cup (Europe)	2018–19 FIS Ski Jumping Continental Cup (Asia) 2018–19 FIS Ski Jumping Continental Cup (North America)

Men Ladies Men & Ladies

== Men's Individual ==
Individual men's events in the Continental Cup history

Total	F	L	N	Winners	Competition
197	—	106	91		Summer
912	4	504	404		Winter

after large hill event in Chaykovsky (24 March 2019)

=== Summer ===
Num	Season	Date	Place	Hill	Size	Winner	Second	Third	Yellow bib	Ref.
185	1	7 July 2018	(Slovenia) Kranj	Bauhenk HS109	N _{086}	(Switzerland) Killian Peier	(Russia) Evgeniy Klimov	(Germany) Felix Hoffmann	(Switzerland) Killian Peier	
186	2	8 July 2018	(Slovenia) Kranj	Bauhenk HS109	NH	(Switzerland) Killian Peier	(Russia) Evgeniy Klimov	(Austria) Stefan Huber	(Switzerland) Killian Peier	
187	3	17 August 2018	(Poland) Szczyrk	Skalite HS106	NH	(Austria) Philipp Aschenwald	(Russia) Ilmir Hazetdinov	(Czech Republic) Lukáš Hlava	(Switzerland) Killian Peier	
188	4	18 August 2018	(Poland) Wisła	Malinka HS134	L _{100}	(Austria) Philipp Aschenwald	(Poland) Aleksander Zniszczoł	(Slovenia) Žak Mogel	(Austria) Philipp Aschenwald	
189	5	19 August 2018	(Czech Republic) Frenštát pod Radhoštěm	Areal Horečky HS106	NH	(Czech Republic) Lukáš Hlava	(Austria) Florian Altenburger	(Austria) Philipp Aschenwald	(Austria) Philipp Aschenwald	
30th Beskidy Tour in total / 2nd Beskydy Tour Continental Cup Overall (17–19 August)						(Austria) Philipp Aschenwald	(Czech Republic) Lukáš Hlava	(Slovenia) Žak Mogel		
190	6	8 September 2018	(Austria) Stams	Brunnentalschanze HS115	LH	(Austria) Philipp Aschenwald	(Austria) Stefan Kraft	(Austria) Clemens Aigner	(Austria) Philipp Aschenwald	
191	7	9 September 2018	(Austria) Stams	Brunnentalschanze HS115	LH	(Switzerland) Killian Peier	(Austria) Philipp Aschenwald	(Austria) Daniel Huber	(Austria) Philipp Aschenwald	
192	8	15 September 2018	(Norway) Oslo	Midtstubakken HS106	NH	(Austria) Philipp Aschenwald	(Slovenia) Žak Mogel	(Norway) Andreas Stjernen	(Austria) Philipp Aschenwald	
193	9	16 September 2018	(Norway) Oslo	Midtstubakken HS106	N _{091}	(Austria) Philipp Aschenwald	(Germany) David Siegel	(Germany) Moritz Bär	(Austria) Philipp Aschenwald	
194	10	22 September 2018	(Poland) Zakopane	Wielka Krokiew HS140	LH	(Austria) Stefan Huber	(Switzerland) Killian Peier	(Germany) Moritz Bär	(Austria) Philipp Aschenwald	
195	11	23 September 2018	(Poland) Zakopane	Wielka Krokiew HS140	LH	(Austria) Philipp Aschenwald	(Austria) Stefan Huber	(Slovenia) Žak Mogel	(Austria) Philipp Aschenwald	
196	12	29 September 2018	(Germany) Klingenthal	Vogtland Arena HS140	LH	(Russia) Dimitry Vassiliev	(Slovenia) Žak Mogel	(Germany) David Siegel	(Austria) Philipp Aschenwald	
197	13	30 September 2018	(Germany) Klingenthal	Vogtland Arena HS140	L _{106}	(Poland) Aleksander Zniszczoł	(Austria) Ulrich Wohlgenannt	(Germany) Andreas Wank	(Austria) Philipp Aschenwald	

=== Winter ===
Num	Season	Date	Place	Hill	Size	Winner	Second	Third	Yellow bib	Ref.
885	1	8 December 2018	(Norway) Lillehammer	Lysgårdsbakken HS140	L _{478}	(Norway) Marius Lindvik	(Germany) Felix Hoffman	(Norway) Robin Pedersen	(Norway) Marius Lindvik	
886	2	9 December 2019	(Norway) Lillehammer	Lysgårdsbakken HS140	LH	(Norway) Marius Lindvik	(Germany) Constantin Schmid	(Austria) Marcus Schiffner	(Norway) Marius Lindvik	
887	3	15 December 2018	(Finland) Ruka	Rukatunturi HS142	LH	(Norway) Robin Pedersen	(Poland) Aleksander Zniszczoł	(Slovenia) Robert Kranjec	(Norway) Marius Lindvik	
888	4	16 December 2018	(Finland) Ruka	Rukatunturi HS142	LH	(Norway) Robin Pedersen	(Germany) Felix Hoffmann	(Germany) Martin Hamann	(Norway) Robin Pedersen	
889	5	27 December 2018	(Switzerland) Engelberg	Gross-Titlis-Schanze HS140	LH	(Austria) Markus Schiffner	(Slovenia) Rok Justin	(Slovenia) Nejc Dežman	(Norway) Robin Pedersen	
890	6	28 December 2018	(Switzerland) Engelberg	Gross-Titlis-Schanze HS140	LH	(Austria) Philipp Aschenwald	(Slovenia) Anže Lanišek	(Austria) Markus Schiffner	(Norway) Robin Pedersen	
891	7	6 January 2019	(Germany) Klingenthal	Vogtland Arena HS140	LH	(Slovenia) Tilen Bartol	(Norway) Andreas Granerud Buskum	(Norway) Marius Lindvik (Germany) Pius Paschke	(Norway) Marius Lindvik	
892	8	6 January 2019	(Germany) Klingenthal	Vogtland Arena HS140	LH	(Germany) Moritz Baer	(Slovenia) Žak Mogel	(Norway) Marius Lindvik	(Norway) Marius Lindvik	
893	9	12 January 2019	(Austria) Bischofshofen	Paul-Ausserleitner-Schanze HS142	LH	(Austria) Clemens Aigner	(Slovenia) Žiga Jelar	(Germany) Felix Hoffmann	(Norway) Marius Lindvik	
894	10	13 January 2019	(Austria) Bischofshofen	Paul-Ausserleitner-Schanze HS142	LH	(Slovenia) Žiga Jelar	(Austria) Clemens Aigner	(Germany) Severin Freund	(Norway) Marius Lindvik	
895	11	18 January 2019	(Japan) Sapporo	Okurayama HS137	LH	(Austria) Clemens Aigner	(Germany) Andreas Wank	(Slovenia) Nejc Dežman	(Norway) Marius Lindvik	
896	12	19 January 2019	(Japan) Sapporo	Okurayama HS137	LH	(Austria) Clemens Aigner	(Czech Republic) Tomáš Vančura	(Germany) Martin Hamann	(Austria) Clemens Aigner	
897	13	20 January 2019	(Japan) Sapporo	Okurayama HS137	LH	(Austria) Clemens Aigner	(Norway) Robin Pedersen	(Germany) Martin Hamann	(Austria) Clemens Aigner	
898	14	26 January 2019	(Slovenia) Planica	Bloudkova velikanka HS138	LH	(Slovenia) Bor Pavlovčič	(Norway) Andreas Granerud Buskum	(Slovenia) Jurij Tepeš	(Austria) Clemens Aigner	
899	15	27 January 2019	(Slovenia) Planica	Bloudkova velikanka HS138	LH	(Germany) Martin Hamann	(Slovenia) Bor Pavlovčič	(Norway) Andreas Granerud Buskum	(Austria) Clemens Aigner	
		1 February 2019	(Turkey) Erzurum	Kiremitliktepe HS140	LH	rescheduled in Sapporo on 18 January 2019				
		2 February 2019	(Turkey) Erzurum	Kiremitliktepe HS140	LH	rescheduled in Iron Mountain on 8 February 2019				
900	16	8 February 2019	(United States) Iron Mountain	Pine Mountain Ski Jump HS133	LH	(Germany) Pius Paschke	(Norway) Robin Pedersen	(Norway) Thomas Aasen Markeng	(Norway) Robin Pedersen	
901	17	9 February 2019	(United States) Iron Mountain	Pine Mountain Ski Jump HS133	LH	(Norway) Thomas Aasen Markeng	(Austria) Stefan Huber	(Austria) Markus Schiffner	(Norway) Robin Pedersen	
902	18	10 February 2019	(United States) Iron Mountain	Pine Mountain Ski Jump HS133	LH	(Norway) Marius Lindvik	(Austria) Markus Schiffner	(Slovenia) Žak Mogel	(Norway) Robin Pedersen	
903	19	15 February 2019	(Germany) Oberstdorf	Schattenbergschanze HS137	LH	(Austria) Clemens Aigner	(Germany) Felix Hoffmann	(Germany) Pius Paschke	(Austria) Clemens Aigner	
904	20	16 February 2019	(Germany) Oberstdorf	Schattenbergschanze HS137	LH	(Austria) Clemens Aigner	(Slovenia) Tilen Bartol	(Germany) Pius Paschke	(Austria) Clemens Aigner	
905	21	23 February 2019	(Germany) Brotterode	Inselbergschanze HS117	LH	(Austria) Clemens Aigner	(Poland) Paweł Wąsek	(Austria) Ulrich Wohlgennant	(Austria) Clemens Aigner	
906	22	24 February 2019	(Germany) Brotterode	Inselbergschanze HS117	LH	(Norway) Marius Lindvik	(Austria) Clemens Aigner	(Slovenia) Žak Mogel	(Austria) Clemens Aigner	
907	23	2 March 2019	(Norway) Rena	Renabakkene HS139	LH	(Norway) Marius Lindvik	(Norway) Robin Pedersen	(Austria) Clemens Aigner	(Austria) Clemens Aigner	
908	24	3 March 2019	(Norway) Rena	Renabakkene HS139	LH	(Norway) Marius Lindvik	(Norway) Fredrik Villumstad	(Germany) Martin Hamann	(Austria) Clemens Aigner	
909	25	16 March 2019	(Poland) Zakopane	Wielka Krokiew HS140	LH	(Austria) Stefan Huber	(Slovenia) Bor Pavlovčič	(Germany) Felix Hoffmann	(Austria) Clemens Aigner	
910	26	17 March 2019	(Poland) Zakopane	Wielka Krokiew HS140	LH	(Poland) Aleksander Zniszczoł	(Slovenia) Jaka Hvala	(Slovenia) Žak Mogel	(Austria) Clemens Aigner	
911	27	23 March 2019	(Russia) Chaykovsky	Snezhinka HS102	N _{404}	(Poland) Aleksander Zniszczoł	(Poland) Andrzej Stękała	(Norway) Andreas Granerud Buskum	(Austria) Clemens Aigner	
912	28	24 March 2019	(Russia) Chaykovsky	Snezhinka HS140	L _{504}	(Poland) Aleksander Zniszczoł	(Poland) Andrzej Stękała	(Norway) Fredrik Villumstad	(Austria) Clemens Aigner	

== Women's Individual ==
Individual women's events in the Continental Cup history

Total	L	N	M	Winners	Competition
55	—	44	11		Summer
160	13	132	15		Winter

after large hill event in Brotterode (24 February 2019)

=== Summer ===
Num	Season	Date	Place	Hill	Size	Winner	Second	Third	Yellow bib	Ref.
54	1	15 September 2018	(Norway) Oslo	Midtstubakken HS106	N _{043}	(Germany) Katharina Althaus	(Japan) Kaori Iwabuchi	(Germany) Juliane Seyfarth	(Germany) Katharina Althaus	
55	2	16 September 2018	(Norway) Oslo	Midtstubakken HS106	N _{044}	(Germany) Katharina Althaus	(Japan) Kaori Iwabuchi	(Germany) Ramona Straub	(Germany) Katharina Althaus	

=== Winter ===
Num	Season	Date	Place	Hill	Size	Winner	Second	Third	Yellow bib	Ref.
155	1	14 December 2018	(Norway) Notodden	Tveitanbakken HS100	N _{129}	(Germany) Selina Freitag	(Austria) Elisabeth Raudaschl	(South Korea) Park Guy-lim	(Germany) Selina Freitag	
156	2	15 December 2018	(Norway) Notodden	Tveitanbakken HS100	NH	(Austria) Claudia Purker	(Russia) Anna Shpyneva	(Germany) Agnes Reisch	(Germany) Selina Freitag	
157	3	19 January 2019	(Slovenia) Planica	Normal hill HS102	NH	(Slovenia) Jerneja Brecl	(Slovenia) Katra Komar	(Austria) Sophie Sorchag	(Germany) Selina Freitag	
158	4	20 January 2019	(Slovenia) Planica	Normal hill HS102	N _{132}	(Slovenia) Jerneja Brecl	(Poland) Kamila Karpiel	(Slovenia) Katra Komar	(Slovenia) Jerneja Brecl	
159	5	23 February 2019	(Germany) Brotterode	Inselbergschanze HS117	L _{012}	(Germany) Pauline Heßler	(Poland) Kamila Karpiel (Austria) Marita Kramer		(Slovenia) Jerneja Brecl	
160	6	24 February 2019	(Germany) Brotterode	Inselbergschanze HS117	L _{013}	(Slovenia) Katra Komar	(Austria) Marita Kramer	(Germany) Pauline Heßler	(Slovenia) Katra Komar	

== Men's standings ==
=== Summer ===
Rank	after 13 events	Points
1	(Austria) Philipp Aschenwald	814
2	(Slovenia) Žak Mogel	513
3	(Switzerland) Killian Peier	448
4	(Poland) Aleksander Zniszczoł	410
5	(Germany) David Siegel	398

=== Winter ===
Rank	after 28 events	Points
1	(Austria) Clemens Aigner	977
2	(Poland) Aleksander Zniszczol	895
3	(Norway) Marius Lindvik	863
4	(Norway) Robin Pedersen	754
5	(Germany) Pius Paschke	744

=== Beskidy Tour ===
Rank	after 3 events	Points
1	(Austria) Philipp Aschenwald	795.6
2	(Czech Republic) Lukáš Hlava	758.7
3	(Slovenia) Žak Mogel	747.5
4	(Poland) Aleksander Zniszczoł	742.8
5	(Russia) Ilmir Hazetdinov	731.1

== Ladies' standings ==
=== Summer ===
Rank	after 2 events	Points
1	(Germany) Katharina Althaus	200
2	(Japan) Kaori Iwabuchi	160
3	(Germany) Juliane Seyfarth	110
	(Germany) Ramona Straub	110
5	(Japan) Yūka Setō	85

=== Winter ===
Rank	after 6 events	Points
1	(Slovenia) Katra Komar	246
2	(Poland) Kamila Karpiel	239
3	(Austria) Elisabeth Raudaschl	201
4	(Slovenia) Jerneja Brecl	200
5	(Austria) Claudia Purker	192

== Europa Cup vs. Continental Cup ==
Last two seasons of Europa Cup in 1991/92 and 1992/93 are recognized as first two Continental Cup seasons by International Ski Federation, although Continental Cup under this name officially started first season in 1993/94 season.
