= 2018–19 FIS Cup (ski jumping) =

FIS Cup 2018/19
Discipline	Men	Women
Overall	(Germany) Fabian Seidl	(Romania) Daniela Haralambie

Competition
Edition	14th	7th
Locations	9	6
Individual	18	12
Cancelled	4	0

The 2018/19 FIS Cup (ski jumping) was the 14th FIS Cup season in ski jumping for men and the 7th for women.

Other competitive circuits that season included the World Cup, Grand Prix, Continental Cup, FIS Race, and Alpen Cup.

== Calendar ==
=== Men ===
#	Date	Place	Hill	Size	Winner	Second	Third	Yellow bib	R.
1	7 July 2018	(Austria) Villach	Villacher Alpenarena HS98	NH	(Germany) Justin Nietzel	(Switzerland) Luca Egloff	(Slovenia) Žak Mogel	(Germany) Justin Nietzel	
2	8 July 2018	(Austria) Villach	Villacher Alpenarena HS98	NH	(Switzerland) Luca Egloff	(Switzerland) Gregor Deschwanden	(Germany) Fabian Seidl	(Switzerland) Luca Egloff	
3	14 July 2018	(Poland) Szczyrk	Skalite HS106	NH	(Germany) Maximilian Steiner	(Japan) Naoki Nakamura	(Germany) Justin Nietzel	(Germany) Justin Nietzel	
4	15 July 2018	(Poland) Szczyrk	Skalite HS106	NH	(Germany) Justin Nietzel	(Austria) Markus Rupitsch	(Austria) Thomas Hofer	(Germany) Justin Nietzel	
	18 August 2019	(Russia) Sochi	RusSki Gorki HS106	NH	organizational and technical reasons				
	19 August 2019	(Russia) Sochi	RusSki Gorki HS106	NH	organizational and technical reasons				
5	15 September 2018	(Romania) Râșnov	Trambulina Valea Cărbunării HS97	NH	(Japan) Ren Nikaido	(Germany) Philipp Raimund	(Austria) Jan Hörl	(Germany) Justin Nietzel	
6	16 September 2018	(Romania) Râșnov	Trambulina Valea Cărbunării HS97	NH	(Japan) Ren Nikaido	(Germany) Johannes Schubert	(Germany) Dominik Mayländer	(Germany) Justin Nietzel	
7	14 December 2018	(Norway) Notodden	Tveitanbakken HS100	NH	(Austria) Stefan Rainer	(Austria) Julian Wienerroither	(Austria) Maximilian Lienher	(Germany) Justin Nietzel	
8	15 December 2018	(Norway) Notodden	Tveitanbakken HS100	NH	(Germany) Fabian Seidl	(Austria) Stefan Rainer	(Norway) Joakim Aune	(Germany) Fabian Seidl	
9	19 December 2018	(United States) Park City	Utah Olympic Park HS100	NH	(Switzerland) Luca Egloff	(Japan) Hiroaki Watanabe	(United States) Casey Larson	(Germany) Fabian Seidl	
10	20 December 2018	(United States) Park City	Utah Olympic Park HS100	NH	(Switzerland) Luca Egloff	(Japan) Hiroaki Watanabe	(United States) Casey Larson	(Switzerland) Luca Egloff	
11	12 January 2019	(Poland) Zakopane	Wielka Krokiew HS140	LH	(Austria) Claudio Mörth	(Austria) Maximilian Lienher	(Czech Republic) Dušan Doležel	(Switzerland) Luca Egloff	
12	13 January 2019	(Poland) Zakopane	Wielka Krokiew HS140	LH	(Austria) David Haagen	(Slovenia) Jaka Hvala	(Slovenia) Cene Prevc	(Switzerland) Luca Egloff	
13	19 January 2019	(Slovenia) Planica	Normal hill HS102	NH	(Slovenia) Cene Prevc	(Austria) Stefan Huber	(Slovenia) Jaka Hvala	(Switzerland) Luca Egloff	
14	20 January 2019	(Slovenia) Planica	Normal hill HS102	NH	(Slovenia) Cene Prevc	(Slovenia) Jaka Hvala	(Czech Republic) Vojtech Stursa	(Switzerland) Luca Egloff	
	30 January 2019	(Turkey) Erzurum	Kiremitliktepe HS109	NH	financial problems				
	31 January 2019	(Turkey) Erzurum	Kiremitliktepe HS109	NH	financial problems				
15	9 February 2019	(Germany) Rastbüchl	Baptist Kitzlinger Schanze HS78	MH	(Germany) Andreas Wank	(Germany) Adrian Sell	(Austria) Julian Wienerroither	(Switzerland) Luca Egloff	
16	10 February 2019	(Germany) Rastbüchl	Baptist Kitzlinger Schanze HS78	MH	(Germany) Andreas Wank	(Germany) Sebastian Rombach	(Germany) Johannes Schubert	(Switzerland) Luca Egloff	
17	23 February 2019	(Austria) Villach	Villacher Alpenarena HS98	NH	(Germany) Andreas Wank	(Austria) Stefan Rainer	(Germany) Johannes Schubert	(Germany) Fabian Seidl	
18	24 February 2019	(Austria) Villach	Villacher Alpenarena HS98	NH	(Germany) Andreas Wank	(Slovenia) Blaž Pavlič	(Austria) Maximilian Steiner	(Germany) Fabian Seidl	

=== Ladies ===
#	Date	Place	Hill	Size	Winner	Second	Third	Yellow bib	R.
1	7 July 2018	(Austria) Villach	Villacher Alpenarena HS98	NH	(Austria) Chiara Hölzl	(Slovenia) Ema Klinec	(Romania) Daniela Haralambie	(Austria) Chiara Hölzl	
2	8 July 2018	(Austria) Villach	Villacher Alpenarena HS98	NH	(Austria) Chiara Hölzl	(Slovenia) Ema Klinec	(Slovenia) Nika Križnar	(Austria) Chiara Hölzl	
3	14 July 2018	(Poland) Szczyrk	Skalite HS106	NH	(Romania) Daniela Haralambie	(Japan) Yūka Setō	(Poland) Kinga Rajda	(Austria) Chiara Hölzl	
4	15 July 2018	(Poland) Szczyrk	Skalite HS106	NH	(Romania) Daniela Haralambie	(Austria) Elisabeth Raudaschl	(Poland) Kinga Rajda	(Romania) Daniela Haralambie	
5	15 September 2018	(Romania) Râșnov	Trambulina Valea Cărbunării HS97	NH	(Romania) Daniela Haralambie	(Poland) Anna Twardosz	(Romania) Andreea Diana Trâmbițaș	(Romania) Daniela Haralambie	
6	16 September 2018	(Romania) Râșnov	Trambulina Valea Cărbunării HS97	NH	(Romania) Daniela Haralambie	(Poland) Anna Twardosz	(Romania) Andreea Diana Trâmbițaș	(Romania) Daniela Haralambie	
7	19 December 2018	(United States) Park City	Utah Olympic Park HS100	NH	(Canada) Natalie Eilers	(Canada) Abigail Strate	(Canada) Natasha Bodnarchuk	(Romania) Daniela Haralambie	
8	20 December 2018	(United States) Park City	Utah Olympic Park HS100	NH	(Canada) Taylor Henrich	(Canada) Natalie Eilers	(Canada) Natasha Bodnarchuk	(Romania) Daniela Haralambie	
9	9 February 2019	(Germany) Rastbüchl	Baptist Kitzlinger Schanze HS78	MH	(Germany) Agnes Reisch	(Germany) Arantxa Lancho	(Austria) Elisabeth Raudaschl	(Romania) Daniela Haralambie	
10	10 February 2019	(Germany) Rastbüchl	Baptist Kitzlinger Schanze HS78	MH	(Germany) Agnes Reisch	(Austria) Elisabeth Raudaschl	(Germany) Arantxa Lancho	(Romania) Daniela Haralambie	
11	23 February 2019	(Austria) Villach	Villacher Alpenarena HS98	NH	(Italy) Giada Tomaselli	(Italy) Veronica Gianmoena	(Italy) Annika Sieff	(Romania) Daniela Haralambie	
12	24 February 2019	(Austria) Villach	Villacher Alpenarena HS98	NH	(Italy) Veronica Gianmoena	(Italy) Giada Tomaselli	(Austria) Vanessa Moharitsch	(Romania) Daniela Haralambie	

== Overall standings ==
=== Men ===
Rank	after all 18 events	Points
1	(Germany) Fabian Seidl	526
2	(Switzerland) Luca Egloff	458
3	(Germany) Johannes Schubert	452
4	(Austria) Stefan Rainer	435
5	(Germany) Justin Nietzel	417

=== Ladies ===
Rank	after all 12 events	Points
1	(Romania) Daniela Haralambie	486
2	(Austria) Elisabeth Raudaschl	304
3	(Canada) Abigail Strate	225
4	(Germany) Agnes Reich (Austria) Chiara Hölzl (Romania) Andreea Diana Trâmbițaș	200
