= 2018–19 FIS Race (ski jumping) =

Ski jumping competition

FIS Race 2018/19

The 2018/19 FIS Race (ski jumping) is the 20th FIS Race regular season as the fourth level of ski jumping competition since 1999/00. Although even before the world cup and in the old days FIS Race events were all top level organized competitions.

Other competitive circuits this season included the World Cup, Grand Prix, Continental Cup, FIS Cup and Alpen Cup.

== Calendar ==
=== Men ===
Season	Date	Place	Hill	Size	Winner	Second	Third	Ref.
1	14 September 2018	(Romania) Râșnov	Trambulina Valea Cărbunării HS71	MH	(United States) Andrew Urlaub	(Romania) Radu Mihai Pacurar	(Czech Republic) Radek Selcer	
2	8 March 2019	(Japan) Sapporo	Miyanomori HS100	NH	(Japan) Keiichi Sato	(Japan) Reruhi Shimizu	(Japan) Hiroaki Watanabe	
3	10 March 2019	(Japan) Sapporo	Ōkurayama HS137	LH	(Japan) Yumu Harada	(Japan) Taku Takeuchi	(Japan) Tomofumi Naito	
4	16 March 2019	(Canada) Whistler	Whistler Olympic Park HS106	NH	(Canada) Nathaniel Mah	(Canada) Nigel Lauchlan	(United Kingdom) Sam Bolton	
5	17 March 2019	(Canada) Whistler	Whistler Olympic Park HS140	LH	(Canada) Nathaniel Mah	(United Kingdom) Sam Bolton	(United States) Beckett Ledger	

=== Ladies ===
Season	Date	Place	Hill	Size	Winner	Second	Third	Ref.
1	14 September 2018	(Romania) Râșnov	Trambulina Valea Cărbunării HS71	MH	(Italy) Annika Sief	(Ukraine) Vitalina Herasymiuk	(United States) Annika Belshaw	
2	8 March 2019	(Japan) Sapporo	Miyanomori HS100	NH	(Japan) Misaki Shigeno	(Japan) Haruka Iwasa	(Japan) Ayaka Igarashi	
3	10 March 2019	(Japan) Sapporo	Ōkurayama HS137	LH	(Italy) Annika Sief	(Ukraine) Vitalina Herasymiuk	(United States) Annika Belshaw	
4	16 March 2019	(Canada) Whistler	Whistler Olympic Park HS106	NH	(United States) Anna Hoffmann	(United States) Annika Belshaw	(United States) Paige Jones	
5	17 March 2019	(Canada) Whistler	Whistler Olympic Park HS140	LH	(United States) Anna Hoffmann	(United States) Annika Belshaw	(Canada) Nicole Maurer	
