= 2018 FIS Ski Jumping Grand Prix =

International ski jumping competition

Grand Prix 2018
Discipline	Men	Women
Overall	(Russia) Evgeniy Klimov	(Japan) Sara Takanashi
Nations Cup	Poland	Japan

Competition
Edition	25th	7th
Locations	7	4
Individual	9	5
Team	1	—
Mixed	1	1
Cancelled	2	1

The 2018 FIS Ski Jumping Grand Prix was the 25th Summer Grand Prix season in ski jumping on plastic for men and the 7th for ladies.

Other competitive circuits this season included the World Cup, Continental Cup, FIS Cup, FIS Race and Alpen Cup.

== Map of grand prix hosts ==
All ten scheduled locations for men (9) and for ladies (5) in this season. Only Almaty was canceled before the season start.

2018 FIS Ski Jumping Grand Prix (Europe)	2018 FIS Ski Jumping Grand Prix (Asia)

== Calendar ==
=== Men ===
Num	Season	Date	Place	Hill	Size	Winner	Second	Third	Yellow bib	Ref.
187	1	22 July 2018	(Poland) Wisła	Malinka HS134 (night)	LH	(Poland) Kamil Stoch	(Poland) Piotr Żyła	(Norway) Halvor Egner Granerud	(Poland) Kamil Stoch	
188	2	28 July 2018	(Germany) Hinterzarten	Rothaus-Schanze HS108	NH	(Poland) Kamil Stoch	(Germany) Karl Geiger	(Switzerland) Killian Peier	(Poland) Kamil Stoch	
189	3	4 August 2018	(Switzerland) Einsiedeln	Andreas Küttel Schanze HS117	LH	(Poland) Kamil Stoch (Poland) Piotr Żyła		(Russia) Evgeniy Klimov	(Poland) Kamil Stoch	
190	4	11 August 2018	(France) Courchevel	Tremplin du Praz HS135 (night)	LH	(Russia) Evgeniy Klimov	(Austria) Daniel Huber	(Czech Republic) Roman Koudelka	(Poland) Kamil Stoch	
191	5	24 August 2018	(Japan) Hakuba	Olympic Ski Jumps HS131 (night)	LH	(Japan) Ryōyū Kobayashi	(Russia) Evgeniy Klimov	(Japan) Daiki Itō	(Poland) Kamil Stoch	
192	6	25 August 2018	(Japan) Hakuba	Olympic Ski Jumps HS131	LH	(Japan) Ryōyū Kobayashi	(Russia) Evgeniy Klimov	(Austria) Daniel Huber	(Russia) Evgeniy Klimov	
		9 September 2018	(Russia) Chaykovsky	Snezhinka HS140	LH	strong wind				
193	7	22 September 2018	(Romania) Râșnov	Trambulina Valea Cărbunării HS97	NH	(Germany) Karl Geiger	(Poland) Piotr Żyła	(Russia) Evgeniy Klimov	(Russia) Evgeniy Klimov	
194	8	23 September 2018	(Romania) Râșnov	Trambulina Valea Cărbunării HS97	NH	(Germany) Karl Geiger	(Russia) Evgeniy Klimov	(Poland) Dawid Kubacki	(Russia) Evgeniy Klimov	
195	9	30 September 2018	(Austria) Hinzenbach	Aigner-Schanze HS90	NH	(Austria) Daniel Huber	(Switzerland) Killian Peier	(Germany) Karl Geiger	(Russia) Evgeniy Klimov	
		3 October 2018	(Germany) Klingenthal	Vogtland Arena HS140	LH	strong wind				

=== Ladies ===
Num	Season	Date	Place	Hill	Size	Winner	Second	Third	Yellow bib	Ref.
26	1	28 July 2018	(Germany) Hinterzarten	Rothaus-Schanze HS108 (night)	NH	(Japan) Sara Takanashi	(Japan) Yūki Itō	(Germany) Ramona Straub	(Japan) Sara Takanashi	
27	2	10 August 2018	(France) Courchevel	Tremplin du Praz HS135	LH	(Japan) Sara Takanashi	(Slovenia) Ema Klinec	(Japan) Yūki Itō	(Japan) Sara Takanashi	
28	3	17 August 2018	(Czech Republic) Frenštát pod Radhoštěm	Areal Horečky HS106	NH	(Japan) Sara Takanashi	(Norway) Maren Lundby	(Germany) Katharina Althaus	(Japan) Sara Takanashi	
29	4	18 August 2018	(Czech Republic) Frenštát pod Radhoštěm	Areal Horečky HS106	NH	(Japan) Sara Takanashi	(Japan) Yūki Itō	(Norway) Maren Lundby	(Japan) Sara Takanashi	
30	5	9 September 2018	(Russia) Chaykovsky	Snezhinka HS140	LH	(Slovenia) Ema Klinec	(Norway) Maren Lundby	(Japan) Sara Takanashi	(Japan) Sara Takanashi	
		3 October 2018	(Germany) Klingenthal	Vogtland Arena HS140	LH	strong wind				

=== Men's team ===
Num	Season	Date	Place	Hill	Size	Winner	Second	Third	Yellow bib	Ref.
23	1	21 July 2018	(Poland) Wisła	Malinka HS134 (night)	LH	Poland Maciej Kot; Dawid Kubacki; Kamil Stoch; Piotr Żyła	Germany Karl Geiger; Stephan Leyhe; Andreas Wellinger; Richard Freitag	Norway Halvor Egner Granerud; Marius Lindvik; Johann André Forfang; Robert Johansson	Poland	

=== Mixed team ===
Num	Season	Date	Place	Hill	Size	Winner	Second	Third	Yellow bib	Ref.
5	1	8 September 2018	(Russia) Chaykovsky	Snezhinka HS140 (night)	LH	Japan Nozomi Maruyama; Yukiya Satō; Sara Takanashi; Junshirō Kobayashi	Slovenia Jerneja Brecl; Jurij Tepeš; Ema Klinec; Robert Kranjec	Norway Anna Odine Strøm; Robin Pedersen; Maren Lundby; Fredrik Bjerkeengen	Japan	

== Men's standings ==
=== Overall ===
Rank	after 9 events	Points
1	(Russia) Evgeniy Klimov	555
2	(Germany) Karl Geiger	416
3	(Poland) Piotr Żyła	382
4	(Poland) Kamil Stoch	376
5	(Austria) Daniel Huber	305

=== Nations Cup ===
Rank	after 11 events	Points
1	Poland	1925
2	Japan	1348
3	Germany	1234
4	Austria	1063
5	Russia	883

=== Prize money ===
Rank	after 11 events	CHF
1	(Russia) Evgeniy Klimov	19,500
2	(Germany) Karl Geiger	16,500
3	(Poland) Kamil Stoch	16,000
4	(Poland) Piotr Żyła	13,500
5	(Japan) Ryōyū Kobayashi	10,500

== Ladies' standings ==
=== Overall ===
Rank	after 5 events	Points
1	(Japan) Sara Takanashi	460
2	(Slovenia) Ema Klinec	265
3	(Norway) Maren Lundby	260
4	(Japan) Yūki Itō	252
5	(Germany) Juliane Seyfarth	203

=== Nations Cup ===
Rank	after 6 events	Points
1	Japan	1133
2	Slovenia	814
3	Germany	744
4	Norway	551
5	Russia	483

=== Prize money ===
Rank	after 6 events	CHF
1	(Japan) Sara Takanashi	12,250
2	(Slovenia) Ema Klinec	5,250
3	(Norway) Maren Lundby	4,750
4	(Japan) Yūki Itō	4,000
5	(Germany) Katharina Althaus	2,250
