= 2018–19 FIS Ski Jumping Alpen Cup =

Alpen Cup 2018/19
Discipline	Men	Women
Overall	(Austria) David Haagen	(Austria) Lisa Hirner
Alpen Cup Tournament	—	(Austria) Lisa Hirner

Competition
Edition	29th	11th
Locations	5	7
Individual	10	13
Cancelled	2	3

The 2018/19 FIS Ski Jumping Alpen Cup was the 29th Alpen Cup season in ski jumping for men and the 11th for ladies.

Other competitive circuits this season included the World Cup, Grand Prix, Continental Cup, FIS Cup and FIS Race.

== Calendar ==
=== Men ===
Season	Date	Place	Hill	Size	Winner	Second	Third	Ref.
1	8 September 2018	(Switzerland) Einsiedeln	Andreas Küttel Schanze HS117	NH	(Austria) David Haagen	(Austria) Mika Schwann	(Slovenia) Jernej Presečnik	
2	9 September 2018	(Switzerland) Einsiedeln	Andreas Küttel Schanze HS117	NH	(Austria) David Haagen	(Germany) Philipp Raimund	(Slovenia) Lovro Vodušek	
3	5 October 2018	(Italy) Predazzo	Trampolino dal Ben HS106	NH	(Austria) David Haagen	(Slovenia) Jan Bombek	(Switzerland) Dominik Peter	
4	6 October 2018	(Italy) Predazzo	Trampolino dal Ben HS106	NH	(Slovenia) Jan Bombek	(Germany) Philipp Raimund	(Austria) David Haagen	
5	21 December 2018	(Austria) Villach	Villacher Alpenarena HS98	NH	(Austria) Stefan Rainer	(Austria) Julian Wienerroither	(Germany) Luca Roth	
6	22 December 2018	(Austria) Villach	Villacher Alpenarena HS98	NH	(Germany) Luca Roth	(Austria) David Haagen (Austria) Stefan Rainer		
	12 January 2019	(Germany) Oberwiesenthal	Fichtelbergschanzen HS106	NH	canceled			
	13 January 2019	(Germany) Oberwiesenthal	Fichtelbergschanzen HS106	NH	canceled			
7	15 February 2019	(Slovenia) Kranj	Bauhenk HS109 (night)	NH	(Slovenia) Aljaž Osterc	(Slovenia) Lovro Kos	(Austria) David Haagen	
8	16 February 2019	(Slovenia) Kranj	Bauhenk HS109	NH	(Slovenia) Aljaž Osterc	(Switzerland) Dominik Peter	(Slovenia) Jernej Presečnik	
9	9 March 2019	(France) Chaux-Neuve	La Côté Feuillée HS118	LH	(Switzerland) Dominik Peter	(Germany) Luca Roth	(Germany) Philipp Raimund	
10	10 March 2019	(France) Chaux-Neuve	La Côté Feuillée HS118	LH	(Austria) David Haagen	(Germany) Luca Roth	(Slovenia) Rok Masle	

=== Ladies ===
Season	Date	Place	Hill	Size	Winner	Second	Third	Ref.
1	5 August 2018	(Germany) Klingenthal	Mühlleithen Vogtlandschanzen HS85	MH	(Germany) Alexandra Seifert	(Germany) Jenny Nowak	(Austria) Lisa Hirner	
2	6 August 2018	(Germany) Klingenthal	Mühlleithen Vogtlandschanzen HS85	MH	(Germany) Josephin Laue	(Germany) Michelle Göbel	(Germany) Alina Ihle	
3	8 August 2018	(Germany) Pöhla	Pöhlbachschanze HS66	MH	(Austria) Lisa Hirner	(Germany) Alina Ihle	(Austria) Vanessa Moharitsch	
4	9 August 2018	(Germany) Pöhla	Pöhlbachschanze HS66	MH	(Germany) Alina Ihle (Slovenia) Jerneja Repinc Zupančič		(France) Joséphine Pagnier	
5	10 August 2018	(Germany) Bischofsgrün	Ochsenkopfschanze HS71	MH	(Slovenia) Jerneja Repinc Zupančič	(Austria) Vanessa Moharitsch	(France) Océane Paillard	
6	11 August 2018	(Germany) Bischofsgrün	Ochsenkopfschanze HS71	MH	(France) Océane Paillard	(Slovenia) Jerneja Repinc Zupančič	(Austria) Lisa Hirner	
3rd Alpen Cup Tournament Overall (5–11 August 2018)					(Austria) Lisa Hirner	(Germany) Josephin Laue	(Germany) Alina Ihle	
7	6 October 2018	(Italy) Predazzo	Trampolino dal Ben HS106	NH	(Italy) Lara Malsiner	(Germany) Agnes Reisch	(Austria) Marita Kramer	
8	7 October 2018	(Italy) Predazzo	Trampolino dal Ben HS106	NH	(Germany) Agnes Reisch	(Austria) Marita Kramer	(Italy) Lara Malsiner	
9	22 December 2018	(Austria) Villach	Villacher Alpenarena HS98	NH	(Austria) Lisa Eder	(Austria) Lisa Hirner	(France) Lucile Morat	
10	23 December 2018	(Austria) Villach	Villacher Alpenarena HS98	NH	(Austria) Lisa Hirner	(France) Lucile Morat	(Austria) Marita Kramer	
11	11 January 2019	(Germany) Schonach	Langenwaldschanze HS98	NH	(France) Joséphine Pagnier	(Slovenia) Pia Mazi	(Germany) Agnes Reisch	
12	12 January 2019	(Germany) Schonach	Langenwaldschanze HS98	NH	(France) Joséphine Pagnier	(Germany) Selina Freitag	(Slovenia) Silva Verbič	
	16 February 2019	(Slovenia) Kranj	Bauhenk HS109	NH	canceled			
	17 February 2019	(Slovenia) Kranj	Bauhenk HS109	NH	canceled			
13	9 March 2019	(France) Chaux-Neuve	La Côté Feuillée HS60	MH	(Slovenia) Pia Mazi	(Slovenia) Jerneja Repinc Zupančič	(Slovenia) Jerica Jesenko	
	10 March 2019	(France) Chaux-Neuve	La Côté Feuillée HS60	MH	canceled			

== Standings ==
=== Men ===
Rank	after 10 events	Points
1	(Austria) David Haagen	786
2	(Switzerland) Dominik Peter	574
3	(Germany) Luca Roth	445
4	(Slovenia) Aljaž Osterc	401
5	(Slovenia) Jernej Presečnik	383

=== Ladies ===
Rank	after 13 events	Points
1	(Austria) Lisa Hirner	661
2	(Slovenia) Jerneja Repinc Zupančič	537
3	(Germany) Josephin Laue	447
4	(France) Joséphine Pagnier	446
5	(Germany) Alina Ihle	422

=== Ladies' Alpen Cup Tournament ===
Rank	after 6 events	Points
1	(Austria) Lisa Hirner	1221.0
2	(Germany) Josephin Laue	1162.4
3	(Germany) Alina Ihle	1156.8
4	(France) Océane Paillard	1155.4
5	(Austria) Vanessa Moharitsch	1146.1
