= 2018–19 FIS Ski Jumping World Cup =

Discipline	Men	Women
Overall	(Japan) Ryōyū Kobayashi	(Norway) Maren Lundby
Nations Cup	Poland	Germany
Ski flying	(Japan) Ryōyū Kobayashi	—

Stage events
Four Hills Tournament	(Japan) Ryōyū Kobayashi	—
Planica7	(Japan) Ryōyū Kobayashi	—
Willingen Five	(Japan) Ryōyū Kobayashi	—
Raw Air	(Japan) Ryōyū Kobayashi	(Norway) Maren Lundby
Lillehammer Triple	—	(Germany) Katharina Althaus
Russia Tour Blue Bird	—	(Germany) Juliane Seyfarth

Competition
Edition	40th	8th
Locations	19	13
Individual	28	24
Team	7	2
Cancelled	0	1
Rescheduled	1 Ind. + 1 Team	.

The 2018–19 FIS Ski Jumping World Cup was the 40th World Cup season in ski jumping for men, the 22nd official World Cup season in ski flying, and the 8th World Cup season for women.

Season began on 17 November 2018 in Wisła, Poland for men and in Lillehammer, Norway for women; the season concluded on 24 March 2019 in Planica for men and in Chaykovsky for women.

The first edition of women's Raw Air was organized simultaneously with men's edition between 9–14 March 2019. And at the end of the season new tournament, the first edition of "Russia Tour Blue Bird" for women was organized in Nizhny Tagil and Chaykovsky.

New rules have been introduced at the 2018 Fall meeting in Zürich: from now on one Continental Cup point will be enough to perform at the Ski Flying event and not one World Cup point anymore. And also all qualification rounds were awarded with 3,000 CHF and Ski Flying qualifications with 5,000 CHF from this season on.

Ryōyū Kobayashi with outstanding season (12 wins, won everything that was available; overall and ski flying title, Four Hills Tournament (all 4 wins), Raw Air, Planica7 and Willingen Five. Nations Cup was taken by Team of Poland. There were 28 individual events (1 rescheduled) on 19 different venues in 10 countries, 7 men's team events (also 1 rescheduled) and 2 women's team events.

== Map of world cup hosts ==
Europe
Germany	Austria	Asia

== Calendar ==
=== Men ===
L – large hill / F – flying hill
All	No.	Date	Place (Hill)	Size	Winner	Second	Third	Overall leader	R.
948	1	18 November 2018	(Poland) Wisła (Malinka HS134)	L _{675}	(Russia) Evgeniy Klimov	(Germany) Stephan Leyhe	(Japan) Ryōyū Kobayashi	(Russia) Evgeniy Klimov	
949	2	(Note: Individual men's event in Ruka (24 November) was delayed and postponed for two times because of strong wind. Only one round as official result.)24 November 2018	(Finland) Ruka (Rukatunturi HS142)	L _{676}	(Japan) Ryōyū Kobayashi	(Poland) Kamil Stoch	(Poland) Piotr Żyła	(Japan) Ryōyū Kobayashi	
950	3	25 November 2018	(Finland) Ruka (Rukatunturi HS142)	L _{677}	(Japan) Ryōyū Kobayashi	(Germany) Andreas Wellinger	(Poland) Kamil Stoch	(Japan) Ryōyū Kobayashi	
951	4	1 December 2018	(Russia) Nizhny Tagil (Tramplin Stork HS134)	L _{678}	(Norway) Johann André Forfang	(Poland) Piotr Żyła	(Japan) Ryōyū Kobayashi	(Japan) Ryōyū Kobayashi	
952	5	2 December 2018	(Russia) Nizhny Tagil (Tramplin Stork HS134)	L _{679}	(Japan) Ryōyū Kobayashi	(Norway) Johann André Forfang	(Poland) Piotr Żyła	(Japan) Ryōyū Kobayashi	
		9 December 2018	(Germany) Titisee-Neustadt (Hochfirstschanze HS142)	L _{cnx}	cancelled due to warm weather and lack of snow (rescheduled in Oberstdorf as ski flying event on 1 February)			—	
953	6	15 December 2018	(Switzerland) Engelberg (Gross-Titlis HS140)	L _{680}	(Germany) Karl Geiger	(Poland) Piotr Żyła	(Austria) Daniel Huber	(Japan) Ryōyū Kobayashi	
954	7	16 December 2018	(Switzerland) Engelberg (Gross-Titlis HS140)	L _{681}	(Japan) Ryōyū Kobayashi	(Poland) Piotr Żyła	(Poland) Kamil Stoch	(Japan) Ryōyū Kobayashi	
955	8	30 December 2018	(Germany) Oberstdorf (Schattenberg HS137)	L _{682}	(Japan) Ryōyū Kobayashi	(Germany) Markus Eisenbichler	(Austria) Stefan Kraft	(Japan) Ryōyū Kobayashi	
956	9	1 January 2019	(Germany) Garmisch-Pa (Gr. Olympiaschanze HS142)	L _{683}	(Japan) Ryōyū Kobayashi	(Germany) Markus Eisenbichler	(Poland) Dawid Kubacki	(Japan) Ryōyū Kobayashi	
957	10	4 January 2019	(Austria) Innsbruck (Bergiselschanze HS130)	L _{684}	(Japan) Ryōyū Kobayashi	(Austria) Stefan Kraft	(Norway) Andreas Stjernen	(Japan) Ryōyū Kobayashi	
958	11	6 January 2019	(Austria) Bischofshofen (Paul-Ausserleitner HS142)	L _{685}	(Japan) Ryōyū Kobayashi	(Poland) Dawid Kubacki	(Austria) Stefan Kraft	(Japan) Ryōyū Kobayashi	
67th Four Hills Tournament Overall (30 December 2018 – 6 January 2019)					(Japan) Ryōyū Kobayashi	(Germany) Markus Eisenbichler	(Germany) Stephan Leyhe	4H Tournament	
959	12	12 January 2019	(Italy) Val di Fiemme (Trampolino dal Ben HS135)	L _{686}	(Japan) Ryōyū Kobayashi	(Poland) Dawid Kubacki	(Poland) Kamil Stoch	(Japan) Ryōyū Kobayashi	
960	13	13 January 2019	(Italy) Val di Fiemme (Trampolino dal Ben HS135)	L _{687}	(Poland) Dawid Kubacki	(Austria) Stefan Kraft	(Poland) Kamil Stoch	(Japan) Ryōyū Kobayashi	
961	14	20 January 2019	(Poland) Zakopane (Wielka Krokiew HS140)	L _{688}	(Austria) Stefan Kraft	(Norway) Robert Johansson	(Japan) Yukiya Satō	(Japan) Ryōyū Kobayashi	
962	15	26 January 2019	(Japan) Sapporo (Ōkurayama HS137)	L _{689}	(Austria) Stefan Kraft	(Poland) Kamil Stoch	(Norway) Robert Johansson	(Japan) Ryōyū Kobayashi	
963	16	27 January 2019	(Japan) Sapporo (Ōkurayama HS137)	L _{690}	(Austria) Stefan Kraft	(Slovenia) Timi Zajc	(Japan) Ryōyū Kobayashi	(Japan) Ryōyū Kobayashi	
964	17	(Note: Individual cancelled men's LH event from Titisee-Neustadt (9 December) was rescheduled to Oberstdorf (1 February) as individual ski flying event.)1 February 2019	(Germany) Oberstdorf (Heini-Klopfer HS235)	F _{120}	(Slovenia) Timi Zajc	(Poland) Dawid Kubacki	(Germany) Markus Eisenbichler	(Japan) Ryōyū Kobayashi	
965	18	2 February 2019	(Germany) Oberstdorf (Heini-Klopfer HS235)	F _{121}	(Japan) Ryōyū Kobayashi	(Germany) Markus Eisenbichler	(Austria) Stefan Kraft	(Japan) Ryōyū Kobayashi	
966	19	3 February 2019	(Germany) Oberstdorf (Heini-Klopfer HS235)	F _{122}	(Poland) Kamil Stoch	(Russia) Evgeniy Klimov	(Poland) Dawid Kubacki	(Japan) Ryōyū Kobayashi	
967	20	10 February 2019	(Finland) Lahti (Salpausselkä HS130)	L _{691}	(Poland) Kamil Stoch	(Japan) Ryōyū Kobayashi	(Norway) Robert Johansson	(Japan) Ryōyū Kobayashi	
qualifying		15 February 2019	(Germany) Willingen (Mühlenkopf HS145)	L _{Qro}	(Germany) Markus Eisenbichler	(Poland) Piotr Żyła	(Austria) Stefan Kraft	—	
968	21	16 February 2019	(Germany) Willingen (Mühlenkopf HS145)	L _{692}	(Germany) Karl Geiger	(Poland) Kamil Stoch	(Japan) Ryōyū Kobayashi	(Japan) Ryōyū Kobayashi	
969	22	17 February 2019	(Germany) Willingen (Mühlenkopf HS145)	L _{693}	(Japan) Ryōyū Kobayashi	(Germany) Markus Eisenbichler	(Poland) Piotr Żyła	(Japan) Ryōyū Kobayashi	
2nd Willingen Five Overall (15 – 17 February 2019)					(Japan) Ryōyū Kobayashi	(Poland) Piotr Żyła	(Germany) Karl Geiger	Willingen Five	
FIS Nordic World Ski Championships 2019 (23 February – 1 March • (Austria) Seefeld in Tirol)
prologue		8 March 2019	(Norway) Oslo (Holmenkollbakken HS134)	L _{Qro}	(Norway) Robert Johansson	(Poland) Kamil Stoch	(Slovenia) Timi Zajc	—	
team		9 March 2019	(Norway) Oslo (Holmenkollbakken HS134)	L _{T}	(Norway) Robert Johansson	(Japan) Ryōyū Kobayashi	(Germany) Markus Eisenbichler	—	
970	23	10 March 2019	(Norway) Oslo (Holmenkollbakken HS134)	L _{694}	(Norway) Robert Johansson	(Austria) Stefan Kraft	(Slovenia) Peter Prevc	(Japan) Ryōyū Kobayashi	
prologue		11 March 2019	(Norway) Lillehammer (Lysgårdsbakken HS140)	L _{Qro}	(Japan) Junshirō Kobayashi	(Japan) Ryōyū Kobayashi	(Norway) Johann André Forfang	—	
971	24	12 March 2019	(Norway) Lillehammer (Lysgårdsbakken HS140)	L _{695}	(Austria) Stefan Kraft	(Norway) Robert Johansson	(Japan) Ryōyū Kobayashi	(Japan) Ryōyū Kobayashi	
prologue		13 March 2019	(Norway) Trondheim (Granåsen HS138)	L _{Qro}	(Austria) Stefan Kraft	(Japan) Ryōyū Kobayashi	(Poland) Dawid Kubacki	—	
972	25	14 March 2019	(Norway) Trondheim (Granåsen HS138)	L _{696}	(Japan) Ryōyū Kobayashi	(Norway) Andreas Stjernen	(Austria) Stefan Kraft	(Japan) Ryōyū Kobayashi	
prologue		15 March 2019	(Norway) Vikersund (Vikersundbakken HS240)	F _{Qro}	(Japan) Ryōyū Kobayashi	(Austria) Stefan Kraft	(Germany) Markus Eisenbichler	—	
team		16 March 2019	(Norway) Vikersund (Vikersundbakken HS240)	F _{T}	(Slovenia) Domen Prevc	(Austria) Stefan Kraft	(Japan) Ryōyū Kobayashi	—	
973	26	17 March 2019	(Norway) Vikersund (Vikersundbakken HS240)	F _{123}	(Slovenia) Domen Prevc	(Japan) Ryōyū Kobayashi	(Austria) Stefan Kraft	(Japan) Ryōyū Kobayashi	
3rd Raw Air Men's Overall (8 – 17 March 2019)					(Japan) Ryōyū Kobayashi	(Austria) Stefan Kraft	(Norway) Robert Johansson	Raw Air	
qualifying		21 March 2019	(Slovenia) Planica (Letalnica b. Gorišek HS240)	F _{Qro}	(Japan) Ryōyū Kobayashi	(Germany) Markus Eisenbichler	(Slovenia) Timi Zajc	—	
974	27	22 March 2019	(Slovenia) Planica (Letalnica b. Gorišek HS240)	F _{124}	(Germany) Markus Eisenbichler	(Japan) Ryōyū Kobayashi	(Poland) Piotr Żyła	(Japan) Ryōyū Kobayashi	
team		23 March 2019	(Slovenia) Planica (Letalnica b. Gorišek HS240)	F _{T}	(Japan) Ryōyū Kobayashi	(Germany) Markus Eisenbichler	(Slovenia) Timi Zajc	—	
975	28	24 March 2019	(Slovenia) Planica (Letalnica b. Gorišek HS240)	F _{125}	(Japan) Ryōyū Kobayashi	(Slovenia) Domen Prevc	(Germany) Markus Eisenbichler	(Japan) Ryōyū Kobayashi	
2nd Planica7 Overall (21 – 24 March 2019)					(Japan) Ryōyū Kobayashi	(Germany) Markus Eisenbichler	(Slovenia) Timi Zajc	Planica7	
40th FIS World Cup Men's Overall (18 November 2018 – 24 March 2019)					(Japan) Ryōyū Kobayashi	(Austria) Stefan Kraft	(Poland) Kamil Stoch	World Cup Overall	

=== Standings ===
==== Overall ====
Rank	after all 28 events	Points
1	(Japan) Ryōyū Kobayashi	2085
2	(Austria) Stefan Kraft	1349
3	(Poland) Kamil Stoch	1288
4	(Poland) Piotr Żyła	1131
5	(Poland) Dawid Kubacki	988
6	(Norway) Robert Johansson	974
7	(Germany) Markus Eisenbichler	937
8	(Norway) Johann André Forfang	892
9	(Slovenia) Timi Zajc	833
10	(Germany) Karl Geiger	765

==== Nations Cup ====
Rank	after all 35 events	Points
1	Poland	6083
2	Germany	5650
3	Japan	4813
4	Austria	4530
5	Norway	3943
6	Slovenia	3736
7	Switzerland	1467
8	Czech Republic	1056
9	Russia	867
10	Finland	396

=== Prize money ===
Rank	after all 35 payouts	CHF
1	(Japan) Ryōyū Kobayashi	251,733
2	(Austria) Stefan Kraft	181,000
3	(Poland) Kamil Stoch	155,800
4	(Poland) Piotr Żyła	142,850
5	(Germany) Markus Eisenbichler	136,800
6	(Poland) Dawid Kubacki	131,400
7	(Germany) Karl Geiger	111,450
8	(Norway) Robert Johansson	107,850
9	(Norway) Johann André Forfang	104,650
10	(Slovenia) Timi Zajc	99,383

==== Ski Flying ====
Rank	after all 6 events	Points
1	(Japan) Ryōyū Kobayashi	407
2	(Germany) Markus Eisenbichler	371
3	(Poland) Piotr Żyła	289
4	(Slovenia) Domen Prevc	271
5	(Poland) Dawid Kubacki	251
6	(Slovenia) Timi Zajc	250
7	(Poland) Kamil Stoch	244
8	(Austria) Stefan Kraft	228
9	(Norway) Johann André Forfang	200
10	(Russia) Evgeniy Klimov	158

==== Four Hills Tournament ====
Rank	after all 4 events	Points
1	(Japan) Ryōyū Kobayashi	1098.0
2	(Germany) Markus Eisenbichler	1035.9
3	(Germany) Stephan Leyhe	1014.1
4	(Poland) Dawid Kubacki	1010.8
5	(Czech Republic) Roman Koudelka	1006.3
6	(Poland) Kamil Stoch	994.0
7	(Norway) Andreas Stjernen	988.0
8	(Norway) Robert Johansson	983.2
9	(Austria) Daniel Huber	970.4
10	(Switzerland) Killian Peier	959.3

==== Raw Air ====
Rank	after all 10 events	Points
1	(Japan) Ryōyū Kobayashi	2461.5
2	(Austria) Stefan Kraft	2458.6
3	(Norway) Robert Johansson	2351.6
4	(Germany) Markus Eisenbichler	2296.8
5	(Norway) Johann André Forfang	2265.3
6	(Switzerland) Simon Ammann	2196.5
7	(Poland) Dawid Kubacki	2196.0
8	(Poland) Jakub Wolny	2187.1
9	(Poland) Kamil Stoch	2147.6
10	(Russia) Evgeniy Klimov	2144.1

==== Willingen Five ====
Rank	after all 3 events	Points
1	(Japan) Ryōyū Kobayashi	737.5
2	(Poland) Piotr Żyła	708.6
3	(Germany) Karl Geiger	708.0
4	(Poland) Kamil Stoch	697.4
5	(Poland) Dawid Kubacki	685.7
6	(Slovenia) Timi Zajc	683.3
7	(Austria) Stefan Kraft	671.8
8	(Russia) Evgeniy Klimov	670.1
9	(Germany) Richard Freitag	669.8
10	(Switzerland) Killian Peier	664.5

==== Planica7 ====
Rank	after all 4 events	Points
1	(Japan) Ryōyū Kobayashi	1601.3
2	(Germany) Markus Eisenbichler	1572.1
3	(Slovenia) Timi Zajc	1513.5
4	(Poland) Piotr Żyła	1507.4
5	(Slovenia) Domen Prevc	1499.8
6	(Germany) Karl Geiger	1446.9
7	(Poland) Dawid Kubacki	1446.2
8	(Switzerland) Simon Ammann	1431.7
9	(Norway) Johann Andre Forfang	1428.6
10	(Poland) Jakub Wolny	1420.4

== Women's Individual ==
=== Calendar ===
N – normal hill; L – large hill
All	No.	Date	Place (Hill)	Size	Winner	Second	Third	Yellow bib	R.
112	1	30 November 2018	(Norway) Lillehammer (Lysgårdsbakken HS98 / 140)	N _{102}	(Germany) Juliane Seyfarth	(Norway) Maren Lundby	(Japan) Sara Takanashi	(Germany) Juliane Seyfarth	
113	2	1 December 2018	(Norway) Lillehammer (Lysgårdsbakken HS98 / 140)	N _{103}	(Russia) Lidiia Iakovleva	(Norway) Maren Lundby	(Slovenia) Ema Klinec	(Norway) Maren Lundby	
114	3	2 December 2018	(Norway) Lillehammer (Lysgårdsbakken HS98 / 140)	L _{011}	(Germany) Katharina Althaus	(Germany) Ramona Straub	(Austria) Daniela Iraschko-Stolz	(Germany) Katharina Althaus	
2nd Lillehammer Triple Overall (30 November – 2 December 2018)					(Germany) Katharina Althaus	(Germany) Juliane Seyfarth	(Germany) Ramona Straub	Lillehammer Triple	
		9 December 2018	(Germany) Titisee-Neustadt (Hochfirstschanze HS142)	L _{cnx}	cancelled due to warm weather, rain and lack of snow			—	
115	4	15 December 2018	(France) Prémanon (Les Tuffes HS90)	N _{104}	(Germany) Katharina Althaus	(Japan) Sara Takanashi	(Slovenia) Ema Klinec	(Germany) Katharina Althaus	
116	5	16 December 2018	(France) Prémanon (Les Tuffes HS90)	N _{105}	(Germany) Katharina Althaus	(Norway) Maren Lundby	(Japan) Sara Takanashi	(Germany) Katharina Althaus	
117	6	12 January 2019	(Japan) Sapporo (Ōkurayama HS137)	L _{012}	(Austria) Daniela Iraschko-Stolz	(Germany) Juliane Seyfarth	(Norway) Maren Lundby	(Germany) Katharina Althaus	
118	7	13 January 2019	(Japan) Sapporo (Ōkurayama HS137)	L _{013}	(Norway) Maren Lundby	(Germany) Katharina Althaus	(Germany) Juliane Seyfarth	(Germany) Katharina Althaus	
119	8	18 January 2019	(Japan) Zaō (Yamagata HS102)	N _{106}	(Austria) Daniela Iraschko-Stolz	(Japan) Sara Takanashi	(Germany) Katharina Althaus	(Germany) Katharina Althaus	
120	9	20 January 2019	(Japan) Zaō (Yamagata HS102)	N _{107}	(Norway) Maren Lundby	(Norway) Anna Odine Strøm	(Germany) Carina Vogt	(Germany) Katharina Althaus	
121	10	26 January 2019	(Romania) Râșnov (Trambulina Valea HS97)	N _{108}	(Norway) Maren Lundby	(Germany) Katharina Althaus	(Japan) Sara Takanashi	(Germany) Katharina Althaus	
122	11	27 January 2019	(Romania) Râșnov (Trambulina Valea HS97)	N _{109}	(Norway) Maren Lundby	(Germany) Carina Vogt	(Germany) Juliane Seyfarth	(Norway) Maren Lundby	
123	12	2 February 2019	(Austria) Hinzenbach (Aigner-Schanze HS90)	N _{110}	(Norway) Maren Lundby	(Germany) Juliane Seyfarth	(Germany) Katharina Althaus	(Norway) Maren Lundby	
124	13	3 February 2019	(Austria) Hinzenbach (Aigner-Schanze HS90)	N _{111}	(Norway) Maren Lundby	(Japan) Sara Takanashi	(Germany) Katharina Althaus	(Norway) Maren Lundby	
125	14	8 February 2019	(Slovenia) Ljubno (Savina HS94)	N _{112}	(Norway) Maren Lundby	(Japan) Sara Takanashi	(Slovenia) Urša Bogataj	(Norway) Maren Lundby	
126	15	10 February 2019	(Slovenia) Ljubno (Savina HS94)	N _{113}	(Japan) Sara Takanashi	(Norway) Maren Lundby	(Germany) Juliane Seyfarth	(Norway) Maren Lundby	
127	16	16 February 2019	(Germany) Oberstdorf (Schattenberg HS137)	L _{014}	(Norway) Maren Lundby	(Germany) Katharina Althaus	(Slovenia) Urša Bogataj	(Norway) Maren Lundby	
128	17	17 February 2019	(Germany) Oberstdorf (Schattenberg HS137)	L _{015}	(Norway) Maren Lundby	(Germany) Juliane Seyfarth	(Japan) Sara Takanashi	(Norway) Maren Lundby	
FIS Nordic World Ski Championships 2019 (27 February • (Austria) Seefeld in Tirol)
prologue		9 March 2019	(Norway) Oslo (Holmenkollbakken HS134)	L _{Qro}	(Norway) Maren Lundby	(Germany) Katharina Althaus	(Germany) Juliane Seyfarth	—	
129	18	10 March 2019	(Norway) Oslo (Holmenkollbakken HS134)	L _{016}	(Austria) Daniela Iraschko-Stolz	(Germany) Juliane Seyfarth	(Germany) Katharina Althaus	(Norway) Maren Lundby	
prologue		11 March 2019	(Norway) Lillehammer (Lysgårdsbakken HS140)	L _{Qro}	(Norway) Maren Lundby	(Germany) Katharina Althaus (Slovenia) Nika Križnar		—	
130	19	12 March 2019	(Norway) Lillehammer (Lysgårdsbakken HS140)	L _{017}	(Norway) Maren Lundby	(Germany) Katharina Althaus	(Austria) Eva Pinkelnig	(Norway) Maren Lundby	
prologue		13 March 2019	(Norway) Trondheim (Granåsen HS138)	L _{Qro}	(Norway) Maren Lundby	(Austria) Eva Pinkelnig	(Japan) Yūki Itō	—	
131	20	14 March 2019	(Norway) Trondheim (Granåsen HS138)	L _{018}	(Norway) Maren Lundby	(Germany) Juliane Seyfarth	(Austria) Eva Pinkelnig	(Norway) Maren Lundby	
1st Raw Air Women's Overall (9 – 14 March 2019)					(Norway) Maren Lundby	(Germany) Katharina Althaus	(Germany) Juliane Seyfarth	Raw Air	
132	21	16 March 2019	(Russia) Nizhny Tagil (Tramplin Stork HS97)	N _{114}	(Germany) Juliane Seyfarth	(Norway) Maren Lundby	(Norway) Anna Odine Strøm	(Norway) Maren Lundby	
133	22	17 March 2019	(Russia) Nizhny Tagil (Tramplin Stork HS97)	N _{115}	(Germany) Juliane Seyfarth	(Norway) Maren Lundby	(Germany) Katharina Althaus	(Norway) Maren Lundby	
134	23	23 March 2019	(Russia) Chaykovsky (Snezhinka HS102 / 140)	N _{116}	(Germany) Juliane Seyfarth	(Germany) Katharina Althaus	(Japan) Sara Takanashi	(Norway) Maren Lundby	
135	24	24 March 2019	(Russia) Chaykovsky (Snezhinka HS102 / 140)	L _{019}	(Norway) Maren Lundby	(Germany) Juliane Seyfarth	(Slovenia) Nika Križnar	(Norway) Maren Lundby	
1st Russia Tour Blue Bird Overall (16 – 24 March 2019)					(Germany) Juliane Seyfarth	(Norway) Maren Lundby	(Germany) Katharina Althaus	Blue Bird	
8th FIS World Cup Women's Overall (30 November 2018 – 24 March 2019)					(Norway) Maren Lundby	(Germany) Katharina Althaus	(Germany) Juliane Seyfarth	World Cup Overall	

=== Standings ===
==== Overall ====
Rank	after all 24 events	Points
1	(Norway) Maren Lundby	1909
2	(Germany) Katharina Althaus	1493
3	(Germany) Juliane Seyfarth	1451
4	(Japan) Sara Takanashi	1190
5	(Slovenia) Nika Križnar	826
6	(Austria) Eva Pinkelnig	825
7	(Norway) Anna Odine Strøm	717
8	(Austria) Daniela Iraschko-Stolz	701
9	(Germany) Carina Vogt	686
10	(Austria) Chiara Hölzl	644

==== Nations Cup ====
Rank	after all 26 events	Points
1	Germany	5220
2	Norway	3443
3	Austria	3192
4	Japan	2969
5	Slovenia	2751
6	Russia	1753
7	Italy	624
8	France	423
9	United States	133
10	China	107

==== Prize money ====
Rank	after all 26 payouts	CHF
1	(Norway) Maren Lundby	57,000
2	(Germany) Katharina Althaus	47,790
3	(Germany) Juliane Seyfarth	46,530
4	(Japan) Sara Takanashi	35,950
5	(Austria) Eva Pinkelnig	25,720
6	(Slovenia) Nika Križnar	25,530
7	(Germany) Carina Vogt	22,770
8	(Austria) Daniela Iraschko-Stolz	21,780
9	(Norway) Anna Odine Strøm	21,255
10	(Austria) Chiara Hölzl	19,735

==== Raw Air ====
Rank	after all 6 events	Points
1	(Norway) Maren Lundby	1144.6
2	(Germany) Katharina Althaus	1088.1
3	(Germany) Juliane Seyfarth	1066.3
4	(Austria) Daniela Iraschko-Stolz	1055.9
5	(Austria) Eva Pinkelnig	1033.8
6	(Japan) Yūki Itō	972.2
7	(Japan) Sara Takanashi	971.1
8	(Austria) Chiara Hölzl	954.1
9	(Slovenia) Nika Križnar	948.7
10	(Norway) Anna Odine Strøm	938.9

==== Lillehammer Triple ====
Rank	after 3 events	Points
1	(Germany) Katharina Althaus	750.4
2	(Germany) Juliane Seyfarth	729.6
3	(Germany) Ramona Straub	715.1
4	(Russia) Lidiia Iakovleva	713.9
5	(Austria) Daniela Iraschko-Stolz	708.8
6	(Norway) Maren Lundby	699.8
7	(Austria) Eva Pinkelnig	698.3
8	(Germany) Carina Vogt	687.9
9	(Slovenia) Ema Klinec	685.4
10	(Slovenia) Nika Križnar	674.1

==== Russia Tour Blue Bird ====
Rank	after all 4 events	Points
1	(Germany) Juliane Seyfarth	959.9
2	(Norway) Maren Lundby	939.0
3	(Germany) Katharina Althaus	896.9
4	(Austria) Chiara Hölzl	861.3
5	(Slovenia) Nika Križnar	861.0
6	(Japan) Sara Takanashi	857.8
7	(Austria) J. Seifriedsberger	848.5
8	(Slovenia) Urša Bogataj	841.4
9	(Austria) Eva Pinkelnig	841.2
10	(Japan) Yūki Itō	823.1

== Team events ==
=== Calendar ===
All	No.	Date	Place (Hill)	Size	Winner	Second	Third	R.
Men's team
96	1	17 November 2018	(Poland) Wisła (Malinka HS134)	L _{073}	Poland Piotr Żyła; Jakub Wolny; Dawid Kubacki; Kamil Stoch	Germany Karl Geiger; Markus Eisenbichler; Stephan Leyhe; Richard Freitag	Austria Michael Hayböck; Clemens Aigner; Daniel Huber; Stefan Kraft	
		8 December 2018	(Germany) Titisee-Neustadt (Hochfirstschanze HS142)	L _{cnx}	cancelled due to warm weather and lack of snow (rescheduled in Willingen on 15 February)			
97	2	19 January 2019	(Poland) Zakopane (Wielka Krokiew HS140)	L _{074}	Germany Karl Geiger; Markus Eisenbichler; David Siegel; Stephan Leyhe	Austria Daniel Huber; Jan Hörl; Michael Hayböck; Stefan Kraft	Poland Piotr Żyła; Maciej Kot; Kamil Stoch; Dawid Kubacki	
98	3	9 February 2019	(Finland) Lahti (Salpausselkä HS130)	L _{075}	Austria Philipp Aschenwald; Gregor Schlierenzauer; Michael Hayböck; Stefan Kraft	Germany Karl Geiger; Richard Freitag; Andreas Wellinger; Stephan Leyhe	Japan Yukiya Satō; Daiki Itō; Junshirō Kobayashi; Ryōyū Kobayashi	
99	4	(Note: Cancelled Men's team event from Titisee-Neustadt (8 December) was rescheduled to Willingen (15 February).)15 February 2019	(Germany) Willingen (Mühlenkopfschanze HS145)	L _{076}	Poland Piotr Żyła; Jakub Wolny; Dawid Kubacki; Kamil Stoch	Germany Karl Geiger; Richard Freitag; Markus Eisenbichler; Stephan Leyhe	Slovenia Anže Semenič; Peter Prevc; Jernej Damjan; Timi Zajc	
100	5	(Note: Men's Individual event in Oslo (9 March) had one round only due to strong wind.)9 March 2019	(Norway) Oslo (Holmenkollbakken HS134)	L _{077}	Norway Johann André Forfang; Robin Pedersen; Marius Lindvik; Robert Johansson	Japan Yukiya Satō; Noriaki Kasai; Junshirō Kobayashi; Ryōyū Kobayashi	Austria Michael Hayböck; Manuel Fettner; Philipp Aschenwald; Stefan Kraft	
101	6	16 March 2019	(Norway) Vikersund (Vikersundbakken HS240)	F _{022}	Slovenia Anže Semenič; Peter Prevc; Domen Prevc; Timi Zajc	Germany Constantin Schmid; Richard Freitag; Karl Geiger; Markus Eisenbichler	Austria Michael Hayböck; Philipp Aschenwald; Daniel Huber; Stefan Kraft	
102	7	23 March 2019	(Slovenia) Planica (Letalnica b. Gorišek HS240)	F _{023}	Poland Jakub Wolny; Kamil Stoch; Dawid Kubacki; Piotr Żyła	Germany Karl Geiger; Constantin Schmid; Richard Freitag; Markus Eisenbichler	Slovenia Anže Semenič; Peter Prevc; Domen Prevc; Timi Zajc	
Women's team
3	1	19 January 2019	(Japan) Zaō (Yamagata HS102)	N _{003}	Germany Juliane Seyfarth; Ramona Straub; Carina Vogt; Katharina Althaus	Austria J. Seifriedsberger; Eva Pinkelnig; Chiara Hölzl; Daniela Iraschko-Stolz	Japan Yūki Itō; Yūka Setō; Kaori Iwabuchi; Sara Takanashi	
4	2	9 February 2019	(Slovenia) Ljubno (Savina HS94)	N _{004}	Germany Carina Vogt; Anna Rupprecht; Juliane Seyfarth; Katharina Althaus	Slovenia Jerneja Brecl; Špela Rogelj; Nika Križnar; Urša Bogataj	Austria J. Seifriedsberger; Lisa Eder; Chiara Hölzl; Eva Pinkelnig	

== Qualifications ==
=== Men ===
No.	Place	Qualifications	Competition	Size	Winner
1	(Poland) Wisła	17 November 2018	19 November 2018	L	(Russia) Evgeniy Klimov
	(Finland) Ruka	23 November 2018; 24 November 2018		L	cancelled due to strong wind (Note: Qualification round in Ruka (originally scheduled on 23 November) was rescheduled to 24 November and finally cancelled due to strong wind.)
2	(Finland) Ruka	25 November 2018		L	(Austria) Stefan Kraft
3	(Russia) Nizhny Tagil	30 November 2018	1 December 2018	L	(Poland) Piotr Żyła
4	(Russia) Nizhny Tagil	2 December 2018		L	(Japan) Ryōyū Kobayashi
	(Germany) Titisee-Neustadt	7 December 2018	9 December 2018	L	warm weather and lack of snow
5	(Switzerland) Engelberg	14 December 2018	15 December 2018	L	(Japan) Ryōyū Kobayashi
6	(Switzerland) Engelberg	16 December 2018		L	(Japan) Ryōyū Kobayashi
7	(Germany) Oberstdorf	29 December 2018	30 December 2018	L	(Austria) Stefan Kraft
8	(Germany) Garmisch-Pa	31 December 2018	1 January 2019	L	(Poland) Dawid Kubacki
9	(Austria) Innsbruck	3 January 2019	4 January 2019	L	(Japan) Ryōyū Kobayashi
10	(Austria) Bischofshofen	6 January 2019		L	(Germany) Markus Eisenbichler
11	(Italy) Val di Fiemme	11 January 2019	12 January 2019	L	(Japan) Ryōyū Kobayashi
	(Italy) Val di Fiemme	13 January 2019		L	strong wind; after 34 competitors
12	(Poland) Zakopane	18 January 2019	20 January 2019	L	(Norway) Johann André Forfang
13	(Japan) Sapporo	25 January 2019	26 January 2019	L	(Austria) Stefan Kraft
14	(Japan) Sapporo	27 January 2019		L	(Japan) Ryōyū Kobayashi
15	(Germany) Oberstdorf	1 February 2019		F	(Norway) Johann André Forfang
16	(Germany) Oberstdorf	2 February 2019		F	(Germany) Markus Eisenbichler
17	(Germany) Oberstdorf	3 February 2019		F	(Austria) Stefan Kraft
18	(Finland) Lahti	8 February 2019	10 February 2019	L	(Japan) Ryōyū Kobayashi
19	(Germany) Willingen	15 February 2019	16 February 2019; 17 February 2019	L	(Germany) Markus Eisenbichler
20	(Norway) Oslo	8 March 2019	10 March 2019	L	(Norway) Robert Johansson
21	(Norway) Lillehammer	11 March 2019	12 March 2019	L	(Japan) Junshirō Kobayashi
22	(Norway) Trondheim	13 March 2019	14 March 2019	L	(Austria) Stefan Kraft
23	(Norway) Vikersund	15 March 2019	17 March 2019	F	(Japan) Ryōyū Kobayashi
24	(Slovenia) Planica	21 March 2019	22 March 2019	F	(Japan) Ryōyū Kobayashi

=== Women ===
No.	Place	Qualifications	Competition	Size	Winner
1	(Norway) Lillehammer	29 November 2018	30 November 2018	N	(Japan) Sara Takanashi
2	(Norway) Lillehammer	1 December 2018		N	(Germany) Juliane Seyfarth
3	(Norway) Lillehammer	1 December 2018	2 December 2018	L	(Slovenia) Ema Klinec
	(Germany) Titisee-Neustadt	7 December 2018	8 December 2018	L	warm weather and lack of snow
4	(France) Prémanon	14 December 2018	15 December 2018	N	(Germany) Katharina Althaus
5	(France) Prémanon	16 December 2018		N	(Germany) Katharina Althaus
6	(Japan) Sapporo	11 January 2019	12 January 2019	L	(Norway) Maren Lundby
7	(Japan) Sapporo	13 January 2019		L	(Germany) Ramona Straub
	(Japan) Zaō	18 January 2019		N	strong wind; all in competition
	(Japan) Zaō	20 January 2019		N	strong wind; all in competition
	(Romania) Râșnov	26 January 2019		N	only 41 competitors; all in
	(Romania) Râșnov	27 January 2019		N	only 41 competitors; all in
8	(Austria) Hinzenbach	1 February 2019	2 February 2019	N	(Norway) Maren Lundby
9	(Austria) Hinzenbach	3 February 2019		N	(Germany) Katharina Althaus
10	(Slovenia) Ljubno	7 February 2019	8 February 2019	N	(Germany) Katharina Althaus
	(Slovenia) Ljubno	10 February 2019		N	strong wind; all in competition
11	(Germany) Oberstdorf	15 February 2019	16 February 2019	L	(Norway) Maren Lundby
12	(Germany) Oberstdorf	17 February 2019		L	(Germany) Katharina Althaus
13	(Norway) Oslo	9 March 2019	10 March 2019	L	(Norway) Maren Lundby
14	(Norway) Lillehammer	11 March 2019	12 March 2019	L	(Norway) Maren Lundby
15	(Norway) Trondheim	13 March 2019	14 March 2019	L	(Norway) Maren Lundby
16	(Russia) Nizhny Tagil	16 March 2019		N	(Austria) Chiara Hölzl
	(Russia) Nizhny Tagil	17 March 2019		N	only 38 competitors; all in
17	(Russia) Chaykovsky	22 March 2019	23 March 2019	N	(Norway) Maren Lundby

== Achievements ==
First World Cup career victory

Men

- (Russia) Evgeniy Klimov (24), in his fourth season – the WC 1 in Wisła
- (Japan) Ryoyu Kobayashi (22), in his fourth season – the WC 2 in Ruka
- (Germany) Karl Geiger (25), in his seventh season – the WC 6 in Engelberg
- (Poland) Dawid Kubacki (28), in his twelfth season – the WC 13 in Val di Fiemme
- (Slovenia) Timi Zajc (18), in his second season – the WC 17 in Oberstdorf
- (Germany) Markus Eisenbichler (27), in his eighth season – the WC 27 in Planica

Women

- (Germany) Juliane Seyfarth (28), in her eighth season – the WC 1 in Lillehammer
- (Russia) Lidiia Iakovleva (17), in her second season – the WC 2 in Lillehammer

First World Cup podium

Men

- (Germany) Stephan Leyhe (26), in his seventh season – the WC 1 in Wisła
- (Japan) Ryoyu Kobayashi (22), in his fourth season – the WC 1 in Wisła
- (Austria) Daniel Huber (25), in his fifth season – the WC 6 in Engelberg
- (Japan) Yukiya Satō (23), in his fifth season – the WC 14 in Zakopane
- (Slovenia) Timi Zajc (18), in his second season – the WC 16 in Sapporo

Women

- (Germany) Juliane Seyfarth (28), in her eighth season – the WC 1 in Lillehammer
- (Russia) Lidiia Iakovleva (17), in her second season – the WC 2 in Lillehammer
- (Germany) Ramona Straub (25), in her eighth season – the WC 3 in Lillehammer
- (Norway) Anna Odine Strøm (21), in her sixth season – the WC 9 in Zaō
- (Slovenia) Urša Bogataj (23), in her eighth season – the WC 14 in Ljubno

Number of wins this season (in brackets are all-time wins)

Men

- (Japan) Ryōyū Kobayashi – 13 (13)
- (Austria) Stefan Kraft – 4 (16)
- (Poland) Kamil Stoch – 2 (33)
- (Germany) Karl Geiger – 2 (2)
- (Slovenia) Domen Prevc – 1 (5)
- (Norway) Johann André Forfang – 1 (3)
- (Norway) Robert Johansson – 1 (2)
- (Russia) Evgeniy Klimov – 1 (1)
- (Poland) Dawid Kubacki – 1 (1)
- (Slovenia) Timi Zajc – 1 (1)
- (Germany) Markus Eisenbichler – 1 (1)

Women

- (Norway) Maren Lundby – 12 (25)
- (Germany) Juliane Seyfarth – 4 (4)
- (Austria) Daniela Iraschko-Stolz – 3 (16)
- (Germany) Katharina Althaus – 3 (7)
- (Japan) Sara Takanashi – 1 (56)
- (Russia) Lidiia Iakovleva – 1 (1)

== Retirements ==
- (Norway) Andreas Stjernen - 1 victories, 7 podiums, 166 starts in WC
- (Slovenia) Robert Kranjec - 7 victories, 27 podiums, 325 starts in WC
- (Italy) Davide Bresadola
- (Italy) Sebastian Colloredo
- (Norway) Kenneth Gangnes
- (Slovenia) Tomaž Naglič
- (Switzerland) Luca Egloff
- (Austria) Andreas Kofler
- (Czech Republic) Lukáš Hlava
- (Germany) Andreas Wank
- (Czech Republic) Tomáš Vančura

== See also ==
- 2018 Grand Prix (top level summer series)
- 2018–19 FIS Continental Cup (2nd level competition)
