= Evgenii Klimov =

Russian ski jumper

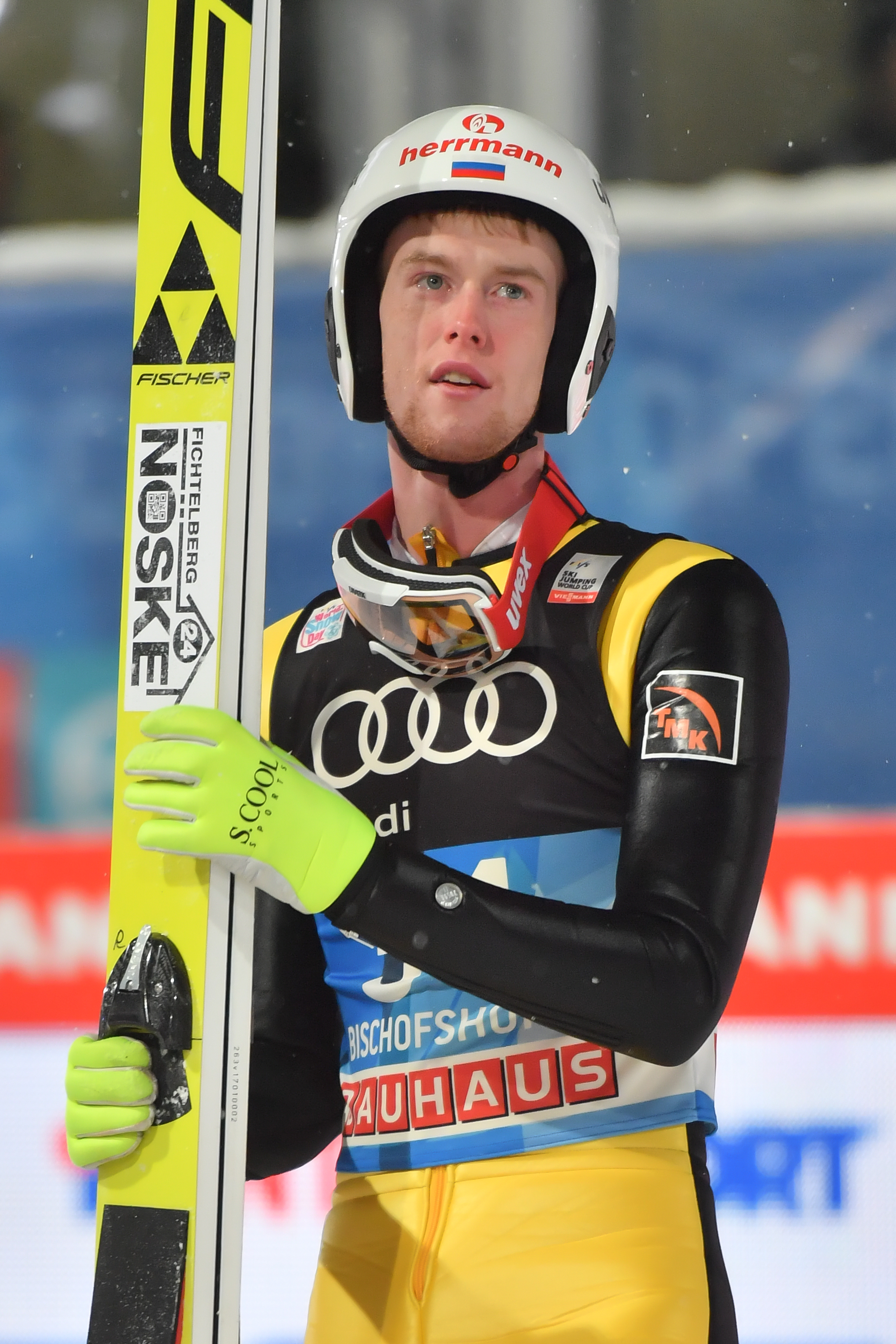
- Evgenii Klimov, FIS Ski Jumping World Cup, Four Hills Tournament, Bischofshofen 2017.

Personal information
- Native name: Евгений Дмитриевич Климов
- Full name: Evgenii Dmitriyevich Klimov
- Nationality: Russia
- Born: 3 February 1994 (age 32) Perm, Russia
- Height: 1.85 m (6 ft 1 in)

Sport
- Sport: Skiing
- Club: GBU TSTOVS; Moskovskaya oblast Ski s.

World Cup career
- Seasons: 2013–2015 (nor. combined); 2016–present (ski jumping)
- Indiv. starts: 17 (Nordic combined); 125 (ski jumping)
- Indiv. podiums: 3 (ski jumping)
- Indiv. wins: 1 (ski jumping)
- Team starts: 6 (Nordic combined); 33 (ski jumping)

Achievements and titles
- Personal bests: 237 m (778 ft); Planica, 11 December 2020
Medal record
Women's ski jumping
Representing ROC
Olympic Games
Silver medal – second place	2022 Beijing	Mixed team
- Updated on 6 March 2022

Evgenii Dmitriyevich Klimov (Russian: Евгений Дмитриевич Климов; born 3 February 1994) is a Russian ski jumper and a former Nordic combined skier. He is the first Russian in history who won an individual ski jumping World Cup event for men. He also took the Grand Prix 2018 overall title in ski jumping. He also has the national record for the longest ski jump with 237m. At the 2022 Olympics, he was part of the mixed team which won the silver medal.

== Career ==
=== Nordic combined ===
Klimov competed at the 2014 Winter Olympics for Russia. He placed 45th in the normal hill Nordic combined event, after being 3rd in the ski jumping portion, and 9th in the team event.

As of September 2014, his best showing at the World Championships is 12th, in the 2013 team event. His best individual finish is 49th, in the 2013 large hill event.

Klimov made his World Cup debut in February 2013. His best individual finish is 30th, at a large hill event at Kuusamo in 2013/14. His best World Cup overall finish is 80th, in 2013/14.

=== Ski jumping ===
He ended his Nordic combined career and switched to a ski jumping career in 2015. He won two medals in ski jumping at the 2015 Winter Universiade in Osrblie, Slovakia. He made a World Cup debut in 2015/16 season.

Klimov won the 2018 FIS Ski Jumping Grand Prix. He then won his first World Cup event in Wisła, becoming the first Russian to achieve that feat.

== World Cup ==
=== Standings ===
Season	Overall	4H	SF	RA	W6	T5	P7
2015/16	56	41	—	N/A	N/A	N/A	N/A
2016/17	17	12	23	40	N/A	N/A	N/A
2017/18	65	43	—	34	—	N/A	44
2018/19	12	15	10	10	8	N/A	22
2019/20	31	30	—	13	—	32	N/A
2020/21	35	34	25	N/A	—	N/A	30
2021/22	32	19		—	N/A	N/A	

=== Individual wins ===
No.	Season	Date	Location	Hill	Size
1	2018/19	18 November 2018	(Poland) Wisła	Malinka HS134	LH

=== Individual starts (125) ===
Season	1	2	3	4	5	6	7	8	9	10	11	12	13	14	15	16	17	18	19	20	21	22	23	24	25	26	27	28	29	Points
2015/16	Klingenthal	Lillehammer	Lillehammer	Nizhny Tagil	Nizhny Tagil	Engelberg	Engelberg	Oberstdorf	Garmisch-Partenkirchen	Innsbruck	Bischofshofen	Willingen	Zakopane	Sapporo	Sapporo	Trondheim	Vikersund	Vikersund	Vikersund	Lahti	Lahti	Kuopio	Almaty	Almaty	Wisła	Titisee-Neustadt	Planica	Planica	Planica	21
2015/16	32	35	35	18	46	–	–	28	43	q	q	41	28	–	–	50	41	q	q	46	q	–	29	38	–	–	–	–	–	21
2016/17	Kuusamo	Kuusamo	Klingenthal	Lillehammer	Lillehammer	Engelberg	Engelberg	Oberstdorf	Garmisch-Partenkirchen	Innsbruck	Bischofshofen	Wisła	Wisła	Zakopane	Willingen	Oberstdorf	Oberstdorf	Sapporo	Sapporo	Pyeongchang	Pyeongchang	Oslo	Trondheim	Vikersund	Planica	Planica				382
2016/17	45	12	16	39	20	18	16	13	18	3	16	38	19	10	11	17	18	16	42	12	7	–	12	36	29	19				382
2017/18	Wisła	Kuusamo	Nizhny Tagil	Nizhny Tagil	Titisee-Neustadt	Engelberg	Engelberg	Oberstdorf	Garmisch-Partenkirchen	Innsbruck	Bischofshofen	Tauplitz	Zakopane	Willingen	Willingen	Lahti	Oslo	Lillehammer	Trondheim	Vikersund	Planica	Planica								7
2017/18	49	q	48	39	q	–	–	44	26	–	–	–	–	–	–	29	50	q	32	33	q	–								7
2018/19	Wisła	Kuusamo	Kuusamo	Nizhny Tagil	Nizhny Tagil	Engelberg	Engelberg	Oberstdorf	Garmisch-Partenkirchen	Innsbruck	Bischofshofen	Val di Fiemme	Val di Fiemme	Zakopane	Sapporo	Sapporo	Oberstdorf	Oberstdorf	Oberstdorf	Lahti	Willingen	Willingen	Oslo	Lillehammer	Trondheim	Vikersund	Planica	Planica		592
2018/19	1	31	26	11	8	5	8	20	16	19	26	–	–	11	–	–	23	29	2	–	7	13	22	11	6	14	11	10		592
2019/20	Wisła	Kuusamo	Nizhny Tagil	Nizhny Tagil	Klingenthal	Engelberg	Engelberg	Oberstdorf	Garmisch-Partenkirchen	Innsbruck	Bischofshofen	Val di Fiemme	Val di Fiemme	Titisee-Neustadt	Titisee-Neustadt	Zakopane	Sapporo	Sapporo	Willingen	Tauplitz	Tauplitz	Râșnov	Râșnov	Lahti	Lahti	Oslo	Lillehammer			140
2019/20	40	–	41	50	37	16	37	22	22	q	39	22	q	11	45	24	38	28	–	–	–	23	35	19	30	24	7			140
2020/21	Wisła	Ruka	Ruka	Nizhny Tagil	Nizhny Tagil	Engelberg	Engelberg	Oberstdorf	Garmisch-Partenkirchen	Innsbruck	Bischofshofen	Titisee-Neustadt	Titisee-Neustadt	Zakopane	Lahti	Willingen	Willingen	Klingenthal	Klingenthal	Zakopane	Zakopane	Râșnov	Planica	Planica	Planica					110
2020/21	31	–	–	7	29	17	36	26	50	47	23	41	19	–	–	–	–	–	–	27	29	20	–	15	–					110
2021/22	Nizhny Tagil	Nizhny Tagil	Ruka	Ruka	Wisła	Klingenthal	Klingenthal	Engelberg	Engelberg	Oberstdorf	Garmisch-Partenkirchen	Bischofshofen	Bischofshofen	Bischofshofen	Zakopane	Titisee-Neustadt	Titisee-Neustadt	Willingen	Willingen	Lahti	Lahti	Lillehammer	Oslo	Oslo	Oberstdorf	Oberstdorf	Planica	Planica		163
2021/22	20	q	28	16	30	36	46	14	5	15	19	33	30	33	29	24	26	–	–	14	22	–	–	–						163
