= Daniel Huber (ski jumper) =

Austrian ski jumper (born 1993)

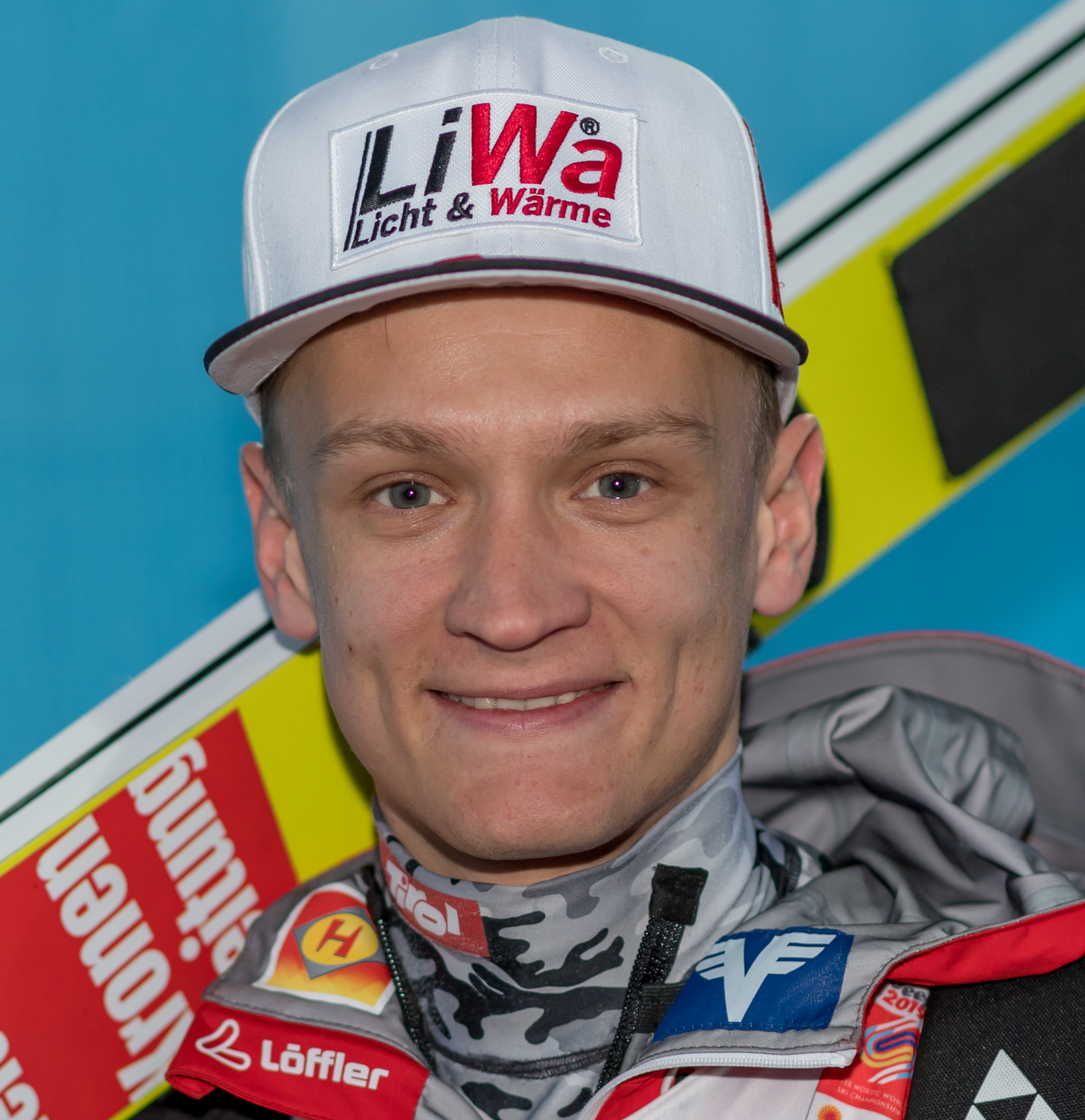
- Huber in 2019

Personal information
- Nationality: Austria
- Born: 2 January 1993 (age 33) Salzburg, Austria
- Height: 1.78 m (5 ft 10 in)

Sport
- Sport: Skiing
- Club: SC Seekirchen-Salzburg

World Cup career
- Seasons: 2017–2026
- Indiv. starts: 146
- Indiv. podiums: 8
- Indiv. wins: 3
- Updated on 25 January 2025

Daniel Huber (born 2 January 1993) is an Austrian former ski jumper.

He is the older brother of Stefan Huber, also a ski jumper.

== Career ==
He won a gold medal at the 2022 Winter Olympics in the team event and is a two-time team silver medalist of the World Ski Championships in 2019 and 2021. Huber also won the Ski Flying World Cup small crystal globe in the 2023/2024 season and the tour Planica 7 in 2024.

Huber's debut in FIS Ski Jumping World Cup took place in Sapporo in 2016.

== World Cup ==
=== Standings ===
Season	Overall	4H	SF	RA
2016–17	71	61	—	—
2017–18	28	49	36	48
2018–19	16	9	19	22
2019–20	18	26	18	24
2020–21	12	10	6	—
2021–22	11	9	22	10
2023–24	15	—	1st place, gold medalist(s)	3rd place, bronze medalist(s)

=== Individual victories ===
No.	Season	Date	Location	Hill	Size
1	2021/22	6 January 2022	(Austria) Bischofshofen	Paul-Ausserleitner-Schanze HS140	LH
2	2023–24	17 March 2024	(Norway) Vikersund	Vikersundbakken HS240	FH
3	2023–24	24 March 2024	(Slovenia) Planica	Letalnica bratov Gorišek HS240	FH
