= Clemens Aigner =

Austrian ski jumper (born 1993)

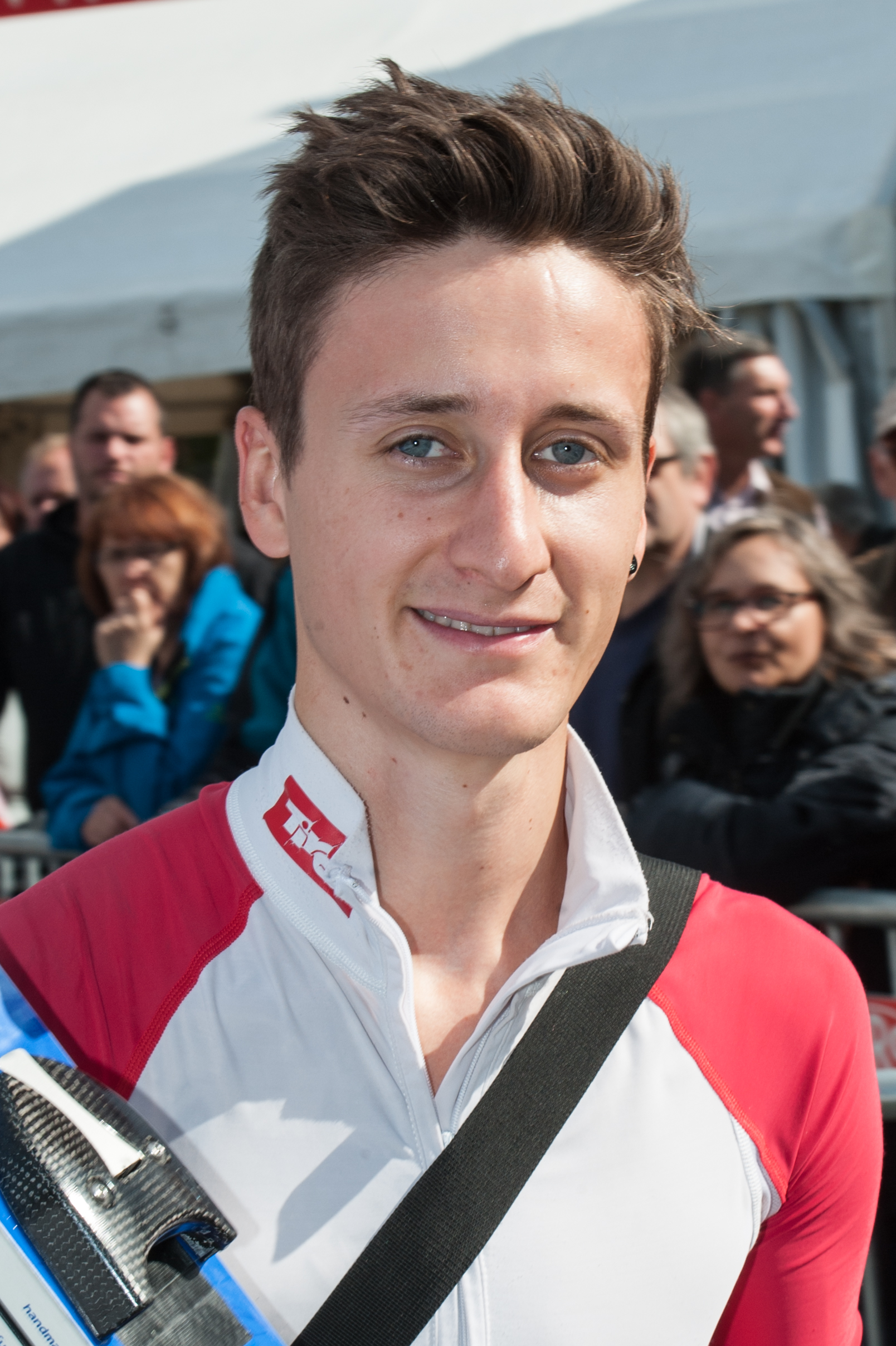
- Aigner in 2015

Personal information
- Born: 2 February 1993 (age 32)

Sport
- Country: Austria
- Sport: Ski jumping

Clemens Aigner (born 2 February 1993) is an Austrian ski jumper who competes internationally.

He competed at the 2018 Winter Olympics.
