= Elisabeth Raudaschl =

Austrian ski jumper

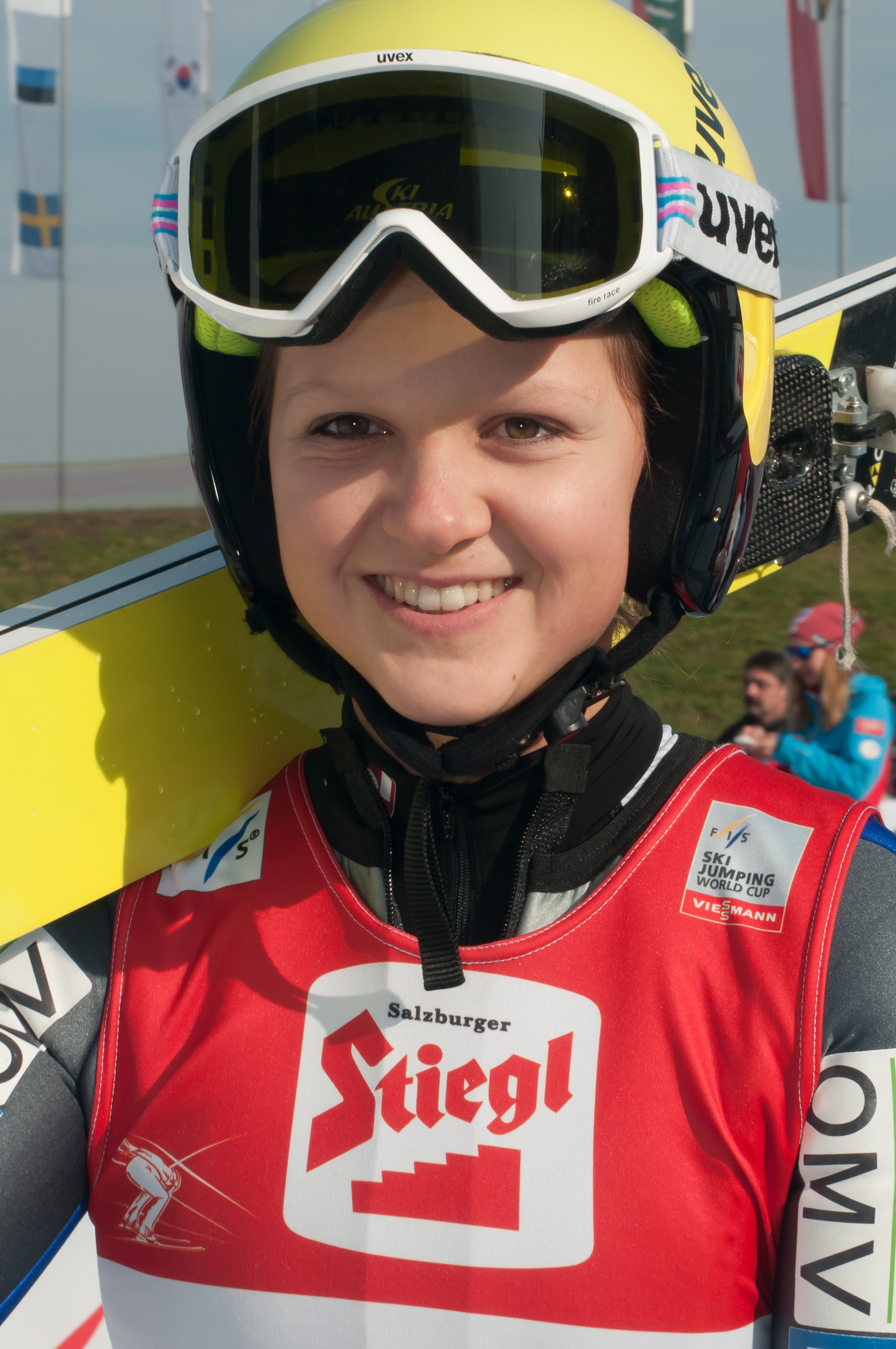
- Raudaschl in Hinzenbach, 2015

Personal information
- Nationality: Austria
- Born: 7 November 1997 (age 28)

Sport
- Sport: Skiing
- Club: WSV Bad Ischl

World Cup career
- Seasons: 2014–present
- Indiv. starts: 23
- Team starts: 1
Medal record
Women's ski jumping
Junior World Championships
Silver medal – second place	2015 Almaty	Individual NH
Bronze medal – third place	2017 Park City	Team NH
Girls' ski jumping
European Youth Olympic Festival
Bronze medal – third place	2013 Râșnov	Mixed team NH
- Updated on 25 February 2018

Elisabeth Raudaschl (born 7 November 1997) is an Austrian ski jumper who has competed at World Cup level since the 2013/14 season.

== Career ==
Raudaschl's best individual result is 14th place in Lillehammer on 4 December 2015; her best team result is 6th place in Hinterzarten on 16 December 2017, in what was the first ever women's World Cup team competition. At the Junior World Championships, she won an individual silver medal in 2015, and team bronze in 2017. She also won a mixed team bronze at the 2013 European Youth Olympic Winter Festival.
