= Râșnov Ski Jump =

Ski jumping hill in Romania

Coordinates: 45°34′17″N 25°28′15″E

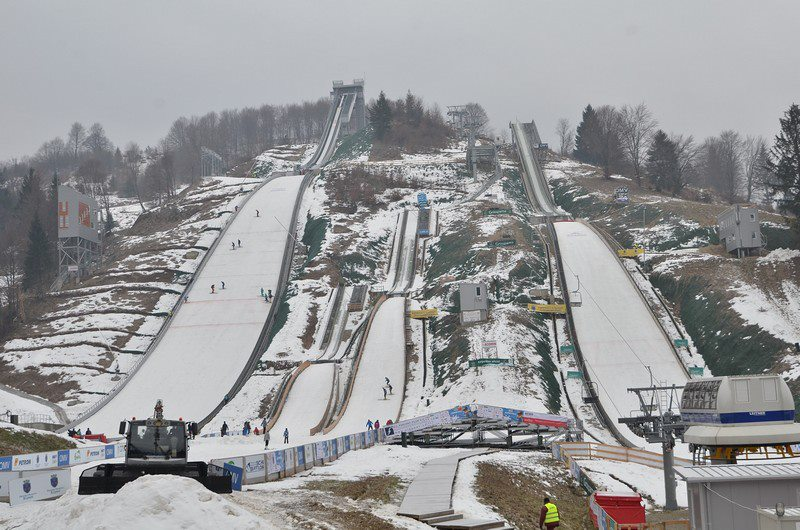
- Location: Cărbunării Valley; Râșnov; Romania
- Opened: 2012

Size
- K–point: 90 m
- Hill size: 97 m
- Hill record: Maren Lundby (NOR); 102.0 m (2018)

Râșnov Ski Jump (Romanian: Trambulina Valea Cărbunării) is a ski jumping hill located within the Râșnov Sports Complex, in the Cărbunării Valley, southeast of Râșnov, Romania. It is the country's second largest ski jumping hill after the disused 110-meter Tintina.

The whole ski jumping complex consists of four hills, with K-points of 90, 64, 35 and 15 meters, respectively.

The 90-meter hill was designed by a Romanian architect and opened in 2012. The three other smaller hills were designed by the Austrian architect Christian Aske.

== History ==
Râșnov ski jumping hill has been in existence since 1936. The newly built jumps are located on the outskirts of Râșnov, three kilometers southeast of the city center. The hill record is 103 metres, set on 22 February 2020.

The project was supported by a public–private partnership between the Ministry of Regional Development and Tourism of Romania and OMV Petrom. The investments were estimated at €15 million.

== Facilities ==
All four ski jumps are equipped with floodlight facilities, lifts, snow cannons and plastic mats, which allows them to be also used in summer.

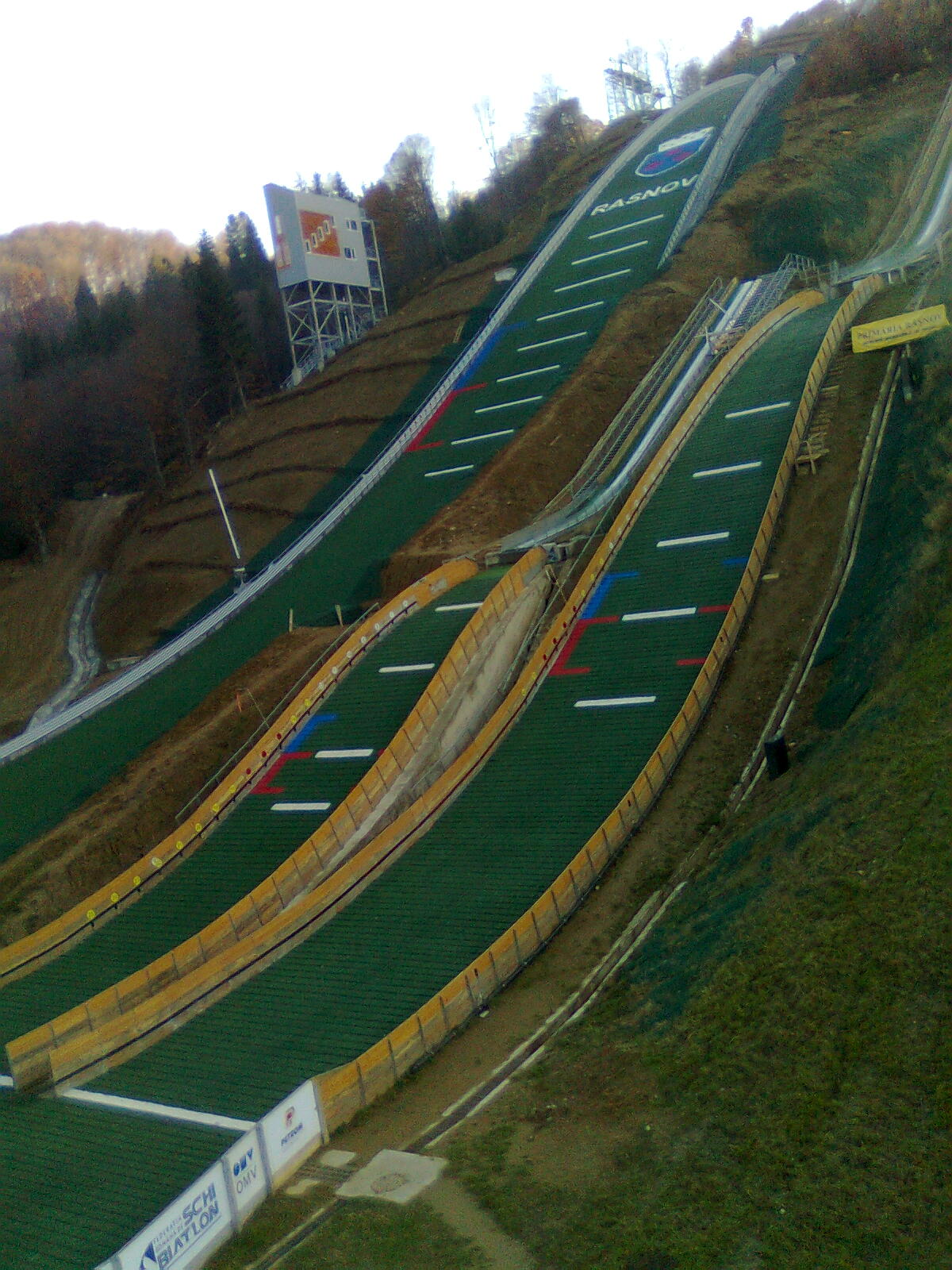

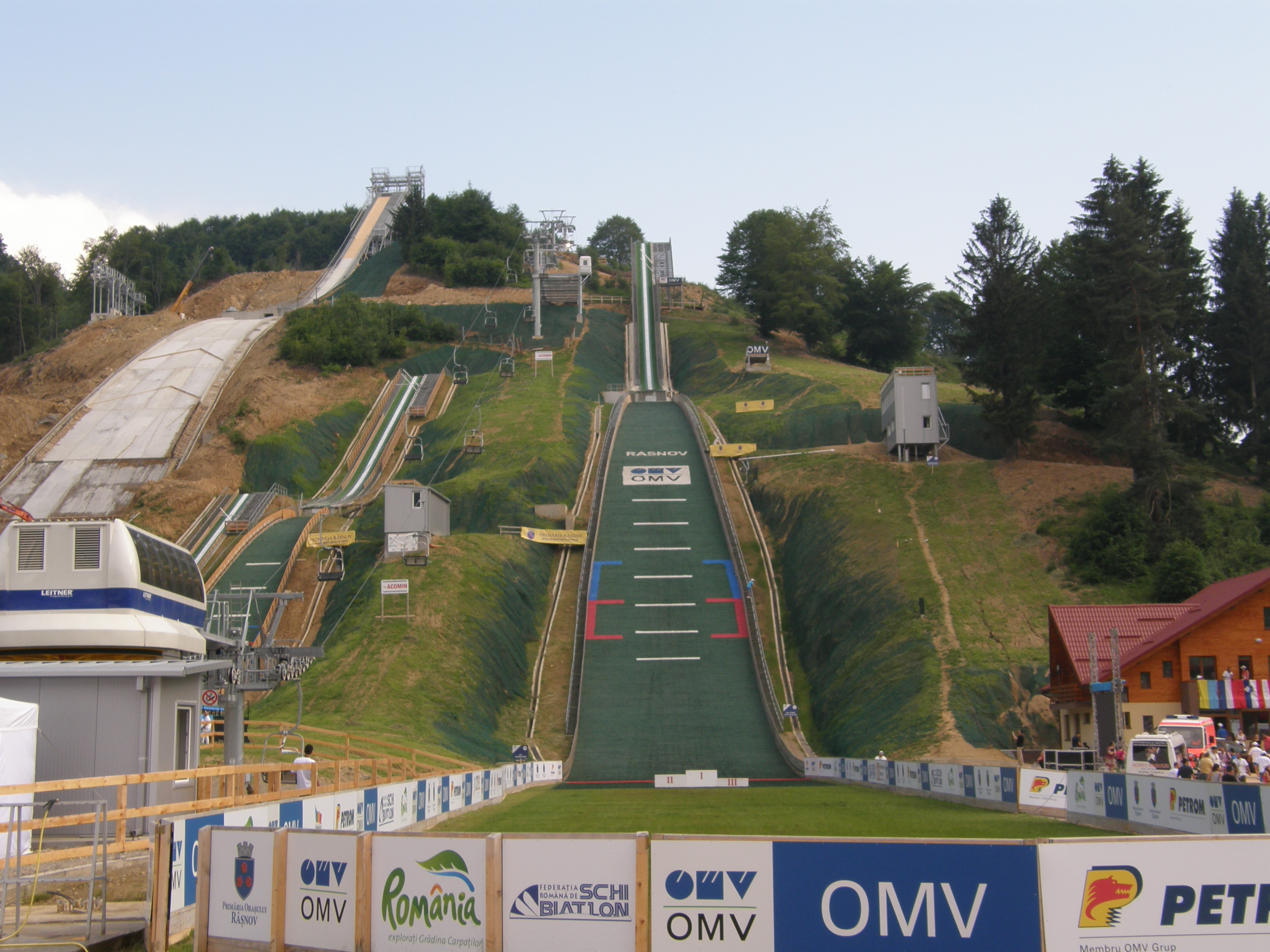

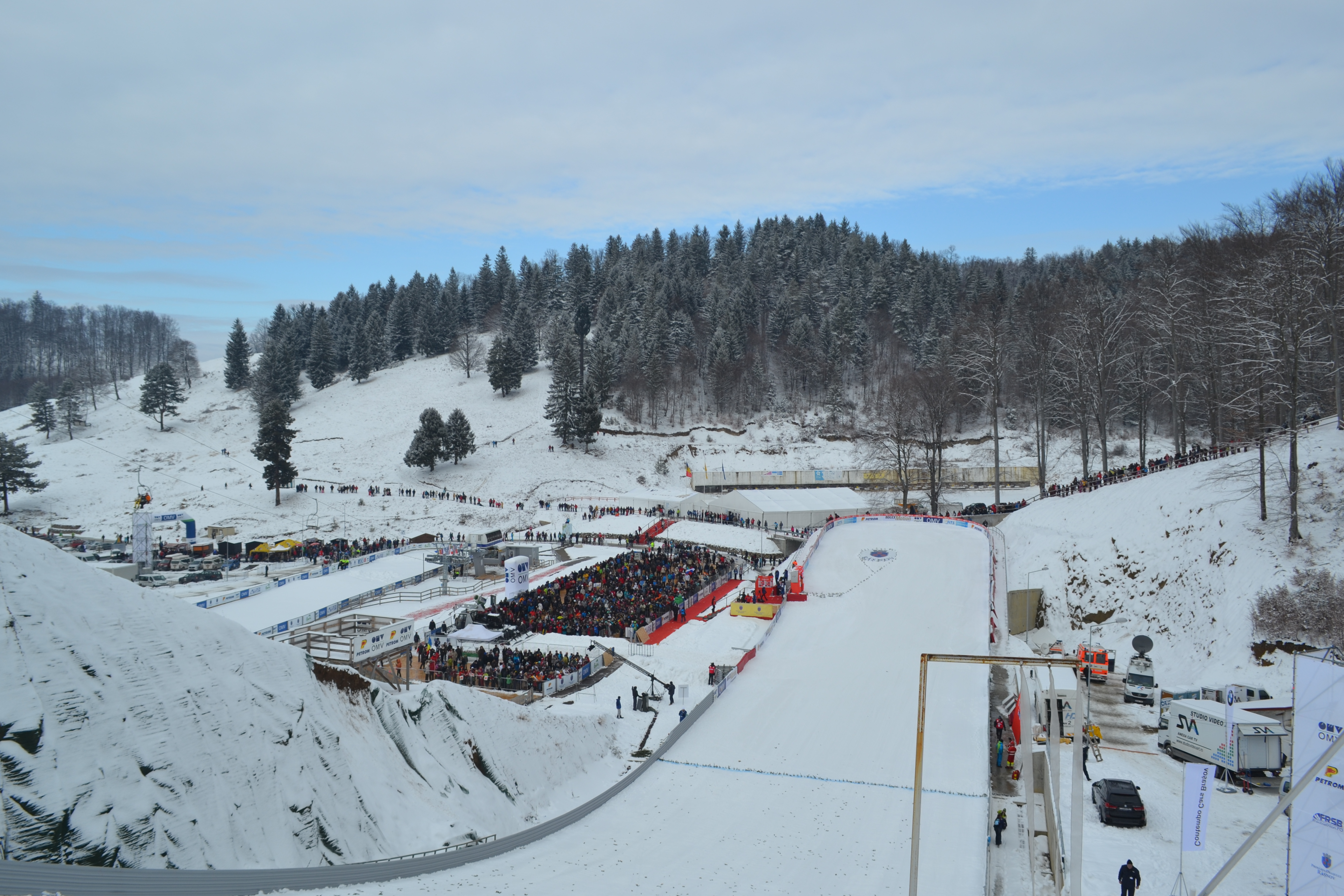

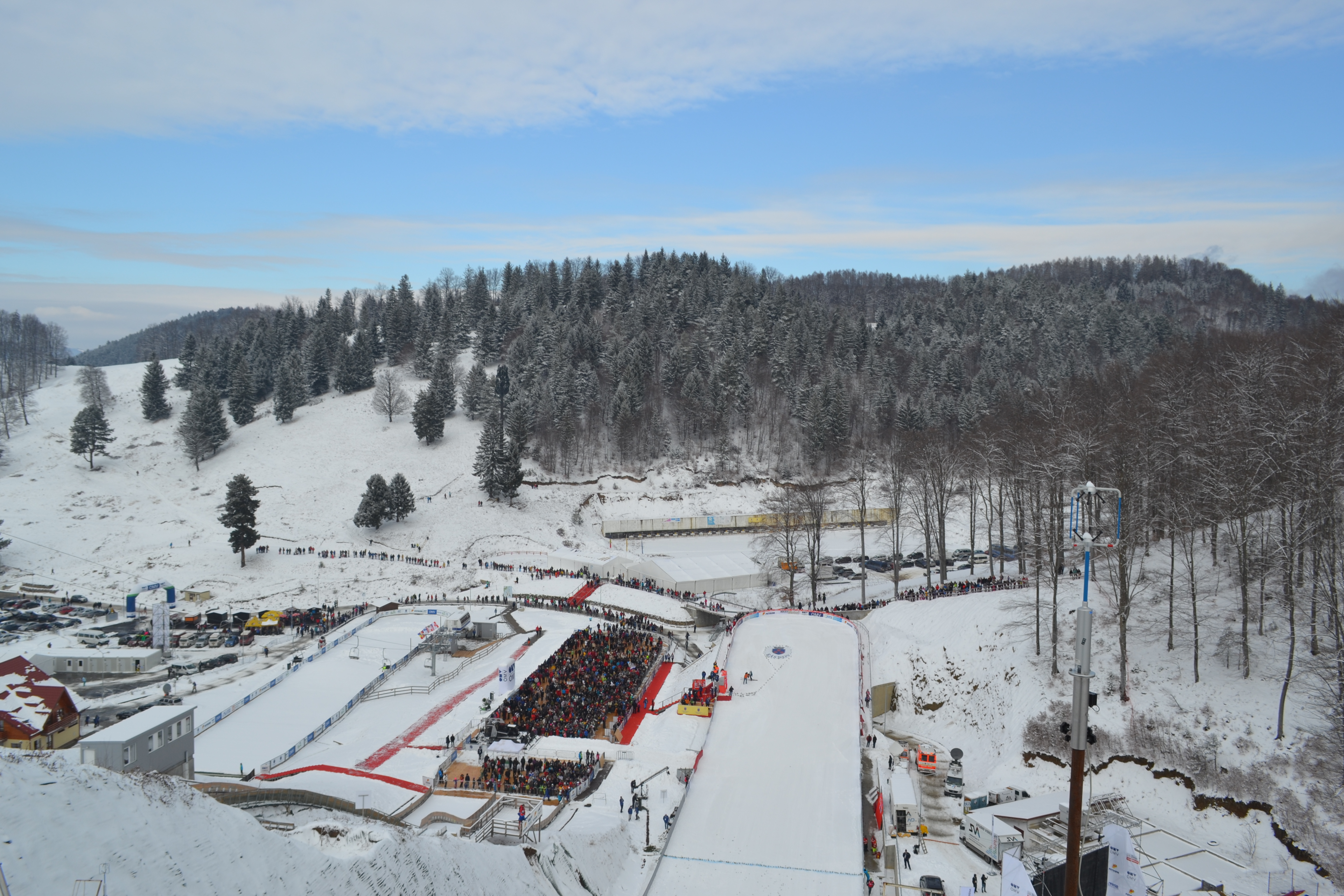

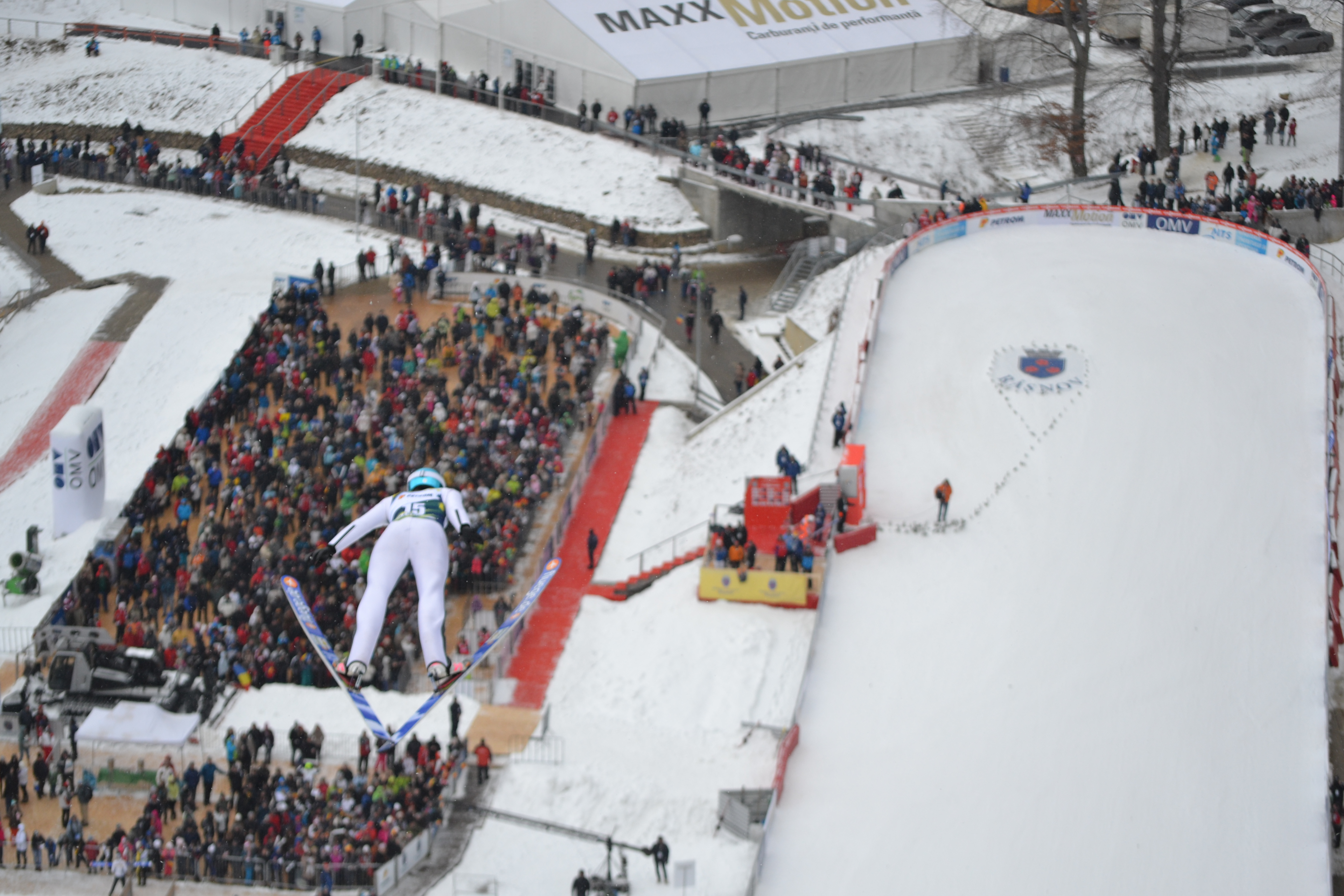

== Events ==
The first official competition hosted was the inaugural round of the 2012 FIS Cup summer edition, held on 9 May 2012. The event attracted the participation of the notable ski jumpers Thomas Morgenstern and Robert Kranjec. Between 18 and 22 February 2013, the large hill hosted the ski jumping events at the European Youth Olympic Winter Festival.

In 2013, the venue also hosted the final round of the FIS Cup summer edition (on 28–29 September). In 2014, it hosted a round of the FIS Cup winter edition (on 22–23 February), a round in the ladies' calendar of the FIS Ski Jumping World Cup (on 1–2 March) and again the final round in the FIS Cup summer edition (on 27–28 September).

In 2015, the venue hosted again a two-day round in the ladies' calendar of the FIS Ski Jumping World Cup (on 7–8 February) and the final round in the FIS Cup summer edition (on 26–27 September). Previously a round of the FIS Cup winter edition (planned on 24–25 January) had been canceled.

In 2016, the venue hosted the ski jumping events of the FIS Junior World Ski Championships (between 22 and 28 February), a round in the ladies' calendar of the FIS Ski Jumping World Cup (on 5–6 March) and the final round of the FIS Cup summer edition (on 1–2 October).

In 2017, the venue hosted again a round in the ladies' calendar of the FIS Ski Jumping World Cup (on 27–29 January), and the final round of the FIS Cup summer edition, both men's and ladies'. The ladies' round was won by Romania's representative Daniela Haralambie, who also became the champion of the series.

In 2018, another ladies' FIS Ski Jumping World Cup round took place between 2 and 4 March, and between 21 and 23 September, the venue will host a round in the men's FIS Ski Jumping Grand Prix.
