= Râșnov =

- Town
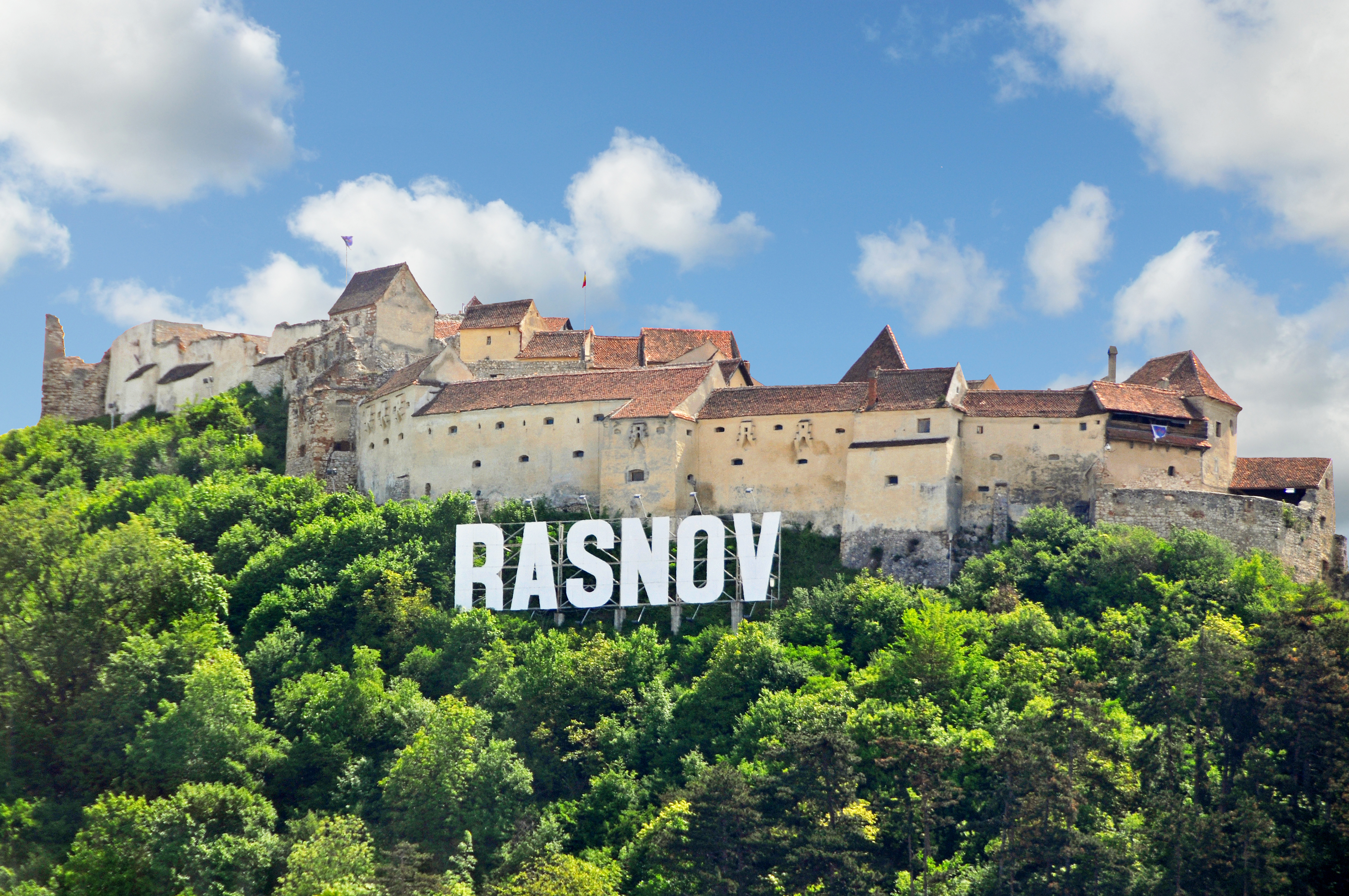
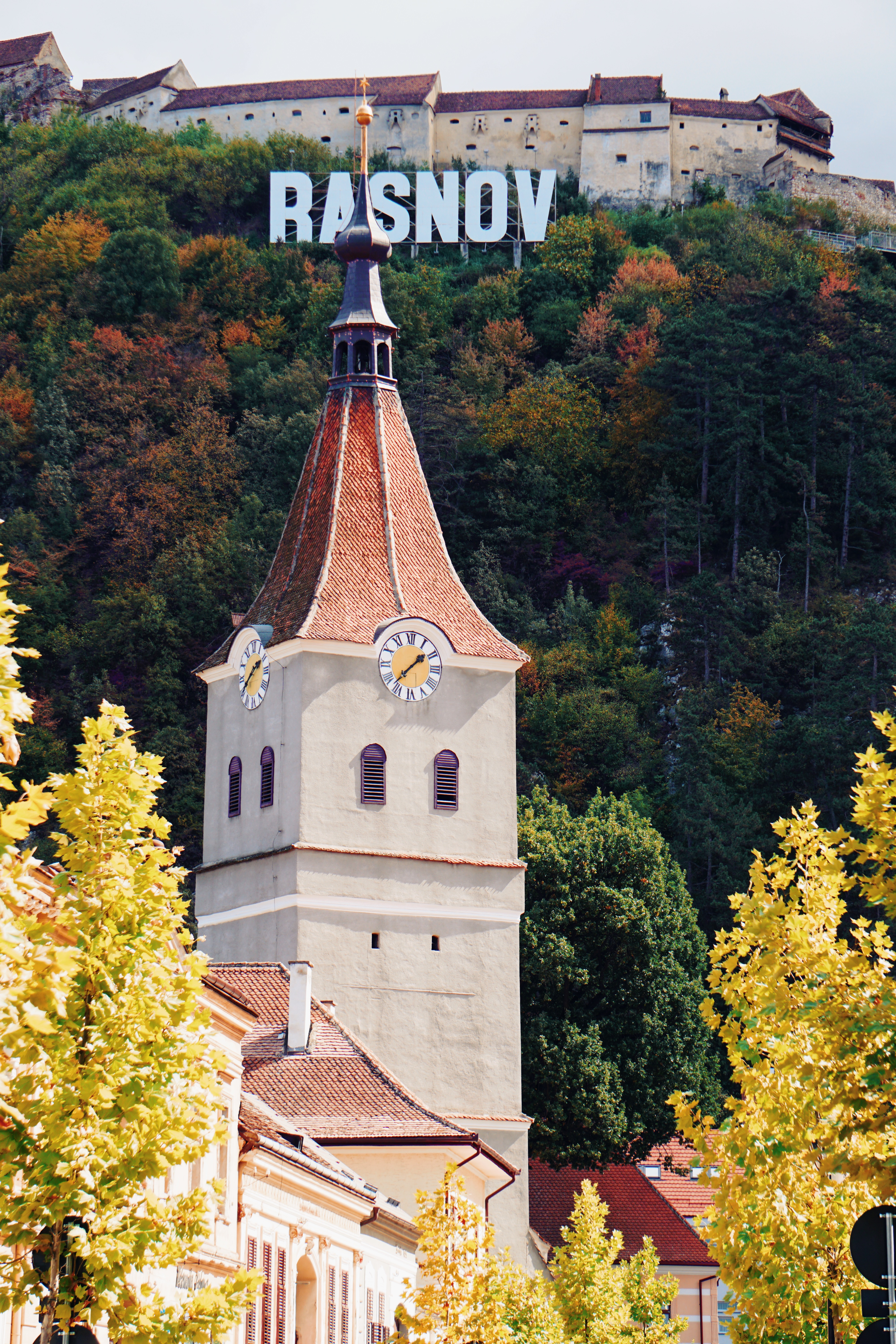
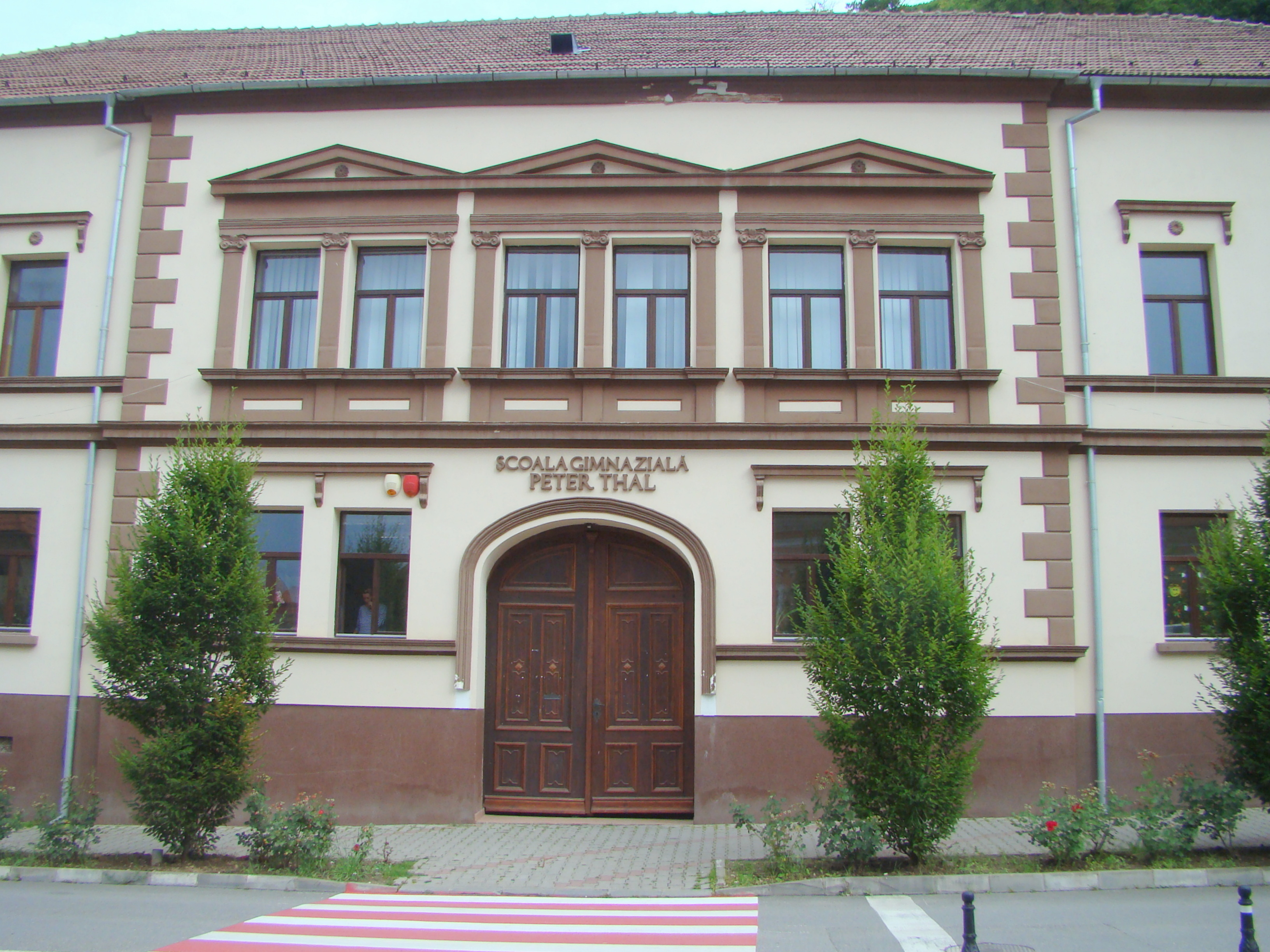
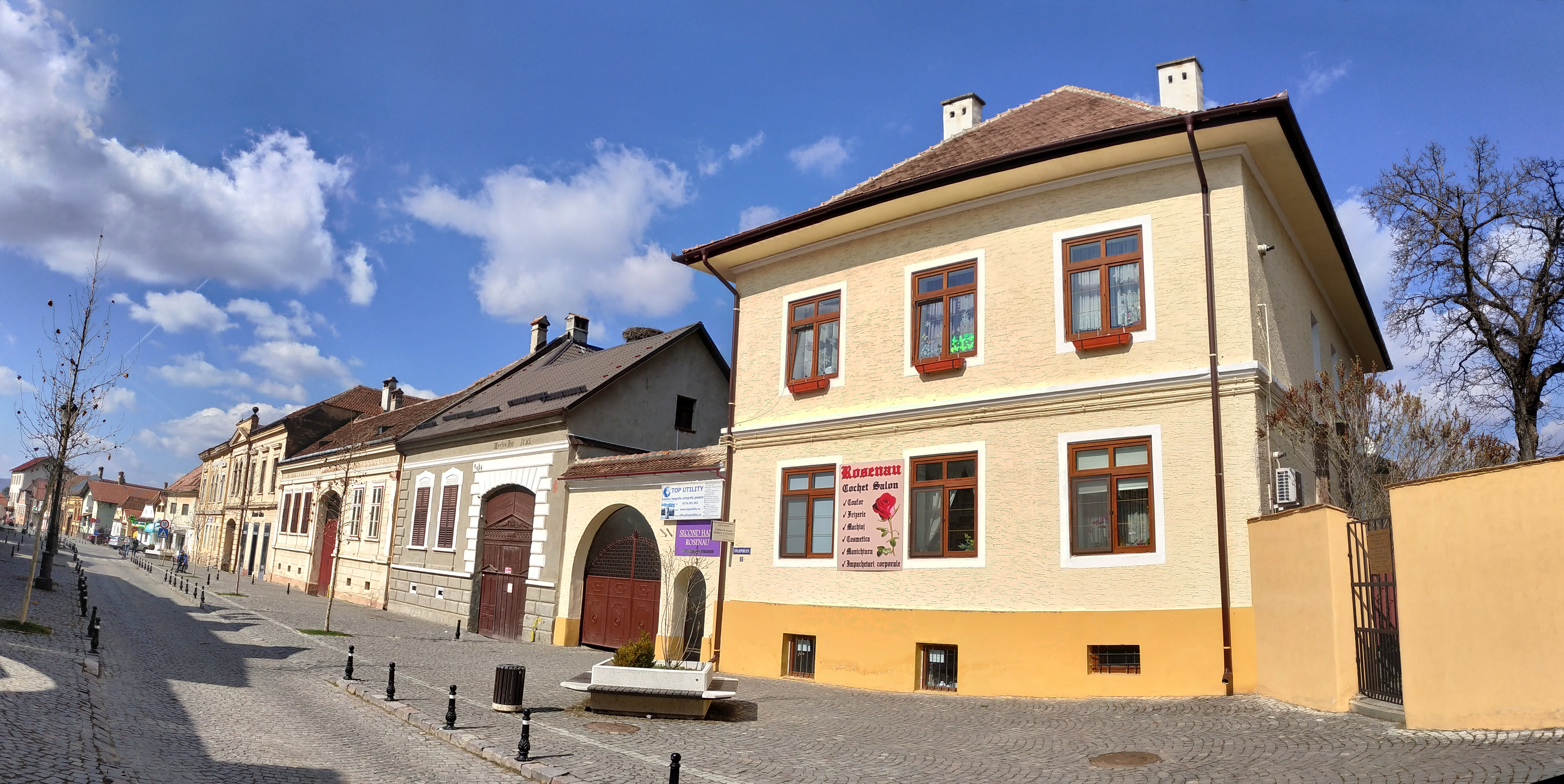
- Râșnov Fortress Evangelical Church and Citadel Peter Thal Gymnasium Republicii Street

- Coat of arms

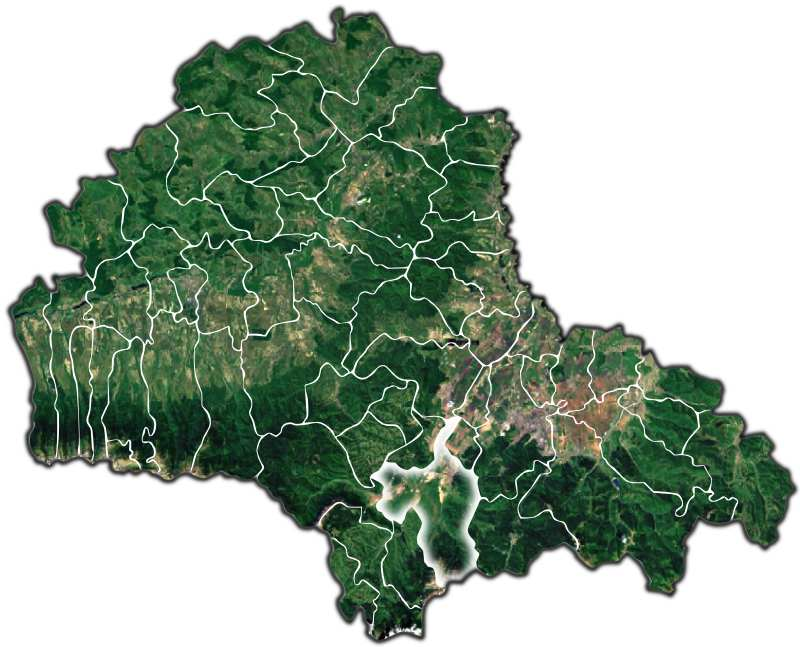
- Location in Brașov County

- Location in Romania
- Coordinates: 45°35′36″N 25°27′37″E
- Country: Romania
- County: Brașov

Government
  - Mayor (2024–2028): Horia-Mihai Motrescu (USR)
- Area: 164.36 km^{2} (63.46 sq mi)
- Elevation: 650 m (2,130 ft)
- Population (2021-12-01): 15,920
  - Density: 96.86/km^{2} (250.9/sq mi)
- Time zone: UTC+02:00 (EET)
  - Summer (DST): UTC+03:00 (EEST)
- Postal code: 505400
- Area code: (+40) 02 68
- Vehicle reg.: BV
- Website: primariarasnov.ro

Râșnov (Romanian pronunciation: [ˈrɨʃnov]; German: Rosenau; Hungarian: Barcarozsnyó; Transylvanian Saxon dialect: Ruusenåå; Latin: Rosnovia) is a town in Brașov County, Transylvania, Romania with a population of 15,920 as of 2021.

It is located at about 15 km (9.3 mi) southwest of the city of Brașov and about the same distance from Bran, on DN73, a road that links Wallachia and Transylvania.

== History ==
Historical population
Year	Pop.	±%
1850	4,094	—
1920	4,876	+19.1%
1930	5,347	+9.7%
1941	5,732	+7.2%
1956	7,974	+39.1%
1966	9,700	+21.6%
1977	13,792	+42.2%
1992	16,384	+18.8%
2002	16,242	−0.9%
2011	15,022	−7.5%
2021	15,920	+6.0%
Source: Census data

The Roman fort of Cumidava was discovered in 1856 near the town.

The Râșnov Fortress was first built as a castle by the Teutonic Knights in the years 1211–1225. Râșnov was mentioned for the first time in 1331 as Rosnou and again in 1388 as villa Rosarum. While the village was razed many times in its history by Tatars, Turks, and Wallachians, the fortress was conquered only once, in 1612, by Gabriel Báthory.

== Legend of the fortress well ==
There is a legend attached to Râșnov Fortress. During a particularly long siege of the fortress, the citizens of Râșnov were concerned about the lack of available fresh drinking water. Two Turkish soldiers, having been captured earlier, were put to the task of digging a well in the centre of the fortress. These two men were assured that they would be given their freedom once the well was completed. According to local legend, it took them 17 years to finish the well, but they were still killed afterwards. This famous well still sits in the centre of Râșnov Fortress, and is 143 metres (469 feet) deep.

== Climate ==
Râșnov has a warm-summer humid continental climate (Dfb in the Köppen climate classification).

Climate data for Râșnov
Month	Jan	Feb	Mar	Apr	May	Jun	Jul	Aug	Sep	Oct	Nov	Dec	Year
Mean daily maximum °C (°F)	0.3 (32.5)	2.2 (36.0)	6.8 (44.2)	12.8 (55.0)	17.6 (63.7)	20.9 (69.6)	22.8 (73.0)	23.1 (73.6)	18.1 (64.6)	12.9 (55.2)	7.8 (46.0)	1.9 (35.4)	12.3 (54.1)
Daily mean °C (°F)	−3.8 (25.2)	−2.2 (28.0)	2.1 (35.8)	7.9 (46.2)	13 (55)	16.7 (62.1)	18.5 (65.3)	18.5 (65.3)	13.6 (56.5)	8.2 (46.8)	3.5 (38.3)	−1.9 (28.6)	7.8 (46.1)
Mean daily minimum °C (°F)	−7.9 (17.8)	−6.5 (20.3)	−2.5 (27.5)	2.6 (36.7)	7.8 (46.0)	11.9 (53.4)	13.7 (56.7)	13.7 (56.7)	9.3 (48.7)	4.1 (39.4)	0.1 (32.2)	−5.4 (22.3)	3.4 (38.1)
Average precipitation mm (inches)	46 (1.8)	44 (1.7)	62 (2.4)	93 (3.7)	134 (5.3)	138 (5.4)	136 (5.4)	110 (4.3)	74 (2.9)	59 (2.3)	52 (2.0)	51 (2.0)	999 (39.2)
Source: https://en.climate-data.org/europe/romania/brasov/rasnov-15497/

== Culture ==
=== Music ===
As of August 2013, Râșnov became the host of the biggest extreme metal festival in Romania, known as Rockstadt Extreme Fest, which was held at the foot of the fortress hill. The festival featured bands such as Decapitated, Napalm Death, Gojira, Carach Angren, Rotting Christ, Septicflesh, Primordial, Dimmu Borgir, Kreator, Lamb Of God, Bullet For My Valentine, Heaven Shall Burn, Parkway Drive, Sleep Token, Architects, Stick To Your Guns, Knocked Loose, Unearth among many others.

=== Film ===
The American film Cold Mountain (2002) was shot to a large degree in the area around Râșnov.

== Sports ==
Râșnov Sports Complex was built just outside the town in Cărbunării Valley, for 2013 European Youth Winter Olympic Festival, which was hosted in the nearby city of Brașov.

Two ski jumping events took place in Râșnov, as part of the Women's Ski Jumping World Cup 2013/2014 competition. The events were scheduled for March 2014, on the "Valea Cărbunării" slope. During the 2019–20 World Cup, both women and men had events in Râșnov..

== Notable people ==
- Erich Bergel (1930–1998), German trumpet player and conductor
- Gheorghe Cimpoia (born 1939), biathlete
- Carol Haidu (1942–2022), footballer
- Adrian Veștea (born 1973), politician
- Nicolae Veștea (born 1950), biathlete
- Ioan Vlădea (1907–1976), engineer

== See also ==
- List of castles in Romania
- Tourism in Romania
- Villages with fortified churches in Transylvania
