= FIS Nordic World Ski Championships 2019 – Women's individual normal hill =

Women's individual normal hill at the FIS Nordic World Ski Championships 2019
- Location: Seefeld in Tirol, Austria
- Dates: 27 February
- Competitors: 53 from 18 nations
- Winning points: 259.6

Medalists
gold medal	Maren Lundby	Norway
silver medal	Katharina Althaus	Germany
bronze medal	Daniela Iraschko-Stolz	Austria

The Women's individual normal hill competition at the FIS Nordic World Ski Championships 2019 was held on 27 February 2019. A qualification was held prior to the competition round.

== Results ==
=== Qualification ===
The qualification was started at 15:00.

Rank	Bib	Name	Country	Distance (m)	Points	Notes
1	52	Katharina Althaus	Germany	106.5	130.7	Q
2	53	Maren Lundby	Norway	103.5	125.3	Q
3	43	Urša Bogataj	Slovenia	100.0	118.2	Q
4	41	Chiara Hölzl	Austria	99.0	117.1	Q
5	48	Nika Križnar	Slovenia	99.5	115.2	Q
5	42	Ramona Straub	Germany	98.0	115.2	Q
7	39	Sofia Tikhonova	Russia	98.5	113.2	Q
8	40	Yuki Ito	Japan	96.5	111.5	Q
9	47	Eva Pinkelnig	Austria	97.5	111.0	Q
10	49	Carina Vogt	Germany	97.5	110.0	Q
10	25	Daniela Haralambie	Romania	97.0	110.0	Q
12	36	Silje Opseth	Norway	95.5	109.8	Q
13	44	Lidiya Iakovleva	Russia	95.5	109.5	Q
14	51	Sara Takanashi	Japan	96.5	108.5	Q
15	45	Daniela Iraschko-Stolz	Austria	97.0	108.4	Q
16	50	Juliane Seyfarth	Germany	96.5	107.2	Q
17	29	Jerneja Brecl	Slovenia	94.5	106.9	Q
18	34	Jacqueline Seifriedsberger	Austria	93.0	104.9	Q
19	37	Lara Malsiner	Italy	95.5	103.6	Q
20	30	Elena Runggaldier	Italy	92.0	103.3	Q
21	24	Anna Shpyneva	Russia	95.0	103.1	Q
22	20	Ingebjørg Saglien Bråten	Norway	94.5	102.3	Q
23	32	Špela Rogelj	Slovenia	91.5	102.1	Q
24	33	Nozomi Maruyama	Japan	92.0	101.5	Q
25	35	Anna Rupprecht	Germany	91.5	100.8	Q
26	18	Kamila Karpiel	Poland	93.5	100.3	Q
27	22	Nita Englund	United States	92.5	98.6	Q
28	23	Joséphine Pagnier	France	92.0	97.7	Q
29	46	Anna Odine Strøm	Norway	92.5	97.4	Q
30	31	Yūka Setō	Japan	90.0	96.7	Q
31	38	Alexandra Kustova	Russia	91.5	94.4	Q
32	28	Léa Lemare	France	87.5	92.5	Q
33	12	Štěpánka Ptáčková	Czech Republic	86.5	91.9	Q
34	27	Lucile Morat	France	87.5	89.7	Q
35	21	Océane Avocat Gros	France	86.0	87.0	Q
36	5	Veronika Shishkina	Kazakhstan	85.5	86.4	Q
37	19	Kinga Rajda	Poland	86.5	85.7	Q
38	16	Karolína Indráčková	Czech Republic	85.0	84.1	Q
39	17	Natalie Eilers	Canada	82.5	81.3	Q
40	9	Susanna Forsström	Finland	83.5	80.3	Q
41	14	Zdeňka Pešatová	Czech Republic	80.5	79.4	
42	2	Valentina Sderzhikova	Kazakhstan	81.5	78.0	
43	6	Marta Křepelková	Czech Republic	79.5	75.0	
44	4	Virág Vörös	Hungary	80.5	73.3	
45	8	Logan Sankey	United States	79.0	73.2	
46	15	Nina Lussi	United States	78.0	72.4	
47	26	Julia Kykkänen	Finland	79.0	71.1	
48	11	Andreea Diana Trâmbițaș	Romania	70.5	54.6	
49	1	Astrid Moberg	Sweden	67.0	42.1	
50	3	Alina Tukhtaeva	Kazakhstan	66.0	39.1	
51	7	Dayana Pekha	Kazakhstan	65.5	38.0	
52	13	Viktória Šidlová	Slovakia	59.5	28.1	
–	10	Tara Geraghty-Moats	United States	Disqualified		

=== Final ===
The first round was started at 16:15 and the final round at 17:09.

Rank	Bib	Name	Country	Round 1			Final round			Total
Rank	Bib	Name	Country	Distance (m)	Points	Rank	Distance (m)	Points	Rank	Points
1st place, gold medalist(s)	53	Maren Lundby	Norway	106.5	130.5	1	104.5	129.1	3	259.6
2nd place, silver medalist(s)	52	Katharina Althaus	Germany	108.0	128.9	2	107.0	130.2	1	259.1
3rd place, bronze medalist(s)	45	Daniela Iraschko-Stolz	Austria	101.0	117.8	8	105.5	129.8	2	247.6
4	50	Juliane Seyfarth	Germany	104.0	125.9	3	101.5	118.5	7	244.4
5	47	Eva Pinkelnig	Austria	102.0	120.3	4	103.0	121.5	4	241.8
6	51	Sara Takanashi	Japan	101.5	118.0	6	102.0	118.7	6	236.7
7	48	Nika Križnar	Slovenia	101.5	116.7	9	102.5	119.4	5	236.1
8	43	Urša Bogataj	Slovenia	102.0	119.7	5	99.0	112.0	13	231.7
9	46	Anna Odine Strøm	Norway	102.0	117.9	7	99.5	112.7	10	230.6
10	49	Carina Vogt	Germany	100.5	115.1	10	98.5	109.2	15	224.3
11	36	Silje Opseth	Norway	97.0	109.6	13	98.5	113.6	8	223.2
12	24	Anna Shpyneva	Russia	97.0	111.4	11	97.5	110.0	14	221.4
13	25	Daniela Haralambie	Romania	95.5	108.2	14	99.0	112.4	11	220.6
14	37	Lara Malsiner	Italy	96.5	106.6	16	100.0	113.3	9	219.9
15	40	Yuki Ito	Japan	97.0	109.9	12	94.5	106.7	18	216.6
16	34	Jacqueline Seifriedsberger	Austria	95.0	107.2	15	94.5	105.1	21	212.3
17	33	Nozomi Maruyama	Japan	95.0	105.2	18	97.0	106.3	20	211.5
18	42	Ramona Straub	Germany	92.5	97.6	28	101.0	112.3	12	209.9
18	29	Jerneja Brecl	Slovenia	94.0	102.2	24	98.5	107.7	17	209.9
20	39	Sofia Tikhonova	Russia	95.5	102.9	22	95.5	106.7	18	209.6
21	44	Lidiya Iakovleva	Russia	95.0	100.5	26	98.0	108.2	16	208.7
22	32	Špela Rogelj	Slovenia	95.0	105.5	17	93.5	100.5	25	206.0
23	18	Kamila Karpiel	Poland	97.5	103.6	21	93.5	102.1	22	205.7
24	35	Anna Rupprecht	Germany	93.0	101.4	25	96.0	102.1	22	203.5
25	20	Ingebjørg Saglien Bråten	Norway	96.0	105.1	19	94.0	97.3	26	202.4
26	41	Chiara Hölzl	Austria	93.0	100.1	27	95.0	101.5	24	201.6
27	30	Elena Runggaldier	Italy	93.5	103.8	20	90.5	92.0	29	195.8
28	31	Yūka Setō	Japan	94.0	102.7	23	89.0	91.5	30	194.2
29	12	Štěpánka Ptáčková	Czech Republic	88.5	94.3	30	91.5	96.7	27	191.0
30	28	Léa Lemare	France	90.5	94.9	29	89.5	93.7	28	188.6
31	23	Joséphine Pagnier	France	87.5	94.2	31	Did not qualify			
31	16	Karolína Indráčková	Czech Republic	89.5	94.2	31	Did not qualify			
33	27	Lucile Morat	France	88.0	91.5	33	Did not qualify			
34	19	Kinga Rajda	Poland	91.0	90.8	34	Did not qualify			
35	38	Alexandra Kustova	Russia	87.5	87.8	35	Did not qualify			
35	5	Veronika Shishkina	Kazakhstan	86.5	87.8	35	Did not qualify			
37	22	Nita Englund	United States	83.5	84.2	37	Did not qualify			
38	21	Océane Avocat Gros	France	84.5	83.8	38	Did not qualify			
39	17	Natalie Eilers	Canada	86.0	83.2	39	Did not qualify			
40	9	Susanna Forsström	Finland	84.0	79.8	40	Did not qualify			
