= Anna Shpyneva =

Russian ski jumper (born 2002)

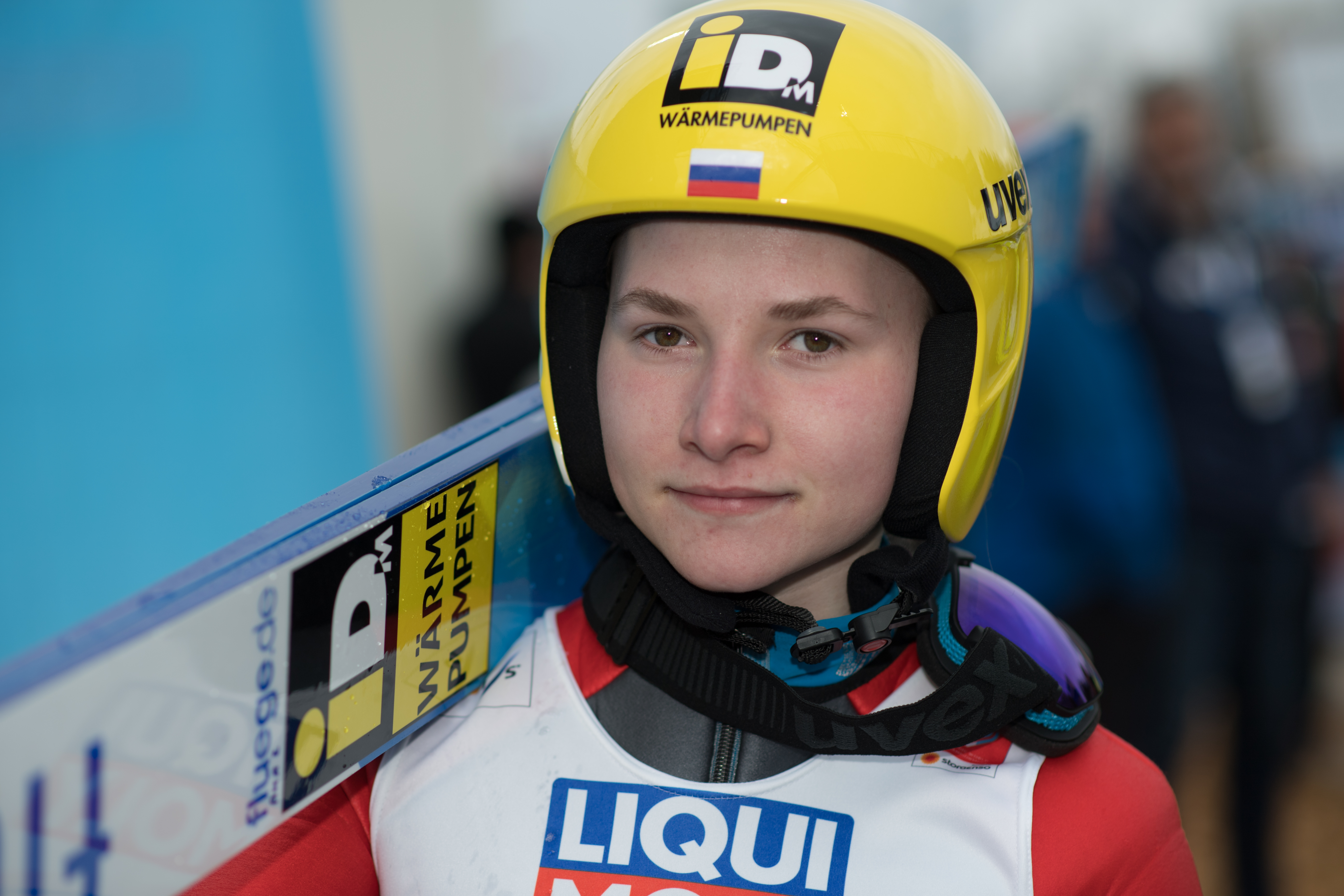
- Shpyneva 2019 in Seefeld

Personal information
- Full name: Anna Aleksandrovna Shpyneva
- Nationality: Russia
- Born: 3 January 2002 (age 24) Saint Petersburg, Russia

Sport
- Sport: Skiing
- Club: Dynamo Sankt Petersburg

World Cup career
- Seasons: 2019, 2020
- Indiv. starts: 14
- Team starts: 1
Medal record
Winter Youth Olympics
Gold medal – first place	2020 Lausanne	Individual
Junior World Championships
Gold medal – first place	2019 Lahti	Individual NH
Gold medal – first place	2019 Lahti	Team NH
Gold medal – first place	2019 Lahti	Mixed NH
Silver medal – second place	2021 Lahti	Team NH
- Updated on 20 January 2020

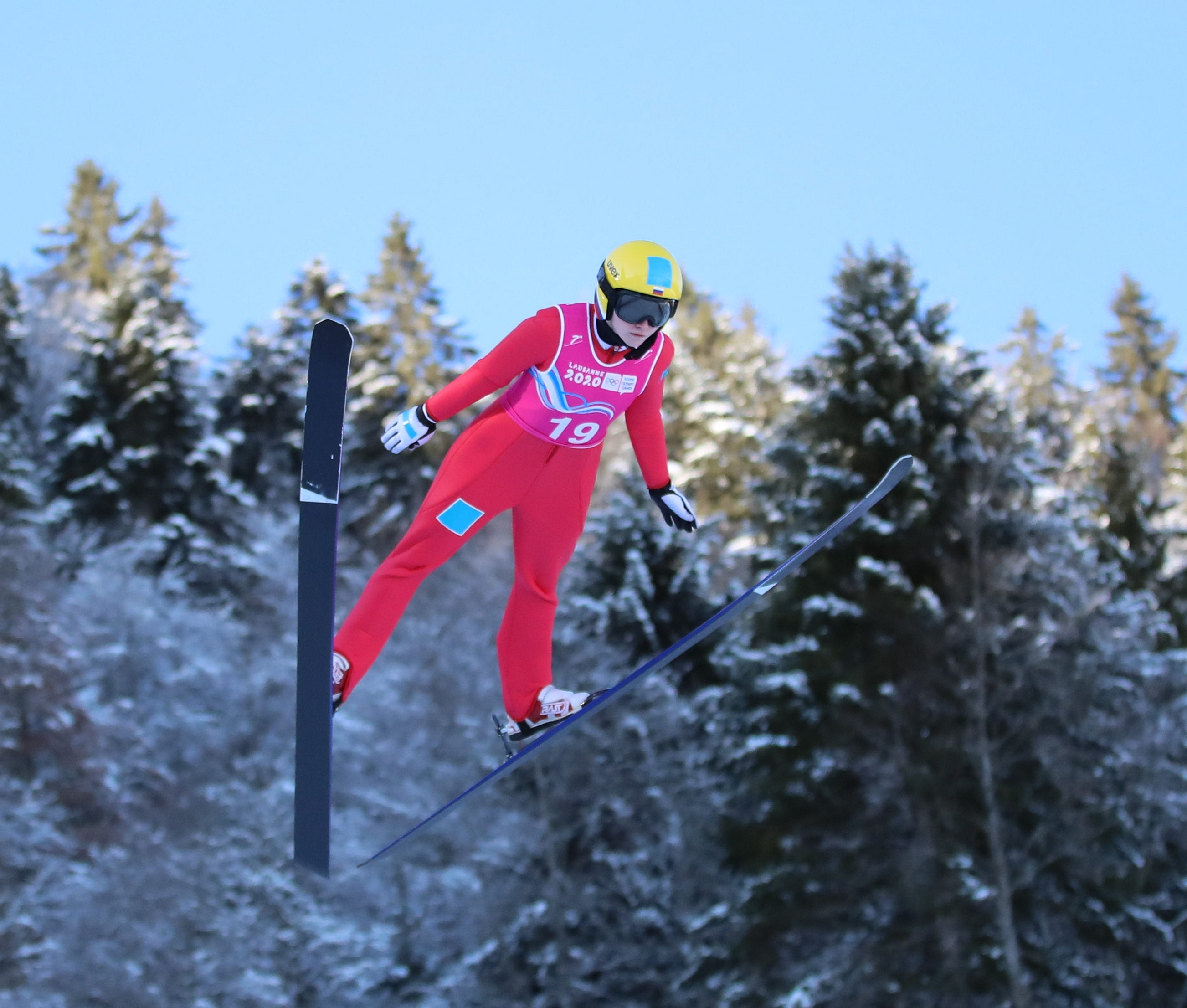
Anna Shpyneva at the 2020 Winter Youth Olympics

Anna Aleksandrovna Shpyneva (Russian: Анна Александровна Шпынёва; born 3 January 2002) is a Russian ski jumper.

== Career ==
She has competed at World Cup level since the 2018/19 season, with her best individual result being 10th place in Nizhny Tagil on 16 March 2019. She won three gold medals at the 2019 Nordic Junior World Ski Championships in Lahti.

On 2 March 2019 she took part in the mixed team, alongside Dmitriy Vassiliev, Evgeni Klimov and Sofia Tikhonova, at the 2019 World Championships, where they took 7th place at the end.

== World Championship results ==
Year	Normal hill	Large hill	Team NH	Mixed team NH
2019	12	—N/a	5	7
2021	—	26	—	—

== World Cup ==
=== Individual starts (11) ===
winner (1); second (2); third (3); did not compete (–); disqualified (DQ)
Season	1	2	3	4	5	6	7	8	9	10	11	12	13	14	15	16	17	18	19	20	21	22	23	24	Points
2018/19	Lillehammer	Lillehammer	Lillehammer	Prémanon	Prémanon	Sapporo	Sapporo	Zaō Onsen	Zaō Onsen	Râșnov	Râșnov	Hinzenbach	Hinzenbach	Ljubno ob Savinji	Ljubno ob Savinji	Oberstdorf	Oberstdorf	Oslo	Lillehammer	Trondheim	Nizhny Tagil	Nizhny Tagil	Chaykovsky, Perm Krai	Chaykovsky, Perm Krai	88
2018/19	36	37	32	–	–	–	–	–	–	–	–	–	–	17	24	15	38	–	–	–	10	19	27	22	88
2019/20	Lillehammer	Lillehammer	Klingenthal	Sapporo	Sapporo	Zaō Onsen	Zaō Onsen	Râșnov	Râșnov	Oberstdorf	Oberstdorf	Hinzenbach	Hinzenbach	Ljubno ob Savinji	Oslo	Oslo	Lillehammer	Lillehammer	Trondheim	Trondheim	Nizhny Tagil	Nizhny Tagil	Chaykovsky, Perm Krai	Chaykovsky, Perm Krai	33
2019/20	39	27	9	–	–	–	–																		33
