= Silje Opseth =

Norwegian ski jumper (born 1999)

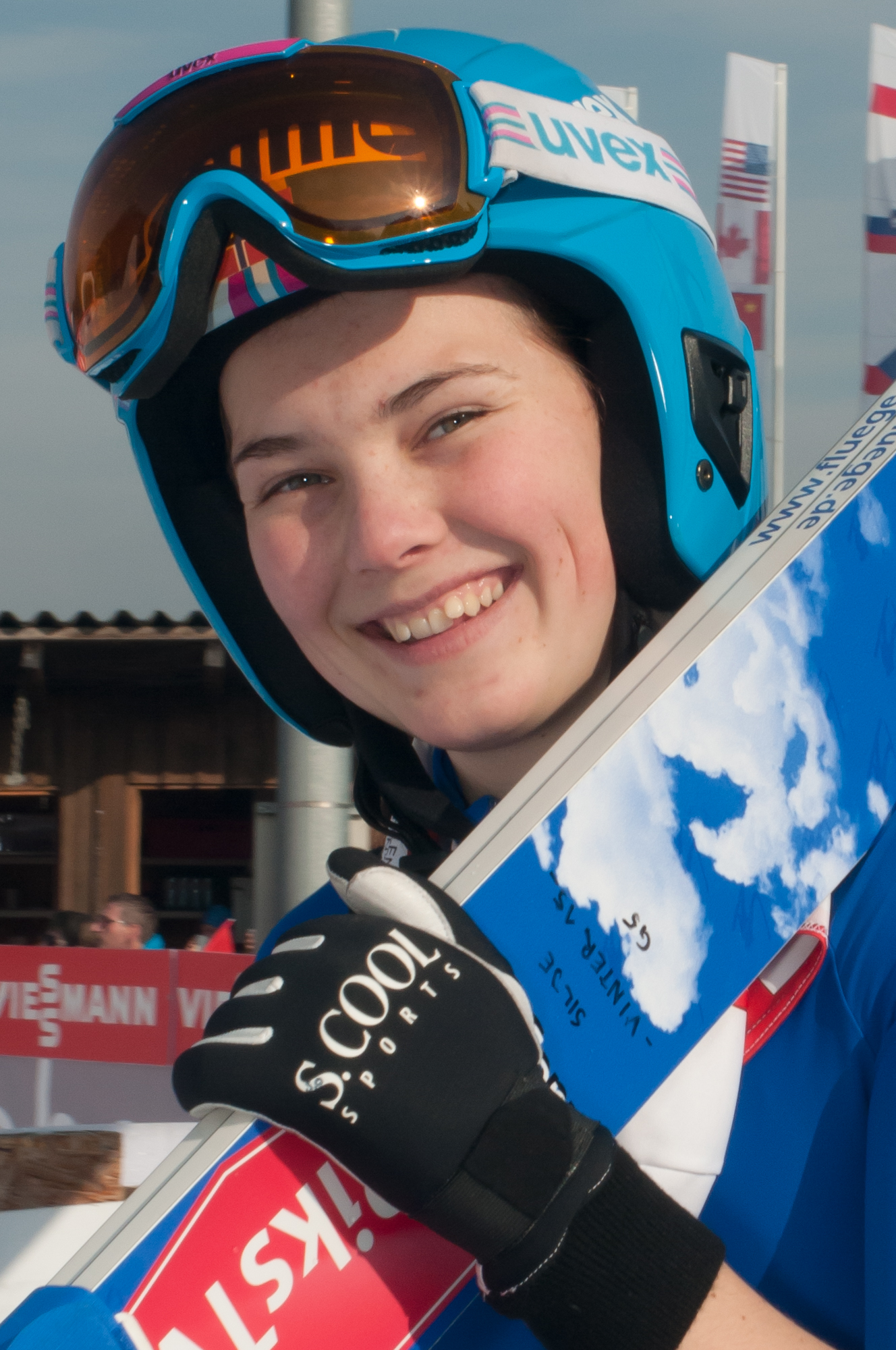
- Opseth in 2015

Personal information
- Nationality: Norway
- Born: 28 April 1999 (age 27) Hønefoss, Norway
- Height: 1.70 m (5 ft 7 in)

Sport
- Sport: Skiing
- Club: IL Holeværingen

World Cup career
- Seasons: 2016–present
- Indiv. starts: 143
- Indiv. podiums: 29
- Indiv. wins: 7
- Team wins: 2

Achievements and titles
- Personal bests: 230.5 m (756 ft); Vikersund, 17 March 2024
Medal record
World Championships
Silver medal – second place	2021 Oberstdorf	Mixed team NH
Bronze medal – third place	2019 Seefeld	Team NH
Bronze medal – third place	2021 Oberstdorf	Team NH
- Updated on 12 June 2025

Silje Opseth (born 28 April 1999 in Hønefoss) is a Norwegian ski jumper, who represents the club Holeværingen IL.

== Career ==
Besides ski jumping, Opseth was a Nordic combined skier in her youth and was one of the female pioneers of this sport in Norway.

She made her World Cup debut in ski jumping in 2015, at 16 years old.

She competed at the FIS Nordic World Ski Championships 2017 in Lahti, Finland. Competing at the 2018 Winter Olympics, she placed 16th in the women's normal hill individual.

She won her first World Cup victory in Holmenkollen in March 2022.

After Opseth's victory in Willingen in 2024, Sarah Hendrickson named her as an example for the use of irregular jumping suits and demanded her disqualification.

Opseth reached a world record distance of 236.5m in training on the Vikersundbakken at March 17 in 2024, but fell while landing. At the following competition she jumped 230.5m, which was a world record for almost a year. Since January 30, 2021, she has also been the female hill record holder on the Hochfirst Ski Jump, with a distance of 138.5m.

In late January 2025 Opseth suffered a knee injury and could not continue the World Cup season.

She is a multiple national champion in ski jumping.

== Engagement and awards ==
In 2016 Opseth and Leif Torbjørn Næsvold received the Jubilee Trophy of the Norwegian Ski Federation for Fair Play and engagement.

In 2022 she and Maren Lundby criticized the Polish Ski Federation for their internal rule to give financial support only to female ski jumpers with a BMI of 21 or under.

Opseth is an ambassador for the anti-alcohol campaign Idrett uten alkohol ("sport instead of alcohol"). In 2023 she criticized the consumption of alcohol at the Holmenkollen Ski Festival.

In 2023 Opseth gave an interview about the influence of the menstruation on physical effectivity and about writing an menstruation diary. She was supported by Hanne Staff, who is involved in the scientific project FENDURA on this topic.

After her knee injury in 2025, Opseth talked in an interview about the pressure to have a low body weight in ski jumping. She was supported by Katharina Schmid, Eva Pinkelnig und Jacqueline Seifriedsberger shortly after.

== World Cup ==
=== Standings ===
Season	Overall	ST	AK	L3	RA	BB
2015/16	40	N/A	N/A	N/A	N/A	N/A
2016/17	51	N/A	N/A	N/A	N/A	N/A
2017/18	20	N/A	N/A	19	N/A	N/A
2018/19	16	N/A	N/A	21	11	12
2019/20	10	N/A	N/A	N/A	2nd place, silver medalist(s)	N/A
2020/21	4	N/A	N/A	N/A	N/A	4
2021/22	6	12	6	N/A	6	N/A
2022/23	7	24	N/A	N/A	4	N/A
2023/24	11	N/A	N/A	N/A	7	N/A
2024/25	43	N/A	N/A	N/A	N/A	N/A

=== Individual wins ===
No.	Season	Date	Location	Hill	Size
1	2021/22	5 March 2022	(Norway) Oslo	Holmenkollbakken HS134	LH
2	2022/23	5 November 2022	(Poland) Wisla	Malinka HS134	LH
3	2022/23	4 December 2022	(Norway) Lillehammer	Lysgårdsbakken HS140	LH
4	2022/23	8 January 2023	(Japan) Sapporo	Ōkurayama HS137	LH
5	2022/23	13 March 2023	(Norway) Lillehammer	Lysgårdsbakken HS140	LH
6	2023/24	4 February 2024	(Germany) Willingen	Mühlenkopfschanze HS147	LH
7	2023/24	9 March 2024	(Norway) Oslo	Holmenkollbakken HS134	LH
