= Anna Hollandt =

German ski jumper (born 1996)

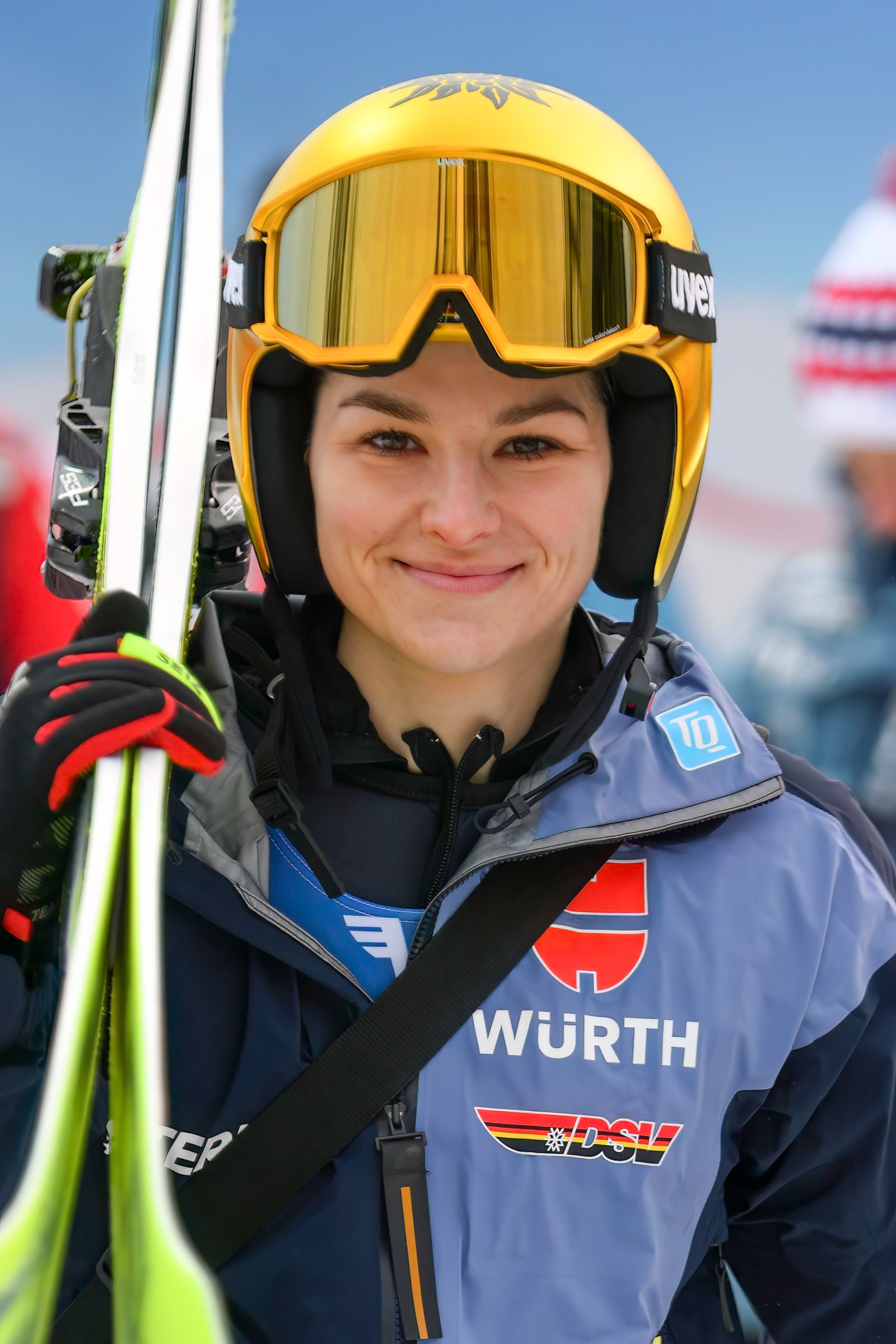
- Rupprecht in 2023

Personal information
- Nationality: Germany
- Born: 29 December 1996 (age 29)
- Height: 1.68 m (5 ft 6 in)

Sport
- Sport: Skiing
- Club: SC Degenfeld

World Cup career
- Seasons: 2012–present
- Indiv. starts: 104
- Indiv. podiums: 1
- Team starts: 6
- Team podiums: 1
- Team wins: 1

Achievements and titles
- Personal bests: 173 m (568 ft); Vikersund, 19 March 2023
Medal record
Women's ski jumping
Representing Germany
World Championships
Gold medal – first place	2021 Oberstdorf	Mixed team NH
Gold medal – first place	2023 Planica	Team NH
- Updated on 25 February 2023

Anna Hollandt (née Rupprecht, born 29 December 1996) is a German ski jumper. She made her Continental Cup debut in the 2008/09 season, and her World Cup debut in the 2011/12 season. Her best individual result is a third place in Lillehammer on 2 December 2016, but her season was cut short after suffering an ACL injury in Nizhny Tagil, on 11 December.

== World Championship results ==
Year	Normal hill	Large hill	Team NH	Mixed team
2019	24	—N/a	—	—
2021	14	15	5	1
2023	9	DNQ	1	–
