= FIS Nordic World Ski Championships 2021 – Mixed team normal hill =

Mixed team normal hill at the FIS Nordic World Ski Championships 2021
- Location: Oberstdorf, Germany
- Date: 28 February
- Competitors: 48 from 12 nations
- Teams: 12
- Winning points: 1000.8

Medalists
gold medal	Katharina Althaus; Markus Eisenbichler; Anna Rupprecht; Karl Geiger	Germany
silver medal	Silje Opseth; Robert Johansson; Maren Lundby; Halvor Egner Granerud	Norway
bronze medal	Marita Kramer; Michael Hayböck; Daniela Iraschko-Stolz; Stefan Kraft	Austria

The Mixed team normal hill competition at the FIS Nordic World Ski Championships 2021 was held on 28 February 2021.

== Results ==
The first round was started at 17:00 and the final round at 18:10.

Rank	Bib	Country	Round 1			Final round			Total
Rank	Bib	Country	Distance (m)	Points	Rank	Distance (m)	Points	Rank	Points
1st place, gold medalist(s)	8	Germany; Katharina Althaus; Markus Eisenbichler; Anna Rupprecht; Karl Geiger	104.0; 100.0; 92.5; 99.5	472.8; 122.4; 121.3; 105.5; 123.6	1	99.5; 98.5; 98.5; 99.5	528.0; 133.1; 129.2; 130.8; 134.9	2	1000.8; 255.5; 250.5; 236.3; 258.5
2nd place, silver medalist(s)	12	Norway; Silje Opseth; Robert Johansson; Maren Lundby; Halvor Egner Granerud	103.0; 100.5; 98.0; 94.0	467.9; 118.9; 118.5; 116.6; 113.9	2	98.5; 96.0; 101.0; 102.0	527.7; 129.5; 125.4; 135.5; 137.3	3	995.6; 248.4; 243.9; 252.1; 251.2
3rd place, bronze medalist(s)	11	Austria; Marita Kramer; Michael Hayböck; Daniela Iraschko-Stolz; Stefan Kraft	105.5; 98.5; 95.5; 91.5	457.2; 124.3; 113.2; 112.2; 107.5	3	103.0; 94.5; 101.5; 101.5	529.3; 135.9; 120.7; 135.8; 136.9	1	986.5; 260.2; 233.9; 248.0; 244.4
4	10	Slovenia; Nika Križnar; Bor Pavlovčič; Ema Klinec; Anže Lanišek	102.5; 97.0; 90.5; 98.5	436.6; 114.8; 109.8; 89.6; 122.4	4	100.0; 94.5; 93.0; 104.5	518.2; 132.5; 123.2; 118.7; 143.8	4	954.8; 247.3; 233.0; 208.3; 266.2
5	7	Japan; Yuki Ito; Yukiya Satō; Sara Takanashi; Ryoyu Kobayashi	75.0; 102.5; 99.5; 96.0	423.2; 69.1; 120.1; 120.1; 113.9	5	92.0; 98.5; 102.0; 99.5	517.1; 113.8; 130.0; 139.2; 134.1	5	940.3; 182.9; 250.1; 259.3; 248.0
6	9	Poland; Anna Twardosz; Piotr Żyła; Kamila Karpiel; Dawid Kubacki	85.0; 100.0; 78.0; 97.0	382.2; 78.5; 116.7; 68.0; 119.0	6	85.0; 93.0; 82.0; 103.0	455.4; 101.5; 120.1; 92.9; 140.9	6	837.6; 180.0; 236.8; 160.9; 259.9
7	6	Russian Ski Federation; Irina Avvakumova; Danil Sadreev; Irma Makhinia; Evgeniy Klimov	84.5; 89.5; 84.0; 92.0	365.7; 86.4; 95.2; 82.0; 102.1	7	86.0; 95.5; 91.5; 89.0	439.7; 101.2; 119.6; 110.9; 108.0	7	805.4; 187.6; 214.8; 192.9; 210.1
8	3	Czech Republic; Karolína Indráčková; Viktor Polášek; Klára Ulrichová; Čestmír Kožíšek	84.0; 87.5; 87.0; 84.5	344.5; 79.8; 92.4; 88.5; 83.8	8	84.0; 92.5; 90.0; 91.0	432.7; 96.3; 114.5; 108.5; 113.4	8	777.2; 176.1; 206.9; 197.0; 192.2
9	5	Finland; Jenny Rautionaho; Eetu Nousiainen; Julia Kykkänen; Niko Kytösaho	79.5; 76.5; 90.5; 90.0	332.0; 69.9; 65.3; 98.7; 98.1	9	did not advance			
10	4	Canada; Abigail Strate; Matthew Soukup; Alexandria Loutitt; Mackenzie Boyd-Clowes	78.0; 83.0; 74.5; 91.5	298.9; 67.4; 71.0; 59.8; 100.7	10	did not advance			
11	2	Romania; Andreea Trâmbițaș; Nicolae Mitrofan; Daniela Haralambie; Daniel Cacina	66.0; 77.5; 84.0; 86.0	265.6; 38.4; 64.0; 77.3; 85.9	11	did not advance			
12	1	United States; Paige Jones; Casey Larson; Annika Belshaw; Decker Dean	67.5; 79.0; 70.5; 90.0	258.6; 48.2; 67.2; 48.0; 95.2	12	did not advance			
