= FIS Nordic World Ski Championships 2019 – Women's team normal hill =

Women's team normal hill at the FIS Nordic World Ski Championships 2019
- Location: Seefeld in Tirol, Austria
- Dates: 26 February
- Competitors: 44 from 11 nations
- Teams: 11
- Winning points: 898.9

Medalists
gold medal	Juliane Seyfarth; Ramona Straub; Carina Vogt; Katharina Althaus	Germany
silver medal	Eva Pinkelnig; Jacqueline Seifriedsberger; Chiara Hölzl; Daniela Iraschko-Stolz	Austria
bronze medal	Anna Odine Strøm; Ingebjørg Saglien Bråten; Silje Opseth; Maren Lundby	Norway

The Women's team normal hill competition at the FIS Nordic World Ski Championships 2019 was held on 26 February 2019.

== Results ==
The first round was started at 16:15 and the final round at 17:20.

Rank	Bib	Country	Round 1			Final round			Total
Rank	Bib	Country	Distance (m)	Points	Rank	Distance (m)	Points	Rank	Points
1st place, gold medalist(s)	11	Germany; Juliane Seyfarth; Ramona Straub; Carina Vogt; Katharina Althaus	98.0; 106.0; 99.0; 104.5	477.1; 107.7; 128.1; 111.4; 129.9	1	95.0; 100.0; 92.5; 99.5	421.8; 105.3; 116.1; 91.9; 108.5	1	898.9
2nd place, silver medalist(s)	9	Austria; Eva Pinkelnig; Jacqueline Seifriedsberger; Chiara Hölzl; Daniela Iraschko-Stolz	99.5; 92.5; 99.0; 104.5	459.9; 116.2; 98.9; 114.2; 130.6	3	99.5; 96.0; 96.5; 96.5	420.4; 112.4; 106.9; 102.4; 98.7	2	880.3
3rd place, bronze medalist(s)	10	Norway; Anna Odine Strøm; Ingebjørg Saglien Bråten; Silje Opseth; Maren Lundby	97.5; 96.0; 97.5; 108.0	466.9; 114.5; 99.7; 116.8; 135.9	2	97.0; 90.0; 94.5; 100.5	410.0; 108.6; 91.0; 103.3; 107.1	3	876.9
4	7	Slovenia; Špela Rogelj; Jerneja Brecl; Nika Križnar; Urša Bogataj	89.0; 96.5; 95.5; 101.0	431.3; 99.1; 101.4; 109.5; 121.3	4	97.5; 94.0; 91.0; 99.5	396.8; 99.4; 96.1; 94.4; 106.9	5	828.1
5	6	Russia; Anna Shpyneva; Alexandra Kustova; Lidiya Iakovleva; Sofia Tikhonova	87.5; 93.0; 97.0; 104.0	420.8; 95.9; 97.9; 104.9; 122.1	5	102.5; 92.5; 91.0; 98.5	399.5; 109.8; 94.0; 93.9; 101.8	4	820.3
6	8	Japan; Yūki Itō; Kaori Iwabuchi; Nozomi Maruyama; Sara Takanashi	92.0; 88.0; 96.0; 101.0	418.6; 103.9; 87.5; 108.4; 118.8	6	104.5; 88.0; 92.5; 93.5	387.5; 117.4; 83.0; 94.4; 92.7	6	806.1
7	4	France; Léa Lemare; Joséphine Pagnier; Océane Avocat Gros; Lucile Morat	88.0; 91.5; 87.5; 96.5	372.4; 88.4; 99.7; 84.6; 99.7	7	90.5; 95.5; 85.0; 88.0	345.7; 86.6; 99.7; 78.8; 80.6	7	718.1
8	5	Italy; Elena Runggaldier; Veronica Gianmoena; Giada Tomaselli; Lara Malsiner	93.5; 87.0; 78.5; 97.5	358.4; 98.9; 82.9; 67.2; 109.4	8	97.5; 81.0; 76.0; 100.0	332.1; 100.6; 72.1; 57.6; 101.8	8	690.5
9	2	Czech Republic; Marta Křepelková; Štěpánka Ptáčková; Karolína Indráčková; Zdeňka Pešatová	75.0; 83.5; 87.0; 90.5	326.6; 68.9; 84.7; 86.0; 87.0	9	did not advance			
10	3	United States; Logan Sankey; Nina Lussi; Tara Geraghty-Moats; Nita Englund	72.0; 75.5; 78.5; 93.0	291.6; 61.2; 67.4; 66.4; 96.6	10	did not advance			
11	1	Kazakhstan; Valentina Sderzhikova; Dayana Pekha; Veronika Shishkina; Alina Tukhtaeva	70.5; 63.5; 80.5; 65.0	207.8; 59.8; 39.1; 76.5; 87.0	11	did not advance			
