= 2019–20 FIS Ski Jumping World Cup =

Ski jumping championship season

2019–20 World Cup
Discipline	Men	Women
Overall	(Austria) Stefan Kraft	(Norway) Maren Lundby
Nations Cup	Germany	Austria
Ski flying	(Austria) Stefan Kraft	—

Stage events
Four Hills Tournament	(Poland) Dawid Kubacki	—
Titisee-Neustadt Five	(Japan) Ryōyū Kobayashi	—
Willingen Five	(Germany) Stephan Leyhe	—
Raw Air	(Poland) Kamil Stoch	(Norway) Maren Lundby
Russia Tour Blue Bird	—	—

Competition
Edition	41st	9th
Locations	19	10
Individual	28	16
Team	5	2
Cancelled	3 Ind. + 1 Team	5
Rescheduled	2	1

The 2019–20 FIS Ski Jumping World Cup was the 41st World Cup season in ski jumping for men, the 23rd official World Cup season in ski flying, and the 9th World Cup season for women. Before season, FIS changed name from Ladies to Women's World Cup.

Season began on 24 November 2019 in Wisła, Poland and ended on 10 March 2020 in Trondheim, Norway. Women's World Cup began on 7 December 2019 in Lillehammer, Norway and ended on 10 March 2020 in Trondheim, Norway. Both ended earlier than expected due to the COVID-19 pandemic.

In March 2020, just before the end of the season, COVID-19 cases were widely declared all across Europe. As a result, the Raw Air Tournament for men (Trondheim (1x)) and Vikersund (2x)) and the Russia Tour Blue Bird Tournament (Nizhny Tagil (2x) and Chaykovsky (2x)) for women were all fully cancelled without a single jump.

The FIS Ski Flying World Championships 2020 scheduled for 19–22 March 2020 in Planica was also cancelled due to the COVID-19 pandemic. The competition was rescheduled to the next season in December (first and only time in history that ski flying was held that month).

== Map of World Cup hosts ==
Europe
Germany	Austria	Asia

== Men's Individual ==
Individual events in the World Cup history

Total	FH	LH	NH	Winners
1002	127	717	158	164

including LH event in Lillehammer (10 March 2020)

=== Calendar ===
N – normal hill / L – large hill / F – flying hill
All	No.	Date	Place (Hill)	Size	Winner	Second	Third	Overall leader	R.
976	1	24 November 2019	(Poland) Wisła (Malinka HS134)	L _{697}	(Norway) Daniel-André Tande	(Slovenia) Anže Lanišek	(Poland) Kamil Stoch	(Norway) Daniel-André Tande	
977	2	30 November 2019	(Finland) Ruka (Rukatunturi HS142)	L _{698}	(Norway) Daniel-André Tande	(Austria) Philipp Aschenwald	(Slovenia) Anže Lanišek	(Norway) Daniel-André Tande	
		1 December 2019	(Finland) Ruka (Rukatunturi HS142)	L _{cnx}	cancelled due to strong wind conditions (rescheduled to Lahti on 28 February)			—	
978	3	7 December 2019	(Russia) Nizhny Tagil (Tramplin Stork HS134)	L _{699}	(Japan) Yukiya Satō	(Germany) Karl Geiger	(Austria) Philipp Aschenwald	(Norway) Daniel-André Tande	
979	4	8 December 2019	(Russia) Nizhny Tagil (Tramplin Stork HS134)	L _{700}	(Austria) Stefan Kraft	(Switzerland) Killian Peier	(Japan) Ryōyū Kobayashi	(Norway) Daniel-André Tande	
980	5	15 December 2019	(Germany) Klingenthal (Vogtland Arena HS140)	L _{701}	(Japan) Ryōyū Kobayashi	(Austria) Stefan Kraft	(Norway) Marius Lindvik	(Japan) Ryōyū Kobayashi	
981	6	21 December 2019	(Switzerland) Engelberg (Gross-Titlis HS140)	L _{702}	(Poland) Kamil Stoch	(Austria) Stefan Kraft	(Germany) Karl Geiger	(Austria) Stefan Kraft	
982	7	22 December 2019	(Switzerland) Engelberg (Gross-Titlis HS140)	L _{703}	(Japan) Ryōyū Kobayashi	(Slovenia) Peter Prevc	(Austria) Jan Hörl	(Japan) Ryōyū Kobayashi	
983	8	29 December 2019	(Germany) Oberstdorf (Schattenberg HS137)	L _{704}	(Japan) Ryōyū Kobayashi	(Germany) Karl Geiger	(Poland) Dawid Kubacki	(Japan) Ryōyū Kobayashi	
984	9	1 January 2020	(Germany) Garmisch-Pa (Gr. Olympiaschanze HS142)	L _{705}	(Norway) Marius Lindvik	(Germany) Karl Geiger	(Poland) Dawid Kubacki	(Japan) Ryōyū Kobayashi	
985	10	4 January 2020	(Austria) Innsbruck (Bergiselschanze HS130)	L _{706}	(Norway) Marius Lindvik	(Poland) Dawid Kubacki	(Norway) Daniel-André Tande	(Japan) Ryōyū Kobayashi	
986	11	6 January 2020	(Austria) Bischofshofen (Paul-Ausserleitner HS142)	L _{707}	(Poland) Dawid Kubacki	(Germany) Karl Geiger	(Norway) Marius Lindvik	(Japan) Ryōyū Kobayashi	
68th Four Hills Tournament Overall (29 December 2019 – 6 January 2020)					(Poland) Dawid Kubacki	(Norway) Marius Lindvik	(Germany) Karl Geiger	4H Tournament	
987	12	(Note: Large hill event in Val di Fiemme (11 January 2020) was moved to normal hill HS104 due to technical reasons (avalanche on large hill).)11 January 2020	(Italy) Val di Fiemme (Trampolino dal Ben HS104)	N _{155}	(Germany) Karl Geiger	(Austria) Stefan Kraft	(Poland) Dawid Kubacki	(Germany) Karl Geiger	
988	13	(Note: Large hill event in Val di Fiemme (12 January 2020) was moved to normal hill HS104 due to technical reasons (avalanche on large hill).)12 January 2020	(Italy) Val di Fiemme (Trampolino dal Ben HS104)	N _{156}	(Germany) Karl Geiger	(Austria) Stefan Kraft	(Poland) Dawid Kubacki	(Germany) Karl Geiger	
qualifying		17 January 2020	(Germany) Titisee-Neustadt (Hochfirstschanze HS142)	L _{Qro}	(Japan) Ryōyū Kobayashi	(Germany) Stephan Leyhe	(Norway) Robert Johansson	—	
989	14	18 January 2020	(Germany) Titisee-Neustadt (Hochfirstschanze HS142)	L _{708}	(Poland) Dawid Kubacki	(Austria) Stefan Kraft	(Japan) Ryōyū Kobayashi	(Germany) Karl Geiger	
990	15	19 January 2020	(Germany) Titisee-Neustadt (Hochfirstschanze HS142)	L _{709}	(Poland) Dawid Kubacki	(Japan) Ryōyū Kobayashi	(Slovenia) Timi Zajc	(Germany) Karl Geiger	
1st Titisee-Neustadt Five Overall (17 – 19 January 2020)					(Japan) Ryōyū Kobayashi	(Poland) Dawid Kubacki	(Germany) Stephan Leyhe	Titisee-Neustadt Five	
991	16	26 January 2020	(Poland) Zakopane (Wielka Krokiew HS140)	L _{710}	(Poland) Kamil Stoch	(Austria) Stefan Kraft	(Poland) Dawid Kubacki	(Germany) Karl Geiger	
992	17	1 February 2020	(Japan) Sapporo (Ōkurayama HS137)	L _{711}	(Japan) Yukiya Satō	(Austria) Stefan Kraft	(Poland) Dawid Kubacki	(Austria) Stefan Kraft	
993	18	2 February 2020	(Japan) Sapporo (Ōkurayama HS137)	L _{712}	(Austria) Stefan Kraft	(Germany) Stephan Leyhe	(Japan) Ryōyū Kobayashi	(Austria) Stefan Kraft	
qualifying		7 February 2020	(Germany) Willingen (Mühlenkopfschanze HS145)	L _{Qro}	cancelled due to weather conditions and rescheduled to 8 January			—	
qualifying		8 February 2020	(Germany) Willingen (Mühlenkopfschanze HS145)	L _{Qro}	(Germany) Stephan Leyhe	(Austria) Stefan Kraft	(Slovenia) Timi Zajc	—	
994	19	8 February 2020	(Germany) Willingen (Mühlenkopfschanze HS145)	L _{713}	(Germany) Stephan Leyhe	(Norway) Marius Lindvik	(Poland) Kamil Stoch	(Austria) Stefan Kraft	
		9 February 2020	(Germany) Willingen (Mühlenkopfschanze HS145)	L _{cnx}	cancelled due to extreme weather forecast			—	
3rd Willingen Five Overall (8 February 2020)					(Germany) Stephan Leyhe	(Austria) Stefan Kraft	(Norway) Marius Lindvik	Willingen Five	
995	20	15 February 2020	(Austria) Bad Mitterndorf (Kulm HS235)	F _{126}	(Poland) Piotr Żyła	(Slovenia) Timi Zajc	(Austria) Stefan Kraft	(Austria) Stefan Kraft	
996	21	(Note: 2nd round of ski flying event in Bad Mitterndorf (16 February) cancelled after 27 jumpers due to strong wind. First round counted as official.)16 February 2020	(Austria) Bad Mitterndorf (Kulm HS235)	F _{127}	(Austria) Stefan Kraft	(Japan) Ryōyū Kobayashi	(Slovenia) Timi Zajc	(Austria) Stefan Kraft	
997	22	21 February 2020	(Romania) Râșnov (Trambulina Valea HS97)	N _{157}	(Germany) Karl Geiger	(Germany) Stephan Leyhe	(Austria) Stefan Kraft	(Austria) Stefan Kraft	
998	23	22 February 2020	(Romania) Râșnov (Trambulina Valea HS97)	N _{158}	(Austria) Stefan Kraft	(Germany) Karl Geiger	(Germany) Constantin Schmid	(Austria) Stefan Kraft	
999	24	(Note: Canceled large hill event from Ruka (1 December) was replaced in Lahti (28 February).)28 February 2020	(Finland) Lahti (Salpausselkä HS130)	L _{714}	(Austria) Stefan Kraft	(Germany) Karl Geiger	(Norway) Daniel-André Tande	(Austria) Stefan Kraft	
1000	25	1 March 2020	(Finland) Lahti (Salpausselkä HS130)	L _{715}	(Germany) Karl Geiger	(Austria) Stefan Kraft	(Austria) Michael Hayböck	(Austria) Stefan Kraft	
prologue		6 March 2020	(Norway) Oslo (Holmenkollbakken HS134)	L _{Qro}	(Germany) Constantin Schmid	(Austria) Michael Hayböck	(Slovenia) Žiga Jelar	—	
team		7 March 2020	(Norway) Oslo (Holmenkollbakken HS134)	L _{T}	(Norway) J. André Forfang	(Poland) Kamil Stoch	(Norway) Marius Lindvik	—	
		8 March 2020	(Norway) Oslo (Holmenkollbakken HS134)	L _{cnx}	cancelled due to strong wind and water on hill (rescheduled to Lillehammer on 9 March)			—	
1001	26	(Note: Cancelled individual men's event in Oslo (8 March 2020) was rescheduled to Lillehammer (9 March 2020).)9 March 2020	(Norway) Lillehammer (Lysgårdsbakken HS140)	L _{716}	(Slovenia) Peter Prevc	(Germany) Markus Eisenbichler	(Germany) Stephan Leyhe	(Austria) Stefan Kraft	
prologue		9 March 2020	(Norway) Lillehammer (Lysgårdsbakken HS140)	L _{Qro}	schedule switch with Oslo individual competition (prologue from Lillehammer was rescheduled on 10 March)			—	
prologue		(Note: Cancelled men's prologue in Lillehammer (9 March) was rescheduled to 10 March.)10 March 2020	(Norway) Lillehammer (Lysgårdsbakken HS140)	L _{Qro}	(Norway) Robin Pedersen	(Germany) Stephan Leyhe	(Norway) Robert Johansson	—	
1002	27	10 March 2020	(Norway) Lillehammer (Lysgårdsbakken HS140)	L _{717}	(Poland) Kamil Stoch	(Slovenia) Žiga Jelar	(Slovenia) Timi Zajc	(Austria) Stefan Kraft	
prologue		11 March 2020	(Norway) Trondheim (Granåsen HS138)	L _{Qro}	(Japan) Ryōyū Kobayashi	(Poland) Piotr Żyła	(Norway) J. André Forfang	—	
		12 March 2020	(Norway) Trondheim (Granåsen HS138)	L _{cnx}	cancelled due to the COVID-19 pandemic			—	
prologue		13 March 2020	(Norway) Vikersund (Vikersundbakken HS240)	F _{Qro}	cancelled due to the COVID-19 pandemic			—	
team		14 March 2020	(Norway) Vikersund (Vikersundbakken HS240)	F _{T}	cancelled due to the COVID-19 pandemic			—	
		15 March 2020	(Norway) Vikersund (Vikersundbakken HS240)	F _{cnx}	cancelled due to the COVID-19 pandemic			—	
4th Raw Air Men's Overall (6 – 11 March 2020)					(Poland) Kamil Stoch	(Japan) Ryōyū Kobayashi	(Norway) Marius Lindvik	Raw Air	
41st FIS World Cup Men's Overall (24 November 2019 – 10 March 2020)					(Austria) Stefan Kraft	(Germany) Karl Geiger	(Japan) Ryōyū Kobayashi	World Cup Overall	
FIS Ski Flying World Championships 2020 (planned from 20 – 21 March, but cancelled due to the COVID-19 pandemic; rescheduled to 11 – 12 December • (Slovenia) Planica)

=== Standings ===
==== Overall ====
Rank	after all 27 events	Points
1	(Austria) Stefan Kraft	1659
2	(Germany) Karl Geiger	1519
3	(Japan) Ryōyū Kobayashi	1178
4	(Poland) Dawid Kubacki	1169
5	(Poland) Kamil Stoch	1031
6	(Germany) Stephan Leyhe	917
7	(Norway) Marius Lindvik	906
8	(Slovenia) Peter Prevc	789
9	(Norway) Daniel-André Tande	721
10	(Austria) Philipp Aschenwald	622

==== Nations Cup ====
Rank	after all 32 events	Points
1	Germany	5194
2	Austria	5041
3	Norway	4622
4	Poland	4272
5	Slovenia	4085
6	Japan	3479
7	Switzerland	801
8	Czech Republic	335
9	Russia	248
10	Finland	243

==== Prize money ====
Rank	after all 35 payouts	CHF
1	(Austria) Stefan Kraft	199,400
2	(Germany) Karl Geiger	186,200
3	(Poland) Dawid Kubacki	160,700
4	(Japan) Ryōyū Kobayashi	160,100
5	(Germany) Stephan Leyhe	141,750
6	(Norway) Marius Lindvik	116,850
7	(Poland) Kamil Stoch	114,850
8	(Slovenia) Peter Prevc	93,200
9	(Norway) Daniel-André Tande	90,500
10	(Austria) Philipp Aschenwald	79,700

==== Ski flying ====
Rank	after all 2 events	Points
1	(Austria) Stefan Kraft	160
2	(Slovenia) Timi Zajc	140
3	(Poland) Piotr Żyła	129
4	(Japan) Ryōyū Kobayashi	109
5	(Germany) Karl Geiger	90
6	(Poland) Kamil Stoch	86
7	(Finland) Antti Aalto	64
	(Norway) Robert Johansson	64
9	(Norway) Johann Andre Forfang	51
	(Slovenia) Domen Prevc	51

==== Four Hills Tournament ====
Rank	after all 4 events	Points
1	(Poland) Dawid Kubacki	1131.6
2	(Norway) Marius Lindvik	1111.0
3	(Germany) Karl Geiger	1108.4
4	(Japan) Ryōyū Kobayashi	1096.0
5	(Austria) Stefan Kraft	1086.0
6	(Norway) Johann André Forfang	1051.0
7	(Slovenia) Domen Prevc	1050.9
8	(Slovenia) Peter Prevc	1048.8
9	(Japan) Daiki Itō	1039.0
10	(Germany) Stephan Leyhe	1037.5

==== Raw Air ====
Rank	after all 6 events	Points
1	(Poland) Kamil Stoch	1161.9
2	(Japan) Ryōyū Kobayashi	1154.5
3	(Norway) Marius Lindvik	1154.3
4	(Slovenia) Žiga Jelar	1151.9
5	(Germany) Stephan Leyhe	1149.0
6	(Norway) Robert Johansson	1140.6
7	(Slovenia) Peter Prevc	1133.8
8	(Austria) Stefan Kraft	1131.8
9	(Slovenia) Timi Zajc	1109.8
10	(Japan) Yukiya Satō	1098.6

==== Titisee Neustadt Five ====
Rank	after all 3 events	Points
1	(Japan) Ryōyū Kobayashi	709.9
2	(Poland) Dawid Kubacki	704.5
3	(Germany) Stephan Leyhe	686.4
4	(Austria) Stefan Kraft	676.3
5	(Germany) Karl Geiger	664.5
6	(Norway) Johann Andre Forfang	660.8
7	(Germany) Constantin Schmid	660.4
8	(Poland) Piotr Żyła	656.9
9	(Slovenia) Anže Lanišek	656.1
10	(Norway) Daniel-André Tande	654.9

==== Willingen Five ====
Rank	after all 2 events	Points
1	(Germany) Stephan Leyhe	398.0
2	(Austria) Stefan Kraft	375.8
3	(Norway) Marius Lindvik	370.8
4	(Germany) Karl Geiger	367.4
5	(Poland) Kamil Stoch	363.9
6	(Japan) Ryōyū Kobayashi	357.9
7	(Slovenia) Peter Prevc	354.3
8	(Austria) Gregor Schlierenzauer	353.3
9	(Slovenia) Timi Zajc	352.3
10	(Japan) Yukiya Satō	344.8

== Women's Individual ==
Individual events in the World Cup history

Total	FH	LH	NH	Winners
151	—	28	123	19

including LH event in Lillehammer (10 March 2020)

=== Calendar ===
N – normal hill; L – large hill
All	No.	Date	Place (Hill)	Size	Winner	Second	Third	Overall leader	R.
136	1	7 December 2019	(Norway) Lillehammer (Lysgårdsbakken HS140)	L _{020}	(Norway) Maren Lundby	(Austria) Eva Pinkelnig	(Austria) Chiara Hölzl	(Norway) Maren Lundby	
137	2	8 December 2019	(Norway) Lillehammer (Lysgårdsbakken HS140)	L _{021}	(Norway) Maren Lundby	(Austria) Chiara Hölzl	(Japan) Sara Takanashi	(Norway) Maren Lundby	
138	3	14 December 2019	(Germany) Klingenthal (Vogtland Arena HS140)	L _{022}	(Austria) Chiara Hölzl	(Slovenia) Ema Klinec	(Germany) Katharina Althaus	(Norway) Maren Lundby	
139	4	11 January 2020	(Japan) Sapporo (Ōkurayama HS137)	L _{023}	(Austria) Marita Kramer	(Norway) Maren Lundby	(Austria) Eva Pinkelnig	(Norway) Maren Lundby	
140	5	12 January 2020	(Japan) Sapporo (Ōkurayama HS137)	L _{024}	(Austria) Eva Pinkelnig	(Norway) Maren Lundby	(Austria) D. Iraschko-Stolz	(Norway) Maren Lundby	
141	6	17 January 2020	(Japan) Zaō (Yamagata HS102)	N _{117}	(Austria) Eva Pinkelnig	(Japan) Sara Takanashi	(Austria) Chiara Hölzl	(Norway) Maren Lundby	
142	7	19 January 2020	(Japan) Zaō (Yamagata HS102)	N _{118}	(Austria) Eva Pinkelnig	(Austria) Chiara Hölzl	(Norway) Maren Lundby	(Norway) Maren Lundby	
143	8	25 January 2020	(Romania) Râșnov (Trambulina Valea HS97)	N _{119}	(Austria) Chiara Hölzl	(Germany) Katharina Althaus	(Austria) Eva Pinkelnig	(Austria) Chiara Hölzl	
144	9	26 January 2020	(Romania) Râșnov (Trambulina Valea HS97)	N _{120}	(Norway) Maren Lundby	(Austria) Eva Pinkelnig	(Austria) Chiara Hölzl	(Norway) Maren Lundby	
145	10	1 February 2020	(Germany) Oberstdorf (Schattenberg HS137)	L _{025}	(Austria) Chiara Hölzl	(Norway) Maren Lundby	(Austria) D. Iraschko-Stolz	(Norway) Maren Lundby	
146	11	2 February 2020	(Germany) Oberstdorf (Schattenberg HS137)	L _{026}	(Austria) Chiara Hölzl	(Norway) Maren Lundby	(Austria) Marita Kramer	(Austria) Chiara Hölzl	
147	12	8 February 2020	(Austria) Hinzenbach (Aigner-Schanze HS90)	N _{121}	(Austria) Chiara Hölzl	(Norway) Maren Lundby	(Austria) Eva Pinkelnig	(Austria) Chiara Hölzl	
148	13	9 February 2020	(Austria) Hinzenbach (Aigner-Schanze HS90)	N _{122}	(Austria) Chiara Hölzl	(Austria) Eva Pinkelnig	(Italy) Lara Malsiner	(Austria) Chiara Hölzl	
149	14	23 February 2020	(Slovenia) Ljubno (Savina HS94)	N _{123}	(Norway) Maren Lundby	(Austria) Eva Pinkelnig	(Slovenia) Nika Križnar	(Austria) Chiara Hölzl	
prologue		7 March 2020	(Norway) Oslo (Holmenkollbakken HS134)	L _{Qro}	(Norway) Maren Lundby	(Austria) J. Seifriedsberger	(Austria) Chiara Hölzl	—	
		8 March 2020	(Norway) Oslo (Holmenkollbakken HS134)	L _{cnx}	cancelled due to strong wind and water on hill (rescheduled to Lillehammer on 9 March 2020)			—	
150	15	(Note: Cancelled individual women's event in Oslo (8 March 2020) was rescheduled to Lillehammer (9 March 2020).)9 March 2020	(Norway) Lillehammer (Lysgårdsbakken HS140)	L _{027}	(Japan) Sara Takanashi	(Norway) Maren Lundby	(Norway) Silje Opseth	(Norway) Maren Lundby	
prologue		9 March 2020	(Norway) Lillehammer (Lysgårdsbakken HS140)	L _{Qro}	Oslo individual competition schedule switch (prologue from Lillehammer was rescheduled on 10 March 2020)			—	
prologue		(Note: Cancelled women's prologue in Lillehammer (9 March) was rescheduled to 10 March.)10 March 2020	(Norway) Lillehammer (Lysgårdsbakken HS140)	L _{Qro}	(Norway) Maren Lundby	(Austria) J. Seifriedsberger	(Norway) Silje Opseth	—	
151	16	10 March 2020	(Norway) Lillehammer (Lysgårdsbakken HS140)	L _{028}	(Norway) Maren Lundby	(Norway) Silje Opseth	(Austria) Chiara Hölzl	(Norway) Maren Lundby	
prologue		11 March 2020	(Norway) Trondheim (Granåsen HS138)	L _{Qro}	(Norway) Maren Lundby	(Norway) Silje Opseth	(Slovenia) Nika Križnar	—	
		12 March 2020	(Norway) Trondheim (Granåsen HS138)	L _{cnx}	cancelled due to the COVID-19 pandemic			—	
2nd Raw Air Women's Overall (7 – 11 March 2020)					(Norway) Maren Lundby	(Norway) Silje Opseth	(Austria) Eva Pinkelnig	Raw Air	
		14 March 2020	(Russia) Nizhny Tagil (Tramplin Stork HS97)	N _{cnx}	cancelled due to the COVID-19 pandemic			—	
		15 March 2020	(Russia) Nizhny Tagil (Tramplin Stork HS97)	N _{cnx}	cancelled due to the COVID-19 pandemic			—	
		21 March 2020	(Russia) Chaykovsky (Snezhinka HS102 / 140)	N _{cnx}	cancelled due to the COVID-19 pandemic			—	
		22 March 2020	(Russia) Chaykovsky (Snezhinka HS102 / 140)	L _{cnx}	cancelled due to the COVID-19 pandemic			—	
2nd Russia Tour Blue Bird Overall (planned from 14 – 22 March 2020)					no competition this season			Blue Bird	
9th FIS World Cup Women's Overall (7 December 2019 – 21 March 2020)					(Norway) Maren Lundby	(Austria) Chiara Hölzl	(Austria) Eva Pinkelnig	World Cup Overall	

=== Standings ===
==== Overall ====
Rank	after all 16 events	Points
1	(Norway) Maren Lundby	1220
2	(Austria) Chiara Hölzl	1155
3	(Austria) Eva Pinkelnig	1029
4	(Japan) Sara Takanashi	785
5	(Germany) Katharina Althaus	617
6	(Austria) Daniela Iraschko-Stolz	506
7	(Slovenia) Nika Križnar	497
8	(Slovenia) Ema Klinec	496
9	(Austria) Marita Kramer	475
10	(Norway) Silje Opseth	472

==== Nations Cup ====
Rank	after all 18 events	Points
1	Austria	4457
2	Norway	2537
3	Japan	2086
4	Germany	1889
5	Slovenia	1862
6	Russia	1091
7	Italy	596
8	France	183
9	Poland	143
10	Czech Republic	107

==== Prize money ====
Rank	after all 18 payouts	CHF
1	(Austria) Chiara Hölzl	46,890
2	(Norway) Maren Lundby	46,765
3	(Austria) Eva Pinkelnig	42,102
4	(Japan) Sara Takanashi	30,580
5	(Germany) Katharina Althaus	23,446
6	(Austria) Daniela Iraschko-Stolz	21,924
7	(Austria) Marita Kramer	20,974
8	(Slovenia) Nika Križnar	19,560
9	(Slovenia) Ema Klinec	19,465
10	(Norway) Silje Opseth	18,284

==== Raw Air ====
Rank	after all 5 events	Points
1	(Norway) Maren Lundby	944.5
2	(Norway) Silje Opseth	900.1
3	(Austria) Eva Pinkelnig	830.4
4	(Germany) Katharina Althaus	830.2
5	(Austria) Chiara Hölzl	827.8
6	(Japan) Sara Takanashi	816.2
7	(Slovenia) Ema Klinec	776.3
8	(Slovenia) Nika Križnar	755.7
9	(Austria) Daniela Iraschko-Stolz	689.8
10	(Germany) Juliane Seyfarth	687.1

== Team events ==
Team events in the World Cup history

Total	FH	LH	NH	Winners	Competition
107	23	82	2	7	Men's team
6	—	—	6	3	Women's team

including LH event in Oslo (7 March 2020)

=== Calendar ===
All	No.	Date	Place (Hill)	Size	Winner	Second	Third	R.
Men's team
103	1	23 November 2019	(Poland) Wisła (Malinka HS134)	L _{078}	Austria Philipp Aschenwald; Daniel Huber; Jan Hörl; Stefan Kraft	Norway Daniel-André Tande; Thomas Aasen Markeng; Marius Lindvik; Robert Johansson	Poland Piotr Żyła; Jakub Wolny; Kamil Stoch; Dawid Kubacki	
104	2	14 December 2019	(Germany) Klingenthal (Vogtland Arena HS140)	L _{079}	Poland Piotr Żyła; Jakub Wolny; Kamil Stoch; Dawid Kubacki	Austria Philipp Aschenwald; Gregor Schlierenzauer; Michael Hayböck; Stefan Kraft	Japan Yukiya Satō; Daiki Itō; Junshirō Kobayashi; Ryōyū Kobayashi	
105	3	25 January 2020	(Poland) Zakopane (Wielka Krokiew HS140)	L _{080}	Germany Constantin Schmid; Markus Eisenbichler; Stephan Leyhe; Karl Geiger	Norway Marius Lindvik; Robert Johansson; Daniel-André Tande; Johann André Forfang	Slovenia Anže Lanišek; Domen Prevc; Timi Zajc; Peter Prevc	
106	4	29 February 2020	(Finland) Lahti (Salpausselkä HS130)	L _{081}	Germany Constantin Schmid; Pius Paschke; Stephan Leyhe; Karl Geiger	Slovenia Cene Prevc; Timi Zajc; Peter Prevc; Anže Lanišek	Austria Philipp Aschenwald; Stefan Huber; Michael Hayböck; Stefan Kraft	
107	5	7 March 2020	(Norway) Oslo (Holmenkollbakken HS134)	L _{082}	Norway Johann André Forfang; Robert Johansson; Daniel-André Tande; Marius Lindvik	Germany Constantin Schmid; Pius Paschke; Stephan Leyhe; Karl Geiger	Slovenia Žiga Jelar; Timi Zajc; Anže Lanišek; Peter Prevc	
		14 March 2020	(Norway) Vikersund (Vikersundbakken HS240)	F _{cnx}	cancelled due to the COVID-19 pandemic			
Women's team
5	1	18 January 2020	(Japan) Zaō (Yamagata HS102)	N _{005}	Austria Daniela Iraschko-Stolz; Marita Kramer; Chiara Hölzl; Eva Pinkelnig	Japan Yūki Itō; Nozomi Maruyama; Sara Takanashi; Yūka Setō	Norway Anna Odine Strøm; Ingebjørg Saglien Bråten; Silje Opseth; Maren Lundby	
6	2	22 February 2020	(Slovenia) Ljubno (Savina HS94)	N _{006}	Austria Daniela Iraschko-Stolz; Marita Kramer; Eva Pinkelnig; Chiara Hölzl	Slovenia Nika Križnar; Špela Rogelj; Katra Komar; Ema Klinec	Norway Anna Odine Strøm; Thea Minyan Bjørseth; Silje Opseth; Maren Lundby	

== Qualifications ==
=== Men ===
No.	Place	Qualifications	Competition	Size	Winner
1	(Poland) Wisła	22 November 2019	24 November 2019	L	(Germany) Karl Geiger
2	(Finland) Ruka	29 November 2019	30 November 2019	L	(Slovenia) Timi Zajc
	(Finland) Ruka	1 December 2019		L	strong wind
3	(Russia) Nizhny Tagil	6 December 2019	7 December 2019	L	(Norway) Johann André Forfang
4	(Russia) Nizhny Tagil	8 December 2019		L	(Norway) Johann André Forfang
5	(Germany) Klingenthal	13 December 2019	15 December 2019	L	(Austria) Stefan Kraft
6	(Switzerland) Engelberg	21 December 2019		L	(Austria) Stefan Kraft
	(Switzerland) Engelberg	22 December 2019		L	cancelled; all 63 competed
7	(Germany) Oberstdorf	28 December 2019	29 December 2019	L	(Austria) Stefan Kraft
8	(Germany) Garmisch-Pa	31 December 2019	1 January 2020	L	(Germany) Karl Geiger
9	(Austria) Innsbruck	3 January 2020	4 January 2020	L	(Norway) Marius Lindvik
10	(Austria) Bischofshofen	5 January 2020	6 January 2020	L	(Austria) Stefan Kraft
11	(Italy) Val di Fiemme	10 January 2020	11 January 2020	N	(Poland) Dawid Kubacki
12	(Italy) Val di Fiemme	12 January 2020		N	(Germany) Karl Geiger
13	(Germany) Titisee-Neustadt	17 January 2020	18 February 2020; 19 February 2020	L	(Japan) Ryōyū Kobayashi
14	(Poland) Zakopane	24 January 2020	26 January 2020	L	(Poland) Dawid Kubacki
15	(Japan) Sapporo	31 January 2020	1 February 2020	L	(Japan) Ryōyū Kobayashi
16	(Japan) Sapporo	2 February 2020		L	(Poland) Dawid Kubacki
17	(Germany) Willingen	8 February 2020		L	(Germany) Stephan Leyhe
	(Austria) Bad Mitterndorf	14 February 2020	15 February 2020	F	strong wind; all 53 competed
18	(Austria) Bad Mitterndorf	16 February 2020		F	(Japan) Ryōyū Kobayashi
19	(Romania) Râșnov	20 February 2020	21 February 2020	N	(Norway) Marius Lindvik
20	(Romania) Râșnov	22 February 2020		N	(Germany) Karl Geiger
21	(Finland) Lahti	28 February 2020		L	(Poland) Dawid Kubacki
	(Finland) Lahti	1 March 2020		L	all competed
22	(Norway) Oslo/Lillehammer (Note: Men's qualification in Oslo, men's competition was rescheduled to Lillehammer (9 March).)	6 March 2020	9 March 2020	L	(Germany) Constantin Schmid
23	(Norway) Lillehammer	10 March 2020		L	(Norway) Robin Pedersen
24	(Norway) Trondheim	11 March 2020	12 March 2020	L	(Japan) Ryōyū Kobayashi
25	(Norway) Vikersund	13 March 2020	15 March 2020	F	cancelled

=== Women ===
No.	Place	Qualifications	Competition	Size	Winner
1	(Norway) Lillehammer	6 December 2019	7 December 2019	N	(Norway) Maren Lundby
2	(Norway) Lillehammer	8 December 2019		L	(Norway) Maren Lundby
	(Germany) Klingenthal	13 December 2019	14 December 2019	L	cancelled; all 40 competed
3	(Japan) Sapporo	11 January 2020		L	(Austria) Marita Kramer
4	(Japan) Sapporo	12 January 2020		L	(Austria) Chiara Hölzl
5	(Japan) Zaō	16 January 2020	17 January 2020	N	(Austria) Marita Kramer
6	(Japan) Zaō	19 January 2020		N	(Austria) Chiara Hölzl
7	(Romania) Râșnov	24 January 2020	25 January 2020	N	(Austria) Chiara Hölzl
8	(Romania) Râșnov	26 January 2020		N	(Germany) Katharina Althaus
9	(Germany) Oberstdorf	31 January 2020	1 February 2020	L	(Slovenia) Nika Križnar
10	(Germany) Oberstdorf	2 February 2020		L	(Austria) Chiara Hölzl
11	(Austria) Hinzenbach	7 February 2020	8 February 2020	N	(Austria) Chiara Hölzl
12	(Austria) Hinzenbach	9 February 2020		N	(Austria) Chiara Hölzl
13	(Slovenia) Ljubno	23 February 2019		N	(Austria) Eva Pinkelnig
14	(Norway) Oslo/Lillehammer (Note: Women's qualification in Oslo, women's competition was rescheduled to Lillehammer (9 March).)	7 March 2020	9 March 2020	L	(Norway) Maren Lundby
15	(Norway) Lillehammer	10 March 2020		L	(Norway) Maren Lundby
16	(Norway) Trondheim	12 March 2020	12 March 2020	L	(Norway) Maren Lundby
17	(Russia) Nizhny Tagil	13 March 2020	14 March 2020	N	cancelled
18	(Russia) Nizhny Tagil	15 March 2020		N	cancelled
19	(Russia) Chaykovsky	20 March 2020	21 March 2020	N	cancelled
20	(Russia) Chaykovsky	22 March 2020		L	cancelled

== Achievements ==
First World Cup career victory

Men

- (Japan) Yukiya Satō (24), in his third season – the WC 3 in Nizhny Tagil
- (Norway) Marius Lindvik (21), in his fourth season – the WC 9 in Garmisch-Partenkirchen
- (Germany) Stephan Leyhe (28), in his eighth season – the WC 19 in Willingen

Women

- (Austria) Chiara Hölzl (22), in her eighth season – the WC 3 in Klingenthal
- (Austria) Marita Kramer (18), in her third season – the WC 4 in Sapporo
- (Austria) Eva Pinkelnig (31), in her sixth season – the WC 5 in Sapporo

First World Cup podium

Men

- (Slovenia) Anže Lanišek (23), in his seventh season – the WC 1 in Wisła
- (Austria) Philipp Aschenwald (24), in his fifth season – the WC 2 in Ruka
- (Switzerland) Killian Peier (24), in his seventh season – the WC 4 in Nizhny Tagil
- (Norway) Marius Lindvik (21), in his fourth season – the WC 5 in Klingenthal
- (Austria) Jan Hörl (21), in his second season – the WC 7 in Engelberg
- (Germany) Constantin Schmid (20), in his fourth season – the WC 23 in Râșnov
- (Slovenia) Žiga Jelar (22), in his fourth season – the WC 27 in Lillehammer

Women

- (Austria) Marita Kramer (18), in her third season – the WC 4 in Sapporo
- (Italy) Lara Malsiner (19), in her fifth season – the WC 13 in Hinzenbach
- (Norway) Silje Opseth (20), in her fifth season – the WC 15 in Lillehammer

Number of wins this season (in brackets are all-time wins)

Men

- (Austria) Stefan Kraft – 5 (21)
- (Germany) Karl Geiger – 4 (6)
- (Poland) Kamil Stoch – 3 (36)
- (Japan) Ryōyū Kobayashi – 3 (16)
- (Poland) Dawid Kubacki – 3 (4)
- (Norway) Daniel-André Tande – 2 (7)
- (Norway) Marius Lindvik – 2 (2)
- (Japan) Yukiya Satō – 2 (2)
- (Slovenia) Peter Prevc – 1 (23)
- (Poland) Piotr Żyła – 1 (2)
- (Germany) Stephan Leyhe – 1 (1)

Women

- (Austria) Chiara Hölzl – 6 (6)
- (Norway) Maren Lundby – 5 (30)
- (Austria) Eva Pinkelnig – 3 (3)
- (Japan) Sara Takanashi – 1 (57)
- (Austria) Marita Kramer – 1 (1)

== Retirements ==
=== Men ===
- (Norway) Fredrik Bjerkeengen
- (Italy) Federico Cecon
- (Austria) Thomas Hofer
- (Slovenia) Jaka Hvala
- (Japan) Kenshiro Ito
- (Switzerland) Gabriel Karlen
- (Estonia) Martti Nõmme
- (Slovenia) Jurij Tepeš
- (Austria) Elias Tollinger
- (Czech Republic) Tomáš Vančura

=== Women ===
- (Italy) Elena Runggaldier

== See also ==
- 2019 Grand Prix (top level summer series)
- 2019–20 FIS Continental Cup (2nd level competition)
