= Kamila Karpiel =

Polish female ski jumper (born 2001)

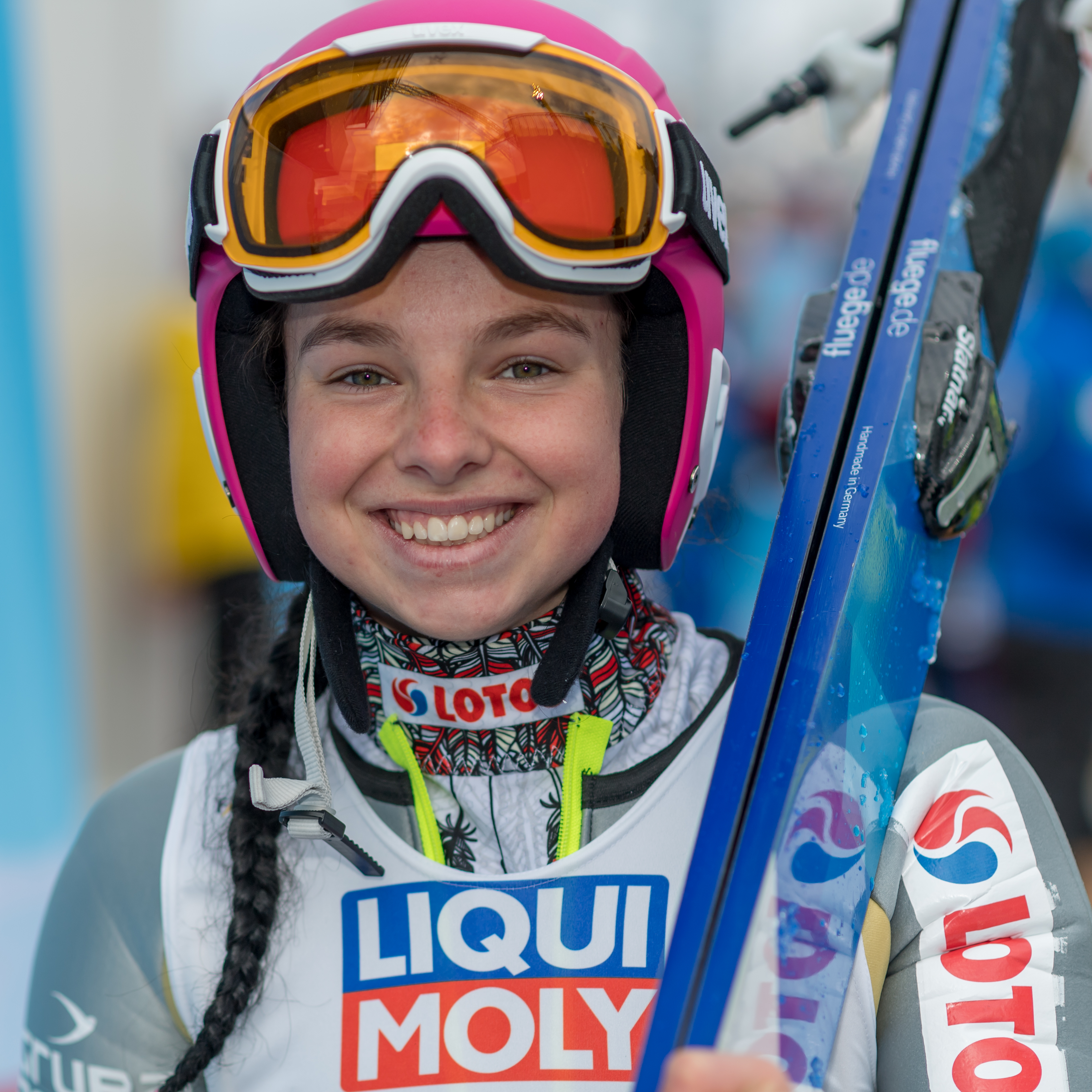
- Karpiel at the 2019 World Championships in Seefeld

Personal information
- Nationality: Poland
- Born: 25 November 2001 (age 24) Poland

Sport
- Sport: Skiing
- Club: AZS Zakopane

World Cup career
- Seasons: 2018–present
- Indiv. starts: 4

Achievements and titles
- Personal bests: 121 m (397 ft); Lillehammer, 11 March 2019
- Updated on 2 March 2019

Kamila Karpiel (born 25 November 2001) is a Polish female ski jumper. She is a member of the national team, two-time Polish Champion (2017, 2018) and competed at the 2019 World Championships.

Her best place in the World Cup competition is 26th in Ljubno ob Savinji during the 2018–2019 season.

On 2 March 2019 she took part in the mixed team, alongside Kamil Stoch, Dawid Kubacki and Kinga Rajda, at the 2019 World Championships, it was Poland's debut in the mixed team at World Championships. Polish mixed team was surprisingly in third after the first round and took 6th place at the end.

== World Championships ==
Place	Day	Year	Locality	Hill	Point K	HS	Competition	Jump 1	Jump 2	Note (points)	Loss (points)	Winner
23.	27 February	2019	Seefeld	Toni-Seelos-Olympiaschanze	K-99	HS-109	individual	97.5 m	93.5 m	90.8	205.7	Maren Lundby
6.	2 March	2019	Seefeld	Toni-Seelos-Olympiaschanze	K-99	HS-109	mixed team	91.5 m	97.0 m	914.9 (202.2)	97.3	Germany
