= Daniela Iraschko-Stolz =

Austrian ski jumper (born 1983)

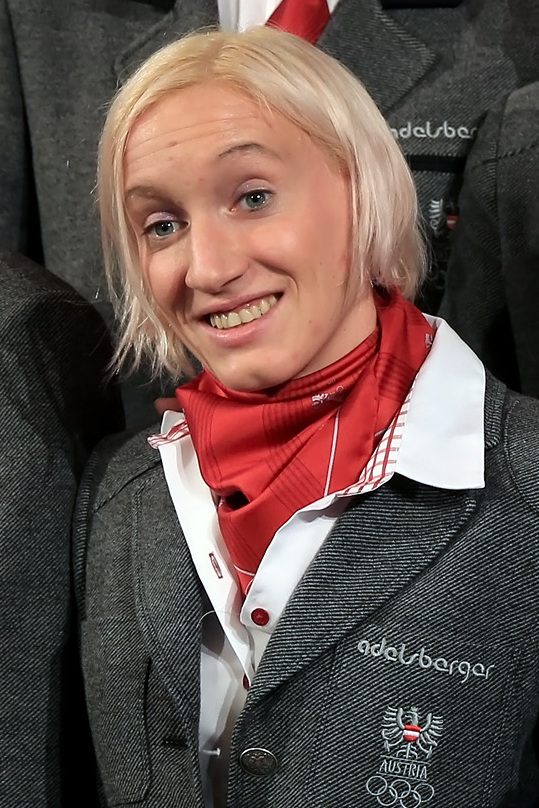
- Iraschko-Stolz in 2014

Personal information
- Nationality: Austria
- Born: 21 November 1983 (age 42) Eisenerz, Austria
- Height: 1.64 m (5 ft 5 in)

Sport
- Sport: Skiing
- Club: WSV Eisenerz

World Cup career
- Seasons: 2012–present
- Indiv. starts: 136
- Indiv. podiums: 53
- Indiv. wins: 16
- Team starts: 8
- Team podiums: 7
- Team wins: 3
- Overall titles: 1 (2015)

Achievements and titles
- Personal bests: 200 m (660 ft) (656 ft); Kulm, 29 January 2003
Medal record
Olympic Games
Silver medal – second place	2014 Sochi	Normal hill
World Championships
Gold medal – first place	2011 Holmenkollen	Individual NH
Gold medal – first place	2021 Oberstdorf	Team NH
Silver medal – second place	2017 Lahti	Mixed team NH
Silver medal – second place	2019 Seefeld	Team NH
Silver medal – second place	2019 Seefeld	Mixed team NH
Bronze medal – third place	2015 Falun	Individual NH
Bronze medal – third place	2019 Seefeld	Individual NH
Bronze medal – third place	2021 Oberstdorf	Mixed team NH
- Updated on 13 March 2022

Daniela Iraschko-Stolz
Personal information
- Date of birth: 21 November 1983 (age 42)
- Place of birth: Eisenerz, Austria
- Height: 1.64 m (5 ft 5 in)
- Positions: Attacking midfielder; forward

Senior career*
Years	Team	Apps	(Gls)
1993–2003	WSV Eisenerz		
2003–2006	Innsbrucker AC		
2006–2017	Wacker Innsbruck		
- * Club domestic league appearances and goals as of 17 December 2022

Daniela Iraschko-Stolz (née Iraschko; born 21 November 1983) is an Austrian former ski jumper and footballer.

She is one of the ski jumping's most successful female athletes, having won the 2014/15 women's World Cup season, and has the third most individual female World Cup wins – 12 – as of March 2017. From 2003 to 2023 she held the women's ski flying world record of 200 m (660 ft), and was the first woman to reach 200 m. She is considered a pioneer in the discipline of women's ski jumping having made her first jump at the age of 12 in the year 1995.

In football, she has played at the highest levels of the domestic women's game.

== Career ==
=== Ski jumping ===
Iraschko-Stolz has competed in ski jumping since 2000. She is best known for her three individual victories at the Holmenkollen Ski Festival (2000, 2001, 2003). In 2009–10 she won the women's Continental Cup. She won the gold medal at the 2007 Winter Universiade in Turin, gold at the 2011 Ski Jumping World Championships in Holmenkollen, and silver at the 2014 Winter Olympics in Sochi. She has nine individual wins at the World Cup level and finished second overall in the first-ever women's World Cup season in 2011/12.

On 29 January 2003, Iraschko-Stolz became the first woman to fly over 200 metres during practice for a World Cup event on the ski flying hill in Kulm, a women's world record which stood until 2023.

Due to being injured, she was unable to compete in the Nordic World Championships 2013.

In 2014, she won a silver medal in the normal hill competition at the Winter Olympics in Sochi.

At the Nordic World Ski Championship 2015 in Falun, she won a bronze medal in the normal hill competition. At the Nordic World Ski Championship 2017 in Lahti, she won together with Michael Hayböck, Jacqueline Seifriedsberger, and Stefan Kraft the silver medal in the mixed team competition.

She last competed in the Beijing 2022 Olympic Games & retired from the sport in 2023 at the age of 39.

=== Football ===
Iraschko started playing association football at a young age and started her career at WSV Eisenerz in 1993. In 2003 she moved to the Bundesliga side Innsbrucker AC, and after the dissolution of the women's team in 2006 she moved to Wacker Innsbruck. In 2008, 2009 and 2010 she became Austrian runner-up with the team behind the champions SV Neulengbach, in 2009 and 2012 she was in the Austrian Cup final.

Her last match was in 2016 where she played as a striker for FC Wacker (FC Wacker Innsbruck).

== Honours and statistics ==
=== Ski Jumping World Cup ===
==== Standings ====
Season	Overall	ST	AK	L3	RA	BB
2011/12	2nd place, silver medalist(s)	N/A	N/A	N/A	N/A	N/A
2012/13	10	N/A	N/A	N/A	N/A	N/A
2013/14	5	N/A	N/A	N/A	N/A	N/A
2014/15	1st place, gold medalist(s)	N/A	N/A	N/A	N/A	N/A
2015/16	2nd place, silver medalist(s)	N/A	N/A	N/A	N/A	N/A
2016/17	6	N/A	N/A	N/A	N/A	N/A
2017/18	7	N/A	N/A	—	N/A	N/A
2018/19	8	N/A	N/A	5	4	—
2019/20	6	N/A	N/A	N/A	9	N/A
2020/21	5	N/A	N/A	N/A	N/A	5
2021/22	14		6	N/A	—	N/A

==== Wins ====
No.	Season	Date	Location	Hill	Size
1	2011/12	4 February 2012	(Austria) Hinzenbach	Aigner-Schanze HS94	NH
2	2011/12	5 February 2012	(Austria) Hinzenbach	Aigner-Schanze HS94	NH
3	2012/13	9 December 2012	(Russia) Sochi	RusSki Gorki HS106	NH
4	2013/14	25 January 2012	(Slovenia) Planica	Normal hill HS104	NH
5	2013/14	26 January 2012	(Slovenia) Planica	Normal hill HS104	NH
6	2014/15	24 January 2015	(Germany) Oberstdorf	Schattenbergschanze HS106	NH
7	2014/15	25 January 2015	(Germany) Oberstdorf	Schattenbergschanze HS106	NH
8	2014/15	31 January 2015	(Austria) Hinzenbach	Aigner-Schanze HS94	NH
9	2014/15	7 February 2015	(Romania) Râșnov	Trambulina Valea Cărbunării HS100	NH
10	2014/15	15 February 2015	(Slovenia) Ljubno	Savina Ski Jumping Center HS95	NH
11	2015/16	12 December 2015	(Russia) Nizhny Tagil	Tramplin Stork HS97	NH
12	2015/16	14 February 2016	(Slovenia) Ljubno	Savina Ski Jumping Center HS95	NH
13	2017/18	28 January 2018	(Slovenia) Ljubno	Savina Ski Jumping Center HS94	NH
14	2018/19	12 January 2019	(Japan) Sapporo	Ōkurayama HS137	LH
15	2018/19	18 January 2019	(Japan) Zaō	Yamagata HS102	NH
16	2018/19	10 March 2019	(Norway) Oslo	Holmenkollbakken HS134	LH

=== Austrian football ===
With Wacker Innsbruck:

- 2x Austrian Cup finalist: 2009, 2012
- 3x Austrian Bundesliga runner-up: 2008, 2009, 2010

== Personal life ==
She married her partner in 2013.
