= Ramona Straub =

German ski jumper

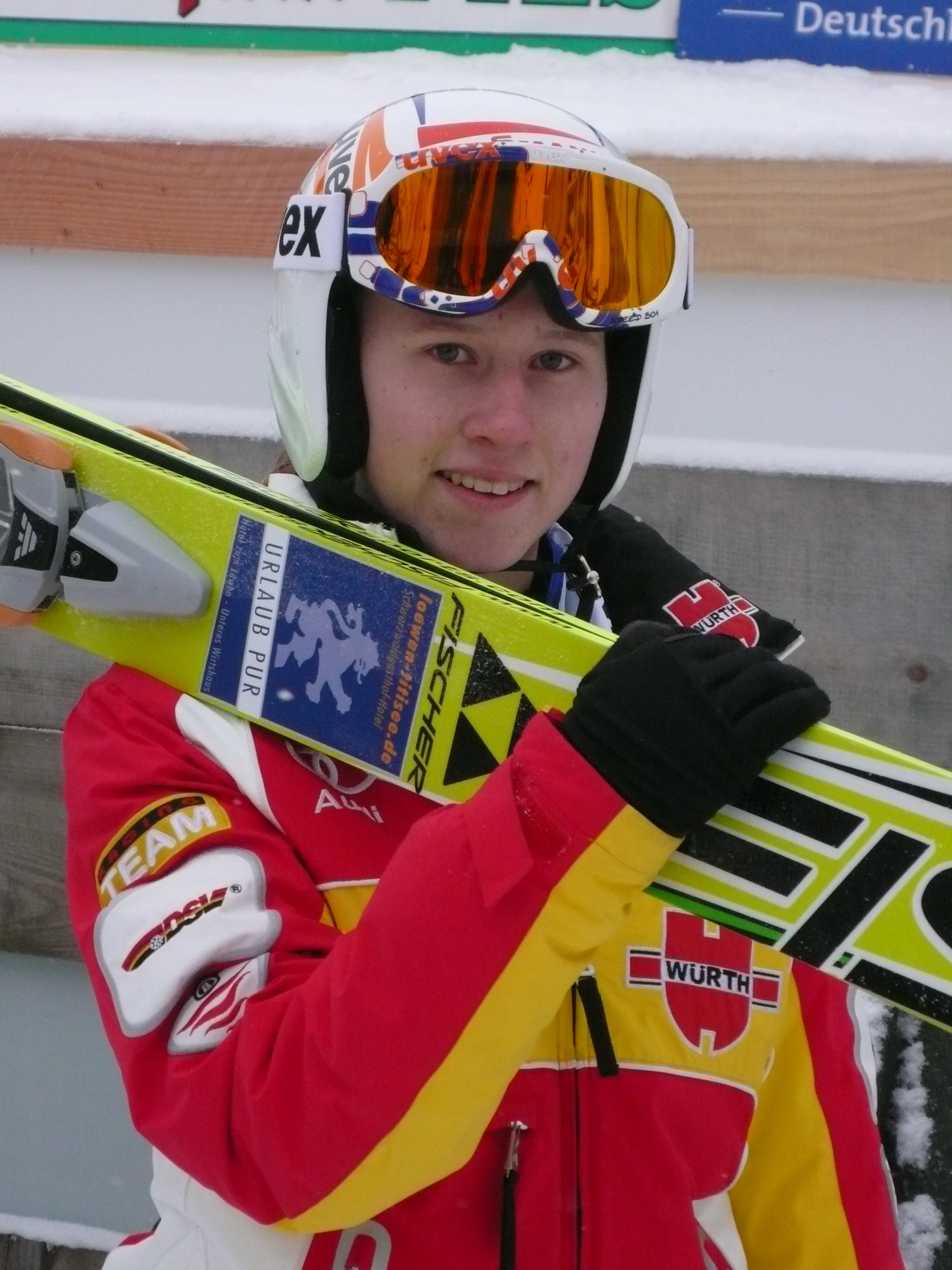
- Straub in 2010

Personal information
- Nationality: Germany
- Born: 19 September 1993 (age 32) Titisee-Neustadt, Germany
- Height: 1.64 m (5 ft 5 in)

Sport
- Sport: Skiing
- Club: SC Langenordnach

World Cup career
- Seasons: 2012–present
Medal record
World Championships
Gold medal – first place	2019 Seefeld	Team NH
- Updated on 26 February 2019

Ramona Straub (born 19 September 1993) is a German ski jumper, who represents the club SC Langenordnach.

She competed at the 2018 Winter Olympics.

== World Championship results ==
Year	Normal hill	Team NH	Mixed team
2017	33		—
2019	18	1	—
