= Katharina Schmid =

German ski jumper (born 1996)

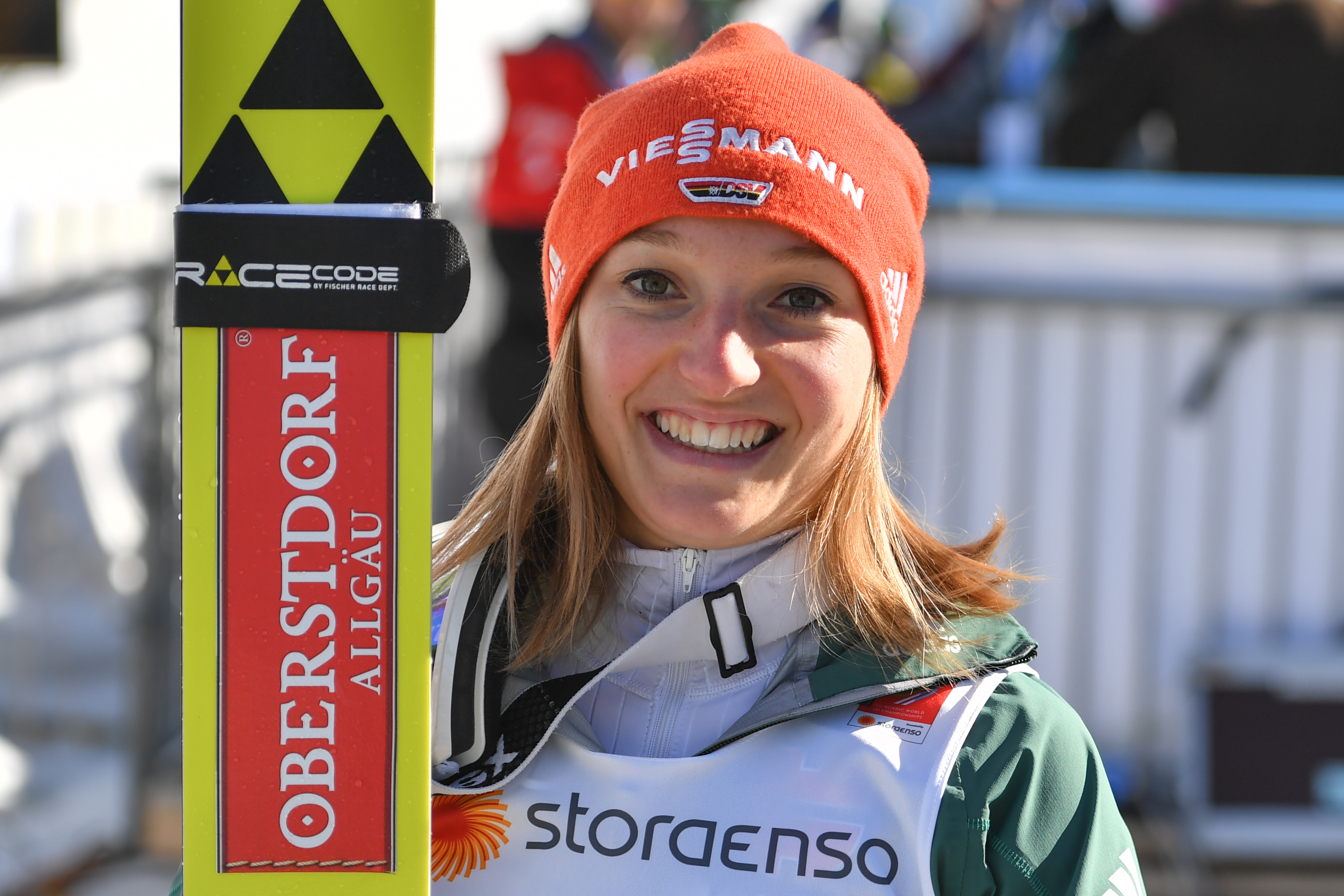
- Schmid in 2019

Personal information
- Nationality: Germany
- Born: 23 May 1996 (age 30) Oberstdorf, Germany
- Height: 1.57 m (5 ft 2 in)‌

Sport
- Sport: Skiing
- Club: SC 1906 Oberstdorf

World Cup career
- Seasons: 2012–2026
- Indiv. starts: 248
- Indiv. podiums: 59
- Indiv. wins: 19
- Team starts: 15
- Team podiums: 8
- Team wins: 3

Achievements and titles
- Personal bests: 198.5 m (651 ft); Vikersund, 19 March 2023
Medal record
Women's ski jumping
Representing Germany
Olympic Games
Silver medal – second place	2018 Pyeongchang	Individual NH
Silver medal – second place	2022 Beijing	Individual NH
World Championships
Gold medal – first place	2015 Falun	Mixed team NH
Gold medal – first place	2019 Seefeld	Team NH
Gold medal – first place	2019 Seefeld	Mixed team NH
Gold medal – first place	2021 Oberstdorf	Mixed team NH
Gold medal – first place	2023 Planica	Individual NH
Gold medal – first place	2023 Planica	Team NH
Gold medal – first place	2023 Planica	Mixed team NH
Silver medal – second place	2019 Seefeld	Individual NH
Bronze medal – third place	2023 Planica	Individual LH
Bronze medal – third place	2025 Trondheim	Team NH
- Updated on 6 January 2025

Katharina Schmid (née Althaus; born 23 May 1996) is a German former ski jumper. She is a seven-time world champion, including one individual title and six team titles, as well as a two-time Olympic silver medalist, making her one of the most decorated athletes in the history of ski jumping.

In May 2023, she married Patrick Schmid, the brother of Nordic combined athlete Julian Schmid.

== Career ==
She has competed at World Cup level since the 2011/12 season. She finished 2nd in the 2017/18 and 2018/19 World Cup overall, and won individual silver medals at the 2018 and 2022 Winter Olympics.

She became the mixed team ski jumping world champion together with her German teammates Carina Vogt, Richard Freitag, and Severin Freund in Falun at the FIS Nordic World Ski Championships 2015. She took her first World Cup win on 12 February 2017 in Ljubno.

At the FIS Nordic World Ski Championships 2023 in Planica she won medals in all four disciplines (two Individual and two team events), three gold and one bronze medal.

== Record ==
=== Winter Olympics Games ===
Year	Place	Normal	Large	Mixed
2014	(Russia) Sochi	23	N/A	N/A
2018	(South Korea) Pyeongchang	2nd place, silver medalist(s)	N/A	N/A
2022	(China) Beijing	2nd place, silver medalist(s)	N/A	9
2026	(Italy) Milan and Cortina d'Ampezzo	16	41	9

=== FIS Nordic World Ski Championships ===
Year	Place	Individual		Team	
Year	Place	Normal	Large	Women	Mixed
2013	(Italy) Val di Fiemme	32	N/A	N/A	—
2015	(Sweden) Falun	17	N/A	N/A	1
2017	(Finland) Lahti	8	N/A	N/A	—
2019	(Austria) Seefeld	2	N/A	1	1
2021	(Germany) Oberstdorf	10	12	5	1
2023	(Slovenia) Planica	1	3	1	1
2025	(Norway) Trondheim	19	19	3	4

== World Cup ==
=== Standings ===
Season	Overall	ST	AK	L3	RA	BB
2011/12	28	N/A				
2012/13	22	N/A				
2013/14	13	N/A				
2014/15	9	N/A				
2015/16	12	N/A				
2016/17	4	N/A				
2017/18	2nd place, silver medalist(s)	N/A		1st place, gold medalist(s)	N/A	
2018/19	2nd place, silver medalist(s)	N/A		1st place, gold medalist(s)	2nd place, silver medalist(s)	3rd place, bronze medalist(s)
2019/20	5	N/A			4	N/A
2020/21	9	N/A				8
2021/22	4	7	32	N/A	20	N/A
2022/23	2nd place, silver medalist(s)	5	N/A		2nd place, silver medalist(s)	N/A
2023/24	10	N/A			4	N/A

=== Wins ===
No.	Season	Date	Location	Hill	Size
1	2016/17	12 February 2017	(Slovenia) Ljubno	Savina Ski Jumping Center HS95	NH
2	2017/18	2 December 2017	(Norway) Lillehammer	Lysgårdsbakken HS98	NH
3	2017/18	3 December 2017	(Norway) Lillehammer	Lysgårdsbakken HS140	LH
4	2017/18	3 March 2018	(Romania) Râșnov	Trambulina Valea Cărbunări HS97	NH
5	2018/19	2 December 2018	(Norway) Lillehammer	Lysgårdsbakken HS140	LH
6	2018/19	15 December 2018	(France) Prémanon	Les Tuffes HS90	NH
7	2018/19	16 December 2018	(France) Prémanon	Les Tuffes HS90	NH
8	2021/22	4 December 2021	(Norway) Lillehammer	Lysgårdsbakken HS98	NH
9	2022/23	3 December 2022	(Norway) Lillehammer	Lysgårdsbakken HS98	NH
10	2022/23	11 December 2022	(Germany) Titisee-Neustadt	Hochfirstschanze HS142	LH
11	2022/23	7 January 2023	(Japan) Sapporo	Ōkurayama HS137	LH
12	2022/23	28 January 2023	(Germany) Hinterzarten	Adler Ski Stadium HS111	LH
13	2022/23	4 February 2023	(Germany) Willingen	Mühlenkopfschanze HS147	LH
14	2022/23	17 February 2023	(Romania) Râșnov	Trambulina Valea Cărbunări HS97	NH
15	2022/23	15 March 2023	(Norway) Lillehammer	Lysgårdsbakken HS140	LH
16	2024/25	24 November 2024	(Norway) Lillehammer	Lysgårdsbakken HS140	LH
17	2024/25	14 December 2024	(China) Zhangjiakou	Snow Ruyi HS106	NH
18	2024/25	15 December 2024	(China) Zhangjiakou	Snow Ruyi HS106	NH
19	2024/25	5 January 2025	(Austria) Villach	Alpenarena HS98	NH
