= Maren Lundby =

Norwegian ski jumper (born 1994)

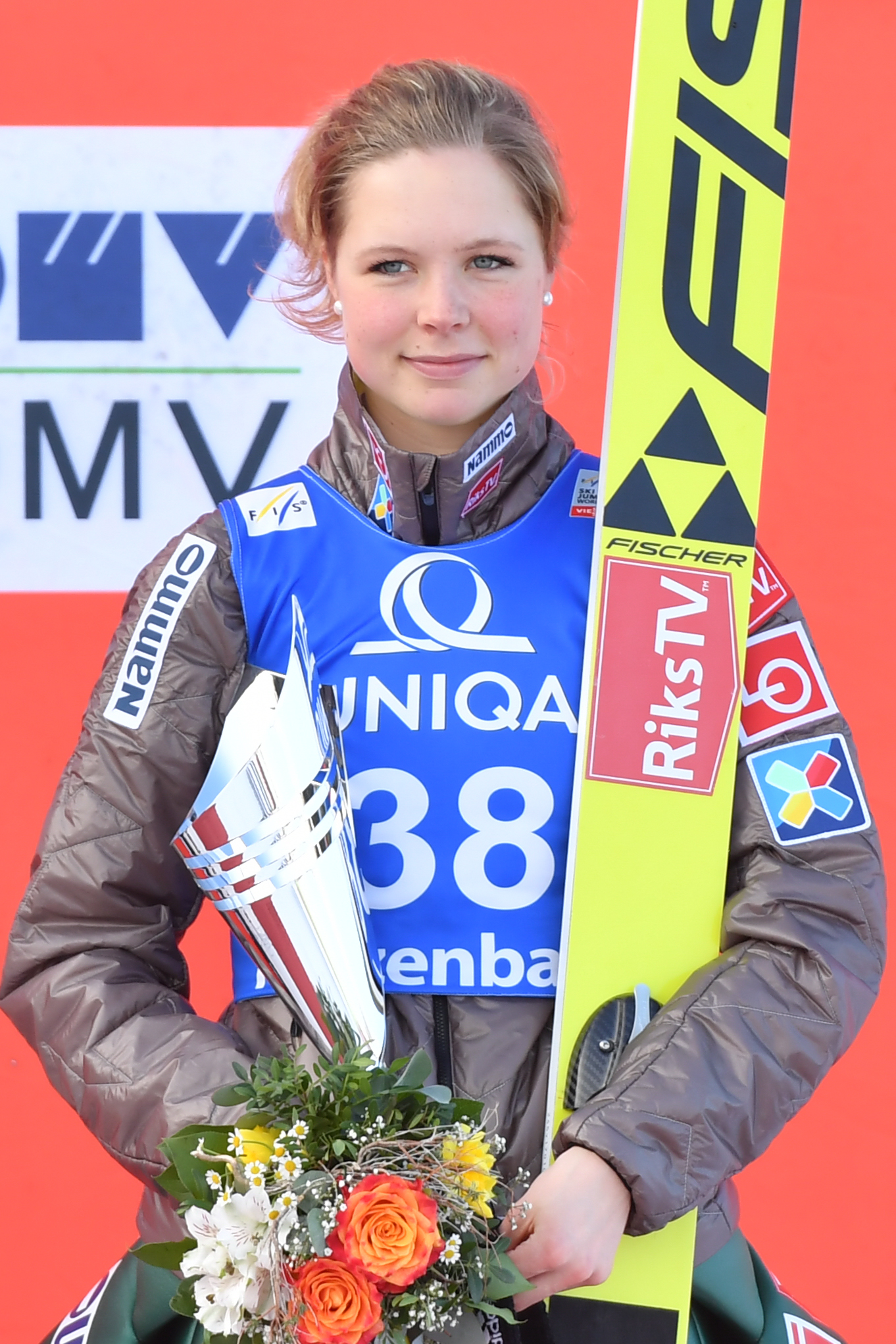
- Lundby in Hinzenbach, 2017

Personal information
- Nationality: Norway
- Born: 7 September 1994 (age 31) Gjøvik, Norway
- Height: 1.72 m (5 ft 8 in)

Sport
- Sport: Skiing
- Club: Kolbu KK

World Cup career
- Seasons: 2012–2021; 2023
- Indiv. starts: 148
- Indiv. podiums: 62
- Indiv. wins: 30
- Team starts: 10
- Team podiums: 7
- Team wins: 2
- Overall titles: 3 (2018, 2019, 2020)

Achievements and titles
- Personal bests: 216.5 m (710 ft); Vikersund, 19 March 2023
Medal record
Women's ski jumping
Representing Norway
Olympic Games
Gold medal – first place	2018 Pyeongchang	Individual NH
World Championships
Gold medal – first place	2019 Seefeld	Individual NH
Gold medal – first place	2021 Oberstdorf	Individual LH
Silver medal – second place	2015 Falun	Mixed team NH
Silver medal – second place	2021 Oberstdorf	Individual NH
Silver medal – second place	2021 Oberstdorf	Mixed team NH
Silver medal – second place	2023 Planica	Individual LH
Bronze medal – third place	2019 Seefeld	Team NH
Bronze medal – third place	2019 Seefeld	Mixed team NH
Bronze medal – third place	2021 Oberstdorf	Team NH
Bronze medal – third place	2023 Planica	Team NH
Junior World Championships
Bronze medal – third place	2014 Val di Fiemme	Individual NH
- Updated on 1 March 2023

Maren Lundby (born 7 September 1994) is a Norwegian former ski jumper. She is one of the most successful ski jumpers in the history of the sport, having won three consecutive World Cup overall titles (an all-time record shared with Adam Małysz and Nika Prevc), thirty individual World Cup competitions, and gold medals at the 2018 Winter Olympics and the 2019 and 2021 World Championships.

Lundby is also known as an advocate for gender equality in the sport. Because of her efforts, women are now allowed to jump on the large hill during the World Championships.

== Ski jumping career ==
Lundby hails from Bøverbru and represents the Kolbu KK ski club. She made her debut in the Continental Cup, the highest level in women's ski jumping at the time, on 12 August 2007 with a 56th place in Bischofsgruen. At age 14, she made history as the first female ski jumper in a World Championship, when she jumped with bib number 1 at the FIS Nordic World Ski Championships 2009 in Liberec. On 6 September 2010, she made the first jump when the new Midtstubakken in Oslo was opened. She landed on 87 meters. 14 March 2019, Lundby won the first women's edition of Raw Air. 12 March 2020, Lundby won the second edition of Raw Air and also became the first woman to win the World Cup three years in a row. She is the first ski jumper to do so since Adam Małysz in 2001–2003. On 3 March 2021, Lundby became the first female world champion on the large hill.

In October 2021, Lundby withdrew from the 2022 Winter Olympics and said she had difficulties losing weight and did not feel she could perform at the top level.

She was awarded the Holmenkollen Medal in 2021.

== Major tournament results ==
=== Olympics ===
Year	Place	NH
2014	(Russia) Sochi	8
2018	(South Korea) Pyeongchang	1st place, gold medalist(s)

=== FIS World Nordic Ski Championships ===
Year	Place	NH	LH	Team NH	Mixed NH
2009	(Czech Republic) Liberec	22	N/A	N/A	N/A
2011	(Norway) Oslo	11	N/A	N/A	N/A
2013	(Italy) Val di Fiemme	25	N/A	N/A	4
2015	(Sweden) Falun	15	N/A	N/A	2nd place, silver medalist(s)
2017	(Finland) Lahti	4	N/A	N/A	5
2019	(Austria) Seefeld	1st place, gold medalist(s)	N/A	3rd place, bronze medalist(s)	3rd place, bronze medalist(s)
2021	(Germany) Oberstdorf	2nd place, silver medalist(s)	1st place, gold medalist(s)	3rd place, bronze medalist(s)	2nd place, silver medalist(s)
2023	(Slovenia) Planica	7	2nd place, silver medalist(s)	3rd place, bronze medalist(s)	N/A

== World Cup ==
=== Standings ===
Season	Overall	L3	RA	BB
2011/12	26	N/A	N/A	N/A
2012/13	23	N/A	N/A	N/A
2013/14	7	N/A	N/A	N/A
2014/15	14	N/A	N/A	N/A
2015/16	6	N/A	N/A	N/A
2016/17	3rd place, bronze medalist(s)	N/A	N/A	N/A
2017/18	1st place, gold medalist(s)	2nd place, silver medalist(s)	N/A	N/A
2018/19	1st place, gold medalist(s)	6	1st place, gold medalist(s)	2nd place, silver medalist(s)
2019/20	1st place, gold medalist(s)	N/A	1st place, gold medalist(s)	N/A
2020/21	8	N/A	N/A	—
2022/23	20	N/A	10	N/A

=== Individual wins ===
No.	Season	Date	Location	Hill	Size
1	2016/17	10 December 2016	(Russia) Nizhny Tagil	Tramplin Stork HS100 (night)	NH
2	2016/17	15 January 2017	(Japan) Sapporo	Miyanomori HS100	NH
3	2016/17	28 January 2017	(Romania) Râșnov	Trambulina Valea Cărbunării HS100	NH
4	2016/17	11 February 2017	(Slovenia) Ljubno	Savina Ski Jumping Center HS95	NH
5	2017/18	1 December 2017	(Norway) Lillehammer	Lysgårdsbakken HS98 (night)	NH
6	2017/18	17 December 2017	(Germany) Hinterzarten	Rothaus-Schanze HS108	NH
7	2017/18	13 January 2018	(Japan) Sapporo	Miyanomori HS100	NH
8	2017/18	14 January 2018	(Japan) Sapporo	Miyanomori HS100	NH
9	2017/18	19 January 2018	(Japan) Zaō	Yamagata HS102 (night)	NH
10	2017/18	20 January 2018	(Japan) Zaō	Yamagata HS102 (night)	NH
11	2017/18	27 January 2018	(Slovenia) Ljubno	Savina Ski Jumping Center HS94	NH
12	2017/18	4 March 2018	(Romania) Râșnov	Trambulina Valea Cărbunării HS97	NH
13	2017/18	11 March 2018	(Norway) Oslo	Holmenkollbakken HS134	LH
14	2018/19	13 January 2019	(Japan) Sapporo	Ōkurayama HS137	LH
15	2018/19	20 January 2019	(Japan) Zaō	Yamagata HS102 (night)	NH
16	2018/19	26 January 2019	(Romania) Râșnov	Trambulina Valea Cărbunării HS97	NH
17	2018/19	27 January 2019	(Romania) Râșnov	Trambulina Valea Cărbunării HS97	NH
18	2018/19	2 February 2019	(Austria) Hinzenbach	Aigner-Schanze HS90	NH
19	2018/19	3 February 2019	(Austria) Hinzenbach	Aigner-Schanze HS90	NH
20	2018/19	8 February 2019	(Slovenia) Ljubno	Savina Ski Jumping Center HS94	NH
21	2018/19	16 February 2019	(Germany) Oberstdorf	Schattenbergschanze HS137	LH
22	2018/19	17 February 2019	(Germany) Oberstdorf	Schattenbergschanze HS137	LH
23	2018/19	12 March 2019	(Norway) Lillehammer	Lysgårdsbakken HS140	LH
24	2018/19	14 March 2019	(Norway) Trondheim	Granåsen HS138	LH
25	2018/19	24 March 2019	(Russia) Chaykovsky	Snezhinka HS140	LH
26	2019/20	7 December 2019	(Norway) Lillehammer	Lysgårdsbakken HS140	LH
27	2019/20	8 December 2019	(Norway) Lillehammer	Lysgårdsbakken HS140	LH
28	2019/20	26 January 2020	(Romania) Râșnov	Trambulina Valea Cărbunării HS97	NH
29	2019/20	23 February 2020	(Slovenia) Ljubno	Savina Ski Jumping Center HS94	NH
30	2019/20	11 March 2020	(Norway) Lillehammer	Lysgårdsbakken HS140	LH
