= Jacqueline Seifriedsberger =

Austrian ski jumper (born 1991)

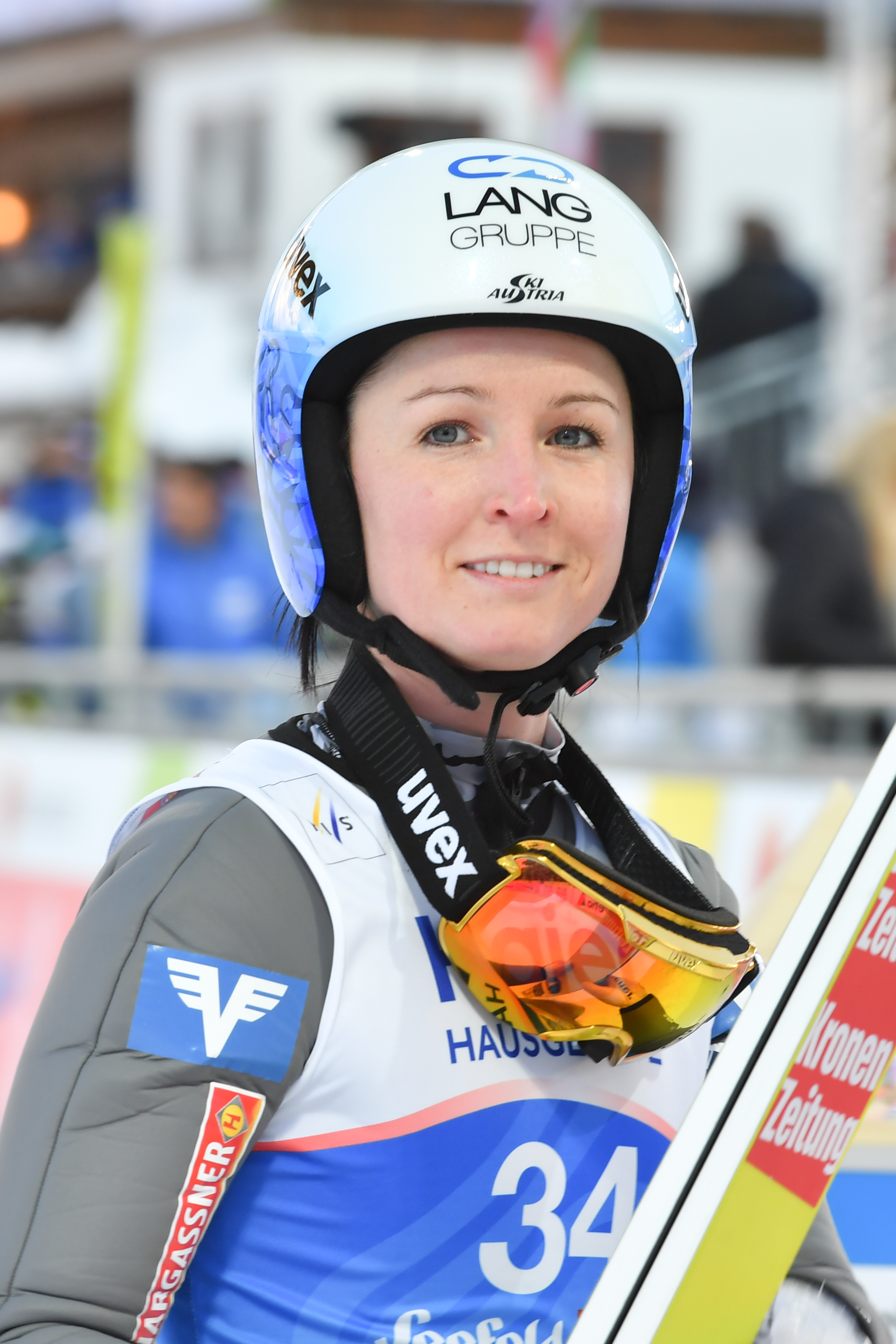

Personal information
- Nationality: Austria
- Born: 20 January 1991 (age 35) Ried im Innkreis, Austria
- Height: 1.59 m (5 ft 3 in)

Sport
- Sport: Skiing
- Club: SC Waldzell

World Cup career
- Seasons: 2012–present
- Indiv. starts: 196
- Indiv. podiums: 21
- Indiv. wins: 3
- Team starts: 9
- Team podiums: 6
- Team wins: 1

Achievements and titles
- Personal bests: 191.5 m (628 ft); Vikersund, 17 March 2024
Medal record
Women's ski jumping
Representing Austria
World Championships
Silver medal – second place	2013 Val di Fiemme	Mixed team NH
Silver medal – second place	2017 Lahti	Mixed team NH
Silver medal – second place	2019 Seefeld	Team NH
Silver medal – second place	2023 Planica	Team NH
Silver medal – second place	2025 Trondheim	Team NH
Bronze medal – third place	2013 Val di Flemme	Individual NH
Bronze medal – third place	2025 Trondheim	Mixed team LH
European Games
Gold medal – first place	2023 Kraków–Małopolska	Individual NH
Gold medal – first place	2023 Kraków–Małopolska	Mixed team NH
- Updated on 26 January 2025

Jacqueline "Jaci" Seifriedsberger (born 20 January 1991) is an Austrian ski jumper.

She represents SC Waldzell club. She was selected to compete for Austria in the 2009 World Championship and 2011 World Championship in Oslo. She also won a gold medal on normal hill at 2008 FIS Junior World Championships in Zakopane. She has won two World Cup events in her career one in Sapporo and one in Willingen.

== Career ==
Jacqueline Seifriedsberger started ski jumping in 1995. On 23 July 2004, she debuted at the Ski Jumping Continental Cup in Park City.

She reached her first podium in Yamagata on 1 March 2006.

On 3 February 2013, Jacqueline Seifriedsberger won her first World Cup competition in Sapporo after finishing second the day before.

At the Nordic World Ski Championships 2013 in Val di Fiemme she won the bronze medal in the individual competition. With her teammates Chiara Hölzl, Gregor Schlierenzauer and Thomas Morgenstern, she won the silver medal in the mixed competition.

Jacqueline Seifriedsberger missed the Winter Olympic Games 2014 in Sochi due to a knee injury obtained during training in Hinterzarten.

At the Nordic World Ski Championships 2017 in Lahti, she won her second silver medal in the mixed competition after 2013; this time together with her teammates Daniela Iraschko-Stolz, Michael Hayböck and Stefan Kraft.

In 2018, she competed for the first time at the Winter Olympic Games in Pyeongchang. She finished thirteenth in the individual competition.

== World Cup ==
=== Standings ===
Season	Overall	ST	AK	L3	RA	BB
2011/12	11	N/A	N/A	N/A	N/A	N/A
2012/13	4	N/A	N/A	N/A	N/A	N/A
2013/14	41	N/A	N/A	N/A	N/A	N/A
2014/15	9	N/A	N/A	N/A	N/A	N/A
2015/16	4	N/A	N/A	N/A	N/A	N/A
2016/17	8	N/A	N/A	N/A	N/A	N/A
2017/18	15	N/A	N/A	17	N/A	N/A
2018/19	17	N/A	N/A	27	23	7
2019/20	14	N/A	N/A	N/A	14	N/A
2021/22	10	15	15	N/A	10	N/A
2022/23	21	26	N/A	N/A	24	N/A
2023/24	5	N/A	N/A	N/A	8	N/A

=== Wins ===
No.	Season	Date	Location	Hill	Size
1	2012/13	3 February 2013	(Japan) Sapporo	Miyanomori HS100	NH
2	2023/24	3 February 2024	(Germany) Willingen	Mühlenkopfschanze HS147	LH
3	2024/25	26 January 2025	(Japan) Zaō	Yamagata HS102	NH
