= Ingebjørg Saglien Bråten =

Norwegian ski jumper

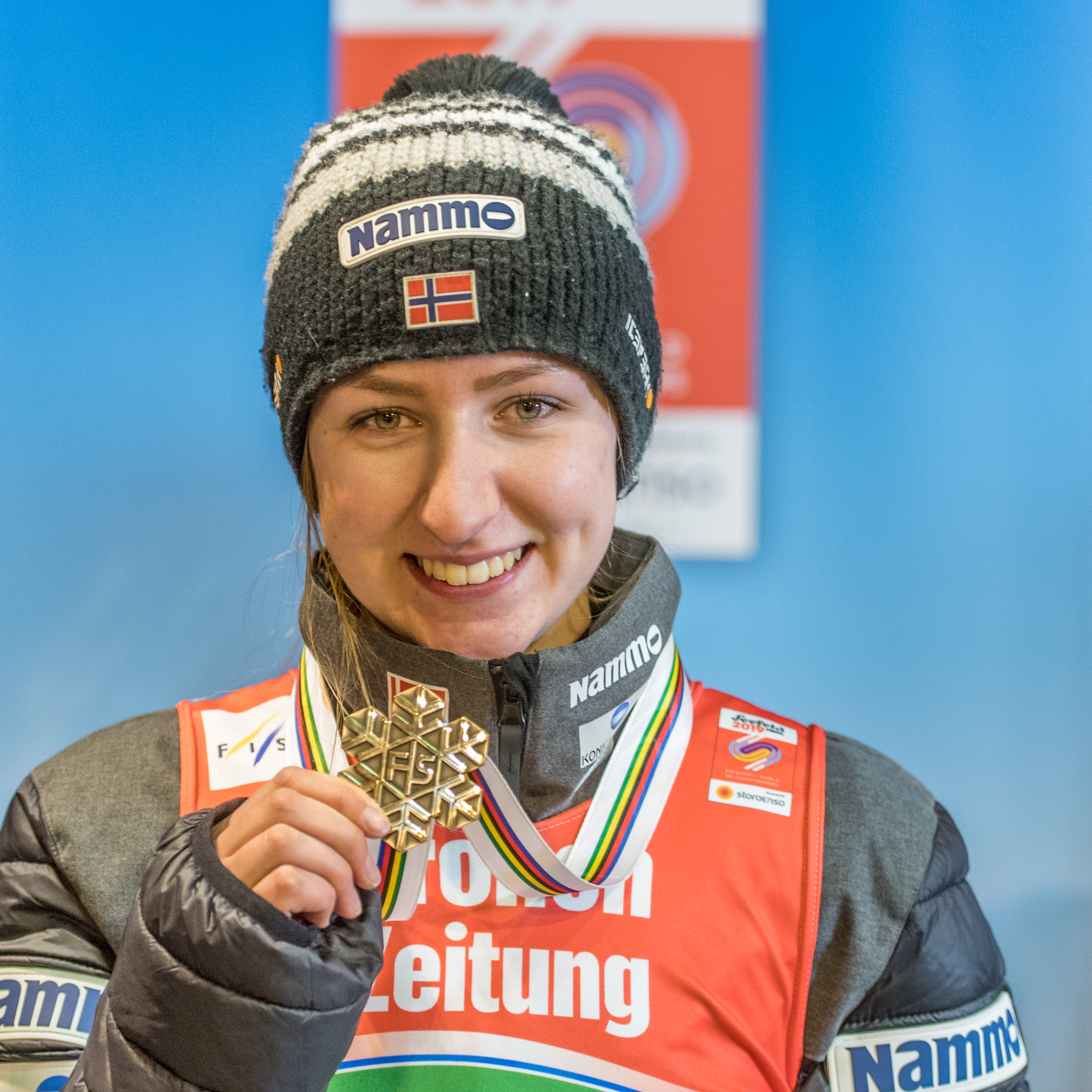

Personal information
- Nationality: Norway
- Born: 20 September 1999 (age 26)

Sport
- Sport: Skiing
- Club: Etnedal SL

World Cup career
- Seasons: 2019–present
Medal record
World Championships
Bronze medal – third place	2019 Seefeld	Team NH
- Updated on 26 February 2019

Ingebjørg Saglien Bråten (born 20 September 1999) is a Norwegian ski jumper.

She participated at the FIS Nordic World Ski Championships 2019, winning a bronze medal in the team competition.
