= FIS Nordic World Ski Championships 2019 =

2019 edition of the FIS Nordic World Ski Championships

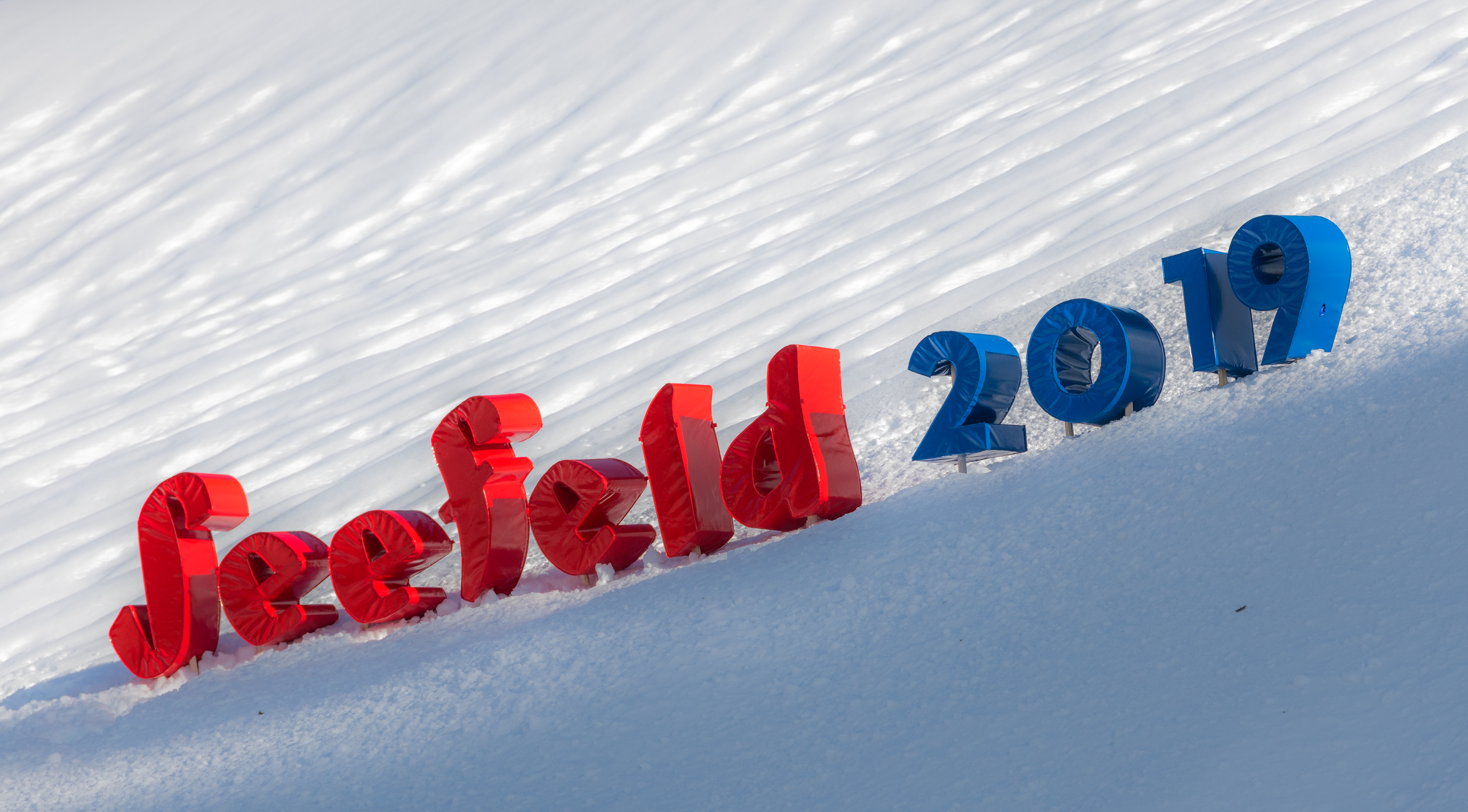
- Host city: Seefeld in Tirol, Tyrol
- Country: Austria
- Events: 22
- Opening: 20 February 2019
- Closing: 3 March 2019

The 41st FIS Nordic World Ski Championships were held from 20 February to 3 March 2019 in Seefeld in Tirol, Tyrol, Austria. It was the second time Seefeld in Tirol hosted the world championships, the event having been hosted there previously in 1985.

== Host selection ==
Championships was awarded to Seefeld in Tirol in Tyrol in Austria during the FIS Congress from 1–6 June 2014 in Barcelona, Spain.

Finalist applicants were Seefeld in Tirol (Austria), Oberstdorf (Germany), Planica (Slovenia) and Almaty (Kazakhstan). Oberstdorf had already applied for 2013, 2015 and 2017, Planica for 2017. Seefeld submitted its candidacy shortly before the deadline.

The Austrian winter sports resort had hosted the Championships in 1985, the German resort of Oberstdorf in 1987 and 2005.

Detailed application concepts were to be submitted by 1 September 2013.

City	Country	Previous championships hosted	Recent bids
Seefeld in Tirol	Austria	1985	–
Oberstdorf	Germany	1987, 2005	3rd (2017), 4th (2015), 5th (2013)
Planica	Slovenia		2nd (2017)
Almaty	Kazakhstan		–

City	First vote	Second vote	Third vote
Seefeld in Tirol	6	6	9
Oberstdorf	8	8	8
Planica	3	3	Out
Almaty	0	Out	Out

== Schedule ==
All times are local (UTC+1).

Cross-country

Date	Time	Event
20 February	12:30	Women's 10 km classical qualification
20 February	14:00	Men's 15 km classical qualification
21 February	14:30	Men's & women's sprint
23 February	11:00	Women's 2 × 7.5 km skiathlon
23 February	12:30	Men's 2 × 15 km skiathlon
24 February	09:15	Men's & women's team sprint
26 February	15:00	Women's 10 km classical
27 February	14:00	Men's 15 km classical
28 February	13:00	Women's 4 × 5 km relay
1 March	13:15	Men's 4 × 10 km relay
2 March	12:15	Women's 30 km freestyle
3 March	15:30	Men's 50 km freestyle

Nordic combined

Date	Time	Event
22 February	10:30; 16:15	HS130 / 10 km
24 February	10:30; 13:30	Team HS130 / 2 × 7.5 km
28 February	11:00; 15:15	HS109 / 10 km
2 March	11:00; 14:45	Team HS109 / 4 × 5 km

Ski jumping

Date	Time	Event
22 February	14:30	Men's HS130 qualification
23 February	14:30	Men's HS130
24 February	14:45	Men's team HS130
26 February	16:15	Women's team HS109
27 February	15:00	Women's HS109 qualification
27 February	16:15	Women's HS109
28 February	16:30	Men's HS109 qualification
1 March	16:00	Men's HS109
2 March	16:00	Team mixed HS109

== Medal summary ==
=== Medal table ===
* Host nation (Austria)

Rank	Nation	Gold	Silver	Bronze	Total
1	Norway (NOR)	13	5	7	25
2	Germany (GER)	6	3	0	9
3	Sweden (SWE)	2	2	1	5
4	Poland (POL)	1	1	0	2
5	Russia (RUS)	0	5	3	8
6	Austria (AUT)*	0	4	4	8
7	Italy (ITA)	0	1	1	2
8	Slovenia (SLO)	0	1	0	1
9	Japan (JPN)	0	0	3	3
10	Finland (FIN)	0	0	1	1
10	France (FRA)	0	0	1	1
10	Switzerland (SUI)	0	0	1	1
Totals (12 entries)		22	22	22	66

=== Cross-country skiing ===
==== Men ====
Event	Gold		Silver		Bronze	
Sprint	Johannes Høsflot Klæbo; Norway	3:21.17	Federico Pellegrino; Italy	3:21.40	Gleb Retivykh; Russia	3:22.54
30 kilometre skiathlon	Sjur Røthe; Norway	1:10:21.8	Alexander Bolshunov; Russia	1:10:21.9	Martin Johnsrud Sundby; Norway	1:10:22.5
Team sprint	Norway; Emil Iversen; Johannes Høsflot Klæbo	18:49.86	Russia; Gleb Retivykh; Alexander Bolshunov	18:51.74	Italy; Francesco De Fabiani; Federico Pellegrino	18:53.89
15 kilometre classical	Martin Johnsrud Sundby; Norway	38:22.6	Alexander Bessmertnykh; Russia	38:25.5	Iivo Niskanen; Finland	38:43.0
4 × 10 kilometre relay	Norway; Emil Iversen; Martin Johnsrud Sundby; Sjur Røthe; Johannes Høsflot Klæbo	1:42:32.1	Russia; Andrey Larkov; Alexander Bessmertnykh; Alexander Bolshunov; Sergey Ustiugov	1:43:10.9	France; Adrien Backscheider; Maurice Manificat; Clément Parisse; Richard Jouve	1:43:33.1
50 kilometre freestyle mass start	Hans Christer Holund; Norway	1:49:59.3	Alexander Bolshunov; Russia	1:50:27.1	Sjur Røthe; Norway	1:50:57.1

==== Women ====
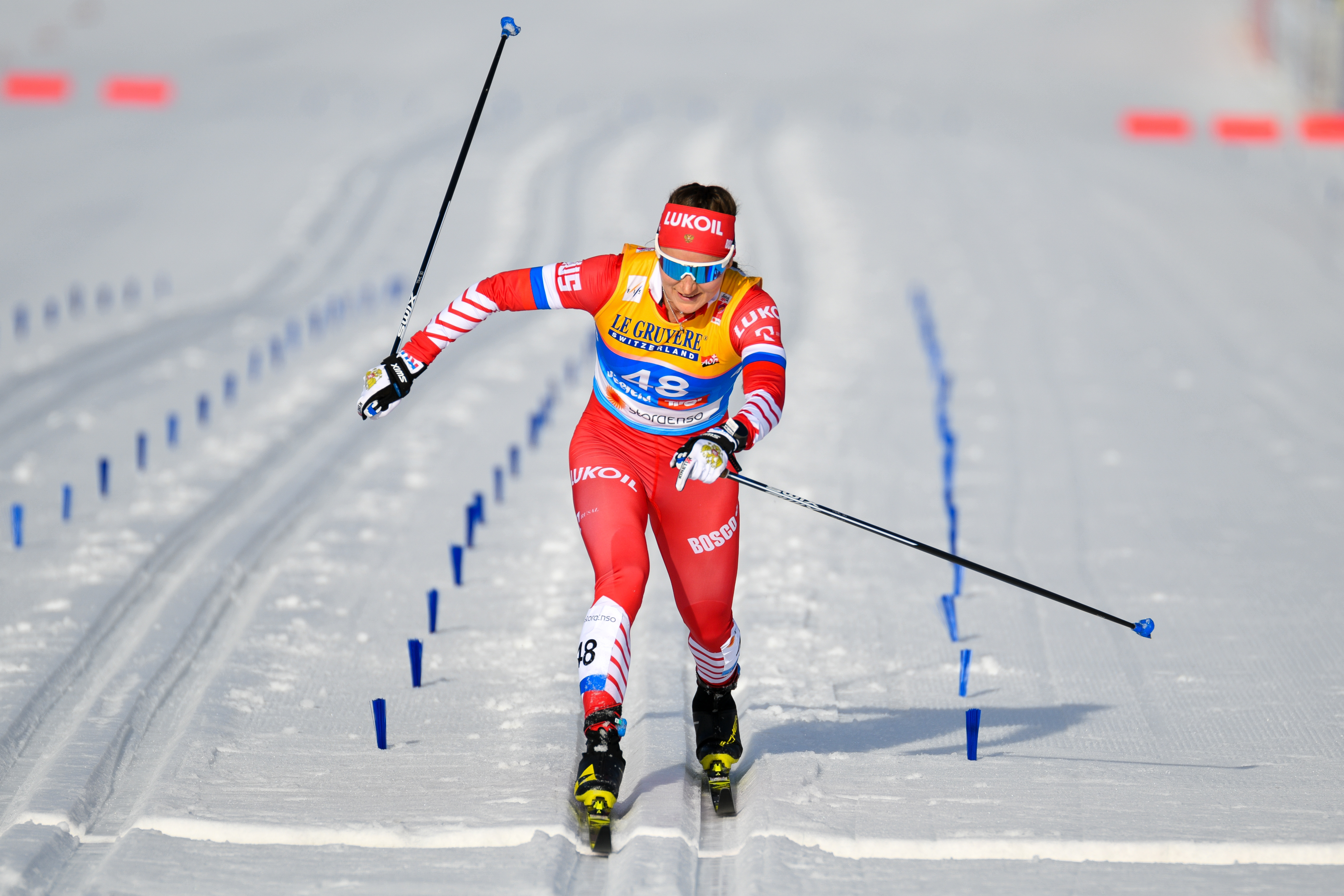
Yulia Stupak

Event	Gold		Silver		Bronze	
Sprint	Maiken Caspersen Falla; Norway	2:32.35	Stina Nilsson; Sweden	2:34.01	Mari Eide; Norway	2:35.19
15 kilometre skiathlon	Therese Johaug; Norway	36:54.5	Ingvild Flugstad Østberg; Norway	37:52.1	Natalya Nepryayeva; Russia	37:53.2
Team sprint	Sweden; Stina Nilsson; Maja Dahlqvist	15:14.93	Slovenia; Katja Višnar; Anamarija Lampič	15:15.30	Norway; Ingvild Flugstad Østberg; Maiken Caspersen Falla	15:15.53
10 kilometre classical	Therese Johaug; Norway	27:02.1	Frida Karlsson; Sweden	27:14.3	Ingvild Flugstad Østberg; Norway	27:37.7
4 × 5 kilometre relay	Sweden; Ebba Andersson; Frida Karlsson; Charlotte Kalla; Stina Nilsson	55:21.0	Norway; Heidi Weng; Ingvild Flugstad Østberg; Astrid Uhrenholdt Jacobsen; Therese Johaug	55:24.1	Russia; Yuliya Belorukova; Anastasia Sedova; Anna Nechaevskaya; Natalya Nepryaeva	57:24.8
30 kilometre freestyle mass start	Therese Johaug; Norway	1:14:26.2	Ingvild Flugstad Østberg; Norway	1:15:03.0	Frida Karlsson; Sweden	1:15:10.2

=== Nordic combined ===
Event	Gold		Silver		Bronze	
Individual large hill/10 km	Eric Frenzel; Germany	23:43.0	Jan Schmid; Norway	23:47.3	Franz-Josef Rehrl; Austria	23:51.7
Team sprint large hill/2 × 7,5 km	Germany; Eric Frenzel; Fabian Rießle	28:29.5	Norway; Jan Schmid; Jarl Magnus Riiber	28:37.7	Austria; Franz-Josef Rehrl; Bernhard Gruber	28:38.7
Individual normal hill/10 km	Jarl Magnus Riiber; Norway	25:01.3	Bernhard Gruber; Austria	25:02.7	Akito Watabe; Japan	25:05.9
Team normal hill/4 × 5 km	Norway; Espen Bjørnstad; Jan Schmid; Jørgen Graabak; Jarl Magnus Riiber	50:15.5	Germany; Johannes Rydzek; Eric Frenzel; Fabian Rießle; Vinzenz Geiger	50:16.5	Japan; Gō Yamamoto; Yoshito Watabe; Hideaki Nagai; Akito Watabe	50:44.2

=== Ski jumping ===
==== Men ====
Event	Gold		Silver		Bronze	
Men's individual large hill	Markus Eisenbichler; Germany	279.4	Karl Geiger; Germany	267.3	Killian Peier; Switzerland	266.1
Men's team large hill	Germany; Karl Geiger; Richard Freitag; Stephan Leyhe; Markus Eisenbichler	987.5	Austria; Philipp Aschenwald; Michael Hayböck; Daniel Huber; Stefan Kraft	930.9	Japan; Yukiya Satō; Daiki Itō; Junshirō Kobayashi; Ryōyū Kobayashi	920.2
Men's individual normal hill	Dawid Kubacki; Poland	218.3	Kamil Stoch; Poland	215.5	Stefan Kraft; Austria	214.8

==== Women ====
Event	Gold		Silver		Bronze	
Women's team normal hill	Germany; Juliane Seyfarth; Ramona Straub; Carina Vogt; Katharina Althaus	898.9	Austria; Eva Pinkelnig; Jacqueline Seifriedsberger; Chiara Hölzl; Daniela Iraschko-Stolz	880.3	Norway; Anna Odine Strøm; Ingebjørg Saglien Bråten; Silje Opseth; Maren Lundby	876.9
Women's individual normal hill	Maren Lundby; Norway	259.6	Katharina Althaus; Germany	259.1	Daniela Iraschko-Stolz; Austria	247.6

==== Mixed ====
Event	Gold		Silver		Bronze	
Mixed team normal hill	Germany; Katharina Althaus; Markus Eisenbichler; Juliane Seyfarth; Karl Geiger	1012.2	Austria; Eva Pinkelnig; Philipp Aschenwald; Daniela Iraschko-Stolz; Stefan Kraft	989.9	Norway; Anna Odine Strøm; Robert Johansson; Maren Lundby; Andreas Stjernen	938.4

== Venues ==
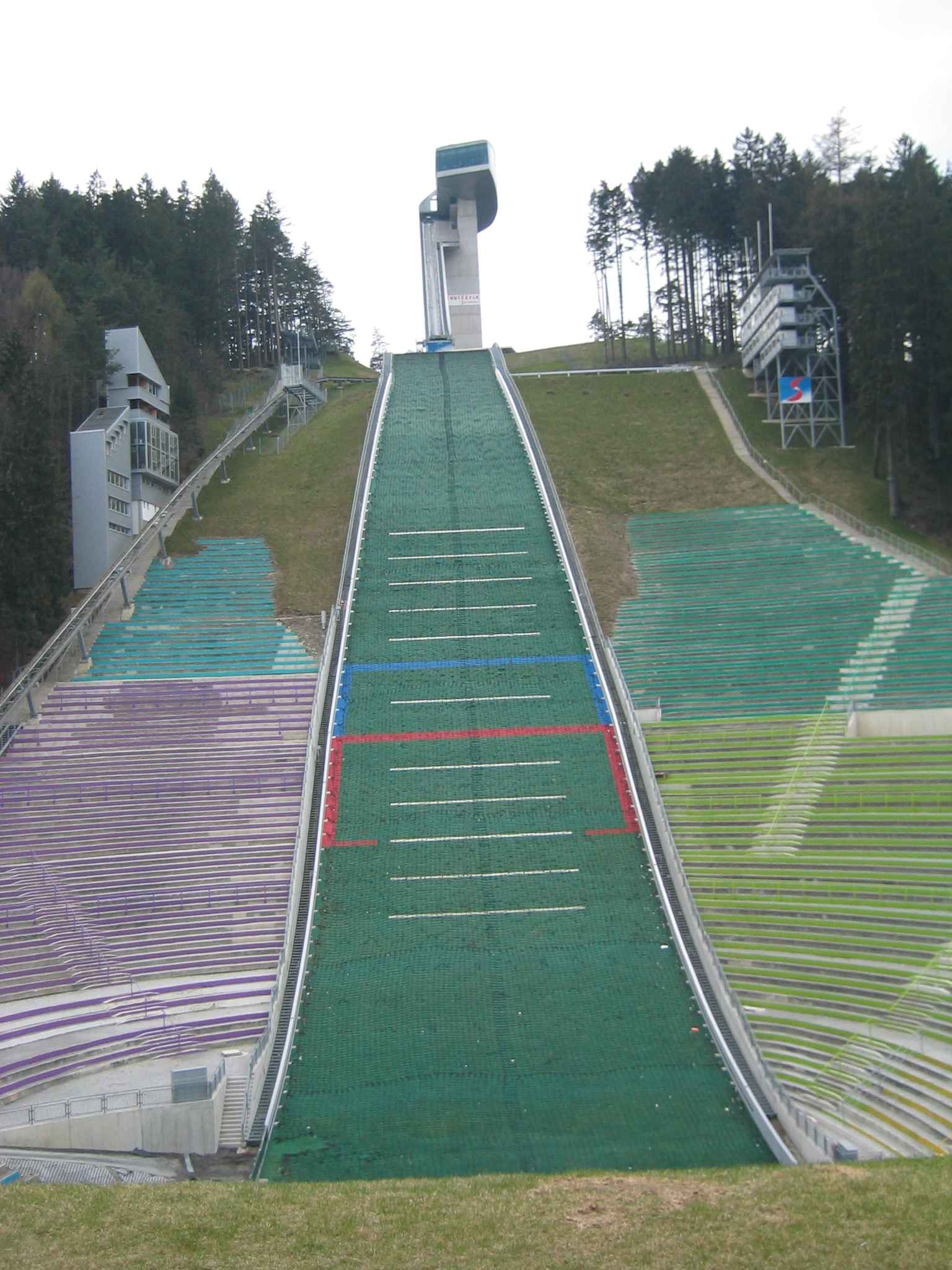
Bergisel Ski Jump in Innsbruck

The cross-country skiing events took place at the Seefeld Nordic Competence Centre. The ski jumping large hill events were held in the Bergisel Ski Jump in Innsbruck. The Bergisel Ski Jump is a large ski jumping hill with a hill size of 130 and a construction point (K-spot) of 120. It has a spectator capacity of 26,000. The current structure dates from 2003. The normal hill competitions were held in the Toni-Seelos-Olympiaschanze normal hill with a hill size of 109 and a K-point of 99.

Medal ceremonies were held at the Medal Plaza, a square in the town center.

== Doping ==
Five cross-country skiers (Max Hauke and Dominik Baldauf from Austria, Andreas Veerpalu and Karel Tammjärv from Estonia, as well as Alexey Poltoranin from Kazakhstan.) were caught during Operation Aderlass.
