= 2021–22 FIS Ski Jumping World Cup =

Discipline	Men	Women
Overall	(Japan) Ryōyū Kobayashi	(Austria) Marita Kramer
Nations Cup	Austria	Slovenia
Ski flying	(Slovenia) Žiga Jelar	—

Stage events
Raw Air	(Austria) Stefan Kraft	(Slovenia) Nika Križnar
Four Hills Tournament	(Japan) Ryōyū Kobayashi	—
Planica7	(Slovenia) Timi Zajc	—
Silvester Tournament	—	(Austria) Marita Kramer
Alpenkrone	—	(Slovenia) Nika Križnar
Russia Tour Blue Bird	—	cancelled

Competition
Edition	43rd	11th
Locations	16	10
Individual	28	19
Team	5	1
Mixed	2	2
Cancelled	4	8
Rescheduled	4	1

The 2021–22 FIS Ski Jumping World Cup was the 43rd World Cup season in ski jumping for men, the 25th official World Cup season in ski flying, and the 11th World Cup season for women. The men's season started in November 2021 in Nizhny Tagil, Russia and concluded in March 2022 in Planica, Slovenia. The women's season started in December 2021 in Lillehammer, Norway and was expected to conclude in March 2022 in Chaykovsky, Russia. However, because of the Russian invasion of Ukraine, the women's season concluded in Oberhof, Germany.

Halvor Egner Granerud (men's) and Nika Križnar (women's) were the defending overall champions from the previous season.

== Season overview ==
The first edition of the Silvester Tournament (women's version of the Four Hills Tournament) was held with two knockout events from 31 December 2021 to 1 January 2022 in Ljubno, Slovenia. The Alpenkrone Tournament – consisting of one competition in Ramsau and two in Hinzenbach – also made its debut in the women's competition.

Fatih Arda İpcioğlu became the first Turkish ski jumper in history of World Cup who managed to qualify to the main competition at the season opener in Nizhny Tagil.

On 26 November 2021, Marita Kramer won the individual competition with the biggest ever lead over the second-placed athlete (Ema Klinec) in the history of the Women's World Cup with 41.7 points.

For the first time since the 1983–84 season, six different athletes won the first six men's individual competitions.

After the competition in Innsbruck was cancelled, the Four Hills Tournament was held only on three hills; this has only happened once before in the tournament's 70-year history, in the 2007–08 season.

On 1 March 2022, following the 2022 Russian invasion of Ukraine, the International Ski Federation (FIS) decided to exclude athletes from Russia and Belarus from FIS competitions, with an immediate effect.

== Map of World Cup hosts ==
(Poland) Wisła	(Finland) Kuusamo	(Germany) Titisee-Neustadt	(Switzerland) Engelberg	(Germany) Oberstdorf
Malinka	Rukatunturi	Hochfirstschanze	Gross-Titlis-Schanze	Schattenberg
(Austria) Innsbruck	(Austria) Bischofshofen	(Poland) Zakopane	(Germany) Willingen	(Germany) Garmisch-Pa
Bergiselschanze	Paul-Ausserleitner	Wielka Krokiew	Mühlenkopfschanze	Große Olympiaschanze
(Romania) Râșnov	(Norway) Oslo	(Norway) Lillehammer	(Finland) Lahti	(Russia) Tramplin Stork
Trambulina Valea	Holmenkollbakken	Lysgårdsbakken	Salpausselkä	Tramplin Stork
(Slovenia) Planica	(Austria) Ramsau	(Slovenia) Ljubno ob Savinji	(Germany) Hinterzarten	(Austria) Hinzenbach
Letalnica bratov Gorišek	Mattensprunganlage	Savina	Adler Ski Stadium	Aigner-Schanze
Europe
Germany			Austria Asia	

== Men's Individual ==
=== Calendar ===
N – normal hill / L – large hill / F – flying hill
Num	#	Date	Place (Hill)	Event	Winner	Second	Third	Overall leader	R.
1028	1	20 November 2021	(Russia) Nizhny Tagil (Tramplin Stork HS134)	L _{739}	(Germany) Karl Geiger	(Japan) Ryōyū Kobayashi	(Norway) Halvor Egner Granerud	(Germany) Karl Geiger	
1029	2	21 November 2021	(Russia) Nizhny Tagil (Tramplin Stork HS134)	L _{740}	(Norway) Halvor Egner Granerud	(Germany) Karl Geiger	(Austria) Stefan Kraft	(Germany) Karl Geiger	
1030	3	27 November 2021	(Finland) Ruka (Rukatunturi HS142)	L _{741}	(Japan) Ryōyū Kobayashi	(Slovenia) Anže Lanišek	(Germany) Markus Eisenbichler	(Germany) Karl Geiger	
1031	4	28 November 2021	(Finland) Ruka (Rukatunturi HS142)	L _{742}	(Slovenia) Anže Lanišek	(Germany) Karl Geiger	(Germany) Markus Eisenbichler	(Germany) Karl Geiger	
1032	5	5 December 2021	(Poland) Wisła (Malinka HS134)	L _{743}	(Austria) Jan Hörl	(Norway) Marius Lindvik	(Austria) Stefan Kraft	(Germany) Karl Geiger	
1033	6	11 December 2021	(Germany) Klingenthal (Vogtland Arena HS140)	L _{744}	(Austria) Stefan Kraft	(Norway) Halvor Egner Granerud	(Poland) Kamil Stoch	(Germany) Karl Geiger	
1034	7	12 December 2021	(Germany) Klingenthal (Vogtland Arena HS140)	L _{745}	(Japan) Ryōyū Kobayashi	(Norway) Daniel Andre Tande	(Norway) Marius Lindvik	(Germany) Karl Geiger	
1035	8	18 December 2021	(Switzerland) Engelberg (Gross-Titlis-Schanze HS140)	L _{746}	(Germany) Karl Geiger	(Japan) Ryōyū Kobayashi	(Slovenia) Timi Zajc	(Germany) Karl Geiger	
1036	9	19 December 2021	(Switzerland) Engelberg (Gross-Titlis-Schanze HS140)	L _{747}	(Japan) Ryōyū Kobayashi	(Germany) Karl Geiger	(Norway) Marius Lindvik	(Germany) Karl Geiger	
1037	10	29 December 2021	(Germany) Oberstdorf (Schattenbergschanze HS137)	L _{748}	(Japan) Ryōyū Kobayashi	(Norway) Halvor Egner Granerud	(Norway) Robert Johansson	(Germany) Karl Geiger	
1038	11	1 January 2022	(Germany) Garmisch-Pa (Gr. Olympiaschanze HS142)	L _{749}	(Japan) Ryōyū Kobayashi	(Germany) Markus Eisenbichler	(Slovenia) Lovro Kos	(Japan) Ryōyū Kobayashi	
		4 January 2022	(Austria) Innsbruck (Bergiselschanze HS128)	L _{cnx}	cancelled due to strong wind, moved to Bischofshofen on 5 January			—	
1039	12	5 January 2022 (Note: Men's cancelled competition in Innsbruck was moved to Bischofshofen.)	(Austria) Bischofshofen (Paul-Ausserleitner HS142)	L _{750}	(Japan) Ryōyū Kobayashi	(Norway) Marius Lindvik	(Norway) Halvor Egner Granerud	(Japan) Ryōyū Kobayashi	
1040	13	6 January 2022	(Austria) Bischofshofen (Paul-Ausserleitner HS142)	L _{751}	(Austria) Daniel Huber	(Norway) Halvor Egner Granerud	(Germany) Karl Geiger	(Japan) Ryōyū Kobayashi	
70th Four Hills Tournament Overall (28 December 2021 – 6 January 2022)					(Japan) Ryōyū Kobayashi	(Norway) Marius Lindvik	(Norway) Halvor Egner Granerud	4H Tournament	
1041	14	8 January 2022	(Austria) Bischofshofen (Paul-Ausserleitner HS142)	L _{752}	(Norway) Marius Lindvik	(Norway) Halvor Egner Granerud	(Austria) Jan Hörl	(Japan) Ryōyū Kobayashi	
1042	15	16 January 2022	(Poland) Zakopane (Wielka Krokiew HS140)	L _{753}	(Norway) Marius Lindvik	(Germany) Karl Geiger	(Slovenia) Anže Lanišek	(Japan) Ryōyū Kobayashi	
		21 January 2022	(Japan) Sapporo (Ōkurayama HS137)	L _{cnx}	cancelled due to the COVID-19 pandemic; two events replaced in Titisee-Neustadt on 22 and 23 January, one in Lahti on 25 February			—	
		22 January 2022	(Japan) Sapporo (Ōkurayama HS137)	L _{cnx}	cancelled due to the COVID-19 pandemic; two events replaced in Titisee-Neustadt on 22 and 23 January, one in Lahti on 25 February			—	
		23 January 2022	(Japan) Sapporo (Ōkurayama HS137)	L _{cnx}	cancelled due to the COVID-19 pandemic; two events replaced in Titisee-Neustadt on 22 and 23 January, one in Lahti on 25 February			—	
1043	16	22 January 2022	(Germany) Titisee-Neustadt (Note: Two men's cancelled competitions in Sapporo were moved to Titisee-Neustadt.) (Hochfirstschanze HS142)	L _{754}	(Germany) Karl Geiger	(Slovenia) Anže Lanišek	(Germany) Markus Eisenbichler	(Germany) Karl Geiger	
1044	17	23 January 2022	(Germany) Titisee-Neustadt (Hochfirstschanze HS142)	L _{755}	(Germany) Karl Geiger	(Slovenia) Anže Lanišek	(Germany) Markus Eisenbichler	(Germany) Karl Geiger	
1045	18	29 January 2022 (Note: One round only due to strong wind.)	(Germany) Willingen (Mühlenkopfschanze HS147)	L _{756}	(Japan) Ryōyū Kobayashi	(Norway) Halvor Egner Granerud	(Norway) Marius Lindvik	(Japan) Ryōyū Kobayashi	
1046	19	30 January 2022	(Germany) Willingen (Mühlenkopfschanze HS147)	L _{757}	(Norway) Marius Lindvik	(Germany) Karl Geiger	(Slovenia) Cene Prevc	(Germany) Karl Geiger	
2022 Winter Olympics (6 – 12 February • (China) Zhangjiakou)
1047	20	25 February 2022 (Note: One men's cancelled competition in Sapporo was moved to Lahti.)	(Finland) Lahti (Salpausselkä HS130)	L _{758}	(Austria) Stefan Kraft	(Norway) Halvor Egner Granerud	(Poland) Piotr Żyła	(Germany) Karl Geiger	
1048	21	27 February 2022	(Finland) Lahti (Salpausselkä HS130)	L _{759}	(Japan) Ryōyū Kobayashi (Norway) Halvor Egner Granerud		(Austria) Stefan Kraft	(Japan) Ryōyū Kobayashi	
prologue		2 March 2022	(Norway) Lillehammer (Lysgårdsbakken HS140)	L _{Qro}	(Norway) Johann André Forfang	(Austria) Stefan Kraft	(Austria) Manuel Fettner	—	
1049	22	3 March 2022	(Norway) Lillehammer (Lysgårdsbakken HS140)	L _{760}	(Austria) Stefan Kraft	(Japan) Ryōyū Kobayashi	(Germany) Karl Geiger	(Japan) Ryōyū Kobayashi	
prologue		5 March 2022	(Norway) Oslo (Holmenkollbakken HS134)	L _{Qro}	(Poland) Kamil Stoch	(Norway) Marius Lindvik	(Austria) Stefan Kraft (Norway) Robert Johansson	—	
1050	23	5 March 2022	(Norway) Oslo (Holmenkollbakken HS134)	L _{761}	(Norway) Marius Lindvik	(Germany) Markus Eisenbichler	(Norway) Robert Johansson	(Japan) Ryōyū Kobayashi	
prologue		6 March 2022	(Norway) Oslo (Holmenkollbakken HS134)	L _{Qro}	(Germany) Karl Geiger	(Austria) Stefan Kraft	(Austria) Clemens Aigner	—	
1051	24	6 March 2022	(Norway) Oslo (Holmenkollbakken HS134)	L _{762}	(Norway) Daniel-André Tande	(Slovenia) Anže Lanišek	(Austria) Stefan Kraft	(Japan) Ryōyū Kobayashi	
5th Raw Air Overall (2 – 6 March 2022)					(Austria) Stefan Kraft	(Germany) Karl Geiger	(Japan) Ryōyū Kobayashi	Raw Air	
FIS Ski Flying World Championships 2022 (11 – 12 March • (Norway) Vikersund)
1052	25	19 March 2022	(Germany) Oberstdorf (Heini-Klopfer HS235)	F _{131}	(Austria) Stefan Kraft	(Slovenia) Žiga Jelar	(Slovenia) Timi Zajc	(Japan) Ryōyū Kobayashi	
1053	26	20 March 2022	(Germany) Oberstdorf (Heini-Klopfer HS235)	F _{132}	(Slovenia) Timi Zajc	(Poland) Piotr Żyła	(Austria) Stefan Kraft	(Japan) Ryōyū Kobayashi	
qualifying		24 March 2022	(Slovenia) Planica (Letalnica b. Gorišek HS240)	F _{Qro}	(Slovenia) Anže Lanišek	(Slovenia) Timi Zajc	(Norway) Johann André Forfang	—	
1054	27	25 March 2022	(Slovenia) Planica (Letalnica b. Gorišek HS240)	F _{133}	(Slovenia) Žiga Jelar	(Slovenia) Peter Prevc	(Slovenia) Anže Lanišek	(Japan) Ryōyū Kobayashi	
team		26 March 2022	(Slovenia) Planica (Letalnica b. Gorišek HS240)	F _{Tev}	(Norway) Marius Lindvik	(Slovenia) Timi Zajc	(Austria) Stefan Kraft	—	
1055	28	27 March 2022	(Slovenia) Planica (Letalnica b. Gorišek HS240)	F _{134}	(Norway) Marius Lindvik	(Japan) Yukiya Satō	(Slovenia) Peter Prevc	(Japan) Ryōyū Kobayashi	
4th Planica7 Overall (24 – 27 March 2022)					(Slovenia) Timi Zajc	(Norway) Marius Lindvik	(Slovenia) Peter Prevc	Planica7	

=== Standings ===
==== Overall ====
Rank	after 28 events	Points
	(Japan) Ryōyū Kobayashi	1621
2	(Germany) Karl Geiger	1515
3	(Norway) Marius Lindvik	1231
4	(Norway) Halvor Egner Granerud	1227
5	(Austria) Stefan Kraft	1069
6	(Germany) Markus Eisenbichler	950
7	(Slovenia) Anže Lanišek	936
8	(Slovenia) Timi Zajc	711
9	(Austria) Jan Hörl	662
10	(Slovenia) Cene Prevc	657

==== Nations Cup ====
Rank	after 35 events	Points
	Austria	5789
2	Slovenia	5742
3	Germany	5389
4	Norway	5360
5	Japan	4047
6	Poland	2321
7	Switzerland	881
8	Russia	684
9	Finland	447
10	Czech Republic	54

==== Prize money ====
Rank	after 38 payouts	CHF
1	(Japan) Ryōyū Kobayashi	306,400
2	(Germany) Karl Geiger	193,100
3	(Austria) Stefan Kraft	176,400
4	(Norway) Halvor Egner Granerud	144,450
5	(Norway) Marius Lindvik	141,600
6	(Slovenia) Anže Lanišek	125,600
7	(Slovenia) Timi Zajc	123,550
8	(Germany) Markus Eisenbichler	116,250
9	(Austria) Jan Hörl	91,450
10	(Slovenia) Cene Prevc	86,050

==== Ski flying ====
Rank	after 4 events	Points
	(Slovenia) Žiga Jelar	270
2	(Slovenia) Timi Zajc	260
3	(Austria) Stefan Kraft	224
4	(Slovenia) Peter Prevc	194
5	(Slovenia) Anže Lanišek	171
6	(Norway) Marius Lindvik (Poland) Piotr Żyła	160
8	(Japan) Yukiya Satō	150
9	(Japan) Ryōyū Kobayashi	143
10	(Germany) Karl Geiger	95

==== Four Hills Tournament ====
Rank	after 4 events	Points
	(Japan) Ryōyū Kobayashi	1162.3
2	(Norway) Marius Lindvik	1138.1
3	(Norway) Halvor Egner Granerud	1128.2
4	(Germany) Karl Geiger	1123.6
5	(Germany) Markus Eisenbichler	1117.6
6	(Norway) Robert Johansson	1107.9
7	(Slovenia) Lovro Kos	1093.0
8	(Austria) Jan Hörl	1075.7
9	(Austria) Daniel Huber	1069.9
10	(Japan) Yukiya Satō	1064.7

==== Raw Air ====
Rank	after 6 events	Points
1	(Austria) Stefan Kraft	1203.3
2	(Germany) Karl Geiger	1172.6
3	(Japan) Ryōyū Kobayashi	1162.9
4	(Slovenia) Cene Prevc	1154.7
5	(Germany) Markus Eisenbichler	1149.2
6	(Norway) Halvor Egner Granerud	1132.9
7	(Norway) Robert Johansson	1132.1
8	(Austria) Manuel Fettner	1128.6
9	(Norway) Daniel-André Tande	1126.5
10	(Austria) Daniel Huber	1122.4

==== Planica7 ====
Rank	after 4 events	Points
1	(Slovenia) Timi Zajc	1532.5
2	(Norway) Marius Lindvik	1528.7
3	(Slovenia) Peter Prevc	1525.1
4	(Slovenia) Žiga Jelar	1512.9
5	(Slovenia) Anže Lanišek	1511.1
6	(Austria) Stefan Kraft	1501.2
7	(Japan) Yukiya Satō	1495.9
8	(Norway) Halvor Egner Granerud	1474.4
9	(Japan) Ryōyū Kobayashi	1468.1
10	(Poland) Kamil Stoch	1465.5

== Women's Individual ==
=== Calendar ===
NH – normal hill / LH – large hill
Num	#	Date	Place (Hill)	Event	Winner	Second	Third	Yellow bib	Ref.
165	1	26 November 2021	(Russia) Nizhny Tagil (Tramplin Stork HS97)	N _{134}	(Austria) Marita Kramer	(Slovenia) Ema Klinec	(Austria) Daniela Iraschko-Stolz	(Austria) Marita Kramer	
166	2	27 November 2021	(Russia) Nizhny Tagil (Tramplin Stork HS97)	N _{135}	(Slovenia) Ema Klinec	(Slovenia) Urša Bogataj	(Germany) Katharina Althaus	(Slovenia) Ema Klinec	
167	3	4 December 2021	(Norway) Lillehammer (Lysgårdsbakken HS98/140)	N _{136}	(Germany) Katharina Althaus	(Austria) Marita Kramer	(Slovenia) Urša Bogataj	(Austria) Marita Kramer	
168	4	5 December 2021	(Norway) Lillehammer (Lysgårdsbakken HS98/140)	L _{032}	(Austria) Marita Kramer	(Germany) Katharina Althaus	(Norway) Silje Opseth	(Austria) Marita Kramer	
169	5	10 December 2021	(Germany) Klingenthal (Vogtland Arena HS140)	L _{033}	(Austria) Marita Kramer	(Norway) Silje Opseth	(Slovenia) Urša Bogataj	(Austria) Marita Kramer	
170	6	11 December 2021	(Germany) Klingenthal (Vogtland Arena HS140)	L _{034}	(Austria) Marita Kramer	(Norway) Silje Opseth	(Germany) Katharina Althaus	(Austria) Marita Kramer	
171	7	17 December 2021	(Austria) Ramsau (W90-Mattensprung. HS98)	N _{137}	(Austria) Marita Kramer	(Germany) Katharina Althaus	(Slovenia) Urša Bogataj	(Austria) Marita Kramer	
172	8	31 December 2021	(Slovenia) Ljubno (Savina HS94)	N _{138}	(Slovenia) Nika Križnar	(Austria) Marita Kramer	(Slovenia) Ema Klinec	(Austria) Marita Kramer	
173	9	1 January 2022	(Slovenia) Ljubno (Savina HS94)	N _{139}	(Japan) Sara Takanashi	(Slovenia) Urša Bogataj	(Austria) Marita Kramer	(Austria) Marita Kramer	
1st Silvester Tournament Overall (31 December 2021 – 1 January 2022)					(Austria) Marita Kramer	(Slovenia) Nika Križnar	(Japan) Sara Takanashi	Silvester Tour	
		8 January 2022	(Japan) Sapporo (Ōkurayama HS137)	L _{cnx}	cancelled due to the COVID-19 pandemic; one event from Sapporo replaced in Lillehammer on 2 March			—	
		9 January 2022	(Japan) Sapporo (Ōkurayama HS137)	L _{cnx}	cancelled due to the COVID-19 pandemic; one event from Sapporo replaced in Lillehammer on 2 March			—	
		14 January 2022	(Japan) Zaō (Yamagata HS102)	N _{cnx}	cancelled due to the COVID-19 pandemic; one event from Sapporo replaced in Lillehammer on 2 March			—	
		15 January 2022	(Japan) Zaō (Yamagata HS102)	N _{cnx}	cancelled due to the COVID-19 pandemic; one event from Sapporo replaced in Lillehammer on 2 March			—	
174	10	29 January 2022	(Germany) Willingen (Mühlenkopfschanze HS147)	L _{035}	(Austria) Marita Kramer	(Germany) Katharina Althaus	(Slovenia) Ema Klinec	(Austria) Marita Kramer	
175	11	30 January 2022	(Germany) Willingen (Mühlenkopfschanze HS147)	L _{036}	(Slovenia) Nika Križnar	(Germany) Katharina Althaus	(Russia) Aleksandra Kustova	(Austria) Marita Kramer	
2022 Winter Olympics (5 February • (China) Zhangjiakou)
176	12	26 February 2022	(Austria) Hinzenbach (Aigner-Schanze HS90)	N _{140}	(Slovenia) Urša Bogataj	(Slovenia) Nika Križnar	(Austria) Lisa Eder	(Austria) Marita Kramer	
177	13	27 February 2022	(Austria) Hinzenbach (Aigner-Schanze HS90)	N _{141}	(Slovenia) Nika Križnar	(Austria) Marita Kramer	(France) Joséphine Pagnier	(Austria) Marita Kramer	
1st Alpenkrone Overall (17 December 2021 and 26–27 February 2022)					(Slovenia) Nika Križnar	(Austria) Marita Kramer	(Austria) Lisa Eder	Alpenkrone	
prologue		2 March 2022	(Norway) Lillehammer (Lysgårdsbakken HS140)	L _{Qro}	(Slovenia) Nika Križnar	(Austria) Marita Kramer	(Norway) Silje Opseth	—	
178	14	2 March 2022	(Norway) Lillehammer (Lysgårdsbakken HS140)	L _{037}	(Japan) Sara Takanashi	(Slovenia) Nika Križnar	(Slovenia) Urša Bogataj	(Austria) Marita Kramer	
prologue		3 March 2022	(Norway) Lillehammer (Lysgårdsbakken HS140)	L _{Qro}	(Slovenia) Urša Bogataj	(Slovenia) Nika Križnar	(Japan) Sara Takanashi	—	
179	15	3 March 2022	(Norway) Lillehammer (Lysgårdsbakken HS140)	L _{038}	(Austria) Marita Kramer	(Slovenia) Nika Križnar	(Slovenia) Urša Bogataj	(Austria) Marita Kramer	
prologue		5 March 2022	(Norway) Oslo (Holmenkollbakken HS134)	L _{Qro}	(Slovenia) Nika Križnar	(Austria) Marita Kramer	(Japan) Yūki Itō	—	
180	16	5 March 2022	(Norway) Oslo (Holmenkollbakken HS134)	L _{039}	(Norway) Silje Opseth	(Slovenia) Nika Križnar	(Japan) Sara Takanashi	(Austria) Marita Kramer	
prologue		6 March 2022	(Norway) Oslo (Holmenkollbakken HS134)	L _{Qro}	(Slovenia) Nika Križnar	(Japan) Sara Takanashi	(Slovenia) Urša Bogataj	—	
181	17	6 March 2022	(Norway) Oslo (Holmenkollbakken HS134)	L _{040}	(Japan) Sara Takanashi	(Slovenia) Urša Bogataj	(Japan) Yūki Itō	(Austria) Marita Kramer	
3rd Women's Raw Air Overall (2–6 March 2022)					(Slovenia) Nika Križnar	(Japan) Sara Takanashi	(Slovenia) Urša Bogataj	Raw Air	
182	18	12 March 2022	(Germany) Oberhof (Kanzlersgrund HS100)	N _{142}	(Slovenia) Urša Bogataj	(Slovenia) Nika Križnar	(Germany) Katharina Althaus	(Austria) Marita Kramer	
183	19	13 March 2022	(Germany) Oberhof (Kanzlersgrund HS100)	N _{143}	(Slovenia) Urša Bogataj	(Slovenia) Nika Križnar	(Slovenia) Ema Klinec	(Austria) Marita Kramer	
		19 March 2022	(Russia) Nizhny Tagil (Tramplin Stork HS97)	N _{cnx}	cancelled due to the Russian invasion of Ukraine			—	
		20 March 2022	(Russia) Nizhny Tagil (Tramplin Stork HS97)	N _{cnx}	cancelled due to the Russian invasion of Ukraine			—	
		26 March 2022	(Russia) Chaykovsky (Snezhinka HS140)	L _{cnx}	cancelled due to the Russian invasion of Ukraine			—	
		27 March 2022	(Russia) Chaykovsky (Snezhinka HS140)	L _{cnx}	cancelled due to the Russian invasion of Ukraine			—	
3rd Russia Tour Blue Bird Overall (planned from 19–27 March but cancelled)					completely cancelled due to Ukraine-Russia War			Blue Bird	

=== Standings ===
==== Overall ====
Rank	after 19 events	Points
	(Austria) Marita Kramer	1316
2	(Slovenia) Nika Križnar	1191
3	(Slovenia) Urša Bogataj	1151
4	(Germany) Katharina Althaus	906
5	(Japan) Sara Takanashi	843
6	(Norway) Silje Opseth	731
7	(Slovenia) Ema Klinec	680
8	(Japan) Yūki Itō	449
9	(Austria) Lisa Eder	420
10	(Austria) J. Seifriedsberger	393

==== Nations Cup ====
Rank	after 22 events	Points
	Slovenia	4570
2	Austria	3823
3	Japan	2213
4	Germany	1931
5	Norway	1809
6	Russia	897
7	France	553
8	Canada	391
9	Sweden	359
10	Finland	278

==== Prize money ====
Rank	after 25 payouts	CHF
1	(Slovenia) Nika Križnar	107,932
2	(Austria) Marita Kramer	71,508
3	(Slovenia) Urša Bogataj	68,988
4	(Japan) Sara Takanashi	56,939
5	(Norway) Silje Opseth	37,721
6	(Germany) Katharina Althaus	34,333
7	(Slovenia) Ema Klinec	33,340
8	(Japan) Yūki Itō	18,416
9	(Austria) Chiara Kreuzer	17,697
10	(Austria) Lisa Eder	17,080

==== Silvester Tournament ====
Rank	after 2 events	Points
1	(Austria) Marita Kramer	519.4
2	(Slovenia) Nika Križnar	515.2
3	(Japan) Sara Takanashi	513.0
4	(Slovenia) Urša Bogataj	511.4
5	(Slovenia) Ema Klinec	509.0
6	(Austria) Daniela Iraschko-Stolz	489.2
7	(Germany) Katharina Althaus	488.2
8	(Slovenia) Nika Prevc	478.7
9	(Austria) Eva Pinkelnig	473.6
10	(Norway) Thea Minyan Bjørseth	468.7

==== Alpenkrone ====
Rank	after 3 events	Points
1	(Slovenia) Nika Križnar	701.0
2	(Austria) Marita Kramer	684.3
3	(Austria) Lisa Eder	638.3
4	(Sweden) Frida Westman	637.2
5	(Austria) J. Seifriedsberger	615.8
6	(Norway) Silje Opseth	611.9
7	(Norway) Thea Minyan Bjørseth	611.5
8	(Slovenia) Špela Rogelj	605.2
9	(Russia) Sofia Tikhonova	601.7
10	(Canada) Abigail Strate	599.7

==== Raw Air ====
Rank	after 8 events	Points
1	(Slovenia) Nika Križnar	1592.7
2	(Japan) Sara Takanashi	1553.1
3	(Slovenia) Urša Bogataj	1546.0
4	(Austria) Marita Kramer	1511.0
5	(Japan) Yūki Itō	1406.9
6	(Norway) Silje Opseth	1402.7
7	(Austria) Chiara Kreuzer	1318.8
8	(France) Joséphine Pagnier	1298.5
9	(Slovenia) Jerneja Brecl	1275.1
10	(Austria) J. Seifriedsberger	1239.6

== Team events ==
=== Calendar ===
Num	#	Date	Place (Hill)	Event	Winner	Second	Third	R.
Men's team
112	1	4 December 2021	(Poland) Wisła (Malinka HS134)	L _{086}	Austria Manuel Fettner; Jan Hörl; Daniel Huber; Stefan Kraft	Germany Pius Paschke; Stephan Leyhe; Markus Eisenbichler; Karl Geiger	Slovenia Cene Prevc; Peter Prevc; Timi Zajc; Anže Lanišek	
113	2	9 January 2022	(Austria) Bischofshofen (Paul-Ausserleitner HS142)	L _{087}	Austria Manuel Fettner; Jan Hörl; Philipp Aschenwald; Daniel Huber	Japan Yukiya Satō; Keiichi Satō; Junshirō Kobayashi; Ryōyū Kobayashi	Norway Daniel-André Tande; Johann André Forfang; Halvor Egner Granerud; Marius Lindvik	
114	3	15 January 2022	(Poland) Zakopane (Wielka Krokiew HS140	L _{088}	Slovenia Lovro Kos; Peter Prevc; Timi Zajc; Anže Lanišek	Germany Severin Freund; Stephan Leyhe; Markus Eisenbichler; Karl Geiger	Japan Yukiya Satō; Naoki Nakamura; Junshirō Kobayashi; Ryōyū Kobayashi	
115	4	26 February 2022	(Finland) Lahti (Salpausselkä HS130	L _{089}	Austria Jan Hörl; Clemens Aigner; Ulrich Wohlgenannt; Stefan Kraft	Slovenia Žiga Jelar; Cene Prevc; Timi Zajc; Peter Prevc	Germany Constantin Schmid; Severin Freund; Markus Eisenbichler; Karl Geiger	
116	5	26 March 2022	(Slovenia) Planica (Letalnica bratov Gorišek HS240	F _{025}	Slovenia Žiga Jelar; Peter Prevc; Timi Zajc; Anže Lanišek	Norway Marius Lindvik; Bendik Jakobsen Heggli; Johann André Forfang; Halvor Egner Granerud	Austria Michael Hayböck; Daniel Tschofenig; Manuel Fettner; Stefan Kraft	
Mixed team
4	1	28 January 2022	(Germany) Willingen (Mühlenkopfschanze HS147)	L _{001}	Slovenia Ema Klinec; Cene Prevc; Urša Bogataj; Anže Lanišek	Norway Thea Minyan Bjørseth; Halvor Egner Granerud; Silje Opseth; Marius Lindvik	Austria Eva Pinkelnig; Daniel Huber; Marita Kramer; Stefan Kraft	
5	2	4 March 2022	(Norway) Oslo (Holmenkollbakken HS134)	L _{002}	Slovenia Urša Bogataj; Lovro Kos; Nika Križnar; Timi Zajc	Austria Chiara Kreuzer; Manuel Fettner; Marita Kramer; Stefan Kraft	Norway Anna Odine Strøm; Robert Johansson; Silje Opseth; Halvor Egner Granerud	
Women's team
9	1	25 February 2022	(Austria) Hinzenbach (Aigner-Schanze HS90)	N _{009}	Austria Chiara Kreuzer; Jacqueline Seifriedsberger; Lisa Eder; Marita Kramer	Russia Aleksandra Kustova; Irma Makhinia; Sofia Tikhonova; Irina Avvakumova	Slovenia Urša Bogataj; Maja Vtič; Špela Rogelj; Nika Križnar	

== Podium table by nation ==
Table showing the World Cup podium places (gold–1st place, silver–2nd place, bronze–3rd place) by the countries represented by the athletes.

Rank	Nation	Gold	Silver	Bronze	Total
1	Austria	17	4	11	32
2	Slovenia	14	17	17	48
3	Japan	11	5	3	19
4	Norway	9	13	10	32
5	Germany	5	13	10	28
6	Poland	0	1	2	3
7	Russia	0	1	1	2
8	France	0	0	1	1
Totals (8 entries)		56	54	55	165

== Points distribution ==
The table shows the number of points won in the 2021/22 FIS Ski Jumping World Cup for men and women.

Place	1	2	3	4	5	6	7	8	9	10	11	12	13	14	15	16	17	18	19	20	21	22	23	24	25	26	27	28	29	30
Individual	100	80	60	50	45	40	36	32	29	26	24	22	20	18	16	15	14	13	12	11	10	9	8	7	6	5	4	3	2	1
Team	400	350	300	250	200	150	100	50
Mixed Team	200	175	150	125	100	75	50	25

== Qualifications ==
In case the number of participating athletes is 50 (men) / 40 (women) or lower, a Prologue competition round must be organized. In the Women's Silvester Tournament qualifies 50 jumpers.

=== Men ===
No.	Place	Qualifications	Competition	Size	Winner
1	(Russia) Nizhny Tagil	19 November 2021	20 November 2021	LH	(Poland) Kamil Stoch
2	(Russia) Nizhny Tagil	21 November 2021		LH	(Germany) Markus Eisenbichler
3	(Finland) Ruka	26 November 2021	27 November 2021	LH	(Japan) Ryōyū Kobayashi
4	(Finland) Ruka	28 November 2021		LH	(Germany) Karl Geiger
5	(Poland) Wisła	3 December 2021	5 December 2021	LH	(Austria) Jan Hörl
6	(Germany) Klingenthal	10 December 2021	11 December 2021	LH	(Japan) Ryōyū Kobayashi
7	(Germany) Klingenthal	12 December 2021		LH	(Japan) Ryōyū Kobayashi
8	(Switzerland) Engelberg	17 December 2021	18 December 2021	LH	(Japan) Ryōyū Kobayashi
9	(Switzerland) Engelberg	19 December 2021		LH	(Japan) Ryōyū Kobayashi
10	(Germany) Oberstdorf	28 December 2021	29 December 2021	LH	(Japan) Ryōyū Kobayashi
11	(Germany) Garmisch-P.	31 December 2021	1 January 2022	LH	(Germany) Markus Eisenbichler
12	(Austria) Innsbruck (Note: Qualification results were cancelled by cancelling the competition on January 4, 2022 due to strong winds and moving it to Bischofshofen.)	3 January 2022	4 January 2022	LH	(Japan) Ryōyū Kobayashi
13	(Austria) Bischofshofen	5 January 2022		LH	(Japan) Ryōyū Kobayashi
14	(Austria) Bischofshofen	6 January 2022		LH	(Japan) Ryōyū Kobayashi
15	(Austria) Bischofshofen	8 January 2022		LH	(Japan) Yukiya Satō
16	(Poland) Zakopane	16 January 2022		LH	(Norway) Marius Lindvik
	(Japan) Sapporo	21 January 2022		LH	cancelled due to the COVID-19 pandemic
	(Japan) Sapporo	22 January 2022		LH	cancelled due to the COVID-19 pandemic
	(Japan) Sapporo	23 January 2022		LH	cancelled due to the COVID-19 pandemic
17	(Germany) Titisee-Neustadt	21 January 2022	22 January 2022	LH	(Slovenia) Cene Prevc
18	(Germany) Titisee-Neustadt	23 January 2022		LH	(Germany) Karl Geiger
19	(Germany) Willingen	28 January 2022	29 January 2022	LH	(Poland) Kamil Stoch (Prologue)
20	(Germany) Willingen	30 January 2022		LH	Cancelled due to strong wind (Prologue)
21	(Finland) Lahti	25 February 2022		LH	Cancelled due to heavy snowfall
22	(Finland) Lahti	27 February 2022		LH	(Norway) Halvor Egner Granerud
23	(Norway) Lillehammer	2 March 2022	3 March 2022	LH	(Norway) Johann André Forfang
24	(Norway) Oslo	5 March 2022		LH	(Poland) Kamil Stoch
25	(Norway) Oslo	6 March 2022		LH	(Germany) Karl Geiger
26	(Germany) Oberstdorf	18 March 2022	19 March 2022	FH	(Austria) Stefan Kraft
27	(Germany) Oberstdorf	20 March 2022		FH	(Slovenia) Domen Prevc
28	(Slovenia) Planica	24 March 2022	25 March 2022	FH	(Slovenia) Anže Lanišek

=== Women ===
No.	Place	Qualifications	Competition	Size	Winner
1	(Russia) Nizhny Tagil	25 November 2021	26 November 2021	NH	(Austria) Marita Kramer
2	(Russia) Nizhny Tagil	27 November 2021		NH	(Germany) Katharina Althaus
3	(Norway) Lillehammer	3 December 2021	4 December 2021	NH	(Austria) Marita Kramer
4	(Norway) Lillehammer	5 December 2021		LH	(Slovenia) Ema Klinec
5	(Germany) Klingenthal	9 December 2021	10 December 2021	LH	(Austria) Marita Kramer
6	(Germany) Klingenthal	11 December 2021		LH	(Austria) Marita Kramer
7	(Austria) Ramsau	16 December 2021	17 December 2021	NH	(Austria) Marita Kramer
8	(Slovenia) Ljubno	30 December 2021	31 December 2021	NH	(Austria) Marita Kramer
9	(Slovenia) Ljubno	1 January 2022		NH	(Slovenia) Urša Bogataj
	(Japan) Sapporo	7 January 2022	8 January 2022	LH	cancelled due to the COVID-19 pandemic
	(Japan) Sapporo	9 January 2022		LH	cancelled due to the COVID-19 pandemic
	(Japan) Zaō	13 January 2022	14 January 2022	NH	cancelled due to the COVID-19 pandemic
	(Japan) Zaō	15 January 2022		NH	cancelled due to the COVID-19 pandemic
10	(Germany) Willingen	28 January 2022	29 January 2022	LH	(Japan) Yūki Itō (Prologue)
11	(Germany) Willingen	30 January 2022		LH	Cancelled due to strong wind (Prologue)
12	(Austria) Hinzenbach	24 February 2022	26 February 2022	NH	(Slovenia) Špela Rogelj
13	(Austria) Hinzenbach	27 February 2022		NH	(Slovenia) Nika Križnar
14	(Norway) Lillehammer	2 March 2022		LH	(Slovenia) Nika Križnar
15	(Norway) Lillehammer	3 March 2022		LH	(Slovenia) Urša Bogataj
16	(Norway) Oslo	5 March 2022		LH	(Slovenia) Nika Križnar
17	(Norway) Oslo	6 March 2022		LH	(Slovenia) Nika Križnar
18	(Germany) Oberhof	11 March 2022	12 March 2022	NH	(Slovenia) Urša Bogataj
19	(Germany) Oberhof	13 March 2022		NH	(Slovenia) Urša Bogataj
	(Russia) Nizhny Tagil	18 March 2022	19 March 2022	NH	cancelled due to the Russian invasion of Ukraine
	(Russia) Nizhny Tagil	20 March 2022		NH	cancelled due to the Russian invasion of Ukraine
	(Russia) Chaykovsky	25 March 2022	26 March 2022	LH	cancelled due to the Russian invasion of Ukraine

== Achievements ==
First World Cup career victory

Men

- (Slovenia) Anže Lanišek (25), in his 9th season – the WC 4 in Ruka
- (Austria) Jan Hörl (23), in his 4th season – the WC 5 in Wisła
- (Austria) Daniel Huber (29), in his 7th season – the WC 13 in Bischofshofen
- (Slovenia) Žiga Jelar (24), in his 6th season – the WC 27 in Planica

Women

- (Slovenia) Ema Klinec (23), in her 8th season – the WC 2 in Nizhny Tagil
- (Slovenia) Urša Bogataj (26), in her 11th season – the WC 12 in Hinzenbach
- (Norway) Silje Opseth (22), in her 7th season – the WC 16 in Oslo

First World Cup podium

Men

- (Slovenia) Lovro Kos (22), in his 2nd season – the WC 11 in Garmisch-Partenkirchen – 3rd place
- (Slovenia) Cene Prevc (25), in his 8th season – the WC 19 in Willingen – 3rd place

Women

- (Russia) Aleksandra Kustova (23), in her 7th season – the WC 11 in Willingen – 3rd place
- (Austria) Lisa Eder (20), in her 5th season – the WC 12 in Hinzenbach – 3rd place
- (France) Joséphine Pagnier (19), in her 4th season – the WC 13 in Hinzenbach – 3rd place

Number of wins this season (in brackets are all-time wins)

Men

- (Japan) Ryōyū Kobayashi – 8 (27)
- (Norway) Marius Lindvik – 5 (8)
- (Austria) Stefan Kraft – 4 (25)
- (Germany) Karl Geiger – 4 (13)
- (Norway) Halvor Egner Granerud – 2 (13)
- (Norway) Daniel-André Tande – 1 (8)
- (Slovenia) Timi Zajc – 1 (2)
- (Slovenia) Anže Lanišek – 1 (1)
- (Austria) Jan Hörl – 1 (1)
- (Austria) Daniel Huber – 1 (1)
- (Slovenia) Žiga Jelar – 1 (1)

Women

- (Austria) Marita Kramer – 7 (15)
- (Japan) Sara Takanashi – 3 (63)
- (Slovenia) Nika Križnar – 3 (5)
- (Slovenia) Urša Bogataj – 3 (3)
- (Germany) Katharina Althaus – 1 (8)
- (Slovenia) Ema Klinec – 1 (1)
- (Norway) Silje Opseth – 1 (1)

== Retirements ==
The following ski jumpers retired during or after the 2021–22 season:

Men

- (Finland) Andreas Alamommo
- (Austria) Thomas Diethart
- (Germany) Richard Freitag
- (Germany) Severin Freund
- (Japan) Daiki Itō
- (Czech Republic) Čestmír Kožíšek
- (Germany) Marinus Kraus
- (France) Jonathan Learoyd
- (Germany) Kilian Maerkl
- (Czech Republic) Viktor Polášek
- (Slovenia) Cene Prevc
- (Switzerland) Andreas Schuler
- (Germany) Adrian Sell
- (Austria) Markus Schiffner
- (Slovenia) Anže Semenič
- (Canada) Matthew Soukup

Women

- (France) Océane Avocat Gros
- (Slovenia) Jerneja Brecl
- (Finland) Susanna Forsström
- (Japan) Yurika Hirayama
- (Japan) Kaori Iwabuchi
- (United States) Nina Lussi
- (South Korea) Park Guy-lim
- (Czech Republic) Štěpánka Ptáčková
- (Slovenia) Špela Rogelj
- (Japan) Misaki Shigeno
- (Poland) Joanna Szwab
- (Germany) Carina Vogt
- (Hungary) Virág Vörös

== See also ==
- 2021 FIS Ski Jumping Grand Prix
- 2021–22 FIS Ski Jumping Continental Cup
- 2021–22 FIS Cup (ski jumping)
