= 1st Silvester Tournament =

Women's ski jumping competition

- Venue: Savina Ski Jumping Center
- Location: Ljubno ob Savinji, Slovenia
- Dates: 30 December 2021 – 1 January 2022
- Competitors: 70 from 17 nations

Medalists
gold medal	(Austria) Marita Kramer — 519.4 points
silver medal	(Slovenia) Nika Križnar — 515.2 points
bronze medal	(Japan) Sara Takanashi — 513.0 points

The 1st Silvester Tournament was the inaugural edition of the Silvester Tournament, a women's ski jumping competition inspired by the Four Hills Tournament and part of the 2021–22 World Cup season.

== Tournament ==
=== Rules ===
Just like the men's Four Hills Tournament, the competition was based on a knockout system with 50 contestants divided into 25 pairs. The top 30 advanced to the final round, which consisted of 25 winners and the top 5 lucky losers.

=== Schedule ===
Stage	Venue	Date	Event	Start time (CET)
1	(Slovenia) Ljubno 1	30 December 2021	Qualification 1	16:30
1	(Slovenia) Ljubno 1	31 December 2021	Competition 1	16:30
2	(Slovenia) Ljubno 2	1 January 2022	Qualification 2	10:45
2	(Slovenia) Ljubno 2	1 January 2022	Competition 2	16:00

=== Prize money ===
The overall winner, Marita Kramer, received 10,000 CHF and the Golden Owl Trophy.

Prize	Total	Overall winner	Qualification
Swiss francs	40,000 CHF	10,000 CHF	—

== Results ==
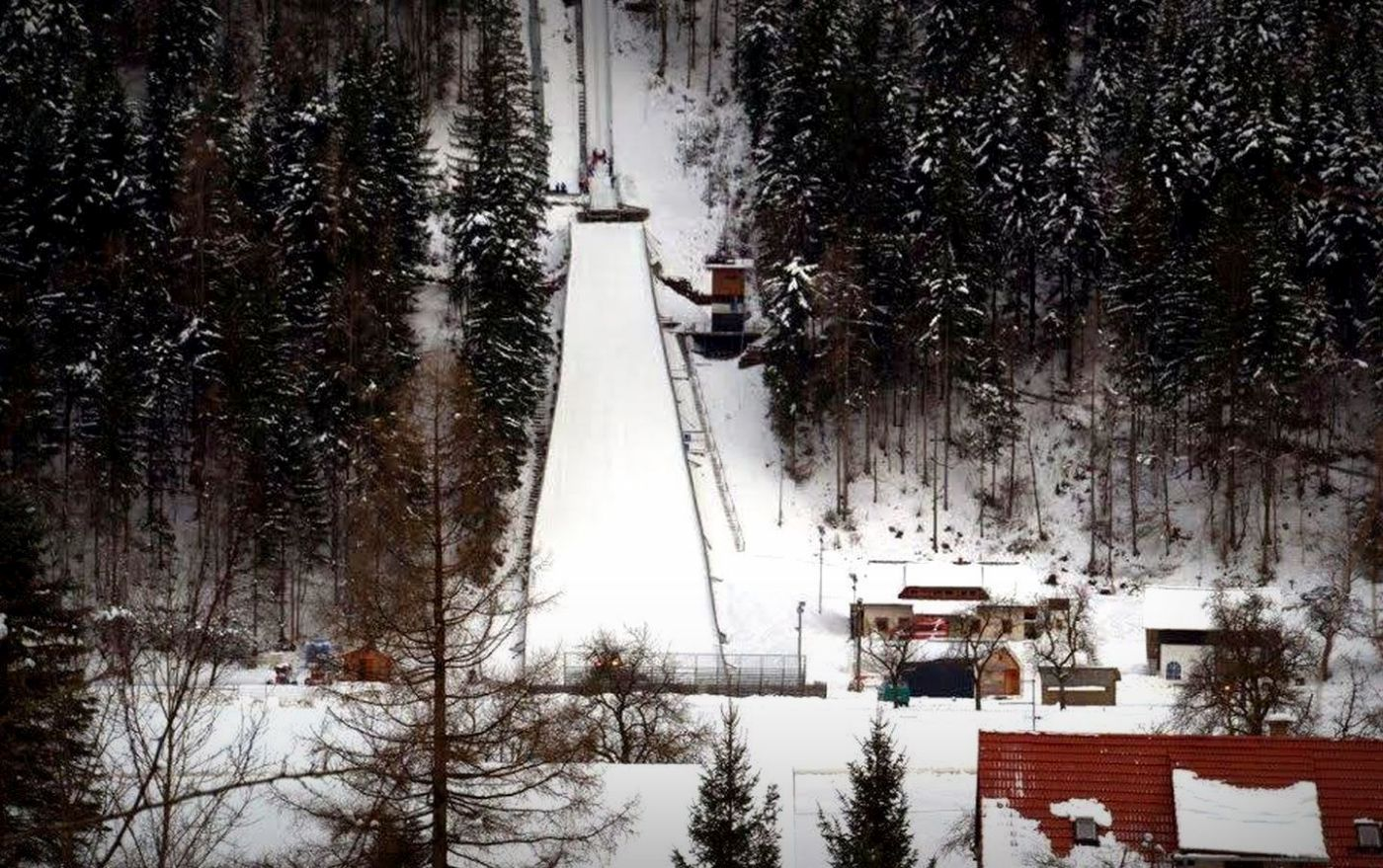
Savina Ski Jumping Center hosted both events

=== Ljubno 1 ===
(Slovenia) Savina Ski Jumping Center HS94
31 December 2021

Rank	Name	Nationality	Jump 1 (m)	Round 1 (pts)	Jump 2 (m)	Round 2 (pts)	Total Points
1	Nika Križnar	Slovenia	91.5	131.7	94.5	132.0	263.7
2	Marita Kramer	Austria	94	134.7	89	125.2	259.9
3	Ema Klinec	Slovenia	91	130.4	91	126.8	257.2
4	Urša Bogataj	Slovenia	84.5	121.6	91.5	128.0	249.6
5	Katharina Althaus	Germany	91	127.5	84.5	118.7	246.2
5	Sara Takanashi	Japan	92	124.8	87	121.4	246.2
7	Daniela Iraschko-Stolz	Austria	87	119.8	89	123.8	243.6
8	Lisa Eder	Austria	85.5	119.4	90	119.7	239.1
9	Eva Pinkelnig	Austria	87	120.1	85	117.6	237.7
10	Thea Minyan Bjørseth	Norway	86	117.4	85	118.0	235.4

=== Ljubno 2 ===
(Slovenia) Savina Ski Jumping Center HS94
1 January 2022 (second competition)

Rank	Name	Nationality	Jump 1 (m)	Round 1 (pts)	Jump 2 (m)	Round 2 (pts)	Total Points
1	Sara Takanashi	Japan	95	134.4	89	132.4	266.8
2	Urša Bogataj	Slovenia	93.5	131.4	88	130.4	261.8
3	Marita Kramer	Austria	91.5	128.5	89.5	131.0	259.5
4	Ema Klinec	Slovenia	86	119.5	94.5	132.3	251.8
5	Nika Križnar	Slovenia	87.5	122.5	91.5	129.0	251.5
6	Daniela Iraschko-Stolz	Austria	84.5	118.0	92	127.6	245.6
7	Nika Prevc	Slovenia	86.5	121.3	84	122.4	243.7
8	Katharina Althaus	Germany	86	120.4	86	121.6	242.0
9	Yūka Setō	Japan	88	119.9	86	120.9	240.5
10	Eva Pinkelnig	Austria	87	119.1	87	116.8	235.9

== Overall standings ==
The final standings after both events:

Rank	Name	Nationality	Ljubno 1	Ljubno 2	Total points
1st place, gold medalist(s)	Marita Kramer	Austria	259.9	259.5	519.4
2nd place, silver medalist(s)	Nika Križnar	Slovenia	263.7	251.5	515.2
3rd place, bronze medalist(s)	Sara Takanashi	Japan	246.2	266.8	513.0
4	Urša Bogataj	Slovenia	249.6	261.8	511.4
5	Ema Klinec	Slovenia	257.2	251.8	509.0
6	Daniela Iraschko-Stolz	Austria	243.6	245.6	489.2
7	Katharina Althaus	Germany	246.2	242.0	488.2
8	Nika Prevc	Slovenia	235.0	243.7	478.7
9	Eva Pinkelnig	Austria	237.7	235.9	473.6
10	Thea Minyan Bjørseth	Norway	235.4	233.3	468.7
