= Lisa Eder =

Austrian ski jumper (born 2001)

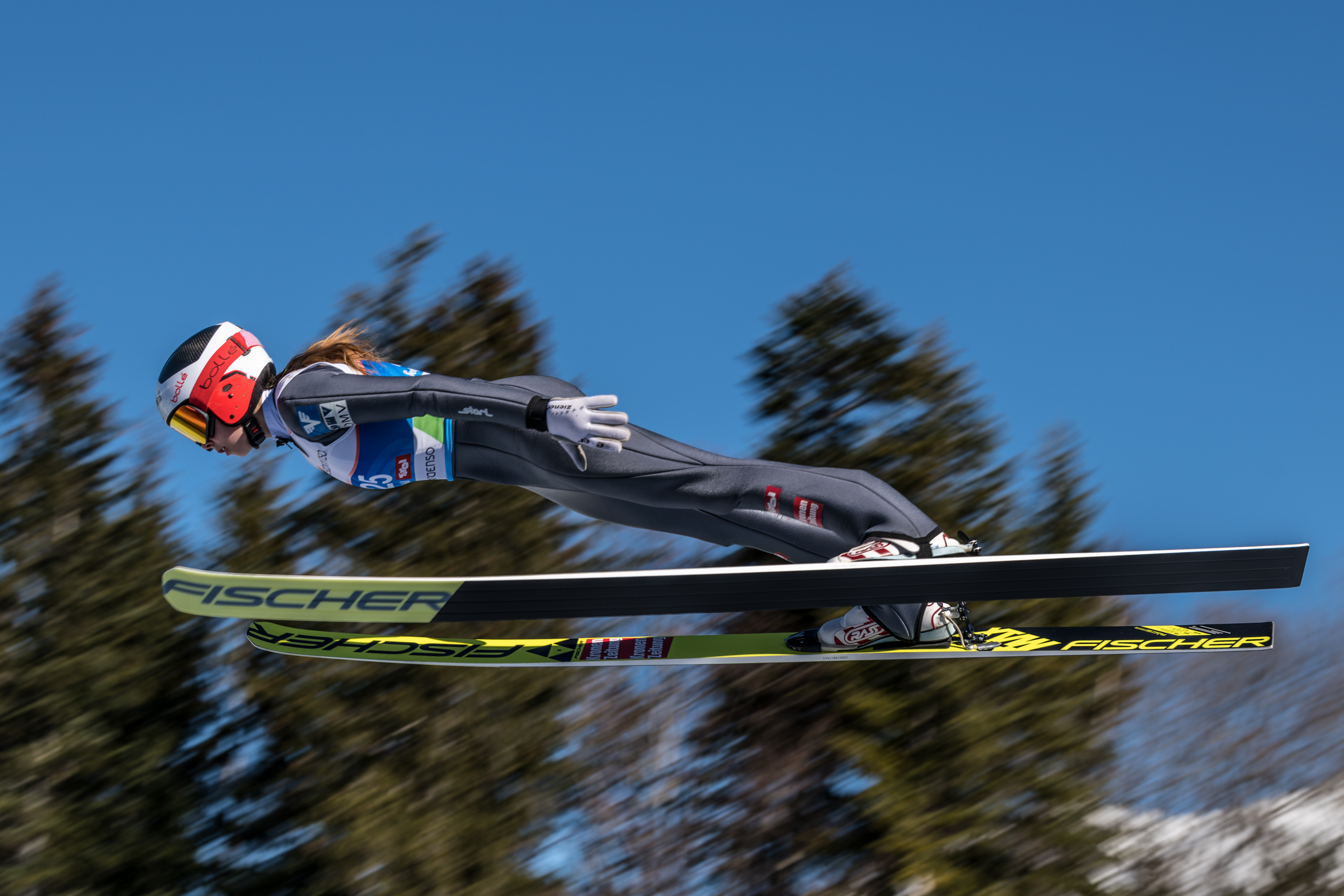
- Eder in 2019

Personal information
- Nationality: Austria
- Born: 12 August 2001 (age 25) St. Johann in Tirol, Austria

Sport
- Sport: Skiing
- Club: SK Saalfelden

World Cup career
- Seasons: 2018–present

Achievements and titles
- Personal bests: 174 m (571 ft); Vikersund, 17 March 2024
Medal record
Women's ski jumping
Representing Austria
World Championships
Silver medal – second place	2025 Trondheim	Team NH
Junior World Championships
Bronze medal – third place	2019 Lahti	Team NH
Gold medal – first place	2020 Oberwiesenthal	Team NH
Gold medal – first place	2020 Oberwiesenthal	Mixed Team NH
Gold medal – first place	2021 Lahti	Team NH
- Updated on 27 February 2022

Lisa Eder (born 12 August 2001) is an Austrian ski jumper.

== Career ==
Eder started competing in the Alpen Cup on 9 August 2015 jumping the small Vogtlandschanzen in Klingenthal and placed 8th. On 11 August 2016, Eder celebrated her first victory in the Alpen Cup on the Pöhlbachschanze in Pöhla. On 18 August 2017, she was allowed to start in the Continental Cup for the first time and finished 15th on the Fichtelbergschanzen in Oberwiesenthal. On 15 December 2017, Eder finished fourth in the Continental Cup on the Tveitanbakken in Notodden Municipality, narrowly missing her first podium finish.

For the World Cup on the Miyanomori Ski Jump Stadium in Sapporo and on the Zaō Hill in Zaō, she was nominated for the first time for World Cup jumping. While she still failed to qualify in Sapporo, she finished 36th in Zaō on 19 January 2018, missing her first World Cup points. On 20 January 2018, she took sixth place alongside Chiara Hölzl, Claudia Purker and Jacqueline Seifriedsberger in the team competition. She also took part in the Junior World Championships in Kandersteg. In the individual competition on Lötschberg Hill, she took 24th place and seventh place together with Marita Kramer, Sophie Mair and Claudia Purker. On 24 March 2018, she achieved her best World Cup result to date with eleventh place on the Audi Arena Oberstdorf in Oberstdorf.

At the 2019 Junior Championships in Lahti, Finland, she won the bronze medal with the Austrian junior team, which also included Marita Kramer, Lisa Hirner and Purker, while finishing fourth in the mixed team and tenth in the singles. On 9 February 2019 together with her teammates, Seifriedsberger, Hölzl and Eva Pinkelnig, she reached the podium of a World Cup competition for the first time in the team competition on the Logarska dolina in Ljubno, Slovenia. On 8 and 9 February 2020, she finished eighth and seventh in Hinzenbach, her first two places in the top ten in an individual World Cup.

At the Olympic Winter Games in Beijing, she took fifth place with the Austrian mixed team. In the individual competition, she took eighth place.

Eder is a member of SK Saalfelden-Salzburg.

== World Cup ==
=== Standings ===
Season	Overall
2017/18	34
2018/19	44
2019/20	21
2020/21	20
2021/22	9
2023/24	16
2024/25	6

=== Individual wins ===
No.	Season	Date	Location	Hill	Size
1	2025–26	21 January 2026	(Japan) Zaō	Yamagata HS102	NH
2	2025–26	1 March 2026	(Austria) Hinzenbach	Aigner-Schanze HS90	NH

== Grand Prix ==
=== Standings ===
Season	Overall
2018	32
2019	27
2021	17

== Personal life ==
Eder is married to former ski jumper Manuel Fettner.
