= Silvester Tournament =

Ski jumping competition

Silvester Tournament
Debut:	31 December 2021
Origin:	Ljubno ob Savinji
Event:	FIS World Cup
Editions:	2
Hills
No.1:	Villacher Alpenarena
No.2:	Savina Ski Jumping Center
Current locations
No.1:	(Austria) Villach
No.2:	(Slovenia) Ljubno ob Savinji

The Silvester Tournament is a women's FIS World Cup ski jumping competition, established in 2021 in Ljubno ob Savinji, Slovenia, and inspired by the Four Hills Tournament.

The competition is based on a knockout system with 50 contestants divided into 25 pairs. The top 30 advance to the final round consisting of 25 winners and the top 5 lucky losers.

In the first edition, the competition consisted of two events in Slovenia. For the second edition, the Silvester Tournament was expanded to four events in two countries, as Villach joined Ljubno as a co-host.

== Tournament ==
=== Map of hosts ===
(Austria) Villach	(Slovenia) Ljubno ob Savinji
Villacher Alpenarena (HS98)	Savina Ski Jumping Center (HS94)
Austria	Slovenia

=== Overall standings ===
Edition	Start	End	Winner	Second	Third	Ref.
1st	31 December 2021	1 January 2022	(Austria) Marita Kramer	(Slovenia) Nika Križnar	(Japan) Sara Takanashi	
2nd	28 December 2022	1 January 2023	(Austria) Eva Pinkelnig	(Norway) Anna Odine Strøm	(Slovenia) Nika Križnar	
