= Savina Ski Jumping Center =

Ski jumping center in Slovenia

Coordinates: 46.3396°N 14.8272°E

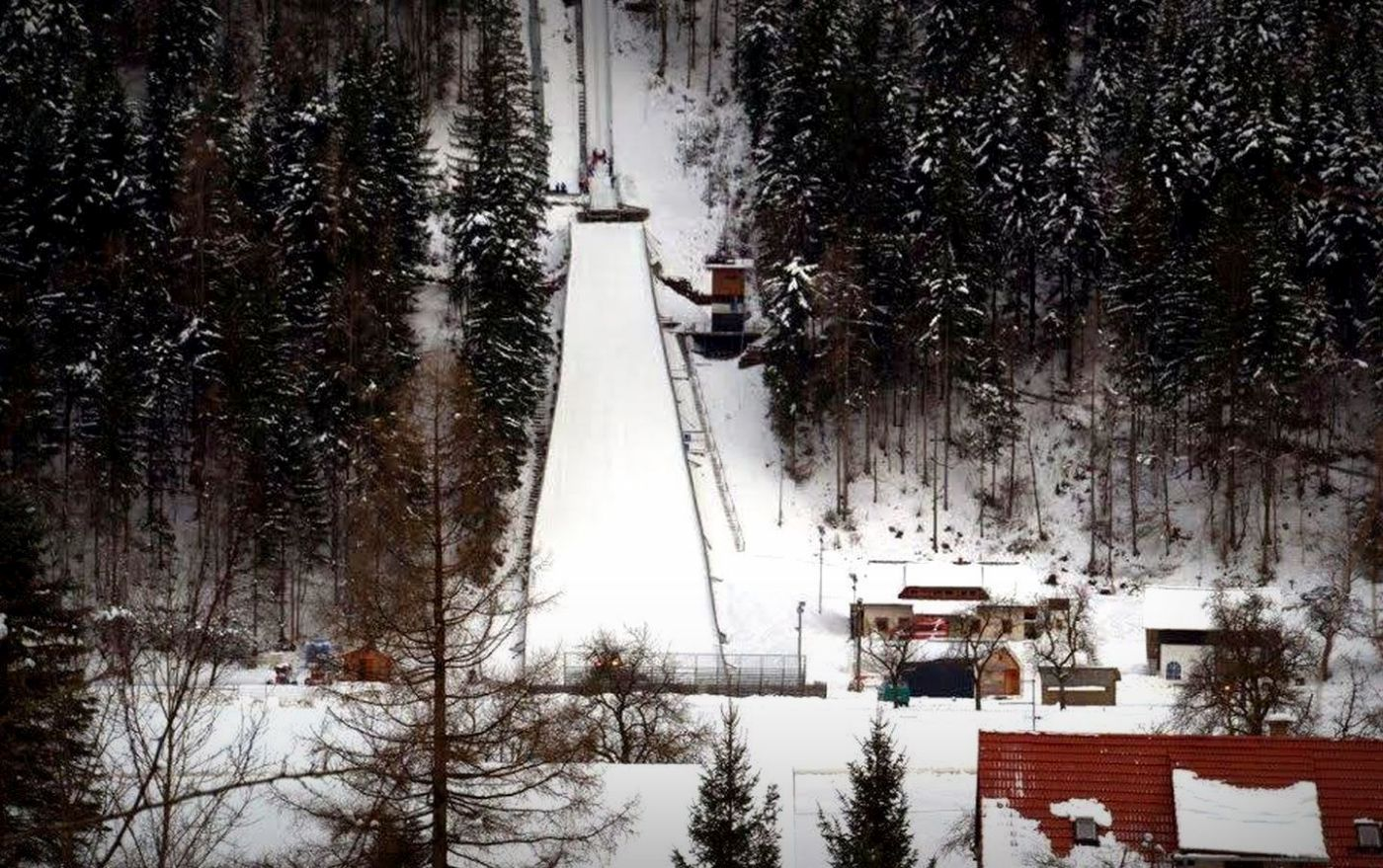
- Location: Ljubno ob Savinji, Slovenia
- Opened: 1952 (as the K60 hill)
- Renovated: 2005, 2015
- Expanded: Late 1990s (into the K80 hill)

Size
- K–point: K85
- Hill size: HS94
- Longest jump (unofficial / fall): 99 metres (325 ft) (Austria) Marita Kramer (24 January 2021)
- Hill record: 97 metres (318 ft) (Norway) Thea Minyan Bjørseth (15 February 2025)

Savina Ski Jumping Center is a ski jumping complex located in Ljubno ob Savinji, Slovenia.

== History ==
The first ski jumping competition in Ljubno was held in 1931. In 1949, the construction of the new K60 hill began. The hill was planned and constructed by Stanko Bloudek, who also constructed the Letalnica bratov Gorišek ski flying hill. The construction was completed in 1952. The smaller training hills (K18 nad K20) were constructed in 1974 and 1955, respectively. The local ski jumping club SSK Ljubno was founded in 1973. In 1983, the K20 hill was covered with plastic mate. In 2005, the venue was reconstructed according to the modern regulations set by the International Ski Federation. In 2015, the venue underwent major renovation.

As of January 2026, the venue has hosted 29 FIS Women's Ski Jumping World Cup events. Marita Kramer holds the record for the longest jump with 99 metres (325 ft), set on 24 January 2021 during a trial round.

== World Cup results ==
=== Women's ===
Date	Hillsize	Winner	Second place	Third place
11 February 2012	HS95	(United States) Sarah Hendrickson	(Japan) Sara Takanashi	(Austria) Daniela Iraschko
12 February 2012	HS95	(United States) Sarah Hendrickson	(Japan) Sara Takanashi	(Austria) Jacqueline Seifriedsberger
16 February 2013	HS95	(Japan) Sara Takanashi	(United States) Sarah Hendrickson	(France) Coline Mattel
17 February 2013	HS95	(Japan) Sara Takanashi	(France) Coline Mattel	(United States) Sarah Hendrickson
14 February 2015	HS95	(Japan) Sara Takanashi	(Austria) Daniela Iraschko-Stolz	(United States) Sarah Hendrickson
15 February 2015	HS95	(Austria) Daniela Iraschko-Stolz (Japan) Sara Takanashi		(United States) Sarah Hendrickson
13 February 2016	HS95	(Slovenia) Maja Vtič	(Japan) Sara Takanashi	(Slovenia) Špela Rogelj
14 February 2016	HS95	(Austria) Daniela Iraschko-Stolz	(Slovenia) Maja Vtič	(Austria) Chiara Hölzl
11 February 2017	HS95	(Norway) Maren Lundby	(Austria) Daniela Iraschko-Stolz	(Germany) Katharina Althaus
12 February 2017	HS95	(Germany) Katharina Althaus	(Germany) Carina Vogt	(Germany) Svenja Würth
27 January 2018	HS94	(Norway) Maren Lundby	(Germany) Katharina Althaus	(Japan) Sara Takanashi
28 January 2018	HS94	(Austria) Daniela Iraschko-Stolz	(Norway) Maren Lundby	(Germany) Katharina Althaus
8 February 2019	HS94	(Norway) Maren Lundby	(Japan) Sara Takanashi	(Slovenia) Urša Bogataj
9 February 2019 (Note: Team event)	HS94	Germany Carina Vogt; Anna Rupprecht; Juliane Seyfarth; Katharina Althaus	Slovenia Jerneja Brecl; Špela Rogelj; Nika Križnar; Urša Bogataj	Austria Jacqueline Seifriedsberger; Lisa Eder; Chiara Hölzl; Eva Pinkelnig
10 February 2019	HS94	(Japan) Sara Takanashi	(Norway) Maren Lundby	(Germany) Juliane Seyfarth
22 February 2020	HS94	Austria Daniela Iraschko-Stolz; Marita Kramer; Eva Pinkelnig; Chiara Hölzl	Slovenia Nika Križnar; Špela Rogelj; Katra Komar; Ema Klinec	Norway Anna Odine Strøm; Thea Minyan Bjørseth; Silje Opseth; Maren Lundby
23 February 2020	HS94	(Norway) Maren Lundby	(Austria) Eva Pinkelnig	(Slovenia) Nika Križnar
23 January 2021	HS94	Slovenia Ema Klinec; Špela Rogelj; Urša Bogataj; Nika Križnar	Norway Eirin Maria Kvandal; Thea Minyan Bjørseth; Silje Opseth; Maren Lundby	Austria Daniela Iraschko-Stolz; Lisa Eder; Chiara Hölzl; Marita Kramer
24 January 2021	HS94	(Norway) Eirin Maria Kvandal	(Slovenia) Ema Klinec	(Austria) Marita Kramer
31 December 2021	HS94	(Slovenia) Nika Križnar	(Austria) Marita Kramer	(Slovenia) Ema Klinec
1 January 2022	HS94	(Japan) Sara Takanashi	(Slovenia) Urša Bogataj	(Austria) Marita Kramer
31 December 2022	HS94	(Norway) Anna Odine Strøm	(Austria) Eva Pinkelnig	(Germany) Katharina Althaus
1 January 2023	HS94	(Austria) Eva Pinkelnig	(Norway) Anna Odine Strøm	(Germany) Selina Freitag
27 January 2024	HS94	(Austria) Eva Pinkelnig	(Slovenia) Nika Prevc	(Canada) Alexandria Loutitt
28 January 2024	HS94	(Slovenia) Nika Prevc	(Austria) Eva Pinkelnig	(Slovenia) Nika Križnar
15 February 2025	HS94	(Slovenia) Nika Prevc	(Germany) Selina Freitag	(Norway) Thea Minyan Bjørseth
16 February 2025	HS94	(Slovenia) Nika Prevc	(Germany) Selina Freitag	(Austria) Lisa Eder
10 January 2026	HS94	(Slovenia) Nika Prevc	(Austria) Lisa Eder	(Germany) Selina Freitag
11 January 2026	HS94	(Slovenia) Nika Prevc	(Austria) Lisa Eder	(Germany) Katharina Schmid
