= 2020 Nordic Junior World Ski Championships =

International skiing competition

FIS Nordic Junior and U23 World Ski Championships 2020
- Host city: Oberwiesenthal, Germany
- Events: 24
- Opening: 29 February
- Closing: 8 March
- Main venue: Fichtelbergschanzen; Sparkassen-Skiarena
- Website: jwsc2020.com

The FIS Nordic Junior and U23 World Ski Championships 2020 took place in Oberwiesenthal, Germany from 29 February to 8 March 2020. This was the 43rd Junior World Championships and the 15th Under-23 World Championships in Nordic skiing.

New competitions this year was mixed relay in the U23's cross-country skiing and mixed team competition in Nordic combined. The men's normal hill/5 km event in Nordic combined was removed.

== Schedule ==
All times are in Central European Time (CET).

Cross-country

Date	Time	Event
29 February	14:00	Men's junior sprint Women's junior sprint
1 March	14:00	Men's under-23 sprint Women's under-23 sprint
2 March	10:00	Women's junior 5 km classic
2 March	12:00	Men's junior 10 km classic
3 March	10:00	Women's under-23 10 km classic
3 March	12:00	Men's under-23 15 km classic
4 March	10:00	Women's junior 15 km mass start
4 March	12:00	Men's junior 30 km mass start
5 March	10:00	Women's under-23 15 km mass start
5 March	12:00	Men's under-23 30 km mass start
6 March	10:00	Women's junior 4×3.33 km relay
6 March	12:00	Men's junior 4×5 km relay
7 March	11:00	Mixed under-23 4×5 km relay

Nordic combined

Date	Time	Event
4 March	10:00; 15:00	Women's HS105 / 5 km
4 March	12:00; 16:00	Men's HS105 / 10 km
6 March	10:00; 14:00	Mixed team HS105 / 5+2.5+2.5+5 km
8 March	10:00; 14:00	Men's team HS105 / 4×5 km

Ski jumping

Date	Time	Event
5 March	15:00	Women's HS105
5 March	18:00	Men's HS105
7 March	15:00	Women's team HS105
7 March	18:00	Men's team HS105
8 March	15:00	Mixed team HS105

== Medal summary ==
=== Junior events ===
==== Cross-country skiing ====
Event	Gold		Silver		Bronze	
Men's Junior Events
Sprint freestyle	Ansgar Evensen; Norway	2:33.44	Valerio Grond; Switzerland	2:35.76	Maxim Cervinka; Germany	2:36.65
10 kilometre classical	Gus Schumacher; United States	26:31.7	Friedrich Moch; Germany	26:36.2	Davide Graz; Italy	26:38.4
30 kilometre mass start freestyle	Iver Tildheim Andersen; Norway	1:13:39.0	Friedrich Moch; Germany	1:13:48.4	Martin Kirkeberg Mørk; Norway	1:14:11.8
4 × 5 kilometre relay	United States; Luke Jager; Ben Ogden; Johnny Hagenbuch; Gus Schumacher	54:54.9	Canada; Xavier McKeever; Olivier Léveillé; Tom Stephen; Rémi Drolet	55:30.4	Italy; Michele Gasperi; Davide Graz; Giovanni Ticcò; Francesco Manzoni	55:50.3
Women's Junior Events
Sprint freestyle	Louise Lindström; Sweden	2:33.41	Izabela Marcisz; Poland	2:33.88	Siri Wigger; Switzerland	2:34.48
5 kilometre classical	Helene Marie Fossesholm; Norway	13:49.1	Lisa Lohmann; Germany	14:04.8	Izabela Marcisz; Poland	14:17.2
15 kilometre mass start freestyle	Helene Marie Fossesholm; Norway	35:55.6	Izabela Marcisz; Poland	37:04.9	Siri Wigger; Switzerland	37:06.2
4 × 3.3 kilometre relay	Switzerland; Nadja Kälin; Siri Wigger; Anja Weber; Anja Lozza	35:08.6	United States; Sydney Palmer-Leger; Kendall Kramer; Sophia Laukli; Novie McCabe	35:13.5	Sweden; Tilde Bångman; Märta Rosenberg; Tove Ericsson; Louise Lindström	35:22.8

==== Nordic combined ====
Event	Gold		Silver		Bronze	
Men's Junior Events
Individual normal hill/10 km	Jens Lurås Oftebro; Norway	24:00.1	Johannes Lamparter; Austria	25:14.5	Gaël Blondeau; France	26:05.9
Team normal hill/4 × 5 km	Austria; Stefan Rettenegger; Thomas Rettenegger; Johannes Lamparter; Fabio Obermeyr	47:23.5	France; Maël Tyrode; Edgar Vallet; Mattéo Baud; Gaël Blondeau	47:59.4	Norway; Emil Ottesen; Marius Solvik; Sebastian Østvold; Andreas Skoglund	48:01.7
Women's Junior Events
Individual normal hill/5 km	Jenny Nowak; Germany	14:12.3	Gyda Westvold Hansen; Norway	14:57.5	Lisa Hirner; Austria	15:03.5
Mixed Junior Events
Team normal hill/5+2.5+2.5+5 km	Norway; Sebastian Østvold; Marte Leinan Lund; Gyda Westvold Hansen; Andreas Skoglund	41:15.6	Germany; Christian Frank; Maria Gerboth; Jenny Nowak; David Mach	41:48.2	Japan; Daimatsu Takehana; Ayane Miyazaki; Anju Nakamura; Kodai Kimura	42:18.4

==== Ski jumping ====
Event	Gold		Silver		Bronze	
Men's Junior Events
Individual normal hill	Peter Resinger; Austria	238.3	Sander Vossan Eriksen; Norway	230.9	Mark Hafnar; Slovenia	228.5
Team normal hill	Slovenia; Žak Mogel; Jan Bombek; Jernej Presečnik; Mark Hafnar	900.3	Austria; Peter Resinger; Josef Ritzer; David Haagen; Marco Wörgötter	871.3	Germany; Luca Roth; Claudio Haas; Kilian Märkl; Philipp Raimund	833.2
Women's Junior Events
Individual normal hill	Marita Kramer; Austria	238.9	Thea Minyan Bjørseth; Norway	213.5	Lara Malsiner; Italy	211.9
Team normal hill	Austria; Lisa Eder; Vanessa Moharitsch; Julia Mühlbacher; Marita Kramer	800.7	Slovenia; Jerneja Brecl; Lara Logar; Jerneja Repinc Zupančič; Katra Komar	740.5	Germany; Michelle Göbel; Josephin Laue; Pia Kübler; Selina Freitag	708.5
Mixed Junior Events
Team normal hill	Austria; Lisa Eder; Marco Wörgötter; Marita Kramer; Peter Resinger	1023.3	Norway; Eirin Maria Kvandal; Bendik Jakobsen Heggli; Thea Minyan Bjørseth; Sander Vossan Eriksen	1021.7	Slovenia; Jerneja Brecl; Jan Bombek; Katra Komar; Mark Hafnar	986.0

=== Under-23 events ===
==== Cross-country skiing ====
Event	Gold		Silver		Bronze	
Men's Under-23 Events
Sprint freestyle	Vebjørn Hegdal; Norway	2:38.56	Mattia Armellini; Italy	2:38.81	Harald Østberg Amundsen; Norway	2:40.67
15 kilometre classical	Sergey Ardashev; Russia	36:26.4	Harald Østberg Amundsen; Norway	37:28.4	Hugo Lapalus; France	38:02.0
30 kilometre mass start freestyle	Harald Østberg Amundsen; Norway	1:12:42.0	Sergey Ardashev; Russia	1:12:49.4	Håvard Moseby; Norway	1:13:22.5
Women's Under-23 Events
Sprint freestyle	Emma Ribom; Sweden	2:36.77	Johanna Hagström; Sweden	2:37.31	Julia Kern; United States	2:37.91
10 kilometre classical	Ebba Andersson; Sweden	28:28.7	Marte Mæhlum Johansen; Norway	28:53.5	Emma Ribom; Sweden	28:58.9
15 kilometre mass start freestyle	Ebba Andersson; Sweden	35:44.4	Moa Lundgren; Sweden	36:21.5	Emma Ribom; Sweden	36:29.6
Mixed Under-23 Events
4 × 5 kilometre relay	Norway; Marte Mæhlum Johansen; Håvard Moseby; Harald Østberg Amundsen; Hedda Østberg Amundsen	54:40.5	Russia; Hristina Matsokina; Sergey Ardashev; Denis Filimonov; Nina Dubotolkina	55:07.2	Italy; Anna Comarella; Simone Daprà; Martin Coradazzi; Francesca Franchi	55:20.7

=== Medal tables ===
==== All events ====
* Host nation (Germany)

Rank	Nation	Gold	Silver	Bronze	Total
1	Norway	9	6	4	19
2	Austria	5	2	1	8
3	Sweden	4	2	3	9
4	United States	2	1	1	4
5	Germany*	1	4	3	8
6	Russia	1	2	0	3
7	Slovenia	1	1	2	4
7	Switzerland	1	1	2	4
9	Poland	0	2	1	3
10	Italy	0	1	4	5
11	France	0	1	2	3
12	Canada	0	1	0	1
13	Japan	0	0	1	1
Totals (13 entries)		24	24	24	72

==== Junior events ====
* Host nation (Germany)

Rank	Nation	Gold	Silver	Bronze	Total
1	Norway	6	4	2	12
2	Austria	5	2	1	8
3	United States	2	1	0	3
4	Germany*	1	4	3	8
5	Slovenia	1	1	2	4
5	Switzerland	1	1	2	4
7	Sweden	1	0	1	2
8	Poland	0	2	1	3
9	France	0	1	1	2
10	Canada	0	1	0	1
11	Italy	0	0	3	3
12	Japan	0	0	1	1
Totals (12 entries)		17	17	17	51

==== Under-23 events ====
Rank	Nation	Gold	Silver	Bronze	Total
1	Norway	3	2	2	7
1	Sweden	3	2	2	7
3	Russia	1	2	0	3
4	Italy	0	1	1	2
5	France	0	0	1	1
5	United States	0	0	1	1
Totals (6 entries)		7	7	7	21
