= Yamagata Zao Onsen Ski Resort =

Ski resort in Yamagata, Japan

Yamagata Zaō Onsen Ski Resort
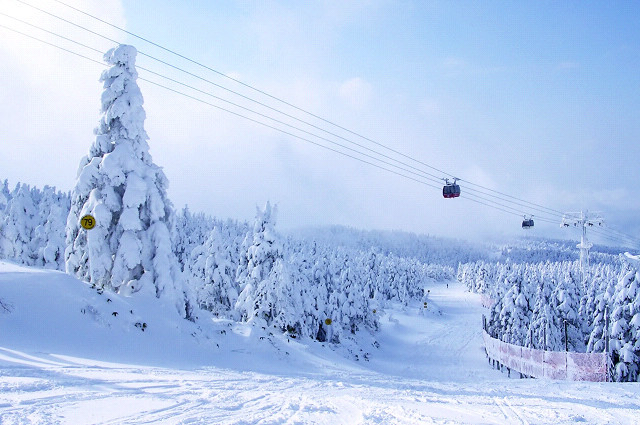
- Interactive map of Yamagata Zaō Onsen Ski Resort
- Location: Yamagata, Yamagata, Japan
- Vertical: 881 m (2,890 ft)
- Top elevation: 1,661 m (5,449 ft)
- Base elevation: 780 m (2,559 ft)
- Skiable area: 1.86 km^{2} (459.6 acres)
- Trails: 25
- Longest run: 9.0 kilometres (5.6 mi)
- Lift system: 41 (4 gondola lifts, 5 quad chairlifts, 3 triple chairlifts, 27 pair chairlifts and 2 single chairlifts)
- Website: http://www.zao-ski.or.jp/index.html

The Yamagata Zao Onsen Ski Resort (山形蔵王温泉スキー場, Yamagata Zaō Onsen Skī-jō) is the largest ski resort in Tōhoku region, Japan, operated by Zao Onsen Tourism Association (蔵王温泉観光協会, Zaō Onsen Kankō Kyōkai).

The resort is mostly famous for its ski slopes in winter, but trekking is also popular sports in summer season.

== Ski resort ==
This resort spreads out in range of Mount Jizo (地蔵岳, Jizō Dake) and consists of fourteen areas. The top of mountain is famous for soft rime which, under rare conditions, transforms trees into snow monsters. Even if you are not skier or snowboarder, you can view them via the Zaō Ropeway.

=== Courses ===
All slopes allow skiing, snowboarding, and snowscooting.

- Slopes for beginners: 28
- Slopes for intermediate skiers: 19
- Slopes for advanced skiers: 10
- Total: 57

== Zaō Jump Stadium in Yamagata ==
Zaō Jump Stadium in Yamagata
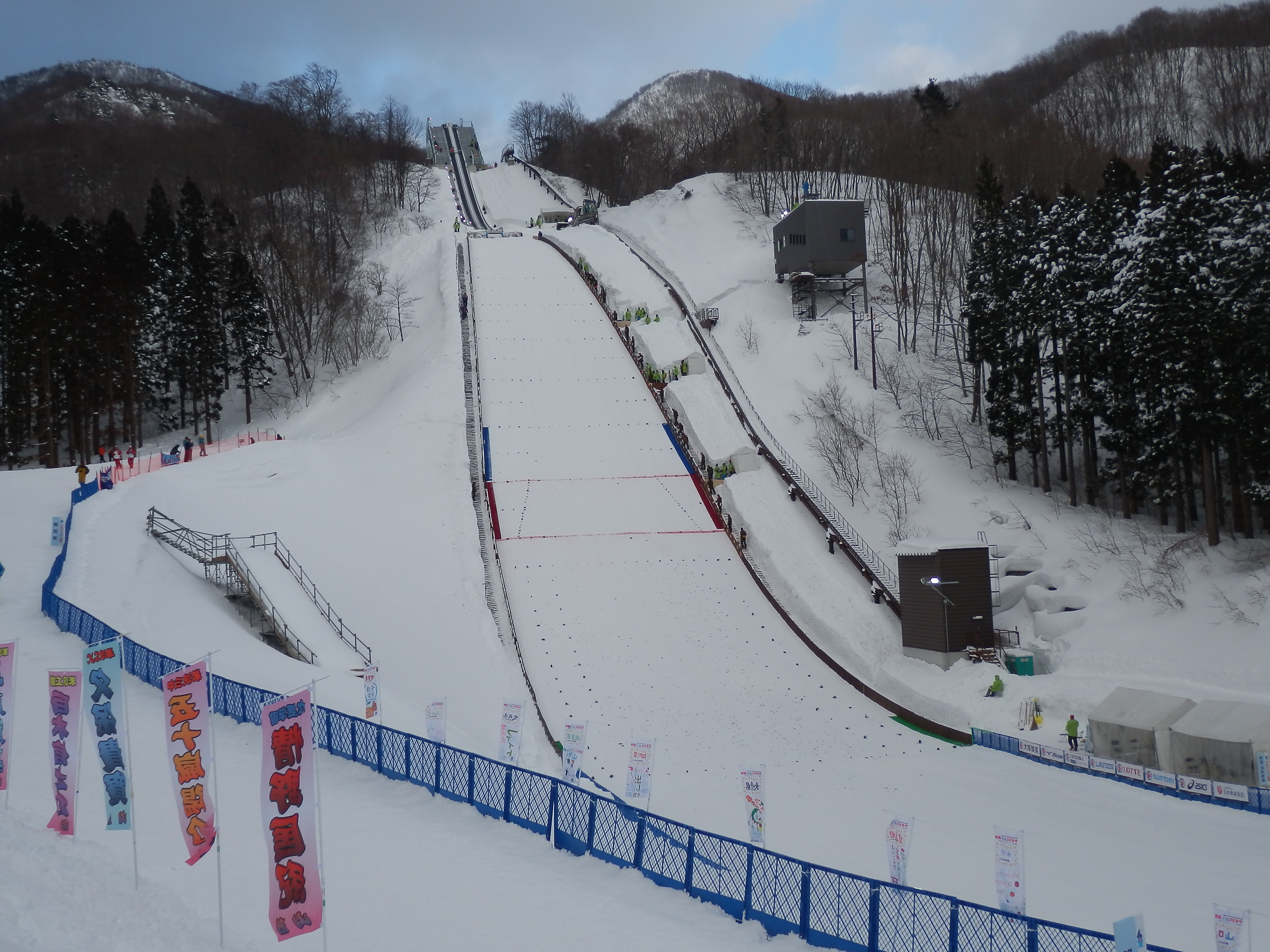
- Zaō Jump Stadium in Yamagata
- Location: Yanagihira 768, Zaoonsen, Yamagata-shi, Yamagata; Yamagata, Yamagata; Japan
- Coordinates: 38°10′26″N 140°23′53.5″E
- Operator: Zao Onsen Tourism Association
- Opened: 1979
- Renovated: 1999, 2013

Size
- K–point: 90 m
- Hill size: 100 m
- Hill record: 102.5 metres (336 ft); Sara Takanashi

Zaō Jump Stadium in Yamagata (山形市蔵王ジャンプ台, Yamagata-shi Zaō Jampu-dai) is an FIS certified ski jumping stadium. It is located between the slopes of Kami-no-dai and Ryūzan.

It was built for the Inter skiing Zaō tournament of 1979. In March 2012, the FIS Women's Ski Jumping World Cup was held in Japan for the first time and has been organized every year since then.

=== Events ===
| Date | Hillsize | Competition | Winner | Second | Third |
|---|---|---|---|---|---|
| 3 March 2012 | HS100 | WC | (United States) Sarah Hendrickson | (Japan) Sara Takanashi | (Austria) Daniela Iraschko |
| (Note: Rescheduled from Szczyrk cancelled event in Poland on 28 Jan 2012.)3 March 2012 | HS100 | WC | (Japan) Sara Takanashi | (United States) Sarah Hendrickson | (Germany) Ulrike Gräßler |
| 4 March 2012 | HS100 | WC | (United States) Sarah Hendrickson | (Japan) Sara Takanashi | (Austria) Daniela Iraschko |
| 9 February 2013 | HS100 | WC | strong wind; first event next day | | |
| 10 February 2013 | HS100 | WC | (Japan) Sara Takanashi | (Austria) Jacqueline Seifriedsberger | (Germany) Carina Vogt |
| 10 February 2013 | HS100 | WC | (Japan) Sara Takanashi | (Austria) Jacqueline Seifriedsberger | (United States) Sarah Hendrickson |
| 18 January 2014 | HS100 | WC | (Japan) Sara Takanashi | (Japan) Yūki Itō | (Germany) Carina Vogt |
| 19 January 2014 | HS100 | WC | (Japan) Sara Takanashi | (Germany) Carina Vogt | (Switzerland) Bigna Windmüller |
| 17 January 2015 | HS100 | WC | strong wind; scheduled on morning next day | | |
| 18 January 2015 | HS100 | WC | rescheduled from yesterday; wind and snow | | |
| 18 January 2015 | HS100 | WC | (Germany) Carina Vogt | (Russia) Irina Avvakumova | (Slovenia) Špela Rogelj |
| 22 January 2016 | HS100 | WC | (Japan) Sara Takanashi | (Austria) Daniela Iraschko-Stolz | (Slovenia) Maja Vtič |
| 23 January 2016 | HS100 | WC | (Japan) Sara Takanashi | (Slovenia) Maja Vtič | (Slovenia) Ema Klinec |
| 20 January 2017 | HS103 | WC | (Japan) Yūki Itō | (Italy) Manuela Malsiner | (Russia) Irina Avvakumova |
| 21 January 2017 | HS103 | WC | (Japan) Yūki Itō | (Japan) Sara Takanashi | (Norway) Maren Lundby |
| 19 January 2018 | HS102 | WC | (Norway) Maren Lundby | (Austria) Chiara Hölzl | (Russia) Irina Avvakumova |
| 20 January 2018 | HS102 | WC; Team event | Japan Kaori Iwabuchi; Yūka Setō; Yūki Itō; Sara Takanashi | Slovenia Urša Bogataj; Špela Rogelj; Ema Klinec; Nika Križnar | Russia Anastasiya Barannikova; Alexandra Kustova; Sofia Tikhonova; Irina Avvakumova |
| 21 January 2018 | HS102 | WC | (Norway) Maren Lundby | (Japan) Yūki Itō | (Japan) Sara Takanashi |

== Others ==
There is Zaō Onsen in the foot of this resort, and there are about 120 accommodations.

== See also ==
- List of ski areas and resorts in Japan
