= Žiga Jelar =

Slovenian ski jumper (born 1997)

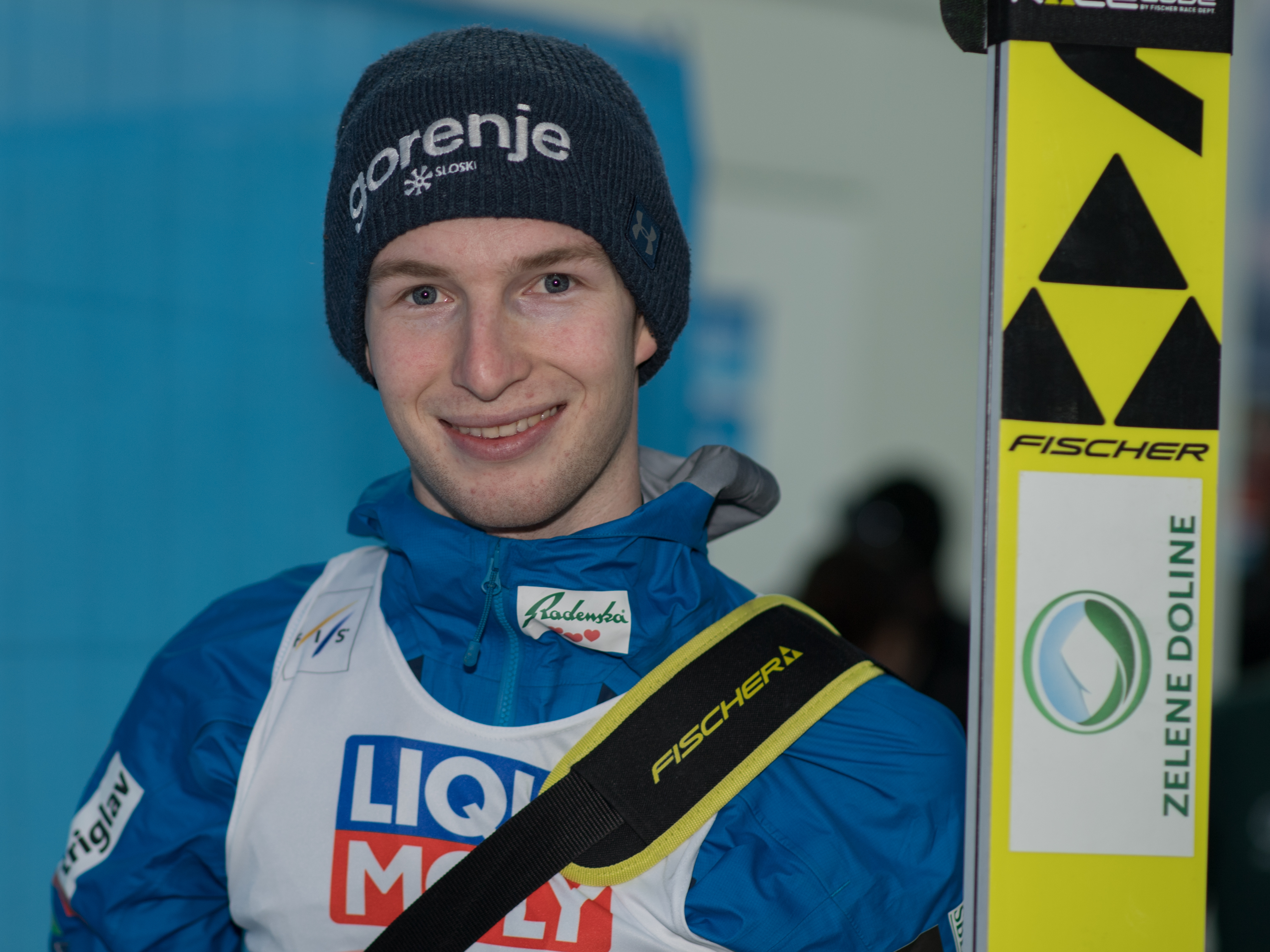
- Jelar in 2019

Personal information
- Born: 22 October 1997 (age 29) Kranj, Slovenia

Sport
- Sport: Ski jumping
- Club: SK Triglav Kranj

World Cup career
- Seasons: 2016, 2018–present
- Indiv. starts: 109
- Indiv. podiums: 4
- Indiv. wins: 1
- Team starts: 11
- Team podiums: 5
- Team wins: 1
- Ski Flying titles: 1 (2022)

Achievements and titles
- Personal bests: 239 m (784 ft); Planica, 25 March 2022
Medal record
Men's ski jumping
Representing Slovenia
World Championships
Gold medal – first place	2023 Planica	Team LH
- Updated on 29 March 2026

Žiga Jelar (born 22 October 1997) is a Slovenian ski jumper and singer.

== World Cup results ==
=== Standings ===
Season	Overall	4H	SF	RA
2015–16	—	—	—	—
2017–18	44	17	42	—
2018–19	54	—	—	69
2019–20	28	—	17	4
2020–21	25	25	12	N/A
2021–22	20	42	1st place, gold medalist(s)	19
2022–23	17	21	16	17
2023–24	62	—	—	—
2024–25	63	36	—	—
2025–26	—	—	—	N/A

=== Individual wins ===
No.	Season	Date	Location	Hill	Size
1	2021–22	25 March 2022	(Slovenia) Planica	Letalnica bratov Gorišek HS240	FH

=== Individual starts ===
winner (1); second (2); third (3); did not compete (–); failed to qualify (q)
Season	1	2	3	4	5	6	7	8	9	10	11	12	13	14	15	16	17	18	19	20	21	22	23	24	25	26	27	28	29	30	31	32	Points
2015–16	Klingenthal	Lillehammer	Lillehammer	Nizhny Tagil	Nizhny Tagil	Engelberg	Engelberg	Oberstdorf	Garmisch-Partenkirchen	Innsbruck	Bischofshofen	Willingen	Zakopane	Sapporo	Sapporo	Trondheim	Vikersund	Vikersund	Vikersund	Lahti	Lahti	Kuopio	Almaty	Almaty	Wisła	Wisła	Titisee-Neustadt	Titisee-Neustadt	Planica	Planica			0
2015–16	–	–	–	–	–	–	–	–	–	–	–	–	–	–	–	–	–	–	–	–	–	43	–	–	–	–	–	–	–	–			0
2017–18	Wisła	Ruka	Nizhny Tagil	Nizhny Tagil	Titisee-Neustadt	Engelberg	Engelberg	Oberstdorf	Garmisch-Partenkirchen	Innsbruck	Bischofshofen	Tauplitz	Zakopane	Willingen	Willingen	Lahti	Oslo	Lillehammer	Trondheim	Vikersund	Planica	Planica											43
2017–18	–	–	–	–	–	–	–	19	21	27	21	35	36	40	32	–	–	–	–	–	24	–											43
2018–19	Wisła	Ruka	Ruka	Nizhny Tagil	Nizhny Tagil	Engelberg	Engelberg	Oberstdorf	Garmisch-Partenkirchen	Innsbruck	Bischofshofen	Val di Fiemme	Val di Fiemme	Zakopane	Sapporo	Sapporo	Oberstdorf	Oberstdorf	Oberstdorf	Lahti	Willingen	Willingen	Oslo	Lillehammer	Trondheim	Vikersund	Planica	Planica					17
2018–19	–	–	–	–	–	–	–	–	–	–	–	–	–	–	25	32	35	31	37	38	25	26	33	q	–	–	37	–					17
2019–20	Wisła	Ruka	Nizhny Tagil	Nizhny Tagil	Klingenthal	Engelberg	Engelberg	Oberstdorf	Garmisch-Partenkirchen	Innsbruck	Bischofshofen	Val di Fiemme	Val di Fiemme	Titisee-Neustadt	Titisee-Neustadt	Zakopane	Sapporo	Sapporo	Willingen	Tauplitz	Tauplitz	Râșnov	Râșnov	Lahti	Lahti	Oslo	Lillehammer						200
2019–20	–	–	–	–	–	–	–	–	–	–	–	–	–	–	–	–	–	–	17	23	14	12	8	20	27	20	2						200
2020–21	Wisła	Ruka	Ruka	Nizhny Tagil	Nizhny Tagil	Engelberg	Engelberg	Oberstdorf	Garmisch-Partenkirchen	Innsbruck	Bischofshofen	Titisee-Neustadt	Titisee-Neustadt	Zakopane	Lahti	Willingen	Willingen	Klingenthal	Klingenthal	Zakopane	Zakopane	Râșnov	Planica	Planica	Planica								207
2020–21	38	13	13	24	26	–	–	10	40	35	27	39	26	22	41	18	12	29	33	37	39	15	17	12	12								207
2021–22	Nizhny Tagil	Nizhny Tagil	Ruka	Ruka	Wisła	Klingenthal	Klingenthal	Engelberg	Engelberg	Oberstdorf	Garmisch-Partenkirchen	Bischofshofen	Bischofshofen	Bischofshofen	Zakopane	Titisee-Neustadt	Titisee-Neustadt	Willingen	Willingen	Lahti	Lahti	Lillehammer	Oslo	Oslo	Oberstdorf	Oberstdorf	Planica	Planica					389
2021–22	–	–	–	–	–	–	–	–	–	36	q	45	29	25	19	16	30	7	35	27	9	24	27	28	2	4	1	6					389
2022–23	Wisła	Wisła	Ruka	Ruka	Titisee-Neustadt	Titisee-Neustadt	Engelberg	Engelberg	Oberstdorf	Garmisch-Partenkirchen	Innsbruck	Bischofshofen	Zakopane	Sapporo	Sapporo	Sapporo	Tauplitz	Tauplitz	Willingen	Willingen	Lake Placid	Lake Placid	Râșnov	Oslo	Oslo	Lillehammer	Lillehammer	Vikersund	Vikersund	Lahti	Planica	Planica	498
2022–23	43	41	24	41	16	20	12	16	28	34	21	15	16	18	q	28	7	16	11	5	12	9	2	17	42	7	24	22	20	–	–	6	498
2023–24	Ruka	Ruka	Lillehammer	Lillehammer	Klingenthal	Klingenthal	Engelberg	Engelberg	Oberstdorf	Garmisch-Partenkirchen	Innsbruck	Bischofshofen	Wisła	Zakopane	Willingen	Willingen	Lake Placid	Lake Placid	Sapporo	Sapporo	Oberstdorf	Oberstdorf	Lahti	Lahti	Oslo	Oslo	Trondheim	Trondheim	Vikersund	Vikersund	Planica	Planica	7
2023–24	29	31	31	26	–	–	–	–	–	–	–	–	–	–	–	–	–	–	–	–	–	–	–	–	–	–	–	–	–	–	q	–	7

== Music career ==
Jelar, who sings and plays guitar and accordion, began uploading music to YouTube and Spotify in 2019. In 2023, he released his first album, Brez pravil.
