= Eva Pinkelnig =

Austrian ski jumper (born 1988)

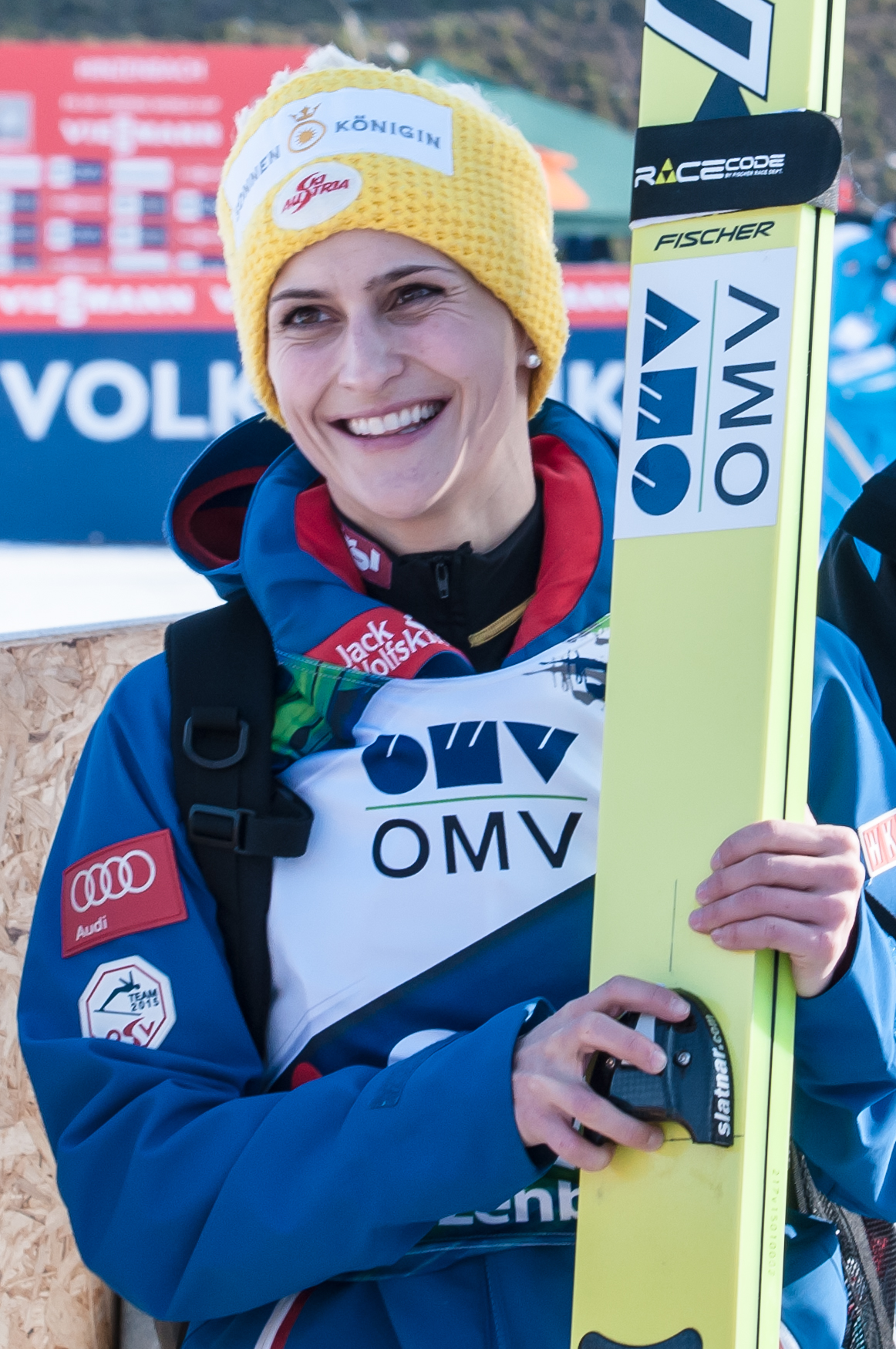
- Pinkelnig in 2015

Personal information
- Nationality: Austria
- Born: 27 May 1988 (age 38) Dornbirn, Austria
- Height: 1.59 m (5 ft 3 in)

Sport
- Sport: Skiing
- Club: WSV-Tschagguns

World Cup career
- Seasons: 2015–present
- Indiv. starts: 149
- Indiv. podiums: 46
- Indiv. wins: 16
- Team starts: 11
- Team podiums: 11
- Team wins: 4

Achievements and titles
- Personal bests: 191 m (627 ft); Vikersund, 19 March 2023
Medal record
Women's ski jumping
Representing Austria
World Championships
Silver medal – second place	2019 Seefeld	Team NH
Silver medal – second place	2019 Seefeld	Mixed team NH
Silver medal – second place	2023 Planica	Individual NH
Silver medal – second place	2023 Planica	Team NH
Silver medal – second place	2025 Trondheim	Team NH
Bronze medal – third place	2025 Trondheim	Mixed team LH
- Updated on 6 January 2025

Eva Pinkelnig (born 27 May 1988) is an Austrian ski jumper.

== Career ==
She competed in the 2015 World Cup season. She represented Austria at the FIS Nordic World Ski Championships 2015 in Falun.

== Major tournament results ==
=== FIS World Nordic Ski Championships ===
Year	Place	NH	LH	Team NH	Mixed NH
2019	(Austria) Seefeld	5	N/A	2nd place, silver medalist(s)	2nd place, silver medalist(s)
2021	(Germany) Oberstdorf	31	N/A	N/A	N/A
2023	(Slovenia) Planica	2nd place, silver medalist(s)	6	2nd place, silver medalist(s)	4

== World Cup ==
=== Standings ===
Season	Overall	ST	AK	L3	RA	BB
2014/15	7	N/A	N/A	N/A	N/A	N/A
2015/16	15	N/A	N/A	N/A	N/A	N/A
2016/17	60	N/A	N/A	N/A	N/A	N/A
2017/18	43	N/A	N/A	—	N/A	N/A
2018/19	6	N/A	N/A	N/A	5	9
2019/20	3rd place, bronze medalist(s)	N/A	N/A	N/A	3rd place, bronze medalist(s)	N/A
2020/21	27	N/A	N/A	N/A	N/A	—
2021/22	15	9	9	N/A	16	N/A
2022/23	1st place, gold medalist(s)	1st place, gold medalist(s)	N/A	N/A	9	N/A
2023/24	2nd place, silver medalist(s)	N/A	N/A	N/A	2nd place, silver medalist(s)	N/A

=== Wins ===
No.	Season	Date	Location	Hill	Size
1	2019/20	12 January 2020	(Japan) Sapporo	Ōkurayama HS137	LH
2	2019/20	17 January 2020	(Japan) Zaō	Yamagata HS102 (night)	NH
3	2019/20	19 January 2020	(Japan) Zaō	Yamagata HS102 (night)	NH
4	2022/23	6 November 2022	(Poland) Wisła	Malinka HS134	LH
5	2022/23	28 December 2022	(Austria) Villach	Villacher Alpenarena HS98	NH
6	2022/23	29 December 2022	(Austria) Villach	Villacher Alpenarena HS98	NH
7	2022/23	1 January 2023	(Slovenia) Ljubno	Savina Ski Jumping Center HS94	NH
8	2022/23	15 January 2023	(Japan) Zaō	Yamagata HS150	NH
9	2022/23	10 February 2023	(Austria) Hinzenbach	Aigner-Schanze HS90	NH
10	2023/24	1 January 2024	(Germany) Oberstdorf	Schattenberg HS137	LH
11	2023/24	13 January 2024	(Japan) Sapporo	Ōkurayama HS137	LH
12	2023/24	27 January 2024	(Slovenia) Ljubno	Savina Ski Jumping Center HS94	NH
13	2023/24	24 February 2024	(Austria) Hinzenbach	Aigner-Schanze HS90	NH
14	2023/24	25 February 2024	(Austria) Hinzenbach	Aigner-Schanze HS90	NH
15	2023/24	21 March 2024	(Slovenia) Planica	Srednja skakalnica HS102	NH
16	2024/25	6 January 2025	(Austria) Villach	Alpenarena HS98	NH
