= FIS Nordic World Ski Championships 2023 – Women's team normal hill =

Women's team normal hill at the FIS Nordic World Ski Championships 2023
- Venue: Srednja skakalnica (HS102)
- Location: Planica, Slovenia
- Dates: 25 February
- Competitors: 40 from 10 nations
- Teams: 10
- Winning points: 843.8

Medalists
gold medal	Anna Rupprecht; Luisa Görlich; Selina Freitag; Katharina Althaus	Germany
silver medal	Chiara Kreuzer; Julia Mühlbacher; Jacqueline Seifriedsberger; Eva Pinkelnig	Austria
bronze medal	Maren Lundby; Eirin Maria Kvandal; Thea Minyan Bjørseth; Anna Odine Strøm	Norway

The Women's team normal hill competition at the FIS Nordic World Ski Championships 2023 was held on 25 February 2023.

== Results ==
The first round was started at 12:15 and the final round at 13:17.

Rank	Bib	Country	Round 1			Final round			Total
Rank	Bib	Country	Distance (m)	Points	Rank	Distance (m)	Points	Rank	Points
1st place, gold medalist(s)	9	Germany; Anna Rupprecht; Luisa Görlich; Selina Freitag; Katharina Althaus	92.5; 87.5; 91.0; 97.0	401.0; 104.8; 86.0; 100.6; 109.6	1	99.0; 92.5; 97.0; 94.5	442.8; 114.9; 101.6; 116.4; 109.9	1	843.8
2nd place, silver medalist(s)	10	Austria; Chiara Kreuzer; Julia Mühlbacher; Jacqueline Seifriedsberger; Eva Pinkelnig	89.5; 93.0; 84.0; 97.0	393.7; 103.0; 97.0; 87.3; 106.4	3	95.0; 96.5; 89.5; 98.0	437.4; 110.0; 110.7; 99.2; 117.5	2	831.1
3rd place, bronze medalist(s)	8	Norway; Maren Lundby; Eirin Maria Kvandal; Thea Minyan Bjørseth; Anna Odine Strøm	89.0; 91.5; 91.0; 99.0	399.5; 100.6; 88.4; 104.5; 106.0	2	95.0; 91.5; 93.5; 95.0	429.1; 107.9; 100.4; 108.7; 112.1	3	828.6
4	7	Slovenia; Maja Vtič; Ema Klinec; Nika Prevc; Nika Križnar	88.0; 92.5; 88.5; 98.0	392.3; 93.7; 99.8; 92.7; 106.1	4	94.0; 94.0; 92.0; 96.0	426.8; 101.0; 108.9; 105.3; 111.6	4	819.1
5	6	Japan; Nozomi Maruyama; Yūka Setō; Ringo Miyajima; Yūki Itō	92.5; 89.5; 89.5; 95.5	388.7; 101.3; 90.6; 89.4; 107.4	5	98.0; 89.0; 93.0; 96.5	415.5; 109.2; 93.4; 101.0; 111.9	5	804.2
6	5	Canada; Natalie Eilers; Abigail Strate; Nicole Maurer; Alexandria Loutitt	79.5; 87.5; 78.5; 97.5	329.8; 76.1; 86.1; 63.4; 104.2	6	88.0; 92.0; 81.0; 97.5	375.4; 89.6; 98.6; 73.7; 113.5	6	705.2
7	4	France; Lilou Zepchi; Julia Clair; Emma Chervet; Joséphine Pagnier	69.0; 89.5; 77.5; 91.5	313.6; 62.2; 91.9; 64.3; 95.2	7	82.5; 91.0; 80.5; 88.5	358.0; 79.0; 98.7; 76.8; 103.5	7	671.6
8	2	China; Wang Liangyao; Li Xueyao; Peng Qingyue; Liu Qi	82.0; 84.0; 76.0; 87.5	300.7; 77.1; 75.7; 66.4; 81.5	8	83.5; 87.5; 86.0; 78.5	330.9; 81.0; 86.2; 81.0; 82.7	8	631.6
9	1	Poland; Kinga Rajda; Paulina Cieślar; Anna Twardosz; Nicole Konderla	79.0; 73.5; 75.0; 82.5	277.6; 81.8; 59.7; 64.3; 71.8	9	Did not qualify			
10	3	United States; Samantha Macuga; Josie Johnson; Paige Jones; Annika Belshaw	74.0; 79.0; 81.5; DSQ	205.1; 68.9; 62.5; 73.7 –	10	Did not qualify			
