= Chiara Kreuzer =

Austrian ski jumper (born 1997)

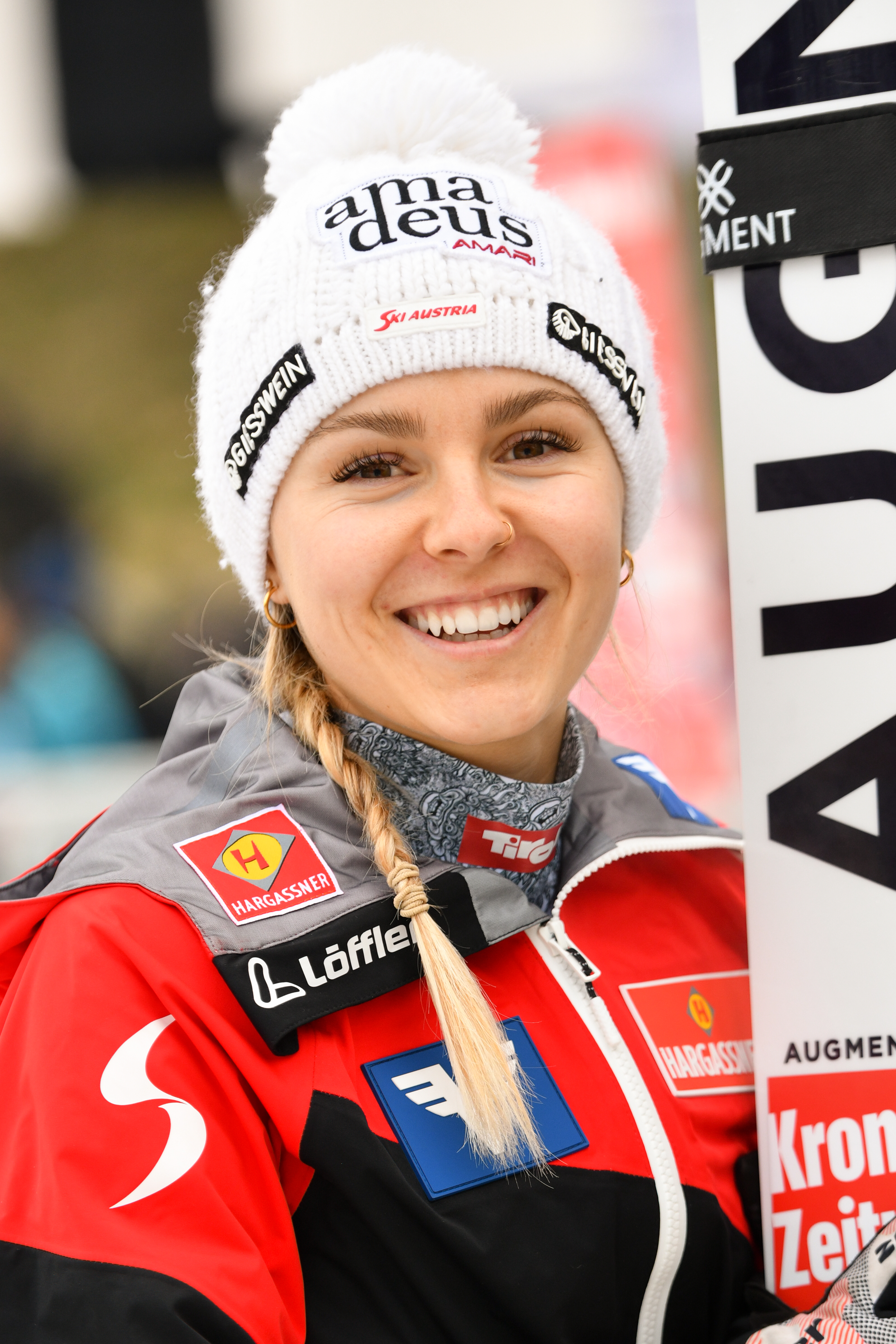

Personal information
- Nationality: Austria
- Born: 18 July 1997 (age 29) Schwarzach im Pongau, Austria
- Height: 153 cm (5 ft 0 in)

Sport
- Sport: Skiing
- Club: SV Schwarzach

World Cup career
- Seasons: 2013–present
- Indiv. starts: 194
- Indiv. podiums: 20
- Indiv. wins: 8
- Team starts: 10
- Team podiums: 8
- Team wins: 4

Achievements and titles
- Personal bests: 188 m (617 ft); Vikersund, 19 March 2023
Medal record
Women's ski jumping
Representing Austria
World Championships
Gold medal – first place	2021 Oberstdorf	Team NH
Silver medal – second place	2013 Val di Fiemme	Mixed team NH
Silver medal – second place	2019 Seefeld	Team NH
Silver medal – second place	2023 Planica	Team NH
- Updated on 21 March 2024

Chiara Kreuzer (née Hölzl; born 18 July 1997) is an Austrian ski jumper.

== Career ==
Kreuzer's debut in the FIS Ski Jumping World Cup took place in 2012 in Lillehammer.

Her individual best result is an 11th place at the 2018 Winter Olympic Games. At the 2013 FIS Nordic World Ski Championships in Val di Fiemme, Kreuzer won the silver medal with the Austrian team (Gregor Schlierenzauer, Thomas Morgenstern, and Jacqueline Seifriedsberger) in the mixed event at the normal hill competition.

She competed in the Winter Olympic Games in both 2014 and 2018.

== World Cup ==
=== Standings ===
Season	Overall	ST	AK	L3	RA	BB
2012/13	51	N/A	N/A	N/A	N/A	N/A
2013/14	33	N/A	N/A	N/A	N/A	N/A
2014/15	18	N/A	N/A	N/A	N/A	N/A
2015/16	5	N/A	N/A	N/A	N/A	N/A
2016/17	13	N/A	N/A	N/A	N/A	N/A
2017/18	8	N/A	N/A	15	N/A	N/A
2018/19	10	N/A	N/A	22	8	4
2019/20	2nd place, silver medalist(s)	N/A	N/A	N/A	5	N/A
2020/21	10	N/A	N/A	N/A	N/A	6
2021/22	18	—	21	N/A	7	N/A
2022/23	23	11	N/A	N/A	6	N/A
2023/24	21	N/A	N/A	N/A	25	N/A

=== Wins ===
No.	Season	Date	Location	Hill	Size
1	2019/20	14 December 2019	(Germany) Klingenthal	Vogtland Arena HS140	LH
2	2019/20	25 January 2020	(Romania) Râșnov	Trambulina Valea Cărbunării HS97	NH
3	2019/20	1 February 2020	(Germany) Oberstdorf	Schattenbergschanze HS137	LH
4	2019/20	2 February 2020	(Germany) Oberstdorf	Schattenbergschanze HS137	LH
5	2019/20	8 February 2020	(Austria) Hinzenbach	Aigner-Schanze HS90	NH
6	2019/20	9 February 2020	(Austria) Hinzenbach	Aigner-Schanze HS90	NH
7	2022/23	11 February 2023	(Austria) Hinzenbach	Aigner-Schanze HS90	NH
8	2022/23	11 March 2023	(Norway) Oslo	Holmenkollbakken HS134	LH
