= Urša Bogataj =

Slovenian ski jumper (born 1995)

Urša Križnar
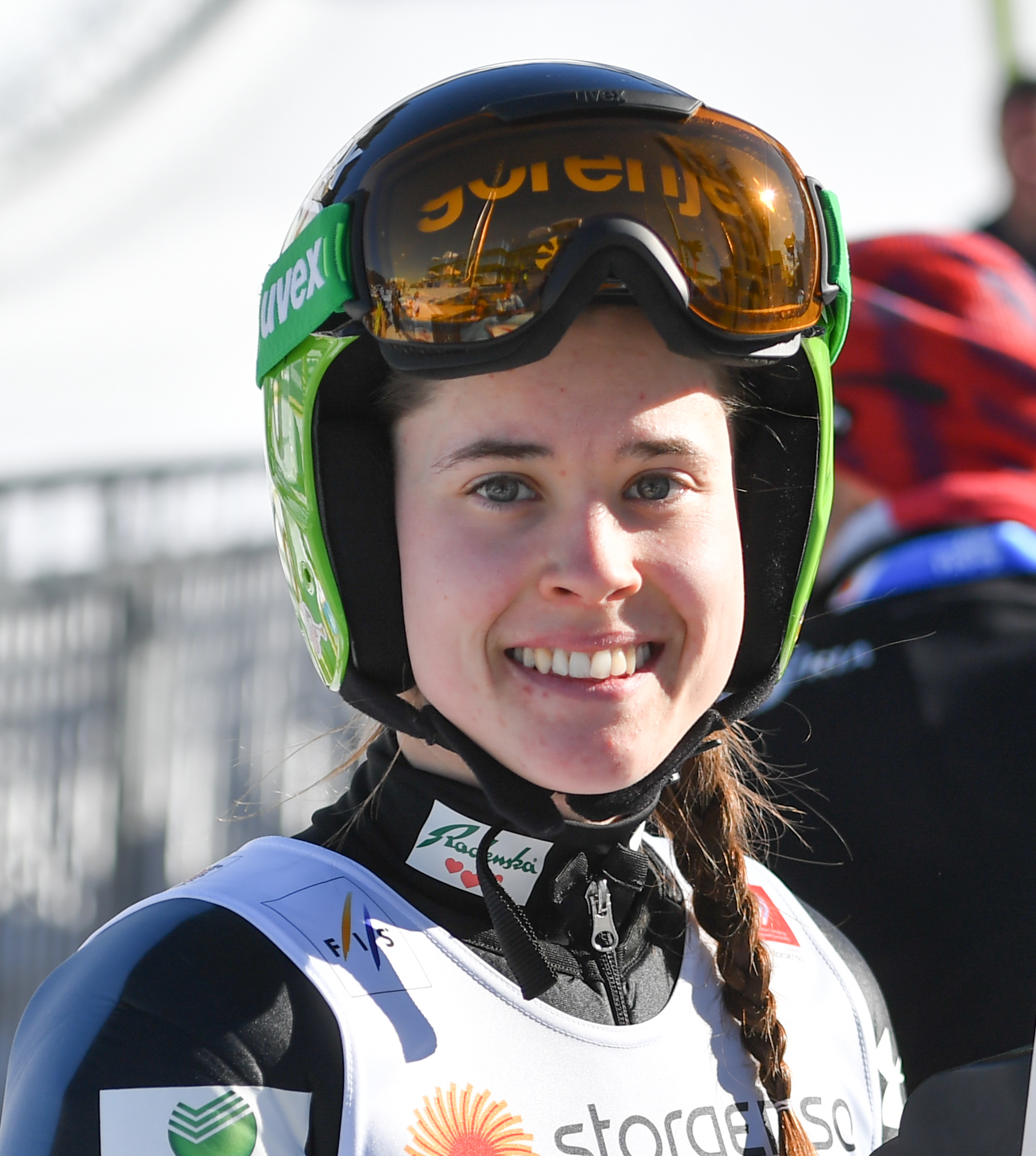
- Križnar in 2019

Personal information
- Born: 7 March 1995 (age 31) Ljubljana, Slovenia
- Height: 1.67 m (5 ft 6 in)

Sport
- Sport: Ski jumping

World Cup career
- Seasons: 2012–2023
- Indiv. starts: 168
- Indiv. podiums: 14
- Indiv. wins: 3
- Team starts: 9
- Team podiums: 7
- Team wins: 3
Medal record
Women's ski jumping
Olympic Games
Gold medal – first place	2022 Beijing	Individual NH
Gold medal – first place	2022 Beijing	Mixed team
World Championships
Silver medal – second place	2021 Oberstdorf	Team NH

Urša Križnar (née Bogataj; born 7 March 1995) is a Slovenian former ski jumper. She was the 2022 Olympic champion in the women's normal hill individual event.

Bogataj injured her knee in 2022 and stopped competing, and then officially retired in February 2025.

== Major tournament results ==
=== Winter Olympics ===
Year	Place	Normal	Mixed
2018	(South Korea) Pyeongchang	30	N/A
2022	(China) Beijing	1st place, gold medalist(s)	1st place, gold medalist(s)

=== FIS Nordic World Ski Championships ===
Year	Place	Individual		Team	
Year	Place	Normal	Large	Women	Mixed
2013	(Italy) Predazzo	17	N/A	N/A	8
2019	(Austria) Seefeld	8	N/A	4	4
2021	(Germany) Oberstdorf	13	11	2nd place, silver medalist(s)	—

== World Cup results ==
=== Overall standings ===
Season	Position	Points
2011–12	30	75
2012–13	14	338
2013–14	21	220
2014–15	28	91
2015–16	19	235
2016–17	22	165
2017–18	9	386
2018–19	11	627
2019–20	31	53
2020–21	16	232
2021–22	3	1,151
2022–23	23	249

=== Individual wins ===
No.	Season	Date	Location	Hill	Size
1	2021–22	26 February 2022	(Austria) Hinzenbach	Aigner-Schanze HS90	NH
2	2021–22	12 March 2022	(Germany) Oberhof	Kanzlersgrund HS100	NH
3	2021–22	13 March 2022	(Germany) Oberhof	Kanzlersgrund HS100	NH
