= Aleksandra Kustova =

Russian ski jumper (born 1998)

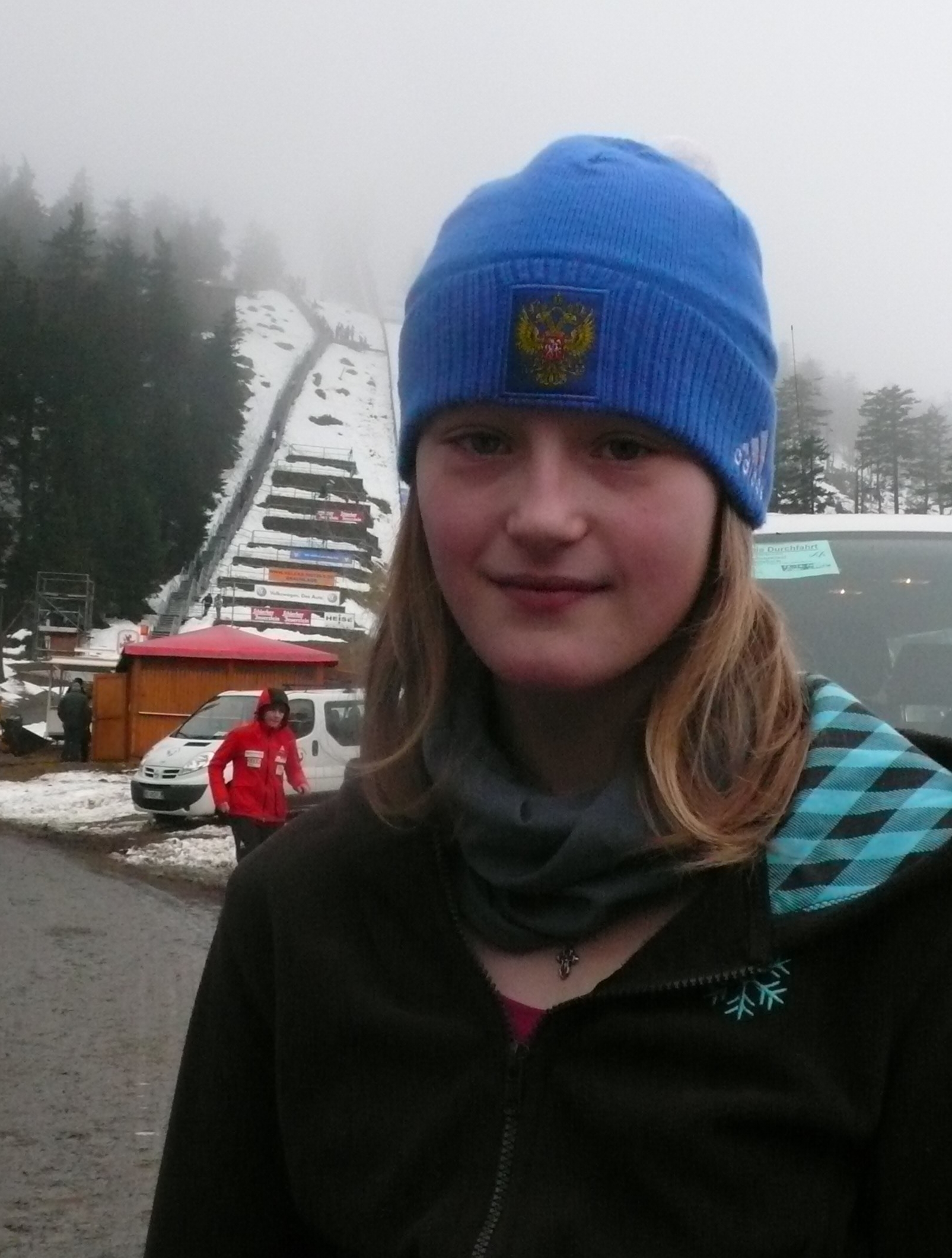
- Kustova in 2010

Personal information
- Nationality: Russia
- Born: 26 August 1998 (age 27) Magadan, Russia
- Height: 171 cm (5 ft 7 in)

Sport
- Sport: Skiing

Aleksandra Kustova (Russian: Александра Кустова, born 26 August 1998) is a Russian ski jumper.

She competed at the 2018 Winter Olympics and the 2022 Winter Olympics.
