= Marita Kramer =

Dutch-born Austrian ski jumper (born 2001)

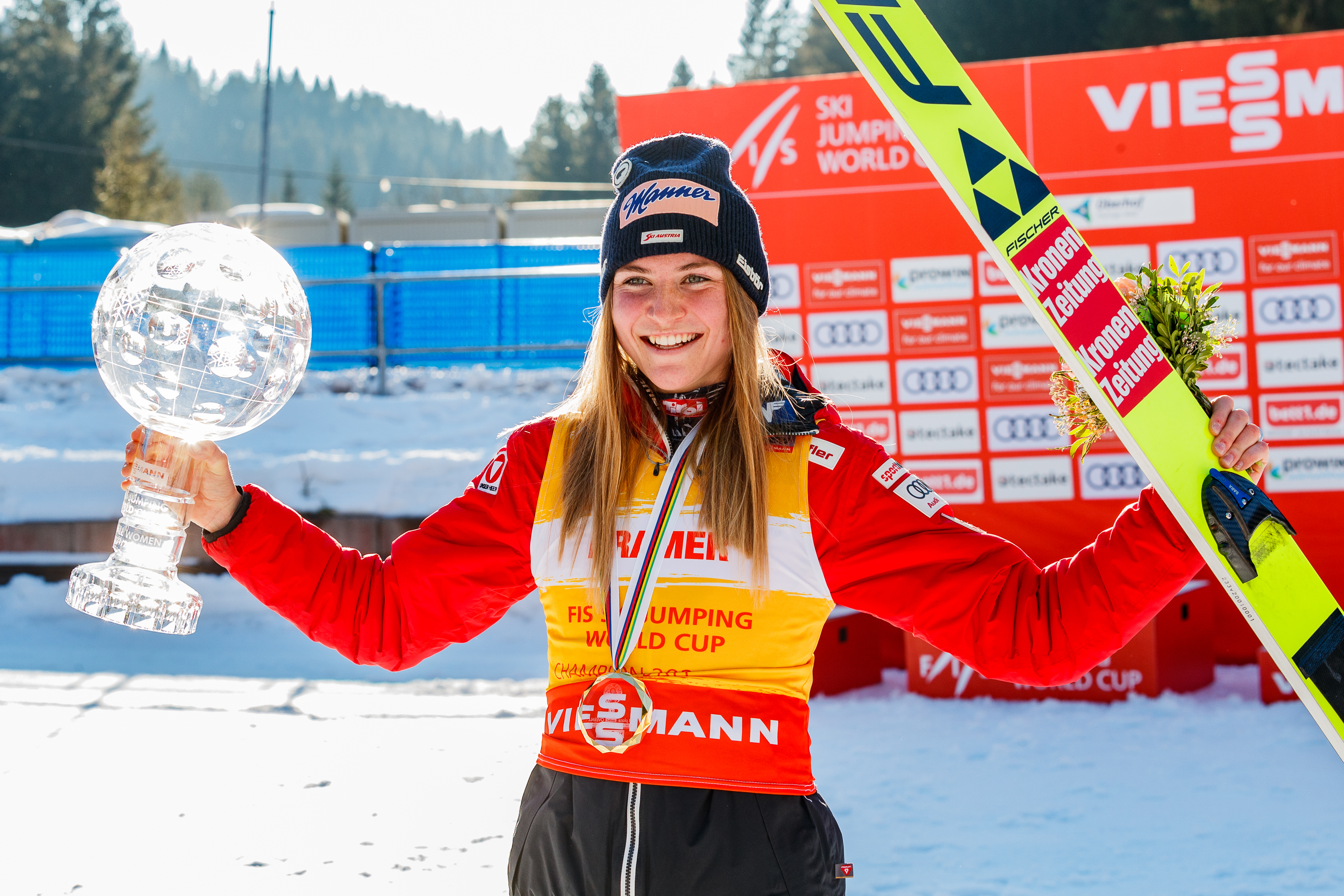

Personal information
- Full name: Sara Marita Kramer
- Nationality: Austria
- Born: 25 October 2001 (age 24) Apeldoorn, Netherlands

Sport
- Sport: Skiing
- Club: SK Saalfelden

World Cup career
- Seasons: 2017; 2019–2025
- Indiv. starts: 89
- Indiv. podiums: 23
- Indiv. wins: 15
- Team starts: 7
- Team podiums: 7
- Team wins: 4
Medal record
Women's ski jumping
Representing Austria
World Championships
Gold medal – first place	2021 Oberstdorf	Team NH
Bronze medal – third place	2021 Oberstdorf	Mixed team NH
European Games
Gold medal – first place	2023 Kraków–Małopolska	Mixed team NH
Bronze medal – third place	2023 Kraków–Małopolska	Individual NH
- Updated on 21 March 2024

Sara Marita Kramer (born 25 October 2001) is a Dutch-born Austrian former ski jumper.

== Biography ==
Kramer was born in the Netherlands, but moved from Apeldoorn to Maria Alm in Austria aged 6 when her parents started a pancake restaurant. This was documented for Dutch television program Ik Vertrek (I'm leaving).

Kramer made her debut – representing Austria – in the FIS Ski Jumping World Cup in 2017. She won three gold medals in the 2020 Nordic Junior World Ski Championships. She has also won eight individual events and three team events in the World Cup, as well as two individual third places.

Kramer qualified for the 2022 Winter Olympics and was considered one of the gold medal favorites, but tested positive for COVID-19 on 30 January, one day before the Austrian team was leaving to Beijing, and was not allowed to fly to China even though she had no symptoms. She was leading the ranking of the 2021–22 FIS Ski Jumping World Cup before the Olympics and won 7 out of 11 events. Eventually, she won the individual World Cup that year.

In 2025 she retired from competitions.

== Major tournament results ==
=== FIS World Nordic Ski Championships ===
Year	Place	NH	LH	Team NH	Mixed NH
2021	(Germany) Oberstdorf	4	4	1st place, gold medalist(s)	2nd place, silver medalist(s)
2023	(Slovenia) Planica	23	11	N/A	N/A

== World Cup ==
=== Standings ===
Season	Overall	ST	AK	L3	RA	BB
2016/17	59	N/A	N/A	N/A	N/A	N/A
2018/19	—	N/A	N/A	N/A	—	—
2019/20	9	N/A	N/A	N/A	—	N/A
2020/21	3rd place, bronze medalist(s)	N/A	N/A	N/A	N/A	1st place, gold medalist(s)
2021/22	1st place, gold medalist(s)	1st place, gold medalist(s)	2nd place, silver medalist(s)	N/A	4	N/A
2022/23	15	10	N/A	N/A	19	N/A
2023/24	15	N/A	N/A	N/A	16	N/A

=== Wins ===
No.	Season	Date	Location	Hill	Size
1	2019/20	11 January 2020	(Japan) Sapporo	Ōkurayama HS137 (night)	LH
2	2020/21	18 December 2020	(Austria) Ramsau	W90-Mattensprunganlage HS98	NH
3	2020/21	30 January 2021	(Germany) Titisee-Neustadt	Hochfirstschanze HS142	LH
4	2020/21	31 January 2021	(Germany) Titisee-Neustadt	Hochfirstschanze HS142	LH
5	2020/21	20 March 2021	(Russia) Nizhny Tagil	Tramplin Stork HS97	NH
6	2020/21	21 March 2021	(Russia) Nizhny Tagil	Tramplin Stork HS97	NH
7	2020/21	26 March 2021	(Russia) Chaykovsky	Snezhinka HS102	NH
8	2020/21	28 March 2021	(Russia) Chaykovsky	Snezhinka HS140	LH
9	2021/22	27 November 2021	(Russia) Nizhny Tagil	Tramplin Stork HS97 (night)	NH
10	2021/22	5 December 2021	(Norway) Lillehammer	Lysgårdsbakken HS140	LH
11	2021/22	10 December 2021	(Germany) Klingenthal	Vogtland Arena HS140	LH
12	2021/22	11 December 2021	(Germany) Klingenthal	Vogtland Arena HS140	LH
13	2021/22	17 December 2021	(Austria) Ramsau	W90-Mattensprunganlage HS98	NH
14	2021/22	29 January 2022	(Germany) Willingen	Mühlenkopfschanze HS147	LH'
15	2021/22	3 March 2022	(Norway) Lillehammer	Lysgårdsbakken HS140	LH
