= Thea Minyan Bjørseth =

Norwegian ski jumper and Nordic combined skier

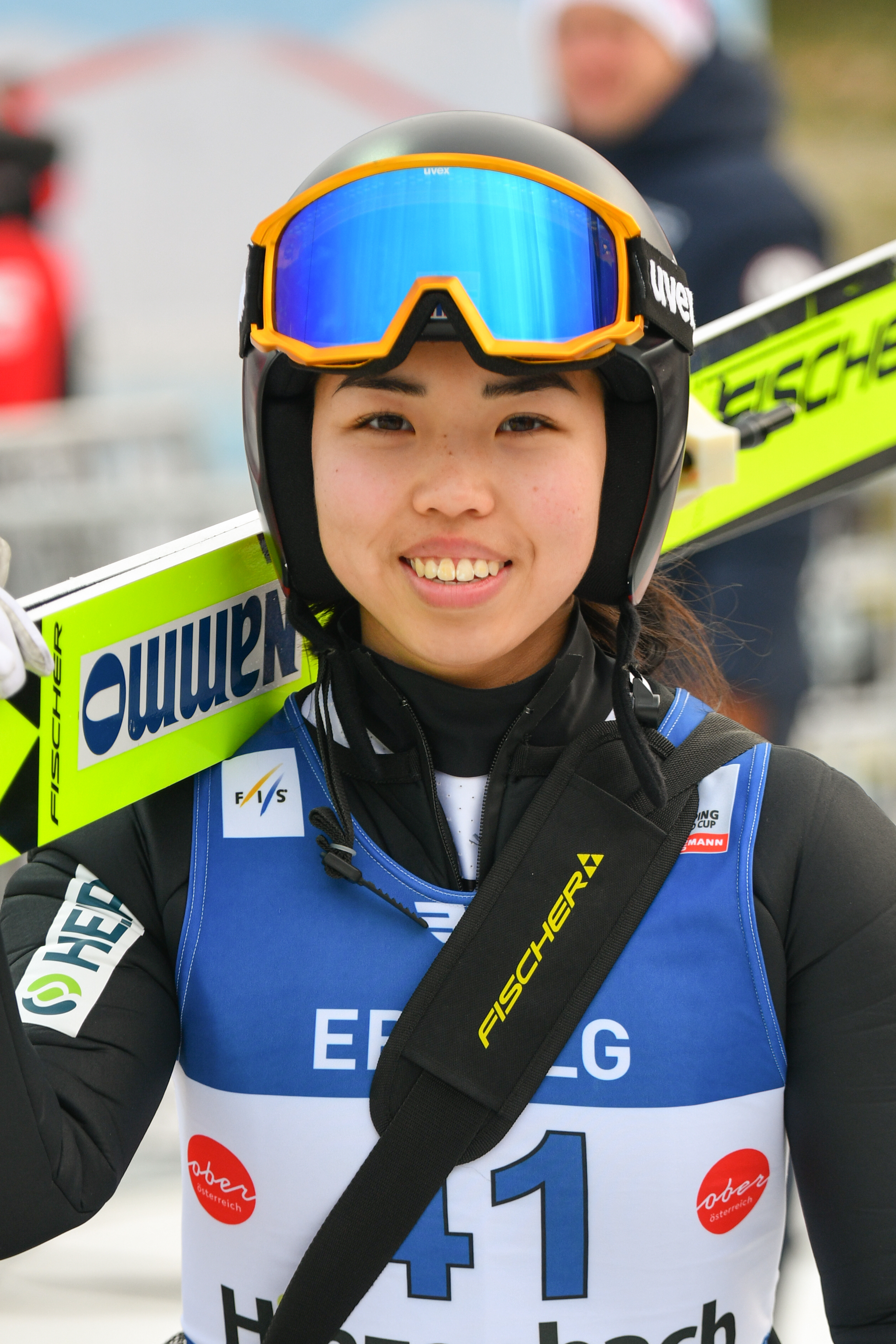
- Bjørseth in 2020

Personal information
- Nationality: Norway
- Born: 30 October 2003 (age 22)

Sport
- Sport: Skiing
- Club: Lensbygda Sportsklubb

World Cup career
- Seasons: 2020–present
- Indiv. starts: 101
- Indiv. podiums: 4
- Team starts: 10
- Team podiums: 7
- Team wins: 1

Achievements and titles
- Personal bests: 177.5 m (582 ft); Vikersund, 17 March 2024
Medal record
Women's ski jumping
Representing Norway
World Championships
Silver medal – second place	2023 Planica	Mixed team NH
Bronze medal – third place	2021 Oberstdorf	Team NH
Bronze medal – third place	2023 Planica	Team NH
Junior World Championships
Gold medal – first place	2021 Lahti	Individual NH
Silver medal – second place	2020 Oberwiesenthal	Individual NH
Silver medal – second place	2020 Oberwiesenthal	Mixed team NH
- Updated on 15 February 2025

Thea Minyan Bjørseth (born 30 October 2003) is a Norwegian ski jumper and Nordic combined skier. She participated at the team event at the FIS Nordic World Ski Championships 2021, winning the bronze medal.
