= Aigner-Schanze =

Ski jumping hill in Hinzenbach, Austria

Coordinates: 48.3244°N 13.9942°E

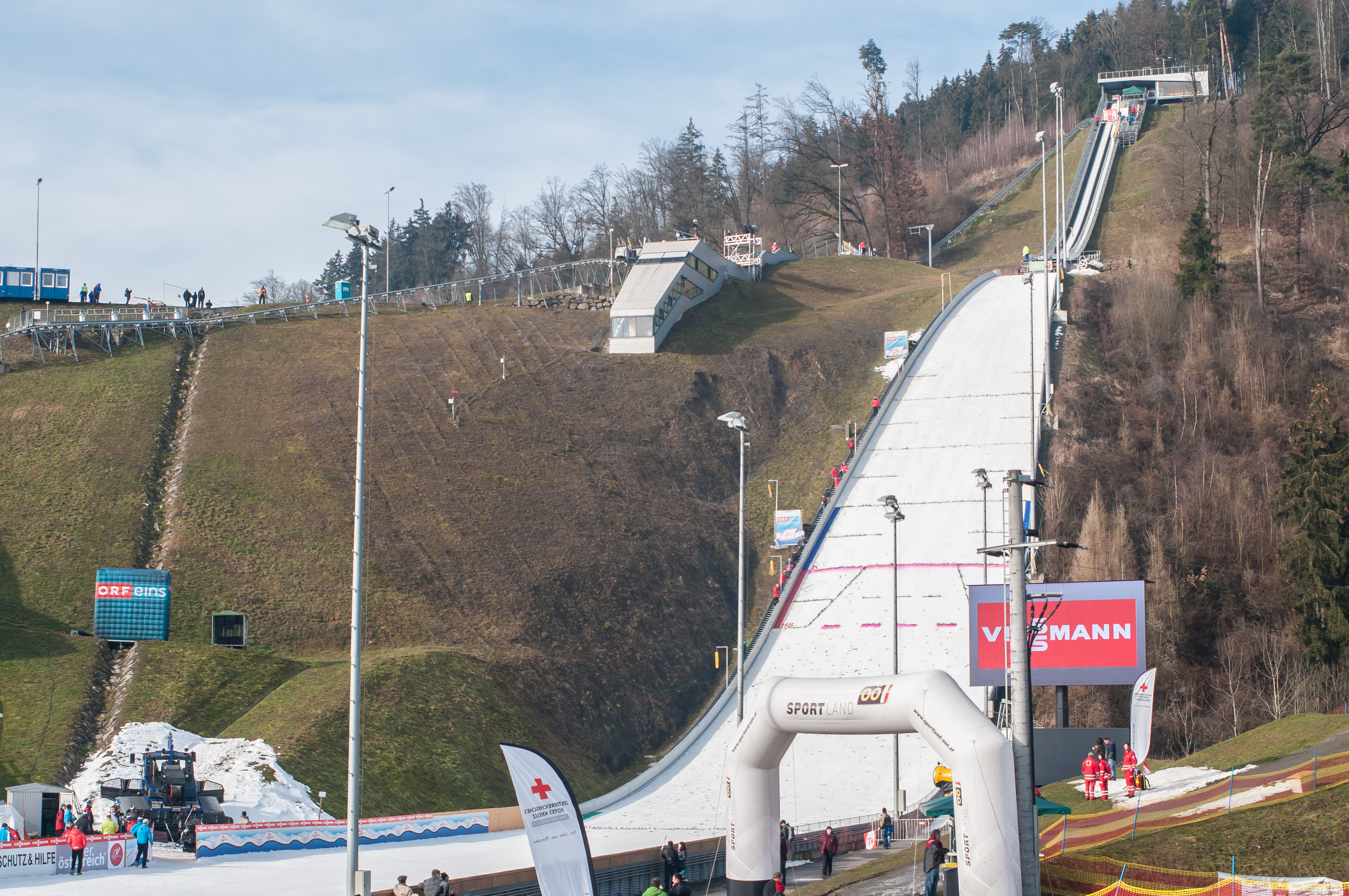
- Location: Hinzenbach, Austria
- Opened: 2010

Size
- K–point: K-85
- Hill size: HS 90
- Hill record: 100 metres (330 ft) (Austria) Markus Eggenhofer (6 February 2011)

Aigner-Schanze, officially called Energie AG-Skisprung Arena for sponsorship reasons, is a ski jumping venue located in Hinzenbach, Austria. It is due to be used in the World Cup at the end of February 2024.
