= Hinzenbach =

- Municipality
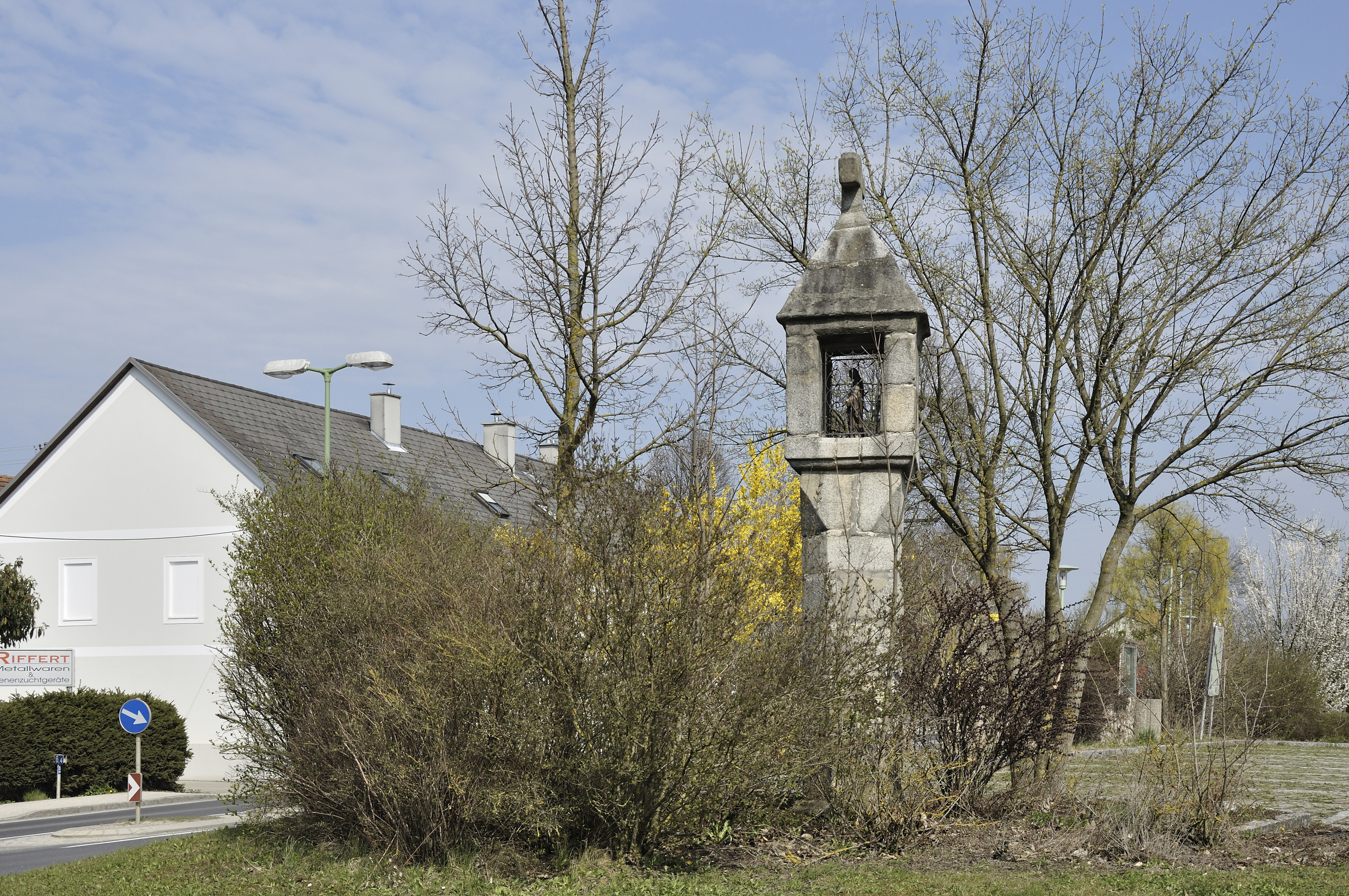
- Shrine in Hinzenbach

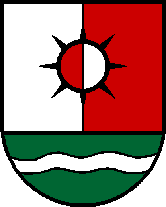
- Coat of arms

- Location within Austria
- Coordinates: 48°18′30″N 14°00′20″E
- Country: Austria
- State: Upper Austria
- District: Eferding

Government
  - Mayor: Wolfgang Kreinecker (ÖVP)

Area
  - Total: 14.6 km^{2} (5.6 sq mi)
- Elevation: 270 m (890 ft)

Population (2018-01-01)
  - Total: 1,999
  - Density: 137/km^{2} (355/sq mi)
- Time zone: UTC+1 (CET)
  - Summer (DST): UTC+2 (CEST)
- Postal code: 4070
- Area code: 07272
- Vehicle registration: EF

Hinzenbach is a municipality in the district of Eferding in the Austrian state of Upper Austria.

== Geography ==
Hinzenbach lies in the Hausruckviertel. About 10 percent of the municipality is forest and 77 percent farmland.

== Sports ==
Hinzenbach has a ski jumping hill called the Aigner-Schanze, which hosts the women's FIS Ski Jumping World Cup event every year.
