= Raw Air 2019 =

Skiing competition held in Norway

2019 Raw Air
Discipline	Men	Women
Overall	(Japan) Ryōyū Kobayashi	(Norway) Maren Lundby

Competition
Edition	3rd	1st
Locations	4	3
Individual	8	6
Team	2	—

The Raw Air 2019 is the third edition of Raw Air for men, a ten-day tournament for men in ski jumping and ski flying held across Norway between 8–17 March 2019; and the 2nd edition for women, a six-day tournament in ski jumping held across Norway between 9–14 March 2020. It is part of the 2019/20 World Cup season.

== Competition format ==
The competition is held on four different hills for men Oslo, Lillehammer, Trondheim and Vikersund; and on three hills without Vikersund for women. It lasts for ten consecutive days with a total of 16 rounds from individual events, team events and qualifications (prologues) for men; and for six consecutive days with total of 9 rounds from individual events and qualifications (prologues) for women.

=== Men ===
	Events	Rounds
Individual	4	8 (4x2)
Qualifications (prologue)	4	4 (4x1)
Team	2	3 (1x2 + 1x1)
Total	10	15

=== Women ===
	Events	Rounds
Individual	3	6 (3x2)
Qualifications (prologue)	3	3 (3x1)
Total	6	9

== Schedule ==
=== Map of hosts ===
Raw Air 2019 (Norway)

Men & Women Men only

=== Men ===
No.	Season	Date	Place	Hill	Size	Winner	Second	Third	Event	Rounds	Raw Air bib	Ref.
21	1	8 March 2019	(Norway) Oslo	Holmenkollbakken HS134 (night)	LH	(Norway) Robert Johansson	(Poland) Kamil Stoch	(Slovenia) Timi Zajc	prologue	1R	(Norway) Robert Johansson	
22	2	9 March 2019	(Norway) Oslo	Holmenkollbakken HS134	LH	(Norway) Robert Johansson	(Japan) Ryōyū Kobayashi	(Germany) Markus Eisenbichler	team	1R	(Norway) Robert Johansson	
23	3	10 March 2019	(Norway) Oslo	Holmenkollbakken HS134	LH	(Norway) Robert Johansson	(Austria) Stefan Kraft	(Slovenia) Peter Prevc	individual	2R	(Norway) Robert Johansson	
24	4	11 March 2019	(Norway) Lillehammer	Lysgårdsbakken HS140 (night)	LH	(Japan) Junshirō Kobayashi	(Japan) Ryōyū Kobayashi	(Norway) Johann André Forfang	prologue	1R	(Norway) Robert Johansson	
25	5	12 March 2019	(Norway) Lillehammer	Lysgårdsbakken HS140 (night)	LH	(Austria) Stefan Kraft	(Norway) Robert Johansson	(Japan) Ryōyū Kobayashi	individual	2R	(Norway) Robert Johansson	
26	6	13 March 2019	(Norway) Trondheim	Granåsen HS138 (night)	LH	(Austria) Stefan Kraft	(Japan) Ryōyū Kobayashi	(Poland) Dawid Kubacki	prologue	1R	(Austria) Stefan Kraft	
27	7	14 March 2019	(Norway) Trondheim	Granåsen HS138 (night)	LH	(Japan) Ryōyū Kobayashi	(Norway) Andreas Stjernen	(Austria) Stefan Kraft	individual	2R	(Austria) Stefan Kraft	
28	8	15 March 2019	(Norway) Vikersund	Vikersundbakken HS240 (night)	FH	(Japan) Ryōyū Kobayashi	(Austria) Stefan Kraft	(Germany) Markus Eisenbichler	prologue	1R	(Austria) Stefan Kraft	
29	9	16 March 2019	(Norway) Vikersund	Vikersundbakken HS240 (night)	FH	(Slovenia) Domen Prevc	(Austria) Stefan Kraft	(Japan) Ryōyū Kobayashi	team	2R	(Austria) Stefan Kraft	
30	10	17 March 2019	(Norway) Vikersund	Vikersundbakken HS240 (night)	FH	(Slovenia) Domen Prevc	(Japan) Ryōyū Kobayashi	(Austria) Stefan Kraft	individual	2R	(Japan) Ryōyū Kobayashi	
3rd Raw Air Overall						(Japan) Ryōyū Kobayashi	(Austria) Stefan Kraft	(Norway) Robert Johansson		15R		

=== Women ===
No.	Season	Date	Place	Hill	Size	Winner	Second	Third	Event	Rounds	Raw Air bib	Ref.
1	1	9 March 2019	(Norway) Oslo	Holmenkollbakken HS134 (night)	LH	(Norway) Maren Lundby	(Germany) Katharina Althaus	(Germany) Juliane Seyfarth	prologue	1R	(Norway) Maren Lundby	
2	2	10 March 2019	(Norway) Lillehammer	Lysgårdsbakken HS140	LH	(Austria) Daniela Iraschko-Stolz	(Germany) Juliane Seyfarth	(Germany) Katharina Althaus	individual	2R	(Austria) Daniela Iraschko-Stolz	
3	3	11 March 2019	(Norway) Lillehammer	Lysgårdsbakken HS140 (night)	LH	(Norway) Maren Lundby	(Germany) Katharina Althaus (Slovenia) Nika Križnar		prologue	1R	(Norway) Maren Lundby	
4	4	12 March 2019	(Norway) Lillehammer	Lysgårdsbakken HS140	LH	(Norway) Maren Lundby	(Germany) Katharina Althaus	(Austria) Eva Pinkelnig	individual	2R	(Norway) Maren Lundby	
5	5	13 March 2019	(Norway) Trondheim	Granåsen HS140 (night)	LH	(Norway) Maren Lundby	(Austria) Eva Pinkelnig	(Japan) Yūki Itō	prologue	1R	(Norway) Maren Lundby	
6	6	14 March 2019	(Norway) Trondheim	Granåsen HS140 (night)	LH	(Norway) Maren Lundby	(Germany) Juliane Seyfarth	(Austria) Eva Pinkelnig	individual	2R	(Norway) Maren Lundby	
1st Raw Air Overall						(Norway) Maren Lundby	(Germany) Katharina Althaus	(Germany) Juliane Seyfarth		9R		

=== Men's team ===
No.	Season	Date	Place	Hill	Size	Winner	Second	Third	Note	Ref.
5	1	9 March 2019	(Norway) Oslo	Holmenkollbakken HS134	LH	Norway Johann André Forfang; Robin Pedersen; Marius Lindvik; Robert Johansson	Japan Yukiya Satō; Noriaki Kasai; Junshirō Kobayashi; Ryōyū Kobayashi	Austria Michael Hayböck; Manuel Fettner; Philipp Aschenwald; Stefan Kraft	both rounds count individual in Raw Air overall	
6	2	16 March 2019	(Norway) Vikersund	Vikersundbakken HS225	FH	Slovenia Anže Semenič; Peter Prevc; Domen Prevc; Timi Zajc	Germany Constantin Schmid; Richard Freitag; Karl Geiger; Markus Eisenbichler	Austria Michael Hayböck; Philipp Aschenwald; Daniel Huber; Stefan Kraft	both rounds count individual in Raw Air overall	
