= Raw Air 2020 =

Skiing competition held in Norway

2020 Raw Air
Discipline	Men	Women
Overall	(Poland) Kamil Stoch	(Norway) Maren Lundby

Competition
Edition	4th	2nd
Locations	2	3
Individual	5	5
Team	1	—
Cancelled	4	1

The Raw Air 2020 is the fourth edition of Raw Air for men, a ten-day tournament for men in ski jumping and ski flying held across Norway between 6–15 March 2020; and the 2nd edition for women, a six-day tournament in ski jumping held across Norway between 7–12 March 2020. It is part of the 2019/20 World Cup season.

== Competition format ==
The competition is held on four different hills for men Oslo, Lillehammer, Trondheim and Vikersund; and on three hills without Vikersund for women. It lasts for ten consecutive days with a total of 16 rounds from individual events, team events and qualifications (prologues) for men; and for six consecutive days with total of 9 rounds from individual events and qualifications (prologues) for women.

=== Men ===
	Events	Rounds
Individual	2	4 (2x2)
Qualifications (prologue)	3	3 (3x1)
Team	1	2 (1x2)
Total	6	9

=== Women ===
	Events	Rounds
Individual	2	4 (2x2)
Qualifications (prologue)	3	3 (3x1)
Total	5	7

== Participants ==
=== Men ===
Nation	Total	Competitors
Norway	12	Granerud Buskum, Bjøreng, Pedersen, Håre, Lindvik, Johansson, Forfang, Tande, Villumsted, Westerheim, Egner Granerud, Myhren
Austria	7	Hayböck, Kraft, Schlierenzauer, Aigner, Aschenwald, Daniel Huber, Stefan Huber
Poland	7	Wolny, Zniszczoł, Kubacki, Stoch, Kot, Żyła, Wąsek
Germany	7	Eisenbichler, Freitag, Geiger, Leyhe, Schmid, Hamman, Freund
Japan	6	Keiichi Sato, Yukiya Sato, J. Kobayashi, R. Kobayashi, Nakamura, Ito
Slovenia	6	Peter Prevc, Semenič, Lanišek, Zajc, Domen Prevc, Jelar
Switzerland	5	Ammann, Deschwanden, Schuler, Peier Dominik Peter
Czech Republic	4	Koudelka, Kožíšek, Štursa, Filip Sakala
Russia	4	Kornilov, Klimov, Nazarov, Trofimov
Kazakhstan	2	Muminov, Tkachenko
Canada	2	Boyd-Clowes, Soukup
Finland	2	Aalto, Kytösaho
Estonia	1	Aigro
United States	1	Bickner
Bulgaria	1	Zografski
France	1	Contamine

=== Women ===
Nation	Total	Competitors
Austria	5	Siefriedsberger, Hölzl, Iraschko-Stolz, Pinkelnig, Sorschag
Slovenia	5	Križnar, Klinec, Rogelj, Brecl, Komar
Norway	4	Lundby, Opseth, Odine Strøm, Kvandal
Germany	4	Althaus, Seyfarth, Würth, Görlich
Japan	4	Takanashi, Itō, Maruyama, Setō
Russia	3	Tikhonova, Avvakumova, Kablukova
France	3	Clair, Avocat Gros, Pagnier
Italy	2	Runggaldier, Malsiner
Poland	2	Rajda, Szwab
Finland	1	Kykkänen
Hungary	1	Vörös
Sweden	1	Norstedt
South Korea	1	Park Guy-lim
Romania	1	Haralambie

== Schedule ==
=== Map of hosts ===
Raw Air 2020 (Norway)

Men & Women Men only

=== Men ===
No.	Season	Date	Place	Hill	Size	Winner	Second	Third	Event	Rounds	Raw Air bib	Ref.
31	1	6 March 2020	(Norway) Oslo	Holmenkollbakken HS134 (night)	LH	(Germany) Constantin Schmid	(Austria) Michael Hayböck	(Slovenia) Žiga Jelar	prologue	1R	(Germany) Constantin Schmid	
32	2	7 March 2020	(Norway) Oslo	Holmenkollbakken HS134 (night)	LH	(Norway) Johann André Forfang	(Poland) Kamil Stoch	(Norway) Marius Lindvik	team	2R	(Germany) Constantin Schmid	
		8 March 2020	(Norway) Oslo	Holmenkollbakken HS134	LH	strong wind and water on hill; rescheduled to Lillehammer on 9 March 2020			individual	2R		
33	3	9 March 2020	(Norway) Lillehammer	Lysgårdsbakken HS140	LH	(Slovenia) Peter Prevc	(Germany) Markus Eisenbichler	(Germany) Stephan Leyhe	individual	2R	(Norway) Marius Lindvik	
		9 March 2020	(Norway) Lillehammer	Lysgårdsbakken HS140 (night)	LH	schedule switch with Oslo individual competition; rescheduled on 10 March 2020			prologue	1R		
34	4	10 March 2020	(Norway) Lillehammer	Lysgårdsbakken HS140 (night)	LH	(Norway) Robin Pedersen	(Germany) Stephan Leyhe	(Norway) Robert Johansson	prologue	1R	(Germany) Stephan Leyhe	
35	5	10 March 2020	(Norway) Lillehammer	Lysgårdsbakken HS140	LH	(Poland) Kamil Stoch	(Slovenia) Žiga Jelar	(Slovenia) Timi Zajc	individual	2R	(Poland) Kamil Stoch	
36	6	11 March 2020	(Norway) Trondheim	Granåsen HS140 (night)	LH	(Japan) Ryōyū Kobayashi	(Poland) Piotr Żyła	(Norway) Johann André Forfang	prologue	1R	(Poland) Kamil Stoch	
		12 March 2020	(Norway) Trondheim	Granåsen HS140 (night)	LH	cancelled due to the coronavirus pandemic			individual	2R		
		13 March 2020	(Norway) Vikersund	Vikersundbakken HS240 (night)	FH	cancelled due to the coronavirus pandemic			prologue	1R		
		14 March 2020	(Norway) Vikersund	Vikersundbakken HS240	FH	cancelled due to the coronavirus pandemic			team	2R		
		15 March 2020	(Norway) Vikersund	Vikersundbakken HS240	FH	cancelled due to the coronavirus pandemic			individual	2R		
4th Raw Air Overall						(Poland) Kamil Stoch	(Japan) Ryōyū Kobayashi	(Norway) Marius Lindvik		9R		

=== Women ===
No.	Season	Date	Place	Hill	Size	Winner	Second	Third	Event	Rounds	Raw Air bib	Ref.
7	1	7 March 2020	(Norway) Oslo	Holmenkollbakken HS134 (night)	LH	(Norway) Maren Lundby	(Austria) Jacqueline Seifriedsberger	(Austria) Chiara Hölzl	prologue	1R	(Norway) Maren Lundby	
		8 March 2020	(Norway) Oslo	Holmenkollbakken HS134	LH	strong wind and water on hill; rescheduled to Lillehammer on 9 March 2020			individual	2R		
8	2	9 March 2020	(Norway) Lillehammer	Lysgårdsbakken HS140	LH	(Japan) Sara Takanashi	(Norway) Maren Lundby	(Norway) Silje Opseth	individual	2R	(Norway) Maren Lundby	
		9 March 2020	(Norway) Lillehammer	Lysgårdsbakken HS140 (night)	LH	schedule switch with Oslo individual competition; rescheduled on 10 March 2020			prologue	1R		
9	3	10 March 2020	(Norway) Lillehammer	Lysgårdsbakken HS140 (night)	LH	(Norway) Maren Lundby	(Austria) Jacqueline Seifriedsberger	(Norway) Silje Opseth	prologue	1R	(Norway) Maren Lundby	
10	4	10 March 2020	(Norway) Lillehammer	Lysgårdsbakken HS140	LH	(Norway) Maren Lundby	(Norway) Silje Opseth	(Austria) Chiara Hölzl	individual	2R	(Norway) Maren Lundby	
11	5	11 March 2020	(Norway) Trondheim	Granåsen HS140 (night)	LH	(Norway) Maren Lundby	(Norway) Silje Opseth	(Slovenia) Nika Križnar	prologue	1R	(Norway) Maren Lundby	
		12 March 2020	(Norway) Trondheim	Granåsen HS140 (night)	LH	cancelled due to the coronavirus pandemic			individual	2R		
2nd Raw Air Overall						(Norway) Maren Lundby	(Norway) Silje Opseth	(Austria) Eva Pinkelnig		7R		

=== Men's team ===
No.	Season	Date	Place	Hill	Size	Winner	Second	Third	Note	Ref.
7	1	7 March 2020	(Norway) Oslo	Holmenkollbakken HS134	LH	Norway Johann André Forfang; Robert Johansson; Daniel-André Tande; Marius Lindvik	Germany Constantin Schmid; Pius Paschke; Stephan Leyhe; Karl Geiger	Slovenia Žiga Jelar; Timi Zajc; Anže Lanišek; Peter Prevc	both rounds count individual in Raw Air overall	
		14 March 2020	(Norway) Vikersund	Vikersundbakken HS225	FH	cancelled due to the coronavirus pandemic			both rounds count individual in Raw Air overall	

== Standings ==
=== Men's Raw Air ===
Rank	After 6 of 10 events	06/03/2020 Oslo		07/03/2020 Oslo			09/03/2020 Lillehammer			10/03/2020 Lillehammer		10/03/2020 Lillehammer			11/03/2020 Trondheim		Total points (9/16)
Rank	After 6 of 10 events	Prologue (Q)		Team (2R)			Individual (2R)			Prologue (Q)		Individual (2R)			Prologue (Q)		Total points (9/16)
Rank	After 6 of 10 events	Rank	Points (R1)	Rank	Points (R2)	Points (R3)	Rank	Points (R4)	Points (R5)	Rank	Points (R6)	Rank	Points (R7)	Points (R8)	Rank	Points (R9)	Total points (9/16)
1st place, gold medalist(s)	(Poland) Kamil Stoch	27	117.2	2	122.2	132.5	7	145.5	127.2	13	119.9	1	128.6	135.7	10	133.1	1161.9
2nd place, silver medalist(s)	(Japan) Ryōyū Kobayashi	20	121.5	5	122.7	129.2	9	142.0	128.4	22	110.9	4	126.1	127.5	1	146.2	1154.5
3rd place, bronze medalist(s)	(Norway) Marius Lindvik	7	125.2	3	120.5	133.8	4	136.9	138.8	14	119.8	12	110.9	126.5	4	141.9	1154.3
4	(Slovenia) Žiga Jelar	3	127.2	6	124.5	127.2	20	115.3	138.3	4	127.6	2	120.9	138.1	11	132.8	1151.9
5	(Germany) Stephan Leyhe	12	123.6	10	119.0	125.2	3	134.9	142.6	2	136.6	9	121.3	124.9	30	120.9	1149.0
6	(Norway) Robert Johansson	4	126.6	12	112.3	128.2	5	139.0	136.5	3	131.2	13	120.5	116.4	14	129.9	1140.6
7	(Slovenia) Peter Prevc	25	118.5	16	103.1	130.6	1	139.0	140.0	18	114.3	5	121.7	128.9	7	137.7	1133.8
8	(Austria) Stefan Kraft	6	125.9	7	115.9	135.2	8	128.6	142.0	16	118.7	17	107.4	123.2	8	134.9	1131.8
9	(Slovenia) Timi Zajc	24	119.1	17	111.0	120.1	22	120.4	131.1	5	127.3	3	137.3	120.3	23	123.2	1109.8
10	(Japan) Yukiya Satō	17	121.6	14	109.2	129.2	12	127.6	135.3	9	123.5	14	106.9	128.3	36	117.0	1098.6
11	(Austria) Gregor Schlierenzauer	7	125.2	20	111.9	115.5	10	128.1	135.4	11	120.1	18	110.5	118.9	12	131.4	1097.0
12	(Germany) Karl Geiger	13	123.2	13	117.4	122.7	19	130.9	123.4	11	120.1	19	108.8	119.6	13	130.5	1096.6
13	(Russia) Evgeniy Klimov	16	121.8	21	105.7	121.2	24	120.8	128.5	20	112.9	7	128.5	119.6	16	127.7	1086.7
14	(Germany) Constantin Schmid	1	127.7	4	124.9	127.8	16	127.1	129.4	40	94.1	11	113.8	124.0	37	116.9	1085.7
15	(Germany) Pius Paschke	22	120.6	22	110.1	113.8	14	127.6	130.5	15	119.5	15	114.5	120.4	29	121.0	1078.0
16	(Poland) Dawid Kubacki	42	106.0	9	112.8	131.7	25	115.1	133.4	35	97.1	8	134.0	113.7	9	133.6	1077.4
17	(Poland) Piotr Żyła	5	126.0	11	124.2	118.7	23	121.3	130.0	30	102.0	26	119.4	87.8	2	143.1	1072.5
18	(Norway) Daniel-André Tande	17	121.6	8	123.2	124.5	13	128.9	129.4	39	95.5	25	110.4	102.3	21	124.4	1060.2
19	(Austria) Michael Hayböck	2	127.5	24	98.2	117.2	29	133.1	110.5	23	107.3	16	105.8	126.0	20	124.5	1050.1
20	(Japan) Junshirō Kobayashi	34	112.7	19	107.2	121.0	27	116.3	129.7	33	99.8	24	111.0	110.6	15	129.3	1037.6
21	(Slovenia) Anže Lanišek	23	119.7	15	109.0	128.7	11	126.4	136.9	6	126.6	23	107.5	115.8	DSQ	—	970.6
22	(Switzerland) Killian Peier	48	104.8	25	97.4	115.7	30	124.3	114.1	47	86.5	29	103.5	82.0	25	123.4	951.7
23	(Norway) Johann André Forfang	21	121.2	1	123.7	131.2	21	118.9	134.6	7	124.5	48	52.9	DNQ	3	142.9	949.9
24	(Austria) Daniel Huber	9	125.0	23	108.1	114.1	18	123.6	132.5	27	104.4	31	102.4	DNQ	31	120.7	930.8
25	(Japan) Keiichi Satō	11	123.8	18	114.6	113.9	35	99.2	DNQ	25	106.9	21	115.5	110.6	43	113.0	897.5
26	(Norway) Robin Pedersen	29	115.7	DNS	—	—	5	131.6	143.9	1	137.1	10	114.6	129.2	28	121.7	893.8
27	(Austria) Philipp Aschenwald	17	121.6	DNS	—	—	15	119.8	137.0	19	114.1	6	118.9	130.4	6	137.9	879.7
28	(Poland) Maciej Kot	14	122.3	26	97.6	110.3	39	94.2	DNQ	17	118.3	28	106.2	89.4	3	119.1	857.4
29	(Finland) Antti Aalto	15	122.1	DNS	—	—	26	110.6	137.0	21	111.8	22	126.1	99.6	17	127.4	834.6
30	(Japan) Daiki Ito	38	108.6	DNS	—	—	16	123.4	133.1	49	83.3	30	102.8	76.0	14	123.8	751.0
31	(Germany) Markus Eisenbichler	31	114.9	DNS	—	—	2	149.4	129.2	10	122.6	44	78.7	DNQ	5	139.2	734.0
32	(Switzerland) Simon Ammann	36	109.2	29	92.2	100.2	42	90.1	DNQ	29	102.3	32	101.2	DNQ	39	116.7	711.9
33	(Russia) Roman Trofimov	45	105.2	28	91.9	103.1	46	86.1	DNQ	44	92.8	43	80.1	DNQ	52	105.0	664.2
34	(Switzerland) Andreas Schuler	45	105.2	27	97.1	107.6	44	86.7	DNQ	54	76.9	DNQ	—	—	47	108.4	581.9
35	(Czech Republic) Roman Koudelka	30	115.0	33	103.6	DNQ	36	96.8	DNQ	38	95.9	49	40.5	DNQ	42	114.1	565.9
36	(Norway) Anders Håre	10	124.0	DNS	—	—	28	110.2	134.0	57	73.9	DNQ	—	—	32	119.9	562.0
37	(Slovenia) Anže Semenič	54	100.1	DNS	—	—	DNQ	—	—	24	107.1	20	104.9	122.0	18	126.0	560.1
38	(Slovenia) Domen Prevc	28	116.6	DNS	—	—	50	77.8	DNQ	8	123.6	37	92.7	DNQ	34	119.0	529.7
39	(Poland) Jakub Wolny	43	105.5	DNS	—	—	37	95.9	DNQ	32	100.4	34	100.6	DNQ	40	116.3	518.7
40	(Austria) Clemens Aigner	40	104.7	DNS	—	—	34	100.1	DNQ	46	89.5	36	95.6	DNQ	23	123.9	513.8
41	(United States) Kevin Bickner	40	107.1	DNS	—	—	33	102.1	DNQ	34	99.2	41	85.6	DNQ	41	116.1	510.1
42	(Germany) Severin Freund	35	111.5	DNS	—	—	43	89.3	DNQ	43	93.1	38	90.6	DNQ	44	111.9	496.4
43	(Bulgaria) Vladimir Zografski	39	108.4	DNS	—	—	31	107.4	DNQ	37	96.1	46	67.1	DNQ	37	116.9	495.9
44	(Japan) Naoki Nakamura	32	114.6	DNS	—	—	44	86.7	DNQ	42	93.8	39	90.2	DNQ	45	110.0	495.3
45	(Kazakhstan) Sergey Tkachenko	60	86.9	DNS	—	—	DNQ	—	—	36	96.7	27	111.0	84.8	46	109.0	488.4
46	(Austria) Stefan Huber	44	105.4	DNS	—	—	47	85.6	DNQ	48	83.8	47	60.0	DNQ	48	108.3	443.1
47	(Czech Republic) Čestmír Kožíšek	61	85.7	34	80.3	DNQ	DNQ	—	—	45	89.7	42	81.1	DNQ	55	100.3	437.1
48	(Finland) Niko Kytösaho	53	100.6	DNS	—	—	DNQ	—	—	28	103.9	32	101.2	DNQ	22	124.0	429.7
49	(Canada) Mackenzie Boyd-Clowes	26	117.5	DNS	—	—	32	107.2	DNQ	51	82.1	DNQ	—	—	27	122.6	429.4
49	(Russia) Mikhail Nazarov	59	88.4	32	73.1	88.1	DNQ	—	—	58	72.5	DNQ	—	—	49	107.3	429.4
51	(Russia) Denis Kornilov	58	90.8	31	76.8	93.6	DNQ	—	—	62	70.8	DNQ	—	—	56	93.3	425.3
52	(Norway) Andreas Granerud Buskum	50	103.3	DNS	—	—	38	94.7	DNQ	26	104.7	40	90.0	DNQ	DNS	—	392.7
53	(Estonia) Artti Aigro	57	93.5	DNS	—	—	DNQ	—	—	41	94.0	35	99.8	DNQ	53	103.3	390.6
54	(Switzerland) Gregor Deschwanden	37	109.0	30	84.0	95.4	40	93.6	DNQ	DNS	—	DNS	—	—	DNS	—	382.0
55	(Germany) Martin Hamann	33	114.0	DNS	—	—	48	84.5	DNQ	61	71.9	DNQ	—	—	50	106.4	376.8
56	(Kazakhstan) Sabirzhan Muminov	52	101.2	DNS	—	—	DNQ	—	—	50	83.0	44	78.7	DNQ	54	103.0	365.9
57	(Czech Republic) Vojtěch Štursa	63	79.7	35	79.8	DNQ	DNQ	—	—	59	72.4	DNQ	—	—	57	91.2	323.1
58	(Norway) Oscar P. Westerheim	45	105.2	DNS	—	—	41	91.6	DNQ	53	77.6	DNQ	—	—	DNS	—	274.4
59	(Poland) Aleksander Zniszczoł	51	101.3	DNS	—	—	DNQ	—	—	66	41.8	DNQ	—	—	19	125.2	268.3
60	(Norway) Joacim Ødegård Bjøreng	41	106.4	DNS	—	—	49	82.2	DNQ	56	75.1	DNQ	—	—	DNS	—	263.7
61	(Poland) Pawel Wąsek	DNS	—	DNS	—	—	DNS	—	—	31	101.3	50	23.3	DNQ	35	117.6	242.2
62	(Canada) Matthew Soukup	62	79.9	DNS	—	—	DNQ	—	—	65	53.9	DNQ	—	—	59	66.2	200.0
63	(Switzerland) Dominik Peter	DNS	—	DNS	—	—	DNS	—	—	52	78.2	DNQ	—	—	51	105.3	183.5
64	(Norway) Halvor Egner Granerud	55	97.3	DNS	—	—	DNQ	—	—	55	75.5	DNQ	—	—	DNS	—	172.8
65	(Norway) Mats Bjerke Myhren	56	95.2	DNS	—	—	DNQ	—	—	59	72.4	DNQ	—	—	DNS	—	167.6
66	(Czech Republic) Filip Sakala	DSQ	—	36	70.1	DNQ	DNQ	—	—	63	67.1	DNQ	—	—	DSQ	—	137.2
67	(Norway) Fredrik Villumstad	64	70.0	DNS	—	—	DNQ	—	—	64	60.3	DNQ	—	—	DNS	—	130.3
68	(France) Mathias Contamine	DNS	—	DNS	—	—	DNS	—	—	DNS	—	DNS	—	—	58	85.6	85.6

=== Women's Raw Air ===
Rank	After 5 of events	07/03/2020 Oslo		09/03/2020 Lillehammer			10/03/2020 Lillehammer		10/03/2020 Lillehammer			11/03/2020 Trondheim		Total points (7/9)
Rank	After 5 of events	Prologue (Q)		Individual (2R)			Prologue (Q)		Individual (2R)			Prologue (Q)		Total points (7/9)
Rank	After 5 of events	Rank	Points (R1)	Rank	Points (R2)	Points (R3)	Rank	Points (R4)	Rank	Points (R5)	Points (R6)	Rank	Points (R7)	Total points (7/9)
1st place, gold medalist(s)	(Norway) Maren Lundby	1	133.3	2	147.9	147.5	1	133.2	1	145.2	117.1	1	120.3	944.5
2nd place, silver medalist(s)	(Norway) Silje Opseth	6	112.0	3	149.4	144.1	3	113.1	2	131.6	130.0	2	119.9	900.1
3rd place, bronze medalist(s)	(Austria) Eva Pinkelnig	10	105.4	6	148.5	137.6	9	89.1	4	129.4	116.3	7	104.1	830.4
4	(Germany) Katharina Althaus	4	115.3	4	147.0	143.8	5	94.9	6	118.5	106.7	9	104.0	830.2
5	(Austria) Chiara Hölzl	3	117.2	9	123.8	137.4	10	87.7	3	139.2	115.9	6	106.6	827.8
6	(Japan) Sara Takanashi	5	114.0	1	150.1	146.8	7	92.1	8	104.4	101.3	5	107.5	816.2
7	(Slovenia) Ema Klinec	14	90.2	7	138.1	134.5	17	60.0	5	124.7	112.6	4	116.2	776.3
8	(Slovenia) Nika Križnar	7	109.6	5	147.8	142.6	28	40.1	9	88.3	109.0	3	118.3	755.7
9	(Austria) Daniela Iraschko-Stolz	12	93.5	8	130.6	131.5	16	61.8	10	91.2	80.8	10	100.4	689.8
10	(Germany) Juliane Seyfarth	9	106.1	12	119.1	115.9	8	91.4	16	86.8	69.4	11	98.4	687.1
11	(Norway) Anna Odine Strøm	16	86.8	13	114.0	119.4	6	94.4	12	87.5	84.2	14	85.6	671.9
12	(Japan) Nozomi Maruyama	15	87.6	14	118.6	107.8	12	72.2	13	81.2	90.1	12	92.4	649.9
13	(Japan) Yūki Itō	8	108.0	33	77.3	DNQ	4	100.4	7	100.7	113.2	7	104.1	603.7
14	(Austria) Jacqueline Seifriedsberger	2	121.2	11	108.0	130.6	2	113.4	28	105.8	DNS	DNS	—	579.0
15	(Japan) Yūka Setō	17	81.7	18	107.3	113.2	20	57.3	18	80.9	67.6	30	58.4	566.4
16	(Germany) Luisa Görlich	24	64.4	16	107.0	116.8	22	56.5	21	78.7	66.4	24	74.3	564.1
17	(Italy) Lara Malsiner	DNS	—	10	122.0	126.8	14	68.5	15	86.8	71.0	13	85.9	561.0
18	(Italy) Elena Runggaldier	19	76.2	24	101.9	104.9	23	54.1	17	89.0	61.3	25	72.1	559.5
19	(France) Julia Clair	18	78.7	28	104.8	88.2	27	43.6	14	92.7	68.6	16	80.0	556.6
20	(Austria) Sophie Sorschag	27	54.3	23	94.9	115.8	15	65.8	22	67.0	77.7	19	78.0	553.5
21	(Russia) Sofia Tikhonova	11	97.1	25	98.9	106.8	29	38.2	23	68.8	66.2	22	76.4	552.4
22	(Germany) Svenja Würth	21	69.3	21	117.0	96.6	31	36.5	19	84.7	63.4	23	74.7	542.2
23	(Romania) Daniela Haralambie	23	64.8	19	109.2	109.4	18	59.7	25	66.1	54.9	21	77.0	541.1
24	(Slovenia) Špela Rogelj	DSQ	—	22	118.3	93.3	12	72.2	11	78.3	93.6	20	77.1	532.8
25	(France) Joséphine Pagnier	DNS	—	15	114.8	111.5	11	83.0	20	76.5	69.7	31	55.5	511.0
26	(Slovenia) Katra Komar	DNS	—	20	106.3	109.8	25	50.8	24	73.7	47.5	17	79.8	467.9
27	(France) Océane Avocat Gros	25	59.2	26	106.3	93.2	19	57.5	27	61.9	44.1	34	41.4	463.6
28	(Russia) Irina Avvakumova	13	90.3	16	111.0	112.8	21	57.0	DSQ	—	—	15	83.6	454.7
29	(Sweden) Astrid Norstedt	20	76.0	29	83.9	106.7	33	18.3	30	53.3	27.8	33	53.5	419.5
30	(Finland) Julia Kykkänen	22	66.3	27	92.0	104.1	25	50.8	32	5.2	DNQ	32	54.1	372.5
31	(Russia) Ksenia Kablukova	28	48.1	31	83.5	DNQ	24	52.3	26	60.3	49.1	29	60.9	354.2
32	(South Korea) Park Guy-lim	29	35.3	30	91.6	94.3	32	29.5	31	11.7	DNQ	35	27.1	289.5
33	(Slovenia) Jerneja Brecl	DNS	—	32	81.7	DNQ	30	37.6	29	58.2	32.2	28	61.0	270.7
34	(Norway) Eirin Maria Kvandal	DNS	—	DNS	—	—	DNS	—	DNS	—	—	18	79.3	79.3
35	(Poland) Kinga Rajda	DNS	—	DNS	—	—	DNS	—	DNS	—	—	26	71.4	71.4
36	(Poland) Joanna Szwab	DNS	—	DNS	—	—	DNS	—	DNS	—	—	27	63.9	63.9
37	(Hungary) Virág Vörös	26	57.6	DNS	—	—	DNS	—	DNS	—	—	DNS	—	57.6

competitor scored points in all rounds of the Tournament
