= 2023–24 FIS Ski Jumping World Cup =

Ski jumping competition

Discipline	Men	Women
Overall	(Austria) Stefan Kraft (3rd title)	(Slovenia) Nika Prevc (1st title)
Nations Cup	Austria (21st)	Austria (6th)
Ski flying	(Austria) Daniel Huber (1st)	—

Stage events
Four Hills Tournament	(Japan) Ryōyū Kobayashi (3rd)	—
Two Nights Tournament	—	(Slovenia) Nika Prevc (1st)
Polish Tour	Austria (1st)	—
Raw Air	(Austria) Stefan Kraft (3rd)	(Norway) Eirin Maria Kvandal (1st)
Planica7	(Austria) Daniel Huber (1st)	

Competition
Edition	45th	13th
Locations	19	15
Individual	32	24
Team	5	1
Cancelled	–	3
Rescheduled	2	1

The 2023–24 FIS Ski Jumping World Cup was the 45th World Cup season in ski jumping for men, the 27th season in ski flying for men, and the 13th season in ski jumping for women. It was organized by the International Ski Federation (FIS).

The men's season started on 25 November 2023 in Ruka, Finland and concluded on 24 March 2024 in Planica, Slovenia. The women's season started on 2 December 2023 in Lillehammer, Norway and concluded on 21 March 2024, also in Planica.

Halvor Egner Granerud (men's) and Eva Pinkelnig (women's) were the reigning champions from the previous season, but they did not defend the title. Granerud finished the season in 24th place and Pinkelnig in 2nd place. Stefan Kraft (men's) and Nika Prevc (women's) became the new overall champions. Both Nations Cups were won by Austria.

There were a record 32 individual men's events and 24 individual women's events, in addition to 7 team events (3 men's team, 3 men's super team and 1 women's super team).

For the first time since the 2019–20 season, there were no mixed team competitions on the World Cup calendar.

== Season overview ==
Overall champions

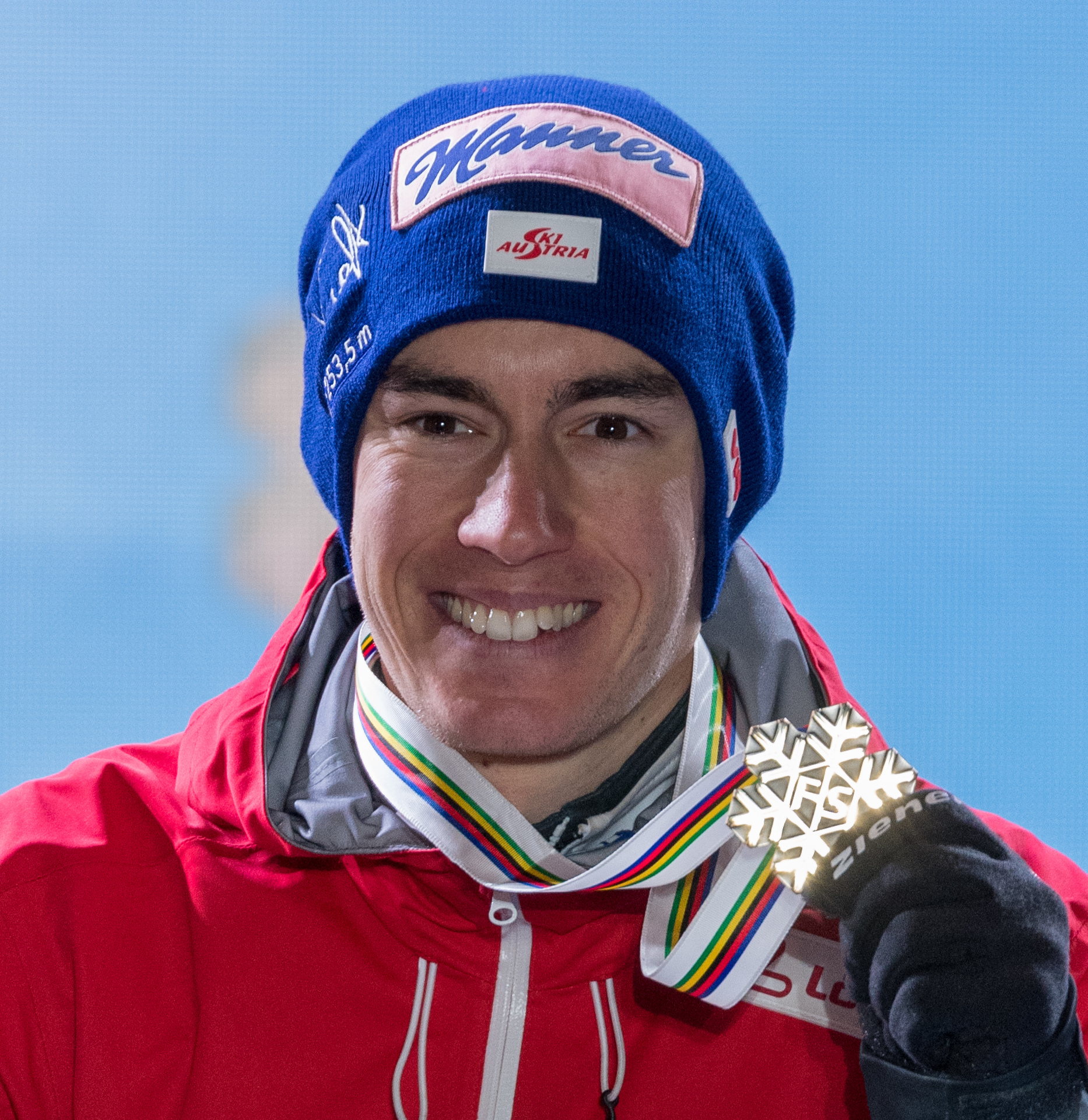
Stefan Kraft won 13 times during the season and clinched his third overall title.

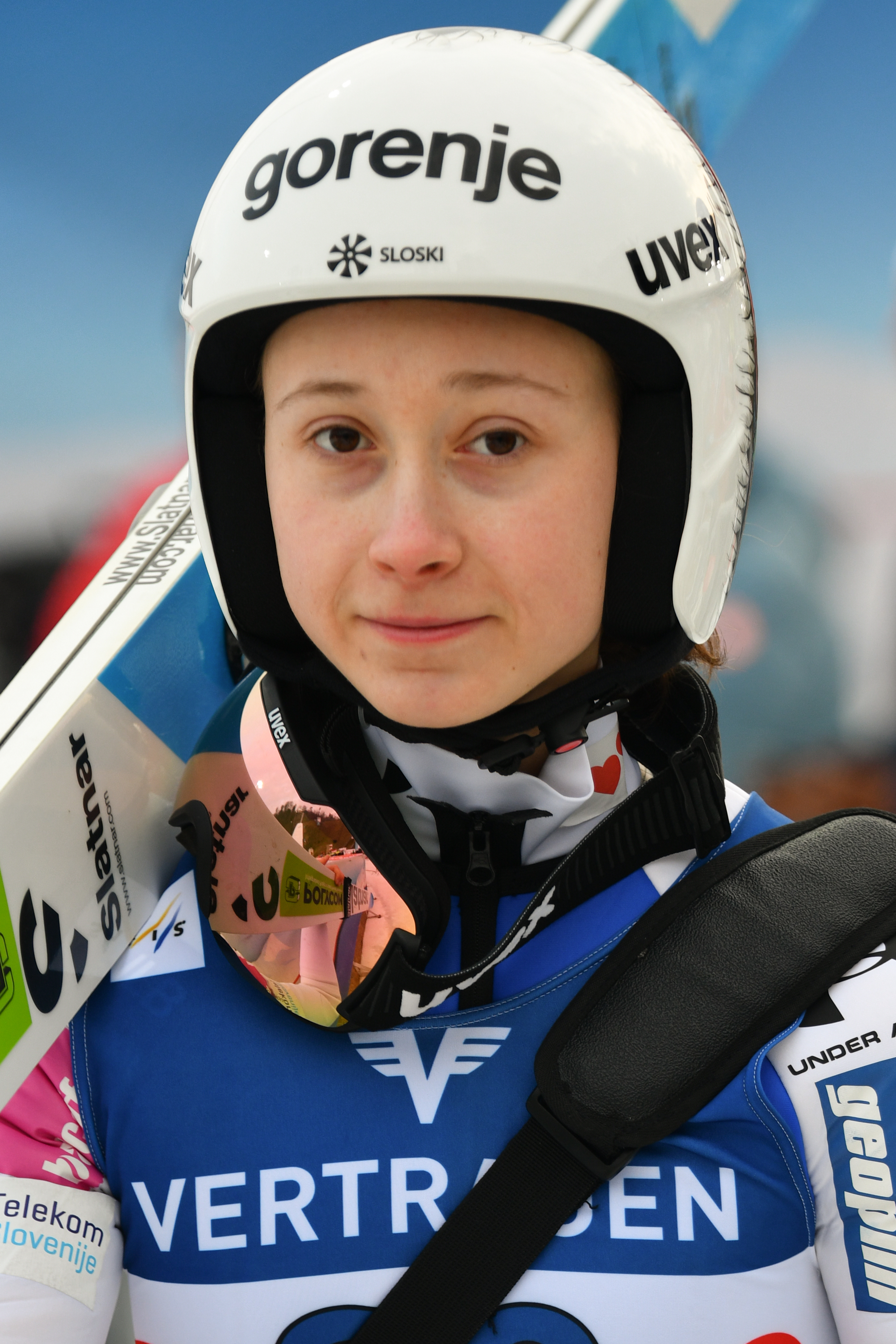
Nika Prevc won her first overall title, with 7 individual wins.

The Polish Tour made its debut and took place in Wisła and Zakopane. Ski flying competitions were first introduced as part of the Women's World Cup and took place in Vikersund, where a total of two new women's world record distances were set (one of them not recognized due to crash).

Noriaki Kasai became the first ski jumper in history over the age of 50 to qualify for a World Cup competition and reach the final round, breaking the record for the oldest ski jumper to compete in a top-level competition. He achieved this 34 years after scoring his first points (9 December 1989), and managed to score a point in his 570th appearance.

Austrian ski jumper Stefan Kraft won 13 individual events and scored 2,149 points, winning his third overall title and third Raw Air Tournament. Daniel Huber won ski flying title and Planica7, while Ryōyū Kobayashi took his third Four Hills Tournament trophy. Slovenian rising star Nika Prevc took her first women's overall title with seven individual wins in the season, and Eirin Maria Kvandal won her first Raw Air Tournament.

== World records ==
List of world record distances achieved within this World Cup season.

Date	Athlete	Hill	Round	Place	Metres	Feet
Women
17 March 2024	(Norway) Silje Opseth	Vikersundbakken HS240	Trial	Vikersund, Norway	236.5	776
17 March 2024	(Norway) Silje Opseth	Vikersundbakken HS240	Final	Vikersund, Norway	230.5	756

Longest women's jump in history, but invalid due to Opseth's crash upon landing.

== Map of World Cup hosts ==
For the first time in the World Cup's history, a competition was planned on Skalite in Szczyrk, Poland. The city would be the 59th town to host the World Cup, but it was not among the cities where the competition itself took place due to its cancellation due to strong wind. However, they still managed to complete the qualifying series round in Szczyrk, which counted for PolSKI Tour overall classification.

(Finland) Ruka	(Norway) Lillehammer	(Germany) Klingenthal	(Switzerland) Engelberg	(Germany) Oberstdorf	(Germany) Garmisch-Pa
Rukatunturi	Lysgårdsbakken	Vogtland Arena	Gross-Titlis	Schattenberg	Große Olympiaschanze
(Austria) Innsbruck	(Austria) Bischofshofen	(Poland) Wisła	(Poland) Szczyrk	(Poland) Zakopane	(Germany) Willingen
Bergiselschanze	Paul-Ausserleitner	Malinka	Skalite	Wielka Krokiew	Mühlenkopfschanze
(United States) Lake Placid	(Japan) Sapporo	(Germany) Oberstdorf	(Finland) Lahti	(Norway) Oslo	(Norway) Trondheim
MacKenzie Intervale	Ōkurayama	Heini-Klopfer	Salpausselkä	Holmenkollbakken	Granåsen
(Norway) Vikersund	(Slovenia) Planica	(Austria) Villach	(Japan) Zaō	(Slovenia) Ljubno ob Savinji	(Austria) Hinzenbach
Vikersundbakken	Letalnica bratov Gorišek	Villacher Alpenarena	Yamagata	Savina	Aigner-Schanze
Europe
Germany		Austria United States		Asia	

== Men's individual ==
=== Calendar ===
Event key: N – normal hill / L – large hill / F – flying hill
All	No.	Date	Place (Hill)	Size	Winner	Second	Third	Overall Leader	R.
1088	1	25 November 2023	(Finland) Ruka (Rukatunturi HS142)	L _{788}	(Austria) Stefan Kraft	(Germany) Pius Paschke	(Germany) Stephan Leyhe	(Austria) Stefan Kraft	
1089	2	26 November 2023	(Finland) Ruka (Rukatunturi HS142)	L _{789}	(Austria) Stefan Kraft	(Austria) Jan Hörl	(Germany) Andreas Wellinger	(Austria) Stefan Kraft	
1090	3	2 December 2023	(Norway) Lillehammer (Lysgårdsbakken HS98/140)	N _{161}	(Austria) Stefan Kraft	(Germany) Andreas Wellinger	(Austria) Daniel Tschofenig	(Austria) Stefan Kraft	
1091	4	3 December 2023	(Norway) Lillehammer (Lysgårdsbakken HS98/140)	L _{790}	(Austria) Stefan Kraft	(Germany) Andreas Wellinger	(Austria) Jan Hörl	(Austria) Stefan Kraft	
1092	5	9 December 2023	(Germany) Klingenthal (Vogtland Arena HS140)	L _{791}	(Germany) Karl Geiger	(Austria) Stefan Kraft	(Japan) Ryōyū Kobayashi	(Austria) Stefan Kraft	
1093	6	10 December 2023	(Germany) Klingenthal (Vogtland Arena HS140)	L _{792}	(Germany) Karl Geiger	(Switzerland) Gregor Deschwanden	(Germany) Andreas Wellinger	(Austria) Stefan Kraft	
1094	7	16 December 2023	(Switzerland) Engelberg (Gross-Titlis HS140)	L _{793}	(Germany) Pius Paschke	(Norway) Marius Lindvik	(Austria) Stefan Kraft	(Austria) Stefan Kraft	
1095	8	17 December 2023	(Switzerland) Engelberg (Gross-Titlis HS140)	L _{794}	(Austria) Stefan Kraft	(Austria) Jan Hörl	(Germany) Pius Paschke	(Austria) Stefan Kraft	
1096	9	29 December 2023	(Germany) Oberstdorf (Schattenberg HS137)	L _{795}	(Germany) Andreas Wellinger	(Japan) Ryōyū Kobayashi	(Austria) Stefan Kraft	(Austria) Stefan Kraft	
1097	10	1 January 2024	(Germany) Garmisch-Pa (Olympiaschanze HS142)	L _{796}	(Slovenia) Anže Lanišek	(Japan) Ryōyū Kobayashi	(Germany) Andreas Wellinger	(Austria) Stefan Kraft	
1098	11	3 January 2024	(Austria) Innsbruck (Bergiselschanze HS128)	L _{797}	(Austria) Jan Hörl	(Japan) Ryōyū Kobayashi	(Austria) Michael Hayböck	(Austria) Stefan Kraft	
1099	12	6 January 2024	(Austria) Bischofshofen (Paul-Ausserleitner HS142)	L _{798}	(Austria) Stefan Kraft	(Japan) Ryōyū Kobayashi	(Slovenia) Anže Lanišek	(Austria) Stefan Kraft	
72nd Four Hills Tournament Overall (29 December 2023 – 6 January 2024)					(Japan) Ryōyū Kobayashi	(Germany) Andreas Wellinger	(Austria) Stefan Kraft	4H Tournament	
qualifying		12 January 2024	(Poland) Wisła (Malinka HS134)	L _{Qro}	(Slovenia) Anže Lanišek	(Germany) Andreas Wellinger	(Slovenia) Lovro Kos	—	
super team		13 January 2024	(Poland) Wisła (Malinka HS134)	L _{ST}	(Slovenia) Anže Lanišek	(Germany) Andreas Wellinger	(Slovenia) Lovro Kos	—	
1100	13	14 January 2024	(Poland) Wisła (Malinka HS134)	L _{799}	(Japan) Ryōyū Kobayashi	(Austria) Stefan Kraft	(Germany) Andreas Wellinger	(Austria) Stefan Kraft	
qualifying		16 January 2024	(Poland) Szczyrk (Skalite HS104)	N _{Qro}	(Japan) Ryōyū Kobayashi	(Slovenia) Anže Lanišek	(Germany) Andreas Wellinger	—	
		17 January 2024	(Poland) Szczyrk (Skalite HS104)	N _{cnx}	cancelled due to strong wind after 40 jumps (rescheduled to Lahti on 1 March)			—	
qualifying		19 January 2024	(Poland) Zakopane (Wielka Krokiew HS140)	L _{Qro}	(Austria) Stefan Kraft	(Germany) Andreas Wellinger	(Austria) Manuel Fettner	—	
team		20 January 2024	(Poland) Zakopane (Wielka Krokiew HS140)	L _{T}	(Austria) Stefan Kraft	(Germany) Andreas Wellinger	(Japan) Ren Nikaidō	—	
1101	14	21 January 2024	(Poland) Zakopane (Wielka Krokiew HS140)	L _{800}	(Austria) Stefan Kraft	(Germany) Andreas Wellinger	(Slovenia) Anže Lanišek	(Austria) Stefan Kraft	
1st PolSKI Tour Overall (Note: General classification of PolSKI Tour included the team's points from the super team (Wisła) and the men's team event (Zakopane) as well as the points from the two best jumpers of a given team in three qualifying rounds and three individual events. The winning team received a prize of EUR 50,000.) (12 – 21 January 2024)					Austria	Slovenia	Germany	PolSKI Tour	
FIS Ski Flying World Championships 2024 (25 – 28 January • (Austria) Bad Mitterndorf)
1102	15	3 February 2024	(Germany) Willingen (Mühlenkopf HS147)	L _{801}	(Norway) Johann André Forfang	(Japan) Ryōyū Kobayashi	(Norway) Kristoffer Eriksen Sundal	(Austria) Stefan Kraft	
1103	16	4 February 2024	(Germany) Willingen (Mühlenkopf HS147)	L _{802}	(Germany) Andreas Wellinger	(Japan) Ryōyū Kobayashi	(Switzerland) Gregor Deschwanden	(Austria) Stefan Kraft	
1104	17	10 February 2024	(United States) Lake Placid (MacKenzie Int. HS128)	L _{803}	(Slovenia) Lovro Kos	(Japan) Ryōyū Kobayashi	(Norway) Marius Lindvik	(Austria) Stefan Kraft	
1105	18	11 February 2024	(United States) Lake Placid (MacKenzie Int. HS128)	L _{804}	(Austria) Stefan Kraft	(Slovenia) Lovro Kos (Germany) Philipp Raimund		(Austria) Stefan Kraft	
1106	19	17 February 2024	(Japan) Sapporo (Ōkurayama HS137)	L _{805}	(Austria) Stefan Kraft	(Japan) Ryōyū Kobayashi	(Germany) Andreas Wellinger	(Austria) Stefan Kraft	
1107	20	18 February 2024	(Japan) Sapporo (Ōkurayama HS137)	L _{806}	(Slovenia) Domen Prevc	(Japan) Ryōyū Kobayashi	(Norway) Kristoffer Eriksen Sundal	(Austria) Stefan Kraft	
1108	21	24 February 2024	(Germany) Oberstdorf (Heini-Klopfer HS235)	F _{141}	(Slovenia) Timi Zajc	(Slovenia) Peter Prevc	(Austria) Stefan Kraft	(Austria) Stefan Kraft	
1109	22	25 February 2024	(Germany) Oberstdorf (Heini-Klopfer HS235)	F _{142}	(Austria) Stefan Kraft	(Slovenia) Peter Prevc	(Japan) Ryōyū Kobayashi	(Austria) Stefan Kraft	
1110	23	(Note: Men's individual cancelled competition from Szczyrk (17 January) was rescheduled to Lahti (1 March).)1 March 2024	(Finland) Lahti (Salpausselkä HS130)	L _{807}	(Slovenia) Lovro Kos	(Germany) Andreas Wellinger	(Japan) Ryōyū Kobayashi	(Austria) Stefan Kraft	
1111	24	3 March 2024	(Finland) Lahti (Salpausselkä HS130)	L _{808}	(Austria) Jan Hörl	(Slovenia) Peter Prevc	(Poland) Aleksander Zniszczoł	(Austria) Stefan Kraft	
prologue		8 March 2024	(Norway) Oslo (Holmenkollen HS134)	L _{Qro}	(Austria) Daniel Huber	(Norway) Johann André Forfang	(Norway) Marius Lindvik	—	
1112	25	9 March 2024	(Norway) Oslo (Holmenkollen HS134)	L _{809}	(Austria) Stefan Kraft	(Norway) Kristoffer Eriksen Sundal	(Austria) Jan Hörl	(Austria) Stefan Kraft	
prologue		10 March 2024	(Norway) Oslo (Holmenkollen HS134)	L _{Qro}	(Austria) Stefan Kraft	(Japan) Ryōyū Kobayashi	(Austria) Manuel Fettner	—	
1113	26	10 March 2024	(Norway) Oslo (Holmenkollen HS134)	L _{810}	(Norway) Johann André Forfang	(Japan) Ryōyū Kobayashi	(Austria) Stefan Kraft	(Austria) Stefan Kraft	
1114	27	12 March 2024	(Norway) Trondheim (Granåsen HS105/138)	N _{162}	(Japan) Ryōyū Kobayashi	(Slovenia) Peter Prevc	(Austria) Jan Hörl	(Austria) Stefan Kraft	
1115	28	13 March 2024	(Norway) Trondheim (Granåsen HS105/138)	L _{811}	(Austria) Stefan Kraft	(Austria) Daniel Tschofenig	(Austria) Jan Hörl	(Austria) Stefan Kraft	
prologue		15 March 2024	(Norway) Vikersund (Vikersundbakken HS240)	F _{Qro}	(Slovenia) Peter Prevc	(Austria) Stefan Kraft	(Austria) Daniel Huber	—	
		16 March 2024	(Norway) Vikersund (Vikersundbakken HS240)	F _{cnx}	cancelled due to bad weather and rescheduled on 16 March			—	
1116	29	(Note: Cancelled individual men's ski flying event in Vikersund (16 March) was rescheduled to 17 March due to strong wind (with only one round).)17 March 2024	(Norway) Vikersund (Vikersundbakken HS240)	F _{143}	(Austria) Stefan Kraft	(Austria) Daniel Huber	(Slovenia) Domen Prevc	(Austria) Stefan Kraft	
1117	30	(Note: 2nd Individual men's ski flying event in Vikersund (17 March) had 3 rounds.)17 March 2024	(Norway) Vikersund (Vikersundbakken HS240)	F _{144}	(Austria) Daniel Huber	(Austria) Stefan Kraft	(Slovenia) Timi Zajc	(Austria) Stefan Kraft	
7th Raw Air Men's Overall (8 – 17 March 2024)					(Austria) Stefan Kraft	(Slovenia) Peter Prevc	(Austria) Daniel Huber	Raw Air	
qualifying		21 March 2024	(Slovenia) Planica (Letalnica b. Gorišek HS240)	F _{Qro}	(Japan) Ryōyū Kobayashi	(Poland) Piotr Żyła	(Austria) Daniel Huber	—	
1118	31	22 March 2024	(Slovenia) Planica (Letalnica b. Gorišek HS240)	F _{145}	(Slovenia) Peter Prevc	(Austria) Daniel Huber	(Norway) Johann André Forfang	(Austria) Stefan Kraft	
team		23 March 2024	(Slovenia) Planica (Letalnica b. Gorišek HS240)	F _{T}	(Austria) Daniel Huber	(Japan) Ryōyū Kobayashi	(Slovenia) Peter Prevc	—	
1119	32	24 March 2024	(Slovenia) Planica (Letalnica b. Gorišek HS240)	F _{146}	(Austria) Daniel Huber	(Slovenia) Domen Prevc	(Poland) Aleksander Zniszczoł	(Austria) Stefan Kraft	
6th Planica7 Overall (21 – 24 March 2024)					(Austria) Daniel Huber	(Slovenia) Peter Prevc	(Norway) Johann André Forfang	Planica7	
45th FIS World Cup Men's Overall (25 November 2023 – 24 March 2024)					(Austria) Stefan Kraft	(Japan) Ryōyū Kobayashi	(Germany) Andreas Wellinger	World Cup Overall	

=== Standings ===
==== Overall ====
Rank	after 32 events	Points
	(Austria) Stefan Kraft	2149
2	(Japan) Ryōyū Kobayashi	1673
3	(Germany) Andreas Wellinger	1488
4	(Austria) Jan Hörl	1140
5	(Slovenia) Peter Prevc	1071
6	(Austria) Michael Hayböck	882
7	(Norway) Johann André Forfang	867
8	(Norway) Marius Lindvik	854
9	(Slovenia) Lovro Kos	792
10	(Germany) Pius Paschke	778

==== Nations Cup ====
Rank	after 38 events	Points
	Austria	8149
2	Slovenia	5142
3	Germany	5022
4	Norway	4360
5	Japan	3275
6	Poland	2158
7	Switzerland	898
8	Italy	633
9	Finland	590
10	United States	512

==== Prize money ====
Rank	after 41 payouts	CHF
1	(Austria) Stefan Kraft	373,150
2	(Japan) Ryōyū Kobayashi	338,600
3	(Germany) Andreas Wellinger	212,050
4	(Austria) Jan Hörl	154,850
5	(Slovenia) Peter Prevc	151,650
6	(Norway) Johann André Forfang	129,500
7	(Austria) Michael Hayböck	128,950
8	(Slovenia) Lovro Kos	121,050
9	(Austria) Daniel Huber	116,000
10	(Norway) Marius Lindvik	114,450

==== Ski flying ====
Rank	after 6 events	Points
	(Austria) Daniel Huber	429
2	(Austria) Stefan Kraft	426
3	(Slovenia) Peter Prevc	382
4	(Slovenia) Timi Zajc	296
5	(Slovenia) Domen Prevc	270
6	(Japan) Ryōyū Kobayashi	189
7	(Germany) Andreas Wellinger	174
8	(Norway) Johann André Forfang	172
9	(Poland) Aleksander Zniszczoł	160
10	(Austria) Michael Hayböck	157

==== Four Hills Tournament ====
Rank	after 4 events	Points
	(Japan) Ryōyū Kobayashi	1145.2
2	(Germany) Andreas Wellinger	1120.7
3	(Austria) Stefan Kraft	1112.7
4	(Austria) Jan Hörl	1093.5
5	(Slovenia) Anže Lanišek	1089.1
6	(Austria) Michael Hayböck	1066.9
7	(Slovenia) Lovro Kos	1043.8
8	(Austria) Clemens Aigner	1042.4
9	(Norway) Marius Lindvik	1029.4
10	(Slovenia) Timi Zajc	1026.0

==== Polish Tour ====
Rank	after 7 events	Points
1	Austria	3872.9
2	Slovenia	3863.0
3	Germany	3743.4
4	Japan	3691.5
5	Norway	3641.8
6	Poland	3532.3
7	Switzerland	3133.6
8	Italy	2889.2
9	United States	2466.2
10	Finland	2332.8

==== Raw Air ====
Rank	after 9 events	Points
1	(Austria) Stefan Kraft	2494.7
2	(Slovenia) Peter Prevc	2369.1
3	(Austria) Daniel Huber	2326.7
4	(Slovenia) Timi Zajc	2281.9
5	(Austria) Michael Hayböck	2239.8
6	(Germany) Andreas Wellinger	2227.3
7	(Austria) Daniel Tschofenig	2155.4
8	(Switzerland) Gregor Deschwanden	2123.5
9	(Poland) Aleksander Zniszczoł	2121.8
10	(Slovenia) Domen Prevc	1986.6

==== Planica7 ====
Rank	after 4 events	Points
1	(Austria) Daniel Huber	1374.6
2	(Slovenia) Peter Prevc	1282.4
3	(Norway) Johann André Forfang	1256.5
4	(Austria) Stefan Kraft	1251.7
5	(Japan) Ryōyū Kobayashi	1235.1
6	(Poland) Aleksander Zniszczoł	1231.2
7	(Austria) Daniel Tschofenig	1215.5
8	(Poland) Piotr Żyła	1214.7
9	(Germany) Pius Paschke	1207.8
10	(Slovenia) Domen Prevc	1204.6

== Women's individual ==
=== Calendar ===
Event key: N – normal hill / L – large hill / F – flying hill
All	No.	Date	Place (Hill)	Size	Winner	Second	Third	Overall Leader	R.
210	1	2 December 2023	(Norway) Lillehammer (Lysgårdsbakken HS98/140)	N _{155}	(Japan) Yūki Itō	(France) Joséphine Pagnier	(Canada) Alexandria Loutitt	(Japan) Yūki Itō	
211	2	3 December 2023	(Norway) Lillehammer (Lysgårdsbakken HS98/140)	L _{056}	(France) Joséphine Pagnier	(Canada) Alexandria Loutitt	(Norway) Eirin Maria Kvandal	(France) Joséphine Pagnier	
212	3	15 December 2023	(Switzerland) Engelberg (Gross-Titlis HS140)	L _{057}	(France) Joséphine Pagnier	(Canada) Alexandria Loutitt	(Slovenia) Ema Klinec	(France) Joséphine Pagnier	
213	4	16 December 2023	(Switzerland) Engelberg (Gross-Titlis HS140)	L _{058}	(Slovenia) Nika Prevc	(Slovenia) Ema Klinec	(Norway) Eirin Maria Kvandal	(France) Joséphine Pagnier	
214	5	30 December 2023	(Germany) Garmisch-Pa (Olympiaschanze HS142)	L _{059}	(Slovenia) Nika Prevc	(Norway) Eirin Maria Kvandal	(Canada) Abigail Strate	(France) Joséphine Pagnier	
215	6	1 January 2024	(Germany) Oberstdorf (Schattenberg HS137)	L _{060}	(Austria) Eva Pinkelnig	(Canada) Abigail Strate	(Norway) Eirin Maria Kvandal (Austria) Jacqueline Seifriedsberger	(France) Joséphine Pagnier	
1st 2-Nights-Tour Overall (30 December 2023 – 1 January 2024)					(Slovenia) Nika Prevc	(Austria) Eva Pinkelnig	(Canada) Abigail Strate	2-Nights-Tour	
216	7	3 January 2024	(Austria) Villach (Alpenarena HS98)	N _{156}	(Slovenia) Nika Prevc	(Austria) Eva Pinkelnig	(Canada) Abigail Strate	(Slovenia) Nika Prevc	
217	8	4 January 2024	(Austria) Villach (Alpenarena HS98)	N _{157}	(Slovenia) Nika Prevc	(Austria) Eva Pinkelnig	(Slovenia) Nika Križnar	(Slovenia) Nika Prevc	
218	9	13 January 2024	(Japan) Sapporo (Ōkurayama HS137)	L _{061}	(Austria) Eva Pinkelnig	(Finland) Jenny Rautionaho	(Norway) Eirin Maria Kvandal	(Slovenia) Nika Prevc	
219	10	14 January 2024	(Japan) Sapporo (Ōkurayama HS137)	L _{062}	(Japan) Yūki Itō	(Germany) Katharina Schmid	(Slovenia) Nika Križnar	(Slovenia) Nika Prevc	
220	11	19 January 2024	(Japan) Zaō (Yamagata HS102)	N _{158}	(Slovenia) Nika Prevc	(Japan) Yūki Itō	(Canada) Alexandria Loutitt	(Slovenia) Nika Prevc	
		21 January 2024	(Japan) Zaō (Yamagata HS102)	N _{cnx}	cancelled due to strong wind and heavy rain with snow (rescheduled to Planica on 21 March)			—	
221	12	27 January 2024	(Slovenia) Ljubno (Note: Due to the floods that hit Slovenia in August 2023, the ski jumping hill in Ljubno ob Savinji was partially destroyed and it was then still not known if the competition would take place. Later the organizers announced that the competitions were not in danger and they went on as planned.) (Savina HS94)	N _{159}	(Austria) Eva Pinkelnig	(Slovenia) Nika Prevc	(Canada) Alexandria Loutitt	(Slovenia) Nika Prevc	
222	13	28 January 2024	(Slovenia) Ljubno (Savina HS94)	N _{160}	(Slovenia) Nika Prevc	(Austria) Eva Pinkelnig	(Slovenia) Nika Križnar	(Slovenia) Nika Prevc	
223	14	3 February 2024	(Germany) Willingen (Mühlenkopf HS147)	L _{063}	(Austria) Jacqueline Seifriedsberger	(Japan) Sara Takanashi	(Germany) Katharina Schmid	(Slovenia) Nika Prevc	
224	15	4 February 2024	(Germany) Willingen (Mühlenkopf HS147)	L _{064}	(Norway) Silje Opseth	(Slovenia) Nika Prevc	(Japan) Yūki Itō	(Slovenia) Nika Prevc	
		17 February 2024	(Romania) Râșnov (Trambulina HS97)	N _{cnx}	cancelled due to unfavorable snow conditions			—	
		18 February 2024	(Romania) Râșnov (Trambulina HS97)	N _{cnx}	cancelled due to unfavorable snow conditions			—	
225	16	24 February 2024	(Austria) Hinzenbach (Aigner-Schanze HS90)	N _{161}	(Austria) Eva Pinkelnig	(Austria) Jacqueline Seifriedsberger	(Germany) Katharina Schmid	(Slovenia) Nika Prevc	
226	17	25 February 2024	(Austria) Hinzenbach (Aigner-Schanze HS90)	N _{162}	(Austria) Eva Pinkelnig	(Slovenia) Nika Prevc	(Austria) Jacqueline Seifriedsberger	(Slovenia) Nika Prevc	
227	18	1 March 2024	(Finland) Lahti (Salpausselkä HS130)	L _{065}	(Slovenia) Nika Križnar	(Austria) Jacqueline Seifriedsberger	(Austria) Eva Pinkelnig	(Slovenia) Nika Prevc	
prologue		8 March 2024	(Norway) Oslo (Holmenkollen HS134)	L _{Qro}	(Norway) Eirin Maria Kvandal	(Norway) Silje Opseth	(Austria) Eva Pinkelnig	—	
228	19	(Note: Individual women's event in Oslo (9 March) had only one round due to strong wind.)9 March 2024	(Norway) Oslo (Holmenkollen HS134)	L _{066}	(Norway) Silje Opseth	(Germany) Katharina Schmid	(Norway) Eirin Maria Kvandal	(Slovenia) Nika Prevc	
prologue		10 March 2024	(Norway) Oslo (Holmenkollen HS134)	L _{Qro}	(Norway) Eirin Maria Kvandal	(Germany) Katharina Schmid	(Slovenia) Nika Križnar	—	
229	20	10 March 2024	(Norway) Oslo (Holmenkollen HS134)	L _{067}	(Norway) Eirin Maria Kvandal	(Slovenia) Nika Prevc	(Austria) Eva Pinkelnig	(Slovenia) Nika Prevc	
prologue		12 March 2024	(Norway) Trondheim (Granåsen HS105/138)	N _{Qro}	(Norway) Eirin Maria Kvandal	(Austria) Eva Pinkelnig	(Slovenia) Nika Prevc	—	
230	21	12 March 2024	(Norway) Trondheim (Granåsen HS105/138)	N _{163}	(Norway) Eirin Maria Kvandal	(Austria) Eva Pinkelnig	(Slovenia) Nika Križnar	(Slovenia) Nika Prevc	
prologue		13 March 2024	(Norway) Trondheim (Granåsen HS105/138)	L _{Qro}	(Norway) Eirin Maria Kvandal	(Germany) Katharina Schmid	(Japan) Sara Takanashi	—	
231	22	13 March 2024	(Norway) Trondheim (Granåsen HS105/138)	L _{068}	(Slovenia) Nika Prevc	(Norway) Eirin Maria Kvandal	(Austria) Eva Pinkelnig	(Slovenia) Nika Prevc	
		16 March 2024	(Norway) Vikersund (Vikersundbakken HS240)	F _{cnx}	cancelled due to strong wind			—	
232	23	17 March 2024	(Norway) Vikersund (Vikersundbakken HS240)	F _{001}	(Norway) Eirin Maria Kvandal	(Norway) Silje Opseth	(Slovenia) Ema Klinec	(Slovenia) Nika Prevc	
5th Raw Air Women's Overall (8 – 17 March 2024)					(Norway) Eirin Maria Kvandal	(Norway) Silje Opseth	(Austria) Eva Pinkelnig	Raw Air	
233	24	(Note: Women's individual cancelled event in Zaō (19 January) was rescheduled to Planica (21 March).)21 March 2024	(Slovenia) Planica (Srednja skakalnica HS102)	N _{164}	(Austria) Eva Pinkelnig	(Canada) Alexandria Loutitt	(Slovenia) Nika Prevc	(Slovenia) Nika Prevc	
13th FIS World Cup Women's Overall (2 December 2023 – 21 March 2024)					(Slovenia) Nika Prevc	(Austria) Eva Pinkelnig	(Canada) Alexandria Loutitt	World Cup Overall	

=== Standings ===
==== Overall ====
Rank	after 24 events	Points
	(Slovenia) Nika Prevc	1454
2	(Austria) Eva Pinkelnig	1305
3	(Canada) Alexandria Loutitt	1030
4	(Japan) Yūki Itō	1018
5	(Austria) J. Seifriedsberger	935
6	(Slovenia) Nika Križnar	893
7	(Norway) Eirin Maria Kvandal (France) Joséphine Pagnier	843
9	(Japan) Sara Takanashi	799
10	(Germany) Katharina Schmid	751

==== Nations Cup ====
Rank	after 25 events	Points
	Austria	3891
2	Slovenia	3442
3	Japan	2386
4	Norway	2280
5	Germany	1967
6	Canada	1654
7	France	931
8	Finland	815
9	Italy	364
10	Czech Republic	193

==== Prize money ====
Rank	after 27 payouts	CHF
1	(Norway) Eirin Maria Kvandal	75,991
2	(Slovenia) Nika Prevc	75,501
3	(Austria) Eva Pinkelnig	68,715
4	(Canada) Alexandria Loutitt	48,290
5	(Japan) Yūki Itō	45,110
6	(Norway) Silje Opseth	42,774
7	(Austria) J. Seifriedsberger	41,590
8	(Slovenia) Nika Križnar	41,399
9	(France) Joséphine Pagnier	37,185
10	(Japan) Sara Takanashi	35,629

==== Two Nights Tournament ====
Rank	after 2 events	Points
1	(Slovenia) Nika Prevc	527.7
2	(Austria) Eva Pinkelnig	518.1
3	(Canada) Abigail Strate	516.8
4	(Norway) Eirin Maria Kvandal	516.1
5	(Austria) Marita Kramer	483.6
6	(Slovenia) Ema Klinec	480.6
7	(Finland) Jenny Rautionaho	477.2
8	(France) Joséphine Pagnier	477.1
9	(Canada) Alexandria Loutitt	475.7
10	(Japan) Yūki Itō	473.1

==== Raw Air ====
Rank	after 9 events	Points
1	(Norway) Eirin Maria Kvandal	1790.4
2	(Norway) Silje Opseth	1638.4
3	(Austria) Eva Pinkelnig	1634.9
4	(Germany) Katharina Schmid	1599.6
5	(Slovenia) Nika Prevc	1579.0
6	(Slovenia) Nika Križnar	1557.1
7	(Canada) Alexandria Loutitt	1554.0
8	(Japan) Sara Takanashi	1534.8
9	(Austria) J. Seifriedsberger	1530.4
10	(France) Joséphine Pagnier	1472.1

== Team events ==
=== Calendar ===
N – normal hill / L – large hill / F – flying hill
All	No.	Date	Place (Hill)	Size	Winner	Second	Third	R.
Men's team
120	1	20 January 2024	(Poland) Zakopane (Wielka Krokiew HS140)	L _{092}	Austria: 1. Michael Hayböck; 2. Manuel Fettner; 3. Jan Hörl; 4. Stefan Kraft	Slovenia: 1. Lovro Kos; 2. Domen Prevc; 3. Peter Prevc; 4. Anže Lanišek	Germany: 1. Pius Paschke; 2. Karl Geiger; 3. Stephan Leyhe; 4. Andreas Wellinger	
121	2	2 March 2024	(Finland) Lahti (Salpausselkä HS130)	L _{093}	Norway: 1. Johann André Forfang; 2. Halvor Egner Granerud; 3. Kristoffer Eriksen Sundal; 4. Marius Lindvik	Austria: 1. Daniel Tschofenig; 2. Stephan Embacher; 3. Jan Hörl; 4. Stefan Kraft	Germany: 1. Pius Paschke; 2. Stephan Leyhe; 3. Philipp Raimund; 4. Andreas Wellinger	
122	3	(Note: Men's team event in Planica (23 March) had only one round due to strong wind.)23 March 2024	(Slovenia) Planica (Letalnica b. Gorišek HS240)	F _{027}	Austria: 1. Daniel Tschofenig; 2. Michael Hayböck; 3. Stefan Kraft; 4. Daniel Huber	Slovenia: 1. Lovro Kos; 2. Domen Prevc; 3. Timi Zajc; 4. Peter Prevc	Norway: 1. Robert Johansson; 2. Benjamin Østvold; 3. Marius Lindvik; 4. Johann André Forfang	
Men's super team
3	1	13 January 2024	(Poland) Wisła (Malinka HS134)	L _{002}	Slovenia: 1. Lovro Kos; 2. Anže Lanišek	Austria: 1. Manuel Fettner; 2. Jan Hörl	Germany: 1. Stephan Leyhe; 2. Andreas Wellinger	
4	2	10 February 2024	(United States) Lake Placid (MacKenzie Int. HS128)	L _{003}	Austria: 1. Michael Hayböck; 2. Stefan Kraft	Germany: 1. Philipp Raimund; 2. Andreas Wellinger	Norway: 1. Marius Lindvik; 2. Johann André Forfang	
5	3	(Note: Men's super team event in Oberstdorf (23 February) had 2 instead of 3 rounds due to organisational changes.)23 February 2024	(Germany) Oberstdorf (Heini-Klopfer HS235)	F _{001}	Slovenia: 1. Timi Zajc; 2. Domen Prevc	Norway: 1. Kristoffer Eriksen Sundal; 2. Johann André Forfang	Austria: 1. Michael Hayböck; 2. Stefan Kraft	
Women's super team
2	1	20 January 2024	(Japan) Zaō (Yamagata HS102)	N _{002}	Slovenia: 1. Nika Križnar; 2. Nika Prevc	Canada: 1. Abigail Strate; 2. Alexandria Loutitt	Austria: 1. Jacqueline Seifriedsberger; 2. Eva Pinkelnig	

== Podium table by nation ==
Table showing the World Cup podium places (gold–1st place, silver–2nd place, bronze–3rd place) by the countries represented by the athletes.

Rank	Nation	Gold	Silver	Bronze	Total
1	Austria	27	16	17	60
2	Slovenia	17	13	11	41
3	Norway	8	6	11	25
4	Germany	5	9	12	26
5	Japan	4	12	4	20
6	France	2	1	0	3
7	Canada	0	5	5	10
8	Switzerland	0	1	1	2
9	Finland	0	1	0	1
10	Poland	0	0	2	2
Totals (10 entries)		63	64	63	190

== Points distribution ==
The table shows the number of points won in the 2023/24 FIS Ski Jumping World Cup for men and women.

Place	1	2	3	4	5	6	7	8	9	10	11	12	13	14	15	16	17	18	19	20	21	22	23	24	25	26	27	28	29	30
Individual	100	80	60	50	45	40	36	32	29	26	24	22	20	18	16	15	14	13	12	11	10	9	8	7	6	5	4	3	2	1
Team	400	350	300	250	200	150	100	50
Super Team	200	160	120	100	80	70	60	50	40	30	20	10

== Qualifications ==
In case the number of participating athletes is 50 (men) / 40 (women) or lower, a Prologue competition round must be organized.

=== Men ===
No.	Place	Qualifications	Competition	Size	Winner	R.
1	(Finland) Ruka	24 November 2023	25 November 2023	L	(Germany) Andreas Wellinger	
2	(Finland) Ruka	26 November 2023		L	(Norway) Johann André Forfang	
3	(Norway) Lillehammer	1 December 2023	2 December 2023	N	(Austria) Stefan Kraft	
4	(Norway) Lillehammer	3 December 2023		L	(Austria) Stefan Kraft	
5	(Germany) Klingenthal	8 December 2023	9 December 2023	L	(Japan) Ryōyū Kobayashi	
6	(Germany) Klingenthal	10 December 2023		L	(Japan) Ryōyū Kobayashi	
7	(Switzerland) Engelberg	15 December 2023	16 December 2023	L	(Slovenia) Anže Lanišek	
8	(Switzerland) Engelberg	17 December 2023		L	(Slovenia) Anže Lanišek	
9	(Germany) Oberstdorf	28 December 2023	29 December 2023	L	(Germany) Andreas Wellinger	
10	(Germany) Garmisch-Pa	31 December 2023	1 January 2024	L	(Slovenia) Anže Lanišek	
11	(Austria) Innsbruck	2 January 2024	3 January 2024	L	(Slovenia) Anže Lanišek	
12	(Austria) Bischofshofen	5 January 2024	6 January 2024	L	(Japan) Ryōyū Kobayashi	
13	(Poland) Wisła	12 January 2024	14 January 2024	L	(Slovenia) Anže Lanišek	
14	(Poland) Szczyrk	16 January 2024	17 January 2024	N	(Japan) Ryōyū Kobayashi	
15	(Poland) Zakopane	19 January 2024	21 January 2024	L	(Austria) Stefan Kraft	
16	(Germany) Willingen	2 February 2024	3 February 2024	L	(Norway) Johann André Forfang (Japan) Ryōyū Kobayashi	
17	(Germany) Willingen	4 February 2024		L	(Norway) Marius Lindvik	
18	(United States) Lake Placid	9 February 2024	10 February 2024	L	(Slovenia) Lovro Kos	
	(United States) Lake Placid	11 February 2024		L	cancelled due to organizational changes	
19	(Japan) Sapporo	16 February 2024	17 February 2024	L	(Austria) Manuel Fettner	
20	(Japan) Sapporo	18 February 2024		L	(Germany) Karl Geiger	
21	(Germany) Oberstdorf	24 February 2024		F	(Austria) Stefan Kraft	
22	(Germany) Oberstdorf	25 February 2024		F	(Austria) Stefan Kraft	
23	(Finland) Lahti	1 March 2024		L	(Austria) Stefan Kraft	
24	(Finland) Lahti	3 March 2024		L	(Japan) Ryōyū Kobayashi	
25	(Norway) Oslo	8 March 2024	9 March 2024	L	(Austria) Daniel Huber	
26	(Norway) Oslo	10 March 2024		L	(Austria) Stefan Kraft	
27	(Norway) Vikersund	15 March 2024	16 March 2024	F	(Slovenia) Peter Prevc	
28	(Slovenia) Planica	21 March 2024	22 March 2024	F	(Japan) Ryōyū Kobayashi	

=== Women ===
No.	Place	Qualifications	Competition	Size	Winner	R.
1	(Norway) Lillehammer	1 December 2023	2 December 2023	N	(Canada) Alexandria Loutitt	
2	(Norway) Lillehammer	3 December 2023		L	(Canada) Alexandria Loutitt	
3	(Switzerland) Engelberg	14 December 2023	15 December 2023	L	(France) Joséphine Pagnier	
4	(Switzerland) Engelberg	16 December 2023		L	(Norway) Eirin Maria Kvandal	
5	(Germany) Garmisch-Pa	30 December 2023		L	(Austria) Eva Pinkelnig	
6	(Germany) Oberstdorf	1 January 2024		L	(Canada) Alexandria Loutitt	
7	(Austria) Villach	3 January 2024		N	(Slovenia) Nika Prevc	
8	(Austria) Villach	4 January 2024		N	(Slovenia) Nika Prevc	
9	(Japan) Sapporo	13 January 2024		L	(France) Joséphine Pagnier	
10	(Japan) Sapporo	14 January 2024		L	(France) Joséphine Pagnier	
11	(Japan) Zaō	18 January 2024	19 January 2024	N	(Slovenia) Nika Križnar	
	(Japan) Zaō	21 January 2024		N	cancelled due to strong wind and heavy rain with snow	
12	(Slovenia) Ljubno	26 January 2024	27 January 2024	N	(Slovenia) Nika Prevc	
13	(Slovenia) Ljubno	28 January 2024		N	(Slovenia) Nika Prevc	
14	(Germany) Willingen	2 February 2024	3 February 2024	L	(Norway) Silje Opseth (Prologue)	
15	(Germany) Willingen	4 February 2024		L	(Canada) Alexandria Loutitt (Prologue)	
	(Romania) Râșnov	16 February 2024	17 February 2024	N	cancelled due to unfavorable snow conditions	
	(Romania) Râșnov	18 February 2024		N	cancelled due to unfavorable snow conditions	
16	(Austria) Hinzenbach	24 February 2024		N	(Canada) Alexandria Loutitt	
17	(Austria) Hinzenbach	25 February 2024		N	(Slovenia) Nika Prevc	
18	(Finland) Lahti	29 February 2024	1 March 2024	L	(Norway) Eirin Maria Kvandal	
19	(Norway) Oslo	8 March 2024	9 March 2024	L	(Norway) Eirin Maria Kvandal	
20	(Norway) Oslo	10 March 2024		L	(Norway) Eirin Maria Kvandal	
21	(Norway) Trondheim	12 March 2024		N	(Norway) Eirin Maria Kvandal	
22	(Norway) Trondheim	13 March 2024		L	(Norway) Eirin Maria Kvandal	

== Prize money distribution ==
The total prize money for each individual World Cup event is 86,100 Swiss franc (CHF) for men and 30,229 CHF for women. Men's qualification winners also received an additional 3,000 CHF on normal and large hills and 5,000 CHF on ski-flying hills.

=== Men ===
Rank	CHF
1st	13,000
2nd	10,000
3rd	8,000
4th	6,000
5th	5,200
6th	4,500
7th	3,600
8th	3,200
9th	2,900
10th	2,600
11th	2,400
12th	2,200
13th	2,100
14th	2,000
15th	1,900
16th	1,800
17th	1,700
18th	1,600
19th	1,500
20th	1,400
21st	1,300
22nd	1,200
23rd	1,100
24th	1,000
25th	900
26th	800
27th	700
28th	600
29th	500
30th	400

=== Women ===
Rank	CHF
1st	4,300
2nd	3,440
3rd	2,580
4th	2,150
5th	1,935
6th	1,720
7th	1,548
8th	1,376
9th	1,247
10th	1,118
11th	1,032
12th	946
13th	860
14th	774
15th	688
16th	645
17th	602
18th	559
19th	516
20th	473
21st	430
22nd	387
23rd	344
24th	301
25th	258

=== Team events ===
Rank	Men / Mixed	Super team	
Rank	Men / Mixed	Women	Men
1st	7,500	1,500	11,000
2nd	4,750	1,000	7,500
3rd	3,000	800	5,000
4th	2,000	700	4,000
5th	1,500	600	3,500
6th	1,000	500	3,000
7th	750	475	2,500
8th	500	425	2,000
9th	not awarded		1,250
10th	not awarded		1,000
11th	not awarded		750
12th	not awarded		500
Total	84,000 CHF	12,000 CHF	84,000 CHF

=== Tournaments ===
	Champion	Second	Third
Raw Air
Men & Women	40,000 CHF	13,000 CHF	6,000 CHF
Four Hills Tournament
Men	100,000 CHF	not awarded	
2-Nights-Tour
Women	10,000 CHF	5,000 CHF	3,000 CHF
Planica 7
Men	20,000 CHF	not awarded	
PolSKI Tour
Men	50,000 EUR (Team)	not awarded	

== Achievements ==
First World Cup career victory

Men

- (Germany) Pius Paschke (33), in his 11th season – the WC 7 in Engelberg
- (Slovenia) Lovro Kos (24), in his 4th season – the WC 17 in Lake Placid

Women

- (France) Joséphine Pagnier (21), in her 6th season – the WC 2 in Lillehammer
- (Slovenia) Nika Prevc (18), in her 3rd season – the WC 4 in Engelberg

First World Cup podium

Men

- (Germany) Pius Paschke (33), in his 11th season – the WC 1 in Ruka – 2nd place
- (Switzerland) Gregor Deschwanden (32), in his 14th season – the WC 6 in Klingenthal – 2nd place
- (Germany) Philipp Raimund (23), in his 4th season – the WC 18 in Lake Placid – 2nd place
- (Norway) Kristoffer Eriksen Sundal (22), in his 2nd season – the WC 15 in Willingen – 3rd place
- (Poland) Aleksander Zniszczoł (29), in his 12th season – the WC 24 in Lahti – 3rd place

Women

- (Finland) Jenny Rautionaho (27), in her 7th season – the WC 9 in Sapporo – 2nd place

Number of wins this season (in brackets are all-time wins)

Men

- (Austria) Stefan Kraft – 13 (43)
- (Japan) Ryōyū Kobayashi – 2 (32)
- (Germany) Karl Geiger – 2 (15)
- (Germany) Andreas Wellinger – 2 (7)
- (Norway) Johann André Forfang – 2 (5)
- (Austria) Jan Hörl – 2 (3)
- (Austria) Daniel Huber – 2 (3)
- (Slovenia) Lovro Kos – 2 (2)
- (Slovenia) Peter Prevc – 1 (24)
- (Slovenia) Anže Lanišek – 1 (6)
- (Slovenia) Domen Prevc – 1 (6)
- (Slovenia) Timi Zajc – 1 (4)
- (Germany) Pius Paschke – 1 (1)

Women

- (Slovenia) Nika Prevc – 7 (7)
- (Austria) Eva Pinkelnig – 6 (15)
- (Norway) Eirin Maria Kvandal – 3 (4)
- (Japan) Yūki Itō – 2 (9)
- (Norway) Silje Opseth – 2 (7)
- (France) Joséphine Pagnier – 2 (2)
- (Slovenia) Nika Križnar – 1 (6)
- (Austria) Jacqueline Seifriedsberger – 1 (2)

== Retirements ==
The following ski jumpers, who competed in the World Cup, retired during or after the 2023–24 season:

Men

- (Czech Republic) Kryštof Hauser
- (Czech Republic) František Holík
- (Norway) Thomas Aasen Markeng
- (Poland) Klemens Murańka
- (Switzerland) Dominik Peter
- (Slovenia) Peter Prevc
- (Austria) Markus Rupitsch
- (Czech Republic) Radek Rýdl
- (Japan) Reruhi Shimizu
- (Norway) Daniel-André Tande
- (Japan) Hiroaki Watanabe

Women

- (Russia) Irina Avvakumova (career suspension)
- (France) Julia Clair
- (Austria) Katharina Ellmauer
- (Slovenia) Urša Križnar (career suspension)
- (Norway) Maren Lundby
- (Kosovo) Sophie Sorschag

== See also ==
- 2023 FIS Ski Jumping Grand Prix
- 2023–24 FIS Ski Jumping Continental Cup (men)
- 2023–24 FIS Ski Jumping Inter-Continental Cup (women)
- 2023–24 FIS Cup (ski jumping)
