= Raw Air 2024 =

Ski jumping competition

2024 Raw Air
Discipline	Men	Women
Overall	(Austria) Stefan Kraft	(Norway) Eirin Maria Kvandal

Competition
Edition	7th	5th
Locations	3	3
Individual	9	9
Cancelled		1
Rescheduled	1	

The Raw Air 2024 was the seventh edition of Raw Air for men and the fifth edition for women, an eight-day tournament in ski jumping and ski flying held across Norway between 8 and 17 March 2024. It was part of the 2023–24 World Cup season.

== Details ==
For the first time in the history of Raw Air:

- the tournament program includes competitions on three different sizes – the normal, large and flying hill,
- a women's ski flying World Cup will be held,
- the top 3 men's and women's jumpers of the tournament will receive equal money prizes (1st place – 40 000 EUR, 2nd place – 13 000 EUR, 3rd place – 6 000 EUR).

== Venues ==
(Norway) Oslo	(Norway) Trondheim	(Norway) Vikersund
Holmenkollbakken	Granåsen	Vikersundbakken
Norway

== Competition format ==
The competition is held on three different hills: Oslo, Trondheim and Vikersund.

Men:

Oslo

- Friday prologue - starting list arranged according to the world cup classification
- Saturday and Sunday - starting list arranged according to the Raw Air classification
- 6 competition jumps - Friday prologue, Saturday competition and Sunday prologue and competition

Trondheim

- Only the top 50 of the Raw Air tournament after the competition in Oslo can compete
- Guaranteed start for jumpers in the top 3 of the World Cup before Raw Air (Kraft, Kobayashi, Wellinger)
- Starting list arranged according to Raw Air classification
- 4 tournament jumps - Tuesday's competition on HS105 and Wednesday's competition on HS138 (without prologues)

Vikersund

- Starting list arranged according to Raw Air classification
- Friday's prologue featuring the top 50 of the Raw Air tournament
- Saturday competition for the top 40 of prologue
- Sunday's three-series competition for the top 30 Raw Air (1st round - 30; 2nd round - 20; 3rd round - 10 jumpers)
- Starting order of the 1st and 2nd series of the final according to Saturday's Raw Air classification; 3rd series according to the current classification
- 6 tournament jumps - Friday prologue, Saturday competition, Sunday three-series competition

Women:

- Competitions in Oslo and Trondheim with the jumpers of all competitors registered for the tournament (prologues and competitions)
- The starting list is arranged according to the World Cup classification
- A maximum of 20 jumpers will compete in Vikersund - priority is given to the top 15 in the World Cup standings
- A maximum of 5 jumpers from the Raw Air Top 15 who are not in the World Cup top 15 will be selected for the competition.
- 16 tournament jumps - 6 in Oslo, 6 in Trondheim and 4 in Vikersund

== Results ==
=== Men ===
NH – normal hill / LH – large hill / FH – flying hill
All	#	Date	Place (Hill)	Size	Event	Winner	Second	Third	Raw Air leader	R.
55	1	8 March 2024	(Norway) Oslo (Holmenkollbakken HS134)	LH	prologue (1R)	(Austria) Daniel Huber	(Norway) Johann André Forfang	(Norway) Marius Lindvik	(Austria) Daniel Huber	
56	2	9 March 2024	(Norway) Oslo (Holmenkollbakken HS134)	LH	individual (2R)	(Austria) Stefan Kraft	(Norway) Kristoffer Eriksen Sundal	(Austria) Jan Hörl	(Austria) Daniel Huber	
57	3	10 March 2024	(Norway) Oslo (Holmenkollbakken HS134)	LH	prologue (1R)	(Austria) Stefan Kraft	(Japan) Ryōyū Kobayashi	(Austria) Manuel Fettner	(Austria) Stefan Kraft	
58	4	10 March 2024	(Norway) Oslo (Holmenkollbakken HS134)	LH	individual (2R)	(Norway) Johann André Forfang	(Japan) Ryōyū Kobayashi	(Austria) Stefan Kraft	(Austria) Stefan Kraft	
59	5	12 March 2024	(Norway) Trondheim (Granåsen HS105/138)	NH	individual (2R)	(Japan) Ryōyū Kobayashi	(Slovenia) Peter Prevc	(Austria) Jan Hörl	(Austria) Stefan Kraft	
60	6	13 March 2024	(Norway) Trondheim (Granåsen HS105/138)	LH	individual (2R)	(Austria) Stefan Kraft	(Austria) Daniel Tschofenig	(Austria) Jan Hörl	(Austria) Stefan Kraft	
61	7	15 March 2024	(Norway) Vikersund (Vikersundbakken HS240)	FH	prologue (1R)	(Slovenia) Peter Prevc	(Austria) Stefan Kraft	(Austria) Daniel Huber	(Austria) Stefan Kraft	
62	8	17 March 2024	(Norway) Vikersund (Vikersundbakken HS240)	FH	individual (1R) (Note: Rescheduled)	(Austria) Stefan Kraft	(Austria) Daniel Huber	(Slovenia) Domen Prevc	(Austria) Stefan Kraft	
63	9	17 March 2024	(Norway) Vikersund (Vikersundbakken HS240)	FH	individual (3R)	(Austria) Daniel Huber	(Austria) Stefan Kraft	(Slovenia) Timi Zajc	(Austria) Stefan Kraft	
7th Raw Air Overall (8–17 March 2024)					15R	(Austria) Stefan Kraft	(Slovenia) Peter Prevc	(Austria) Daniel Huber		

=== Women ===
NH – normal hill / LH – large hill / FH – flying hill
All	#	Date	Place (Hill)	Size	Event	Winner	Second	Third	Raw Air leader	R.
29	1	8 March 2024	(Norway) Oslo (Holmenkollbakken HS134)	LH	prologue (1R)	(Norway) Eirin Maria Kvandal	(Norway) Silje Opseth	(Austria) Eva Pinkelnig	(Norway) Eirin Maria Kvandal	
30	2	9 March 2024	(Norway) Oslo (Holmenkollbakken HS134)	LH	individual (1R) (Note: One round only due to strong wind.)	(Norway) Silje Opseth	(Germany) Katharina Schmid	(Norway) Eirin Maria Kvandal	(Norway) Eirin Maria Kvandal	
31	3	10 March 2024	(Norway) Oslo (Holmenkollbakken HS134)	LH	prologue (1R)	(Norway) Eirin Maria Kvandal	(Germany) Katharina Schmid	(Slovenia) Nika Križnar	(Norway) Eirin Maria Kvandal	
32	4	10 March 2024	(Norway) Oslo (Holmenkollbakken HS134)	LH	individual (2R)	(Norway) Eirin Maria Kvandal	(Slovenia) Nika Prevc	(Austria) Eva Pinkelnig	(Norway) Eirin Maria Kvandal	
33	5	12 March 2024	(Norway) Trondheim (Granåsen HS105/138)	NH	prologue (1R)	(Norway) Eirin Maria Kvandal	(Austria) Eva Pinkelnig	(Slovenia) Nika Prevc	(Norway) Eirin Maria Kvandal	
34	6	12 March 2024	(Norway) Trondheim (Granåsen HS105/138)	NH	individual (2R)	(Norway) Eirin Maria Kvandal	(Austria) Eva Pinkelnig	(Slovenia) Nika Križnar	(Norway) Eirin Maria Kvandal	
35	7	13 March 2024	(Norway) Trondheim (Granåsen HS105/138)	LH	prologue (1R)	(Norway) Eirin Maria Kvandal	(Germany) Katharina Schmid	(Japan) Sara Takanashi	(Norway) Eirin Maria Kvandal	
36	8	13 March 2024	(Norway) Trondheim (Granåsen HS105/138)	LH	individual (2R)	(Slovenia) Nika Prevc	(Norway) Eirin Maria Kvandal	(Austria) Eva Pinkelnig	(Norway) Eirin Maria Kvandal	
37	9	16 March 2024	(Norway) Vikersund (Vikersundbakken HS240)	FH	individual	Cancelled			(Norway) Eirin Maria Kvandal	
38	10	17 March 2024	(Norway) Vikersund (Vikersundbakken HS240)	FH	individual (2R)	(Norway) Eirin Maria Kvandal	(Norway) Silje Opseth	(Slovenia) Ema Klinec	(Norway) Eirin Maria Kvandal	
5th Raw Air Overall (8–17 March 2024)					13R	(Norway) Eirin Maria Kvandal	(Norway) Silje Opseth	(Austria) Eva Pinkelnig		
