= Raw Air =

Ski jumping tournament held in Norway

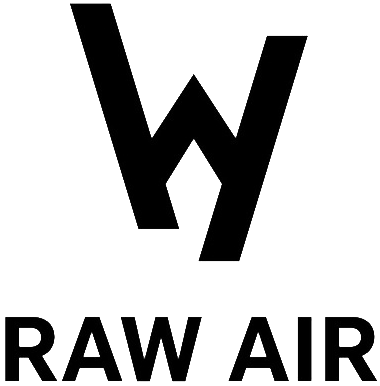
- Genre: ski jumping ski flying
- Locations: (Norway) Oslo (5 rounds) (Norway) Lillehammer (3 rounds) (Norway) Trondheim (3 rounds) (Norway) Vikersund (5 rounds)
- Inaugurated: 10 March 2017 (Men); 9 March 2019 (Women)
- Founder: Arne Åbråten
- Organiser: International Ski Federation

Raw Air is a series of ski jumping competitions in ski jumping and ski flying in venues across Norway, taking place starting from the 2016–17 season. Founded by Arne Åbråten, it is organized as part of the FIS World Cup.

== Competition ==
=== Prize money ===
	Winner	2nd	3rd
Men's	€60,000	€30,000	€10,000
Women's	€35,000	€15,000	€5,000

=== Locations ===
Men's competition will be held on four different ski jumping hills in this order: Oslo (Holmenkollbakken), Lillehammer (Lysgårdsbakken), Trondheim (Granåsen) and Vikersund (Vikersundbakken).

Women's competition will be held on three hills other than Vikersund.

=== Format ===
The competition will last for ten days in a row, with no break and 10 events with total of 16 rounds from individual events, team events and qualifications (prologues):

	Men		Women	
	Events	Rounds	Events	Rounds
Individual	4	8 (4x2)	3	6 (3x2)
Qualifications	4	4 (4x1)	3	3 (3x1)
Team	2	4 (2x2)	0	0
Total	10	16	6	9

== Hosts ==
=== Map ===
Raw Air (Norway)

=== Hill records ===
#	Image	Name	Location	Hill record
1		Holmenkollbakken	Oslo	144.0 m (472 ft) (Norway) Robert Johansson
2		Lysgårdsbakken	Lillehammer	146.0 m (479 ft) (Switzerland) Simon Ammann
3		Granåsen	Trondheim	146.0 m (479 ft) (Poland) Kamil Stoch
4		Vikersundbakken	Vikersund	253.5 m (832 ft) (Austria) Stefan Kraft

== Edition ==
=== Men ===
Year	Date	Winner	Second	Third	Rounds
2017	10–19 March	(Austria) Stefan Kraft	(Poland) Kamil Stoch	(Germany) Andreas Wellinger	14/16
2018	9–18 March	(Poland) Kamil Stoch	(Norway) Robert Johansson	(Norway) Andreas Stjernen	16/16
2019	8–17 March	(Japan) Ryōyū Kobayashi	(Austria) Stefan Kraft	(Norway) Robert Johansson	15/16
2020	6–11 March	(Poland) Kamil Stoch	(Japan) Ryōyū Kobayashi	(Norway) Marius Lindvik	9/16
2022	2–6 March	(Austria) Stefan Kraft	(Germany) Karl Geiger	(Japan) Ryōyū Kobayashi	9/9
2023	10–19 March	(Norway) Halvor Egner Granerud	(Austria) Stefan Kraft	(Slovenia) Anže Lanišek	18/18
2024	8–17 March	(Austria) Stefan Kraft	(Slovenia) Peter Prevc	(Austria) Daniel Huber	15/15
2025	13–16 March	(Germany) Andreas Wellinger	(Slovenia) Domen Prevc	(Japan) Ryōyū Kobayashi	7/10

=== Women ===
Year	Date	Winner	Second	Third	Rounds
2019	9–14 March	(Norway) Maren Lundby	(Germany) Katharina Althaus	(Germany) Juliane Seyfarth	9/9
2020	7–11 March	(Norway) Maren Lundby	(Norway) Silje Opseth	(Austria) Eva Pinkelnig	7/9
2022	2–6 March	(Slovenia) Nika Križnar	(Japan) Sara Takanashi	(Slovenia) Urša Bogataj	12/12
2023	10–19 March	(Slovenia) Ema Klinec	(Germany) Katharina Althaus	(Germany) Selina Freitag	14/14
2024	8–17 March	(Norway) Eirin Maria Kvandal	(Norway) Silje Opseth	(Austria) Eva Pinkelnig	13/13
2025	13–16 March	(Slovenia) Nika Prevc	(Norway) Eirin Maria Kvandal	(Norway) Anna Odine Strøm	4/7
