= Raw Air 2023 =

Ski jumping competition

2023 Raw Air
Discipline	Men	Women
Overall	(Norway) Halvor Egner Granerud	(Slovenia) Ema Klinec

Competition
Edition	6th	4th
Locations	3	3
Individual	12	9

The Raw Air 2023 was the sixth edition of Raw Air for men and the fourth edition for women, a ten-day tournament in ski jumping and ski flying held across Norway between 10 and 19 March 2023. It was part of the 2022–23 World Cup season, except for women's ski flying, which was held as the FIS Cup.

== Competition format ==
The competition was held on three different hills: Oslo, Lillehammer and Vikersund. It lasts for ten consecutive days with a total of 18 rounds from individual events and qualifications (prologues) for men; and for six consecutive days plus the final event after a three-day break with total of 14 rounds from individual events and qualifications (prologues) for women.

== Venues ==
Raw Air 2023 (Norway)

== Results ==
=== Men ===
ON	SN	Date	Place	Hill	Size	Winner	Second	Third	Event	Rounds	Raw Air bib	Ref
43	1	10 March 2023	(Norway) Oslo	Holmenkollbakken HS134	LH	(Poland) Dawid Kubacki	(Slovenia) Timi Zajc	(Austria) Stefan Kraft	prologue	1R	(Poland) Dawid Kubacki	
44	2	11 March 2023	(Norway) Oslo	Holmenkollbakken HS134	LH	(Slovenia) Anže Lanišek	(Austria) Stefan Kraft	(Germany) Karl Geiger	individual	2R	(Slovenia) Anže Lanišek	
45	3	12 March 2023	(Norway) Oslo	Holmenkollbakken HS134	LH	(Norway) Halvor Egner Granerud	(Slovenia) Timi Zajc	(Austria) Stefan Kraft	prologue	1R	(Austria) Stefan Kraft	
46	4	12 March 2023	(Norway) Oslo	Holmenkollbakken HS134	LH	(Austria) Stefan Kraft	(Slovenia) Anže Lanišek	(Poland) Dawid Kubacki	individual	2R	(Austria) Stefan Kraft	
47	5	13 March 2023	(Norway) Lillehammer	Lysgårdsbakken HS140	LH	(Norway) Halvor Egner Granerud	(Norway) Johann André Forfang	(Japan) Ryōyū Kobayashi	prologue	1R	(Norway) Halvor Egner Granerud	
48	6	14 March 2023	(Norway) Lillehammer	Lysgårdsbakken HS140	LH	(Norway) Halvor Egner Granerud	(Austria) Stefan Kraft	(Austria) Manuel Fettner	individual	2R	(Norway) Halvor Egner Granerud	
49	7	15 March 2023	(Norway) Lillehammer	Lysgårdsbakken HS140	LH	(Slovenia) Anže Lanišek	(Norway) Halvor Egner Granerud	(Slovenia) Timi Zajc	prologue	1R	(Norway) Halvor Egner Granerud	
50	8	16 March 2023	(Norway) Lillehammer	Lysgårdsbakken HS140	LH	(Poland) Dawid Kubacki	(Slovenia) Anže Lanišek	(Austria) Daniel Tschofenig	individual	2R	(Norway) Halvor Egner Granerud	
51	9	17 March 2023	(Norway) Vikersund	Vikersundbakken HS240	FH	(Austria) Stefan Kraft	(Austria) Michael Hayböck	(Norway) Halvor Egner Granerud	prologue	1R	(Norway) Halvor Egner Granerud	
52	10	18 March 2023	(Norway) Vikersund	Vikersundbakken HS240	FH	(Norway) Halvor Egner Granerud	(Austria) Stefan Kraft	(Austria) Daniel Tschofenig	individual	2R	(Norway) Halvor Egner Granerud	
53	11	19 March 2023	(Norway) Vikersund	Vikersundbakken HS240	FH	(Austria) Stefan Kraft	(Norway) Halvor Egner Granerud (Norway) Robert Johansson	-	prologue	1R	(Norway) Halvor Egner Granerud	
54	12	19 March 2023	(Norway) Vikersund	Vikersundbakken HS240	FH	(Austria) Stefan Kraft	(Norway) Halvor Egner Granerud	(Slovenia) Anže Lanišek	individual	2R	(Norway) Halvor Egner Granerud	
6th Raw Air Overall						(Norway) Halvor Egner Granerud	(Austria) Stefan Kraft	(Slovenia) Anže Lanišek		18R		

=== Women ===
ON	SN	Date	Place	Hill	Size	Winner	Second	Third	Event	Rounds	Raw Air bib	Ref
20	1	10 March 2023	(Norway) Oslo	Holmenkollbakken HS134	LH	(Slovenia) Ema Klinec	(Japan) Yuki Ito	(Norway) Anna Odine Strøm	prologue	1R	(Slovenia) Ema Klinec	
21	2	11 March 2023	(Norway) Oslo	Holmenkollbakken HS134	LH	(Austria) Chiara Kreuzer	(Slovenia) Ema Klinec	(Norway) Anna Odine Strøm	individual	2R	(Slovenia) Ema Klinec	
22	3	12 March 2023	(Norway) Oslo	Holmenkollbakken HS134	LH	(Norway) Anna Odine Strøm	(Slovenia) Ema Klinec	(Austria) Chiara Kreuzer	prologue	1R	(Slovenia) Ema Klinec	
23	4	12 March 2023	(Norway) Oslo	Holmenkollbakken HS134	LH	(Slovenia) Ema Klinec	(Austria) Chiara Kreuzer	(Norway) Anna Odine Strøm	individual	2R	(Slovenia) Ema Klinec	
24	5	13 March 2023	(Norway) Lillehammer	Lysgårdsbakken HS140	LH	(Japan) Yuki Ito	(Norway) Silje Opseth	(Germany) Katharina Althaus	prologue	1R	(Slovenia) Ema Klinec	
25	6	13 March 2023	(Norway) Lillehammer	Lysgårdsbakken HS140	LH	(Norway) Silje Opseth	(Germany) Selina Freitag	(Slovenia) Ema Klinec	individual	2R	(Slovenia) Ema Klinec	
26	7	14 March 2023	(Norway) Lillehammer	Lysgårdsbakken HS140	LH	(Canada) Alexandria Loutitt	(Germany) Katharina Althaus	(Slovenia) Ema Klinec	prologue	1R	(Slovenia) Ema Klinec	
27	8	15 March 2023	(Norway) Lillehammer	Lysgårdsbakken HS140	LH	(Germany) Katharina Althaus	(Canada) Alexandria Loutitt	(Austria) Eva Pinkelnig	individual	2R	(Slovenia) Ema Klinec	
28	9	19 March 2023	(Norway) Vikersund	Vikersundbakken HS240	FH	(Slovenia) Ema Klinec	(Norway) Silje Opseth	(Japan) Yuki Ito	individual	2R	(Slovenia) Ema Klinec	
4th Raw Air Overall						(Slovenia) Ema Klinec	(Germany) Katharina Althaus	(Germany) Selina Freitag		14R		
