= Eirin Maria Kvandal =

Norwegian ski jumper (born 2001)

Eirin Kvandal
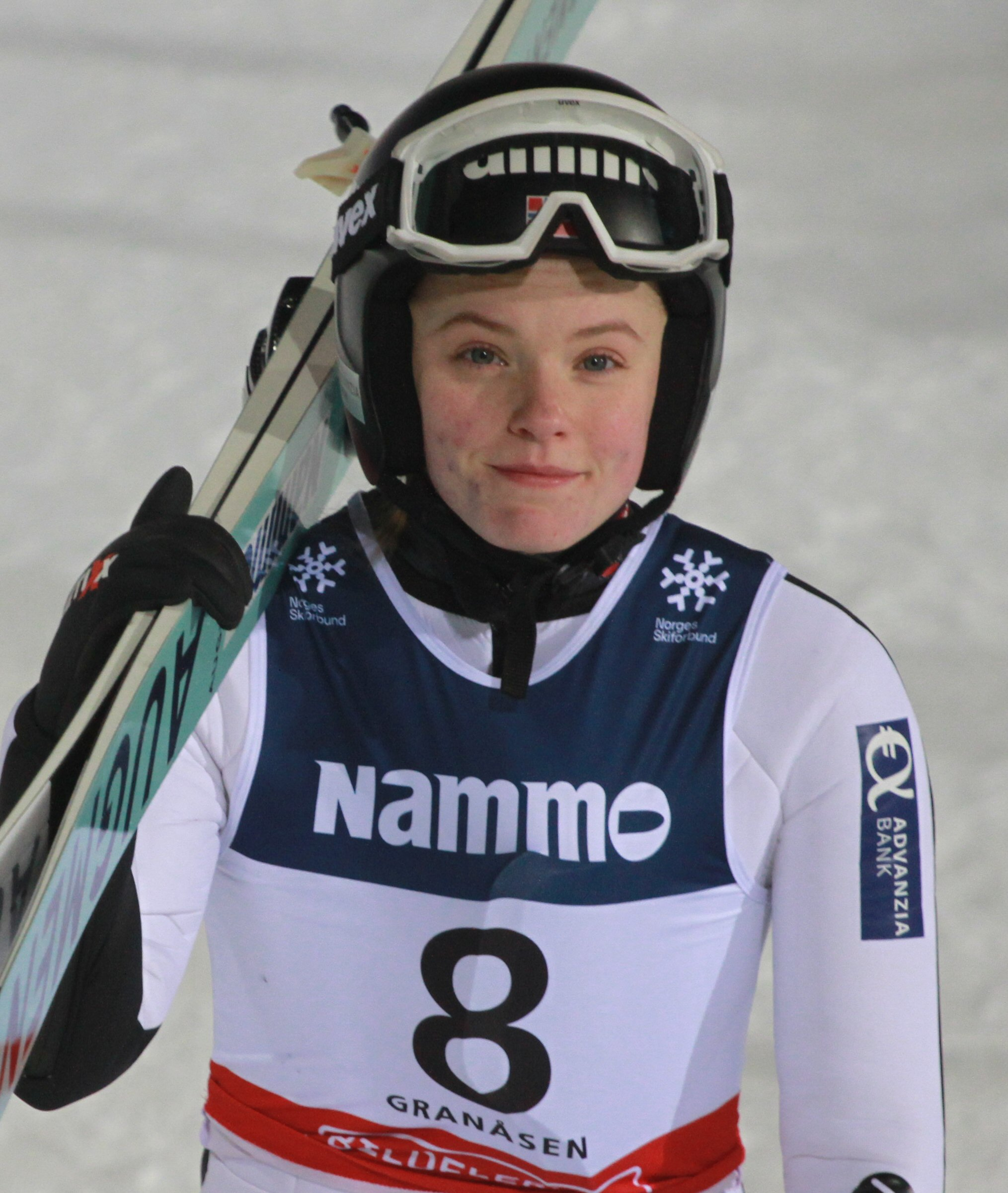
- Kvandal in 2025

Personal information
- Full name: Eirin Maria Kvandal
- Nationality: Norway
- Born: 12 December 2001 (age 24)

Sport
- Sport: Skiing
- Club: Mosjøen IL

World Cup career
- Seasons: 2021–present
- Indiv. starts: 68
- Indiv. podiums: 29
- Indiv. wins: 10
- Team starts: 6
- Team podiums: 5
- Team wins: 1

Achievements and titles
- Personal bests: 231.5 m (760 ft); Vikersund, 22 March 2026
Medal record
Women's ski jumping
Representing Norway
Olympic Games
Silver medal – second place	2026 Milano Cortina	Individual LH
Silver medal – second place	2026 Milano Cortina	Mixed team
World Championships
Gold medal – first place	2025 Trondheim	Team NH
Gold medal – first place	2025 Trondheim	Mixed team LH
Bronze medal – third place	2023 Planica	Team NH
Bronze medal – third place	2025 Trondheim	Individual LH
European Games
Silver medal – second place	2023 Kraków–Małopolska	Mixed team NH
Junior World Championships
Silver medal – second place	2020 Oberwiesenthal	Mixed team NH
- Updated on 28 March 2026

Eirin Maria Kvandal (born 12 December 2001) is a Norwegian ski jumper. She is the 2026 Winter Olympic silver medalist in the mixed team and individual large hill.

== Youth ==
Kvandal comes from Vefsn, near Mosjøen. Inspired by her father, she started ski jumping at age five. She has lived in Trondheim since age fifteen. Kvandal suffered from scoliosis due to genetic factors and had a back surgery in December 2018 to straighten her spinal column.

== Career ==
Kvandal represents the club Mosjøen IL. She competed at the Junior World Championships in 2018 and 2020, winning a silver medal from the mixed team competition at the latter championship. She made her Continental Cup debut in September 2018 and managed two top-10 placements in January and February 2020.

Kvandal belonged to the team for the Raw Air 2020 and started in Trondheim, where she reached 2nd place in training and 18th place in the qualification. The competition itself and the following events were cancelled due to the COVID-19 pandemic.

She made her World Cup debut in December 2020 in Ramsau, finishing 33rd. In her next individual event, January 2021's normal hill in Ljubno, she won the race. With an age of 19 years and 43 days she is the youngest female Norwegian to have won a single's world cup competition. Two weeks later Kvandal suffered a serious knee injury at the world cup in Hinzenbach. She had her comeback in 2022 and participated at the world championships 2023, but had to leave the tournament before the single's competition on the large hill due to an inflammation. One year later she won the Raw Air competition.

Kvandal is a multiple national champion.

== World Cup ==
=== Standings ===
Season	Overall	RA
2020/21	13	N/A
2022/23	26	37
2023/24	7	1
2024/25	4	2

=== Individual wins ===
No.	Season	Date	Location	Hill	Size
1	2020/21	24 January 2021	(Slovenia) Ljubno	Savina HS94	NH
2	2023/24	10 March 2024	(Norway) Oslo	Holmenkollbakken HS134	LH
3	2023/24	12 March 2024	(Norway) Trondheim	Granåsen HS105	NH
4	2023/24	17 March 2024	(Norway) Vikersund	Vikersundbakken HS240	FH
5	2024/25	19 January 2025	(Japan) Sapporo	Ōkurayama HS137	LH
6	2024/25	1 February 2025	(Germany) Willingen	Mühlenkopfschanze HS147	LH
7	2025/26	31 January 2026	(Germany) Willingen	Mühlenkopfschanze HS147	LH
8	2025/26	1 February 2026	(Germany) Willingen	Mühlenkopfschanze HS147	LH
9	2025/26	21 March 2026	(Norway) Vikersund	Vikersundbakken HS240	FH
10	2025/26	22 March 2026	(Norway) Vikersund	Vikersundbakken HS240	FH
11	2026/27	21 November 2026	(Norway) Lillehammer	Lysgardsbakken HS140	LH

=== Individual starts (68) ===
winner (1); second (2); third (3); did not compete (–); disqualified (DQ)
Season	1	2	3	4	5	6	7	8	9	10	11	12	13	14	15	16	17	18	19	20	21	22	23	24	25	26	27	Points
2020/21	Ramsau am Dachstein	Ljubno ob Savinji	Titisee-Neustadt	Titisee-Neustadt	Hinzenbach	Hinzenbach	Hinzenbach	Râșnov	Râșnov	Nizhny Tagil	Nizhny Tagil	Chaykovsky, Perm Krai	Chaykovsky, Perm Krai															249
2020/21	33	1	6	14	3	16	15	–	–	–	–	–	–															249
2022–23	Wisła	Wisła	Lillehammer	Lillehammer	Titisee-Neustadt	Villach	Villach	Ljubno ob Savinji	Ljubno ob Savinji	Sapporo	Sapporo	Zaō Onsen	Zaō Onsen	Hinterzarten	Hinterzarten	Willingen	Willingen	Hinzenbach	Hinzenbach	Râșnov	Râșnov	Oslo	Oslo	Lillehammer	Lillehammer	Lahti		208
2022–23	–	–	10	–	–	–	–	–	–	–	12	14	–	–	–	–	–	–	–	3	–	–	–	7	30	5		208
2023–24	Lillehammer	Lillehammer	Engelberg	Engelberg	Garmisch-Partenkirchen	Oberstdorf	Villach	Villach	Sapporo	Sapporo	Zaō Onsen	Ljubno ob Savinji	Ljubno ob Savinji	Willingen	Willingen	Hinzenbach	Hinzenbach	Lahti	Oslo	Oslo	Trondheim	Trondheim	Vikersund	Planica				843
2023–24	4	3	30	3	2	3	–	–	3	17	14	–	–	–	–	–	–	32	3	1	1	2	1	–				843
