= Felix Peselj =

Italian Nordic combined skier (born 1990)

Felix Peselj (born December 19, 1990) is an Italian World Cup Nordic combined skier. His best result is a 41st place from Vikersund 2009.
