= Raw Air 2022 =

Norwegian ski jumping

2022 Raw Air
Discipline	Men	Women
Overall	(Austria) Stefan Kraft	(Slovenia) Nika Križnar

Competition
Edition	5th	3rd
Locations	2	2
Individual	3	4

The Raw Air 2022 was the fifth edition of Raw Air for men and the third edition for women held across Norway between 2 and 6 March 2022. It was part of the 2021–22 World Cup season.

== Results ==
=== Men ===
Num	Season	Date	Place	Hill	Event	Winner	Second	Third	Leader	Ref.
prologue		2 March 2022	(Norway) Lillehammer	Lysgårdsbakken HS140 (night)	LH	(Norway) Johann André Forfang	(Austria) Stefan Kraft	(Austria) Manuel Fettner	qualification round results	
37	1	3 March 2022	(Norway) Lillehammer	Lysgårdsbakken HS140 (night)	LH	(Austria) Stefan Kraft	(Japan) Ryōyū Kobayashi	(Germany) Karl Geiger	(Japan) Ryōyū Kobayashi	
prologue		5 March 2022	(Norway) Oslo	Holmenkollbakken HS134 (night)	LH	(Poland) Kamil Stoch	(Norway) Marius Lindvik	(Austria) Stefan Kraft (Norway) Robert Johansson	qualification round results	
38	2	5 March 2022	(Norway) Oslo	Holmenkollbakken HS134 (night)	LH	(Norway) Marius Lindvik	(Germany) Markus Eisenbichler	(Norway) Robert Johansson	(Japan) Ryōyū Kobayashi	
prologue		6 March 2022	(Norway) Oslo	Holmenkollbakken HS134 (night)	LH	(Germany) Karl Geiger	(Austria) Stefan Kraft	(Austria) Clemens Aigner	qualification round results	
39	3	6 March 2022	(Norway) Oslo	Holmenkollbakken HS134 (night)	LH	(Norway) Daniel-André Tande	(Slovenia) Anže Lanišek	(Austria) Stefan Kraft	(Japan) Ryōyū Kobayashi	
5th Men's Raw Air Overall (2–6 March)						(Austria) Stefan Kraft	(Germany) Karl Geiger	(Japan) Ryōyū Kobayashi		

=== Women ===
Num	Season	Date	Place	Hill	Event	Winner	Second	Third	Leader	Ref.
prologue		2 March 2022	(Norway) Lillehammer	Lysgårdsbakken HS140 (night)	LH	(Slovenia) Nika Križnar	(Austria) Marita Kramer	(Norway) Silje Opseth	qualification round results	
12	1	2 March 2022	(Norway) Lillehammer	Lysgårdsbakken HS140 (night)	LH	(Japan) Sara Takanashi	(Slovenia) Nika Križnar	(Slovenia) Urša Bogataj	(Austria) Marita Kramer	
prologue		3 March 2022	(Norway) Lillehammer	Lysgårdsbakken HS140 (night)	LH	(Slovenia) Urša Bogataj	(Slovenia) Nika Križnar	(Japan) Sara Takanashi	qualification round results	
13	2	3 March 2022	(Norway) Lillehammer	Lysgårdsbakken HS140 (night)	LH	(Austria) Marita Kramer	(Slovenia) Nika Križnar	(Slovenia) Urša Bogataj	(Austria) Marita Kramer	
prologue		5 March 2022	(Norway) Oslo	Holmenkollbakken HS134 (night)	LH	(Slovenia) Nika Križnar	(Austria) Marita Kramer	(Japan) Yūki Itō	qualification round results	
14	3	5 March 2022	(Norway) Oslo	Holmenkollbakken HS134 (night)	LH	(Norway) Silje Opseth	(Slovenia) Nika Križnar	(Japan) Sara Takanashi	(Austria) Marita Kramer	
prologue		6 March 2022	(Norway) Oslo	Holmenkollbakken HS134 (night)	LH	(Slovenia) Nika Križnar	(Japan) Sara Takanashi	(Slovenia) Urša Bogataj	qualification round results	
15	4	6 March 2022	(Norway) Oslo	Holmenkollbakken HS134 (night)	LH	(Japan) Sara Takanashi	(Slovenia) Urša Bogataj	(Japan) Yūki Itō	(Austria) Marita Kramer	
3rd Women's Raw Air Overall (2–6 March)						(Slovenia) Nika Križnar	(Japan) Sara Takanashi	(Slovenia) Urša Bogataj		
