= Nika Vodan =

Slovenian ski jumper (born 2000)

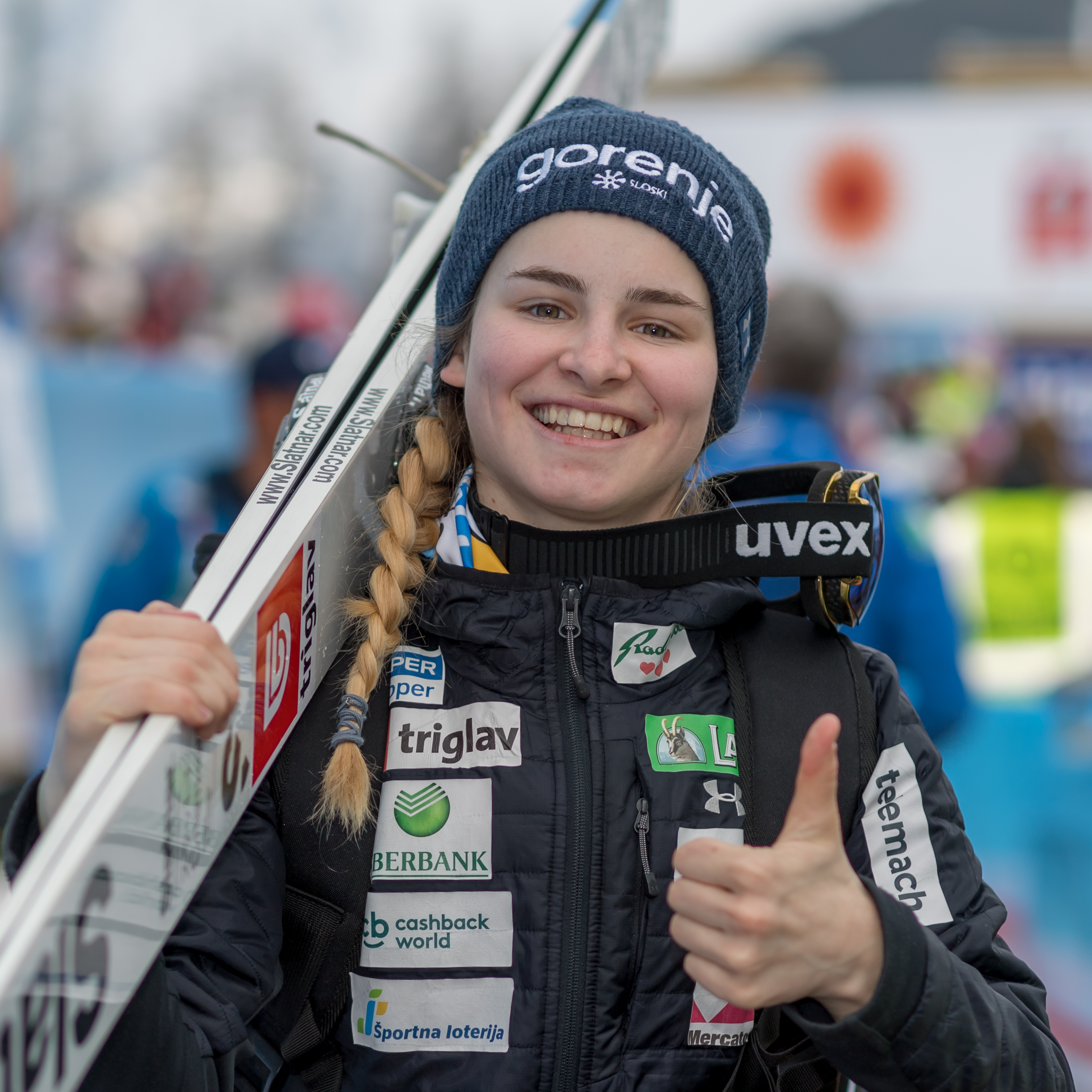
- Vodan in 2019

Personal information
- Born: 9 March 2000 (age 26) Škofja Loka, Slovenia
- Height: 1.66 m (5 ft 5 in)

Sport
- Sport: Ski jumping
- Club: SSK Norica Žiri

World Cup career
- Seasons: 2016–present
- Indiv. starts: 177
- Indiv. podiums: 30
- Indiv. wins: 6
- Team starts: 18
- Team podiums: 11
- Team wins: 4
- Overall titles: 1 (2021)
- Raw Air titles: 1 (2022)

Achievements and titles
- Personal bests: 222.5 m (730 ft); Vikersund, 21 March 2026
Medal record
Women's ski jumping
Representing Slovenia
Olympic Games
Gold medal – first place	2022 Beijing	Mixed team NH
Gold medal – first place	2026 Milano Cortina	Mixed team NH
Bronze medal – third place	2022 Beijing	Individual NH
World Championships
Silver medal – second place	2021 Oberstdorf	Team NH
Bronze medal – third place	2021 Oberstdorf	Individual LH
Bronze medal – third place	2023 Planica	Mixed team NH
European Games
Gold medal – first place	2023 Kraków-Małopolska	Individual LH
Bronze medal – third place	2023 Kraków-Małopolska	Mixed NH
- Updated on 22 November 2026

Nika Vodan (née Križnar; born 9 March 2000) is a Slovenian ski jumper.

== Career ==
In the 2020–21 World Cup season, Križnar won the overall title after finishing nine points above Sara Takanashi. At the 2022 Winter Olympics, she won bronze in the women's normal hill individual event.

== Major tournament results ==
=== Winter Olympics ===
Year	Normal	Large	Mixed
(South Korea) 2018 Pyeongchang	7	N/A	N/A
(China) 2022 Beijing	3rd place, bronze medalist(s)	N/A	1st place, gold medalist(s)
(Italy) 2026 Milano Cortina	8	9	1st place, gold medalist(s)

=== FIS Nordic World Ski Championships ===
Year	Individual		Team	
Year	Normal	Large	Women	Mixed
(Finland) 2017 Lahti	13	N/A	N/A	4
(Austria) 2019 Seefeld	7	N/A	4	4
(Germany) 2021 Oberstdorf	5	3rd place, bronze medalist(s)	2nd place, silver medalist(s)	4
(Slovenia) 2023 Planica	11	10	4	3rd place, bronze medalist(s)

== World Cup results ==
=== Overall standings ===
Season	Position	Points
2015–16	36	40
2016–17	33	74
2017–18	10	383
2018–19	5	826
2019–20	7	497
2020–21	1	871
2021–22	2	1,191
2022–23	9	741
2023–24	6	893
2024–25	46	20
2025–26	10	916

=== Individual wins ===
No.	Season	Date	Location	Hill	Size
1	2020–21	5 February 2021	(Austria) Hinzenbach	Aigner-Schanze HS90	NH
2	2020–21	18 February 2021	(Romania) Râșnov	Trambulina Valea Cărbunării HS97	NH
3	2021–22	31 December 2021	(Slovenia) Ljubno ob Savinji	Savina Ski Jumping Center HS94	NH
4	2021–22	30 January 2022	(Germany) Willingen	Mühlenkopfschanze HS147	LH
5	2021–22	27 February 2022	(Austria) Hinzenbach	Aigner-Schanze HS90	NH
6	2023–24	1 March 2024	(Finland) Lahti	Salpausselkä HS130	LH

=== Individual starts ===
winner (1); second (2); third (3); did not compete (–); failed to qualify (q); disqualified (DQ)
Season	1	2	3	4	5	6	7	8	9	10	11	12	13	14	15	16	17	18	19	20	21	22	23	24	25	26	27	28	29	30	31	32	33
2015–16	Lillehammer	Nizhny Tagil	Nizhny Tagil	Sapporo	Sapporo	Zaō Onsen	Zaō Onsen	Oberstdorf	Oberstdorf	Oslo	Hinzenbach	Hinzenbach	Ljubno ob Savinji	Ljubno ob Savinji	Lahti	Almaty	Almaty
2015–16	–	–	–	–	–	–	–	–	–	–	–	–	14	12	–	–	–
2016–17	Lillehammer	Lillehammer	Nizhny Tagil	Nizhny Tagil	Oberstdorf	Oberstdorf	Sapporo	Sapporo	Zaō Onsen	Zaō Onsen	Râșnov	Râșnov	Hinzenbach	Hinzenbach	Ljubno ob Savinji	Ljubno ob Savinji	Pyeongchang	Pyeongchang	Oslo
2016–17	q	25	16	17	25	29	39	26	16	20	–	–	–	–	–	–	–	–	–
2017–18	Lillehammer	Lillehammer	Lillehammer	Hinterzarten	Sapporo	Sapporo	Zaō Onsen	Zaō Onsen	Ljubno ob Savinji	Ljubno ob Savinji	Râșnov	Râșnov	Oslo	Oberstdorf	Oberstdorf
2017–18	18	10	12	13	22	DQ	7	4	7	12	4	3	17	22	15
2018–19	Lillehammer	Lillehammer	Lillehammer	Prémanon	Prémanon	Sapporo	Sapporo	Zaō Onsen	Zaō Onsen	Râșnov	Râșnov	Hinzenbach	Hinzenbach	Ljubno ob Savinji	Ljubno ob Savinji	Oberstdorf	Oberstdorf	Oslo	Lillehammer	Trondheim	Nizhny Tagil	Nizhny Tagil	Chaykovsky, Perm Krai	Chaykovsky, Perm Krai
2018–19	13	7	10	5	7	14	12	5	12	5	6	5	12	6	4	18	8	8	6	8	16	4	6	3
2019–20	Lillehammer	Lillehammer	Klingenthal	Sapporo	Sapporo	Zaō Onsen	Zaō Onsen	Râșnov	Râșnov	Oberstdorf	Oberstdorf	Hinzenbach	Hinzenbach	Ljubno ob Savinji	Oslo	Lillehammer
2019–20	11	7	12	8	17	6	8	9	11	5	16	10	11	3	5	9
2020–21	Ramsau am Dachstein	Ljubno ob Savinji	Titisee-Neustadt	Titisee-Neustadt	Hinzenbach	Hinzenbach	Hinzenbach	Râșnov	Râșnov	Nizhny Tagil	Nizhny Tagil	Chaykovsky, Perm Krai	Chaykovsky, Perm Krai
2020–21	2	10	5	6	1	2	2	1	3	3	2	3	3
2021–22	Nizhny Tagil	Nizhny Tagil	Lillehammer	Lillehammer	Klingenthal	Klingenthal	Ramsau am Dachstein	Ljubno ob Savinji	Ljubno ob Savinji	Willingen	Willingen	Hinzenbach	Hinzenbach	Lillehammer	Lillehammer	Oslo	Oslo	Oberhof	Oberhof
2021–22	8	7	5	7	4	8	6	1	5	5	1	2	1	2	2	2	4	2	2
2022–23	Wisła	Wisła	Lillehammer	Lillehammer	Titisee-Neustadt	Villach	Villach	Ljubno ob Savinji	Ljubno ob Savinji	Sapporo	Sapporo	Zaō Onsen	Zaō Onsen	Hinterzarten	Hinterzarten	Willingen	Willingen	Hinzenbach	Hinzenbach	Râșnov	Râșnov	Oslo	Oslo	Lillehammer	Lillehammer	Lahti
2022–23	7	4	8	6	6	3	3	6	5	8	5	5	6	11	18	–	–	–	–	–	–	10	8	6	9	19
2023–24	Lillehammer	Lillehammer	Engelberg	Engelberg	Garmisch-Partenkirchen	Oberstdorf	Villach	Villach	Sapporo	Sapporo	Zaō Onsen	Ljubno ob Savinji	Ljubno ob Savinji	Willingen	Willingen	Hinzenbach	Hinzenbach	Lahti	Oslo	Oslo	Trondheim	Trondheim	Vikersund	Planica
2023–24	13	10	8	6	14	14	6	3	–	3	4	5	3	9	5	8	19	1	11	12	3	4	10	11
2024–25	Lillehammer	Lillehammer	Zhangjiakou	Zhangjiakou	Engelberg	Garmisch-Partenkirchen	Oberstdorf	Villach	Villach	Sapporo	Sapporo	Zaō Onsen	Zaō Onsen	Willingen	Lake Placid, New York	Lake Placid, New York	Ljubno ob Savinji	Ljubno ob Savinji	Hinzenbach	Hinzenbach	Oslo	Vikersund	Lahti	Lahti
2024–25	19	25	29	q	–	–	–	–	–	–	–	–	–	–	–	–	–	–	–	–	–	–	–	–
2025–26	Lillehammer	Lillehammer	Falun	Falun	Wisła	Wisła	Klingenthal	Klingenthal	Engelberg	Engelberg	Garmisch-Partenkirchen	Oberstdorf	Villach	Villach	Ljubno ob Savinji	Ljubno ob Savinji	Zhangjiakou	Zhangjiakou	Zaō Onsen	Zaō Onsen	Sapporo	Sapporo	Willingen	Willingen	Hinzenbach	Hinzenbach	Lahti	Lahti	Oslo	Oslo	Vikersund	Vikersund	Planica
2025–26	9	13	5	17	9	2	10	8	15	17	12	10	17	7	6	6	q	–	15	10	10	7	20	6	9	5	13	11	21	10	4	5	9
