= Granåsen =

Ski jumping hill

Coordinates: 63°22′39″N 10°18′33″E

Granåsen ski jump
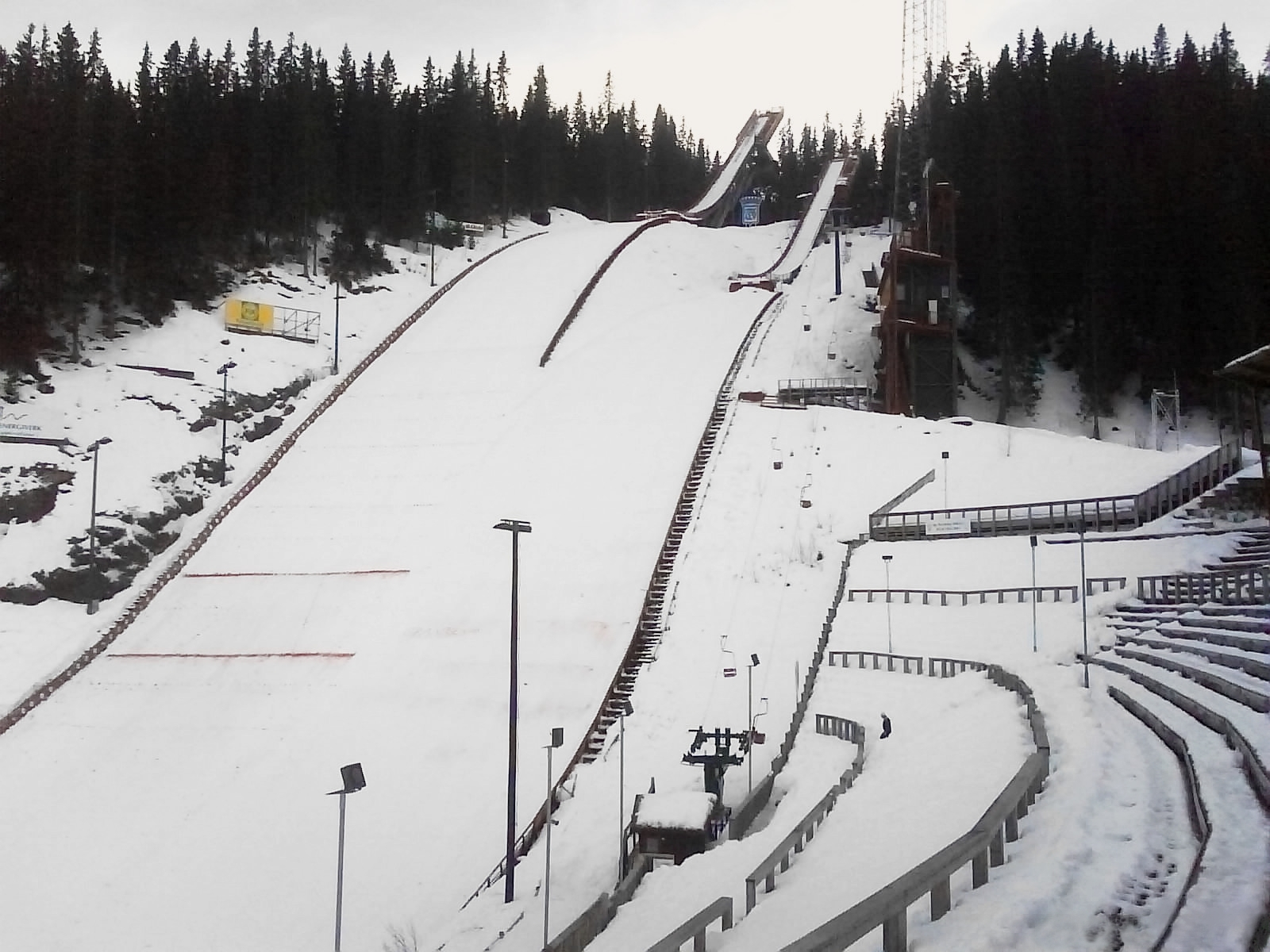
- Location: Trondheim; Norway
- Opened: 1940
- Renovated: 1995
- Expanded: 2008

Size
- K–point: K-93; K-124
- Hill size: HS105; HS138
- Hill record: Normal hill: Female - Sara Takanashi (105.0 m in 2013); Male - Marius Lindvik (108.0 m in 2025); Large hill: Male - Kamil Stoch (146.0 m in 2018)

Top events
- World Championships: World Ski Championships 1997, World Ski Championships 2025

Granåsen is a ski jumping hill, located in Granåsen Ski Centre in Trondheim, Norway. The hill frequently hosts World Cup and Continental Cup competitions arranged by FIS and also hosted the FIS Nordic World Ski Championships 1997. The hill sports one normal sized hill (K-93) and one large hill (K-124).

Before the 2008/2009 season the hill was improved, and the K-spot is now located at 124 meters while the hill size has been increased to 140 meters. After last reconstruction in summer 2018, homologation by FIS reduced the hill size of the large hill to 138 meters. The hill record belongs to Kamil Stoch, who jumped 146 m in March 2018 during the World Cup competition.
