= Vikersund =

Village in Buskerud, Norway

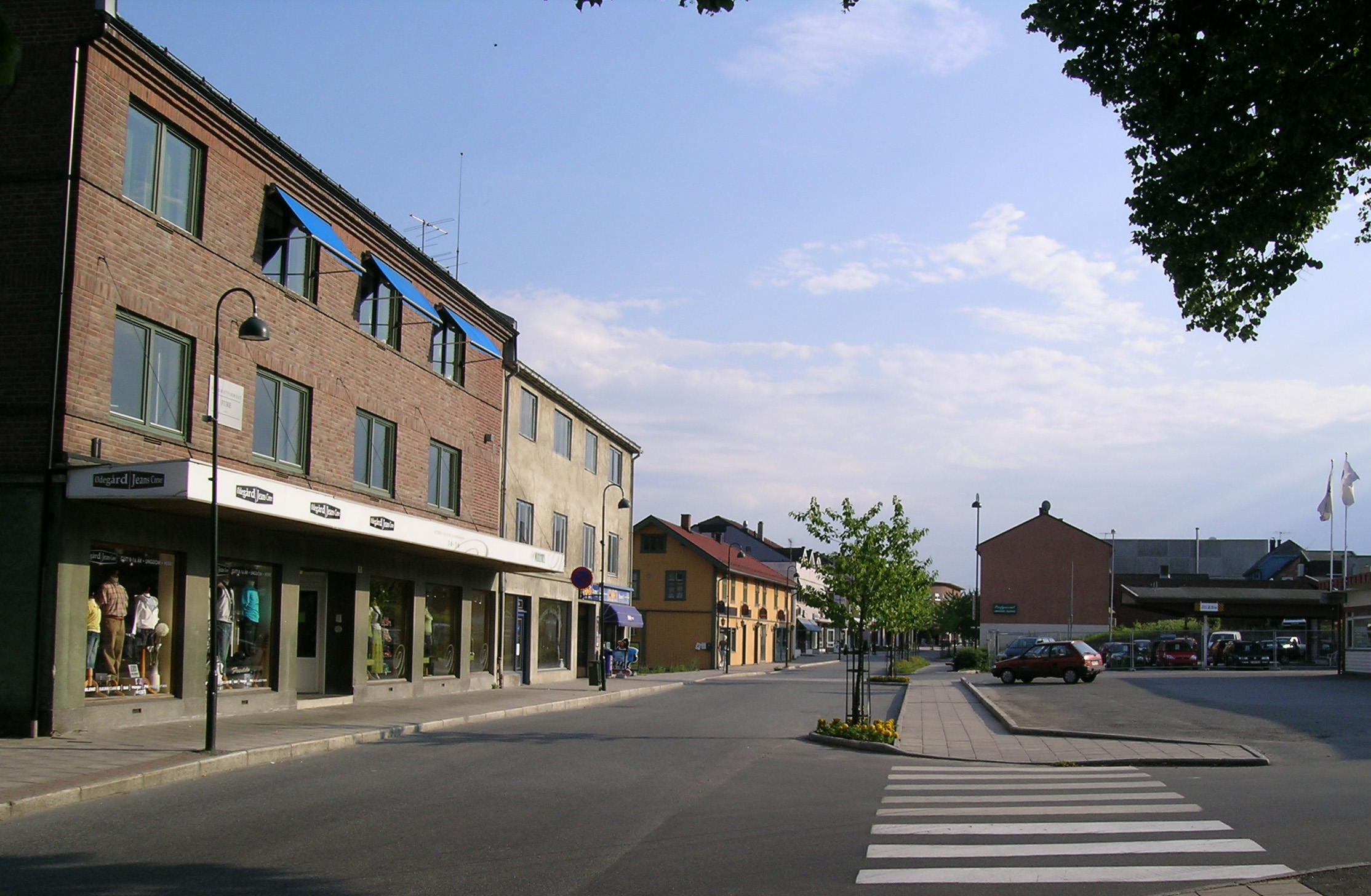
- Central Vikersund in early-July 2006.

- Location within Buskerud Location within Norway
- Coordinates: 59°58′N 9°59′E
- Modum: Buskerud, Norway

Area
  - Total: 2.71 km^{2} (1.05 sq mi)

Population (2020)
  - Total: 3,232

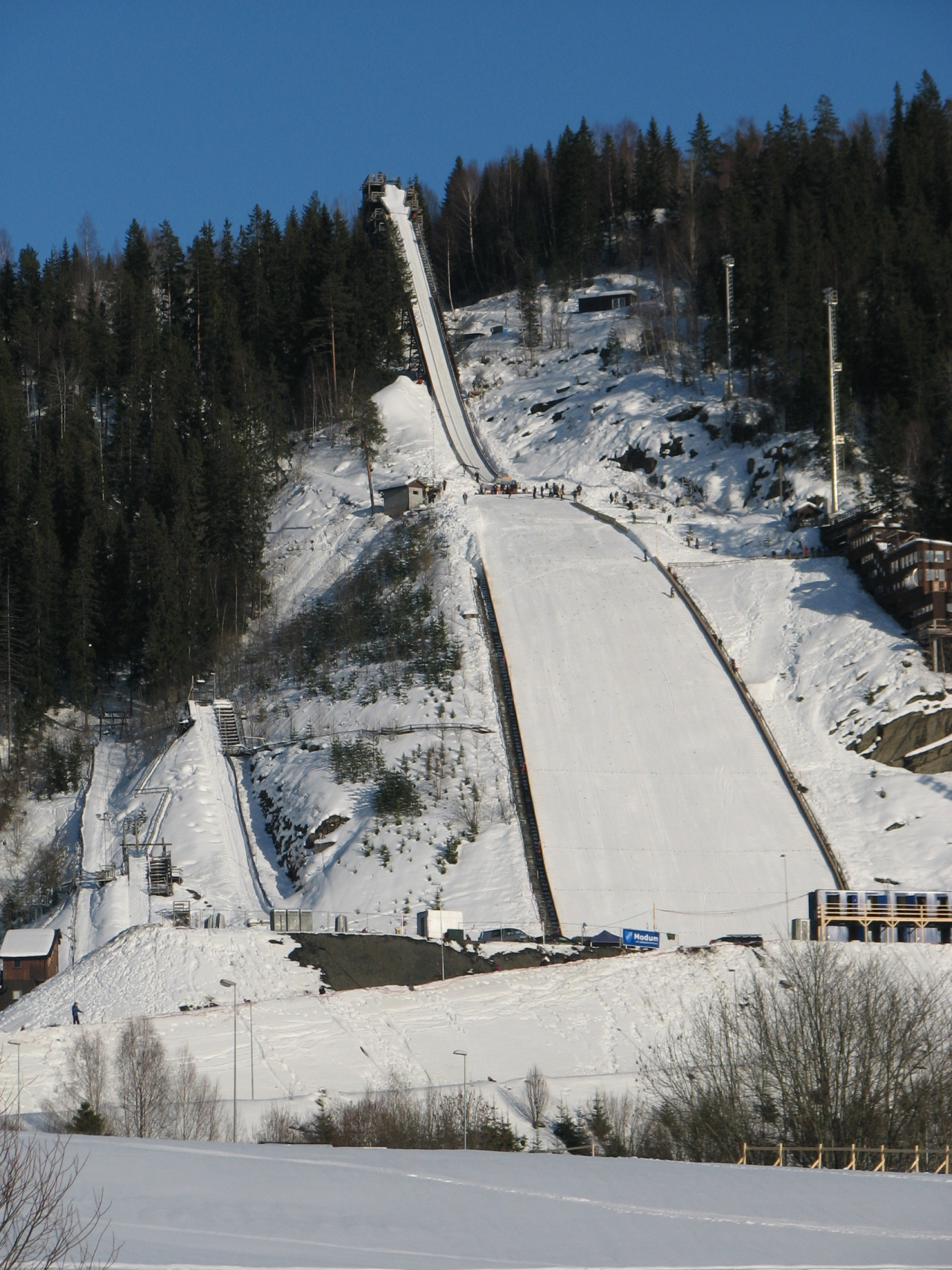
Ski flying hill in Vikersund, Vikersundbakken

Vikersund is a town of 3,232 (in 2020) inhabitants in the municipality capital of Modum, in the county of Buskerud, Norway.

== Overview ==
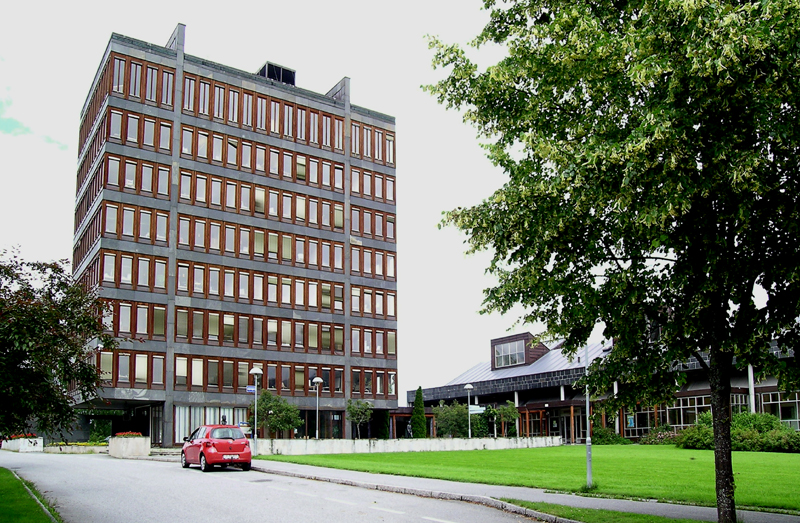
Modum Town Hall at Vikersund

Vikersund is located 30 kilometers south of Hønefoss and 40 kilometers northwest of Drammen. The village is located at the southwestern arm of Tyrifjorden. Drammenselva enters Tyrifjorden by Vikerfossen. Trunk road Highway 35 passes Vikersund. Vikersund station is a railway station on Randsfjordbanen which was established in 1866, two years before Randsfjordbanen between Drammen and Randsfjord was completed.

Vikersund has a primary school - Vikersund primary school and a middle school - North Modum School. Students at NMU from Vikersund school Sysle school and some also come from Stalsberg school (Geithus). Between Vikersund and Krøderen is Krøderbanen museumsjernbane railway museum. Tyrifjord Hotell, situated by the fjord opposite Vikersund, just 3 minutes by car from Vikersund Ski-Jumping Center with the world's largest ski flying hill.

== History ==
Historically, Vikersund been important in the pulp and paper industry. Timber was floated on Tyrifjord past Vikerfossen down the Drammenselva. Modum municipality has many cultural and sports facilities. In Vikersund this includes the Vikersund Ski-Jumping Center with seven ski slopes, golf courses and ski hill. Vikersund is perhaps best known for it ski flying hill, Vikersundbakken. The present large hill was built in 1988 and last modified in 2010. It regularly hosts World Cup in ski flying. It has hosted the FIS Ski Flying World Championships four times and will do so again in 2022. On 18 March 2017 Stefan Kraft set a world record in the ground with 253.5 m, while Dmitriy Vasiliev flew to 254 m, but crashed.

== Vike kirkeruin ==
The ruins of Vike Church (Vike kirkeruin) are located east of Vikersund. It was referred to as the parish church in 1456, but is believed to have dated from the 1200s. The church was presumably abandoned around the Protestant Reformation. The walls stood until late 1700s, but later they are used as a quarry. The foundations were uncovered and excavated in 1969-70 under the direction of Luce Hinsch.

== Other sources ==
- Hinsch, Luce (1987) Monuments and Sites: Norway - A Cultural Heritage (Aschehoug AS) ISBN 978-8200184751
