= 2023–24 FIS Nordic Combined World Cup =

2023–24 season for world cup Nordic combined

Discipline	Men	Women
Overall	(Norway) Jarl Magnus Riiber (5)	(Norway) Ida Marie Hagen (1)
Nations Cup	Austria (5)	Norway (4)
Best Jumper Trophy	(Norway) Jarl Magnus Riiber (4)	(Norway) Gyda Westvold Hansen (4)
Best Skier Trophy	(Germany) Vinzenz Geiger (1)	(Norway) Ida Marie Hagen (2)
Compact Trophy	(Norway) Jarl Magnus Riiber (1)	(Norway) Ida Marie Hagen (1)

Stage events
Ruka Tour	(Norway) Jarl Magnus Riiber (4)	—
German Trophy	(Norway) Jarl Magnus Riiber (1)	(Norway) Ida Marie Hagen (1)
Triple	(Norway) Jarl Magnus Riiber (3)	—

Competition
Edition	41st	4th
Locations	10	8
Individual	21	15
Team	1	–
Mixed	1	1

Overall Champions

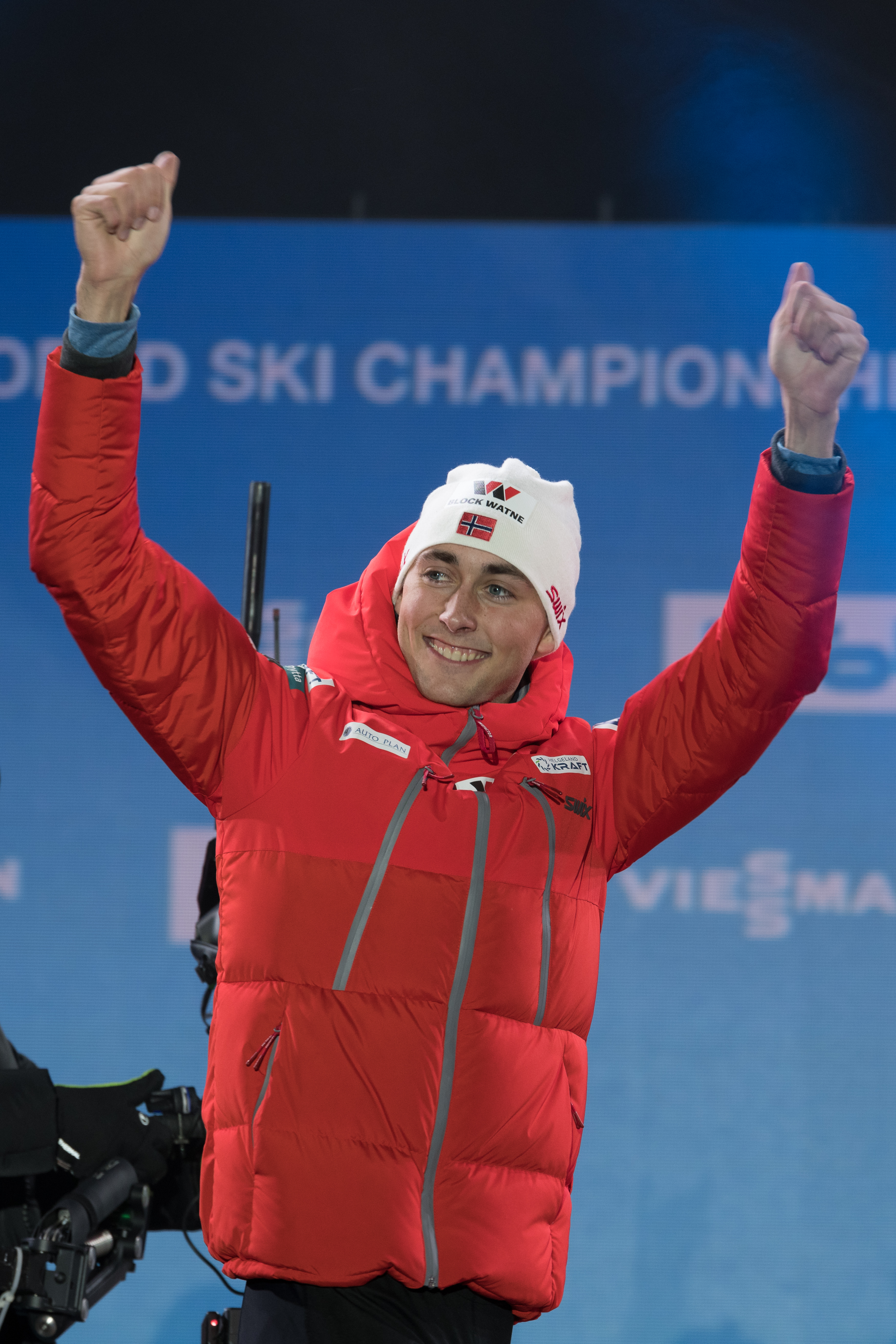
Jarl Magnus Riiber won the fifth World Cup crystal globe in his career, equaling Eric Frenzel. The Norwegian won a record 16 competitions during the season, with a total of 73 victories.

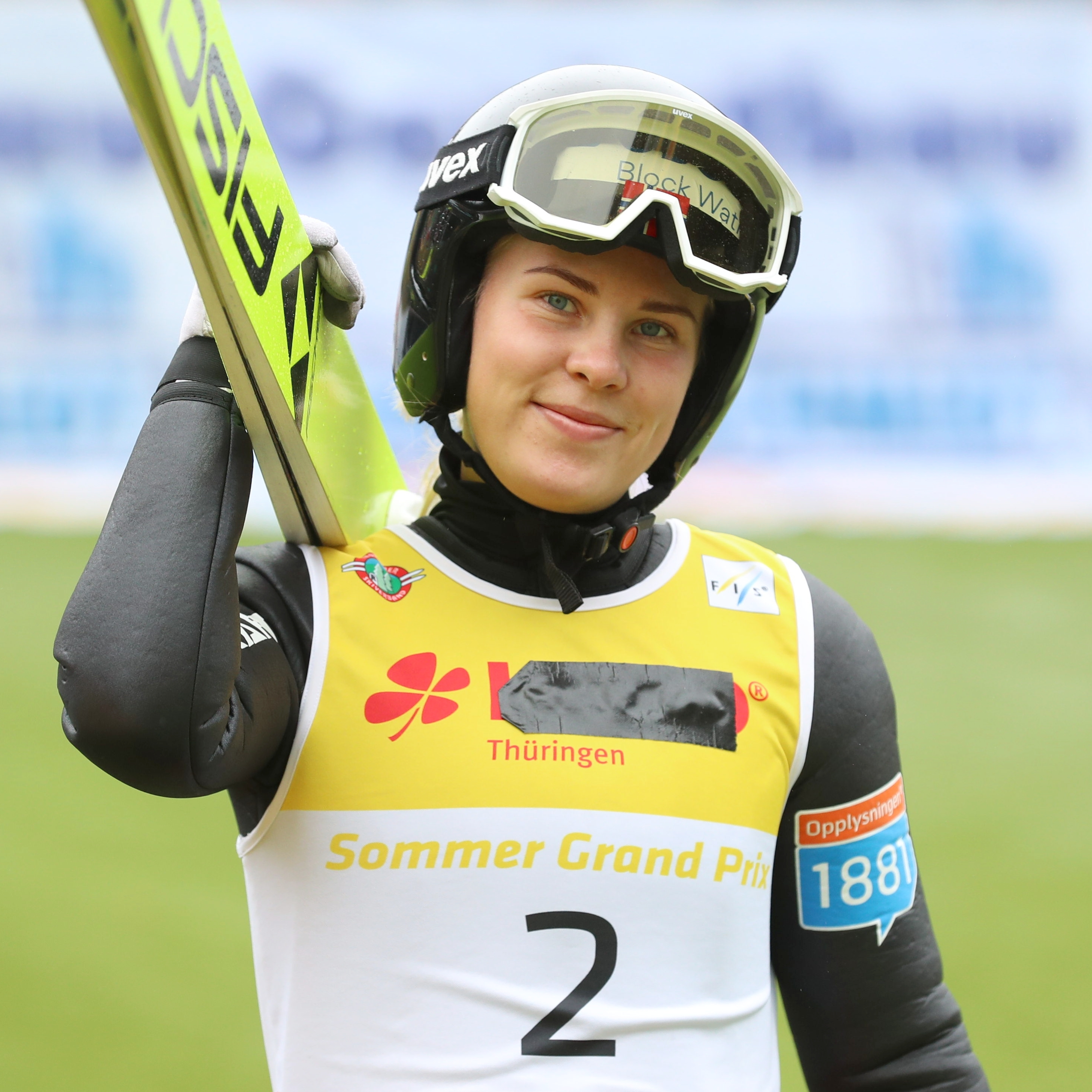
Ida Marie Hagen won the World Cup for the first time in her career, winning 9 of 15 competitions in the season.

The 2023/24 FIS Nordic Combined World Cup, organized by the International Ski Federation (FIS) was the 41st World Cup season in Nordic combined for men and the 4th season for women.

The men's competition started on 24 November 2023 in Ruka, Finland and concluded on 17 March 2024 in Trondheim, Norway. The women's competition started on 1 December 2023 in Lillehammer, Norway and concluded same as men's competitions.

Johannes Lamparter from Austria (men's) and Gyda Westvold Hansen from Norway (women's) were the reigning champions from the previous season. The Austrian finished the season in third place, while the Norwegian finished second.

Jarl Magnus Riiber and Ida Marie Hagen, both from Norway, became the new overall champions.

From this season, the running distance in Gundersen for women can be increased to 7.5 km, although 5 km is still possible.

A new "Individual Compact" format has been introduced, for which a small crystal globe will also be awarded. The jump is followed by a run at fixed intervals of six seconds per skier.

With the victory in the mass start in Otepää, Jarl Magnus Riiber became the first Nordic combined skier in history to win eight World Cup competitions in a row and extended his streak to ten victories.

== Map of world cup hosts ==
All 10 locations hosting world cup events for men (10), for women (8) and shared (8) in this season.

Europe

Ruka Tour (Men) Triple (Men) Men Only Shared

== Men ==
World Cup history in real time

Total	GUL	GUN	MSS	COL	CON	GU	Sp	Pen	Hsp	Csp	Winners
613	149	103	26	1	2	239	86	4	2	1	76

after GUN event in Trondheim (17 March 2024)

=== Calendar ===
GUN – Gundersen / COM – Compact / MSS – Mass Start
All	#	Date	Place (Hill)	Discipline	Winner	Second	Third	R.
593	1	24 November 2023	(Finland) Ruka (Rukatunturi HS142)	7,5 km COM _{001}	(Norway) Jens Lurås Oftebro	(Norway) Jarl Magnus Riiber	(Norway) Jørgen Graabak	
594	2	25 November 2023	(Finland) Ruka (Rukatunturi HS142)	10 km GUN _{144}	(Norway) Jarl Magnus Riiber	(Austria) Johannes Lamparter	(Norway) Jørgen Graabak	
595	3	26 November 2023	(Finland) Ruka (Rukatunturi HS142)	10 km MSS _{024}	(Norway) Jarl Magnus Riiber	(Austria) Johannes Lamparter	(Austria) Stefan Rettenegger	
6th Ruka Tour Overall (24–26 November 2023)					(Norway) Jarl Magnus Riiber	(Austria) Johannes Lamparter	(Norway) Jørgen Graabak	
596	4	2 December 2023	(Norway) Lillehammer (Lysgårdsbakken HS98/HS140)	10 km GUN _{095}	(Norway) Jarl Magnus Riiber	(Norway) Jens Lurås Oftebro	(Norway) Jørgen Graabak	
597	5	3 December 2023	(Norway) Lillehammer (Lysgårdsbakken HS98/HS140)	10 km GUN _{145}	(Norway) Jarl Magnus Riiber	(Austria) Johannes Lamparter	(Norway) Jørgen Graabak	
598	6	15 December 2023	(Austria) Ramsau (W90-Mattensprunganlage HS98)	10 km MSS _{025}	(Austria) Johannes Lamparter	(Norway) Jarl Magnus Riiber	(Germany) Manuel Faißt	
599	7	16 December 2023	(Austria) Ramsau (W90-Mattensprunganlage HS98)	7,5 km COM _{001}	(Austria) Johannes Lamparter	(Norway) Jarl Magnus Riiber	(Austria) Stefan Rettenegger	
600	8	13 January 2024	(Germany) Oberstdorf (Schattenbergschanze HS106)	10 km GUN _{096}	(Norway) Jarl Magnus Riiber	(Austria) Johannes Lamparter	(Austria) Stefan Rettenegger	
601	9	14 January 2024	(Germany) Oberstdorf (Schattenbergschanze HS106)	7,5 km COM _{002}	(Norway) Jarl Magnus Riiber	(Austria) Stefan Rettenegger	(Germany) Manuel Faißt	
602	10	27 January 2024	(Germany) Schonach (Langenwaldschanze HS100)	10 km GUN _{097}	(Norway) Jarl Magnus Riiber	(Austria) Stefan Rettenegger	(Norway) Jørgen Graabak	
603	11	28 January 2024	(Germany) Schonach (Langenwaldschanze HS100)	10 km GUN _{098}	(Norway) Jarl Magnus Riiber	(Norway) Jørgen Graabak	(Austria) Stefan Rettenegger	
2nd German Trophy Overall (13 – 28 January 2024)					(Norway) Jarl Magnus Riiber	(Austria) Stefan Rettenegger	(Norway) Jørgen Graabak	
604	12	2 February 2024	(Austria) Seefeld (Toni-Seelos-Olympiaschanze HS109)	7.5 km GUN _{099}	(Norway) Jarl Magnus Riiber	(Norway) Jørgen Graabak	(Austria) Johannes Lamparter	
605	13	3 February 2024	(Austria) Seefeld (Toni-Seelos-Olympiaschanze HS109)	10 km GUN _{100}	(Norway) Jarl Magnus Riiber	(Norway) Jørgen Graabak	(Norway) Jens Lurås Oftebro	
606	14	(Note: Ski Jumping competition round cancelled due to wind condition – PCR used as official jumping result.)4 February 2024	(Austria) Seefeld (Toni-Seelos-Olympiaschanze HS109)	12.5 km GUN _{101}	(Norway) Jarl Magnus Riiber	(Norway) Jørgen Graabak	(Austria) Stefan Rettenegger	
11th Nordic Combined Triple Overall (2 – 4 February 2024)
607	15	9 February 2024	(Estonia) Otepää (Tehvandi HS97)	10 km MSS _{026}	(Norway) Jarl Magnus Riiber	(Estonia) Kristjan Ilves	(Austria) Johannes Lamparter	
608	16	10 February 2024	(Estonia) Otepää (Tehvandi HS97)	10 km GUN _{102}	(Norway) Jarl Magnus Riiber	(Estonia) Kristjan Ilves	(Austria) Johannes Lamparter	
609	17	11 February 2024	(Estonia) Otepää (Tehvandi HS97)	10 km GUN _{103}	(Norway) Jarl Magnus Riiber	(Austria) Stefan Rettenegger	(Germany) David Mach	
610	18	3 March 2024	(Finland) Lahti (Salpausselkä HS130)	10 km GUN _{146}	(Austria) Johannes Lamparter	(Austria) Stefan Rettenegger	(Estonia) Kristjan Ilves	
611	19	9 March 2024	(Norway) Oslo (Holmenkollbakken HS134)	10 km GUN _{147}	(Norway) Jarl Magnus Riiber	(Austria) Johannes Lamparter	(Austria) Stefan Rettenegger	
612	20	10 March 2024	(Norway) Oslo (Holmenkollbakken HS134)	10 km GUN _{148}	(Norway) Jarl Magnus Riiber	(Austria) Johannes Lamparter	(Estonia) Kristjan Ilves	
613	21	17 March 2024	(Norway) Trondheim (Granåsen HS138)	10 km GUN _{149}	(Austria) Johannes Lamparter	(Austria) Stefan Rettenegger	(Estonia) Kristjan Ilves	
41st FIS World Cup Overall (24 November 2023 – 17 March 2024)					(Norway) Jarl Magnus Riiber	(Austria) Stefan Rettenegger	(Austria) Johannes Lamparter	

=== Men's team ===
World Cup history in real time

Total	Relay	Sprint	Mass Start	Winners
50	25	23	2	5

after Sprint in Lahti (2 March 2024)

All	#	Date	Place (Hill)	Discipline	Winner	Second	Third	R.
50	1	2 March 2024	(Finland) Lahti (Salpausselkä HS130)	2 x 7.5 km Sprint _{023}	Norway I: 1. Jens Lurås Oftebro; 2. Jørgen Graabak	Austria I: 1. Stefan Rettenegger; 2. Johannes Lamparter	Germany II: 1. Manuel Faißt; 2. Vinzenz Geiger	

=== Overall leaders ===
==== Individual ====
No.	Holder	Date gained	Place	Date forfeited	Place	Number of competitions
1.	(Norway) Jens Lurås Oftebro	24 November 2023	(Finland) Ruka	25 November 2023	(Finland) Ruka	1
2.	(Norway) Jarl Magnus Riiber	25 November 2023	(Finland) Ruka	Overall Winner		20

==== Nations Cup ====
No.	Holder	Date gained	Place	Date forfeited	Place	Number of competitions
1.	Norway	24 November 2023	(Finland) Ruka	13 January 2024	(Germany) Oberstdorf	7
2.	Austria	13 January 2024	(Germany) Oberstdorf	14 January 2024	(Germany) Oberstdorf	1
3.	Norway	14 January 2024	(Germany) Oberstdorf	9 March 2024	(Norway) Oslo	11
4.	Austria	9 March 2024	(Norway) Oslo	Overall Winner		4

=== Standings ===
==== Overall ====
Rank	after all 21 events	Points
	(Norway) Jarl Magnus Riiber	1870
2	(Austria) Stefan Rettenegger	1530
3	(Austria) Johannes Lamparter	1456
4	(Norway) Jørgen Graabak	1350
5	(Estonia) Kristjan Ilves	1207
6	(Norway) Jens Lurås Oftebro	1005
7	(Germany) Manuel Faißt	946
8	(Germany) Johannes Rydzek	932
9	(Austria) Thomas Rettenegger	877
10	(Finland) Eero Hirvonen	868

==== Nations Cup ====
Rank	after all 23 events	Points
	Austria	6545
2	Norway	6218
3	Germany	5630
4	Finland	2131
5	Japan	1327
6	Estonia	1207
7	Italy	1023
8	United States	978
9	France	940
10	Slovenia	207

==== Prize money ====
Rank	after all 28 payouts	CHF
1	(Norway) Jarl Magnus Riiber	199 160
2	(Austria) Johannes Lamparter	112 270
3	(Austria) Stefan Rettenegger	101 000
4	(Norway) Jørgen Graabak	88 240
5	(Estonia) Kristjan Ilves	51 970
6	(Norway) Jens Lurås Oftebro	48 990
7	(Germany) Manuel Faißt	28 710
8	(Germany) Vinzenz Geiger	26 990
9	(Germany) Johannes Rydzek	26 220
10	(Austria) Thomas Rettenegger	22 805

==== Best Jumper Trophy ====
Rank	after all 21 events	Points
	(Norway) Jarl Magnus Riiber	1830
2	(Austria) Johannes Lamparter	1546
3	(Austria) Thomas Rettenegger	1413
4	(Austria) Stefan Rettenegger	1348
5	(Austria) Franz-Josef Rehrl	1221
6	(Estonia) Kristjan Ilves	1200
7	(Norway) Jørgen Graabak	995
8	(Japan) Ryōta Yamamoto	969
9	(Germany) Terence Weber	939
10	(Austria) Martin Fritz	921

==== Best Skier Trophy ====
Rank	after all 21 events	Points
	(Germany) Vinzenz Geiger	1645
2	(Norway) Jens Lurås Oftebro	1310
3	(Finland) Eero Hirvonen	1191
4	(Finland) Ilkka Herola	1156
5	(Germany) Johannes Rydzek	1153
6	(Norway) Jørgen Graabak	1152
7	(Germany) Manuel Faißt	986
8	(Germany) Julian Schmid	946
9	(Norway) Jarl Magnus Riiber	854
10	(Austria) Stefan Rettenegger	854

==== Compact Trophy ====
Rank	after all 3 events	Points
1	(Norway) Jarl Magnus Riiber	280
2	(Austria) Stefan Rettenegger	219
3	(Germany) Johannes Rydzek	200
4	(Germany) Manuel Faißt	181
5	(Norway) Jens Lurås Oftebro	170
6	(Norway) Jørgen Graabak	166
7	(Austria) Johannes Lamparter	155
8	(Estonia) Kristjan Ilves	153
9	(Finland) Eero Hirvonen	138
10	(Germany) Terence Weber	124

==== Ruka Tour ====
Rank	after all 3 events	Points
1	(Norway) Jarl Magnus Riiber	290
2	(Austria) Johannes Lamparter	235
3	(Norway) Jørgen Graabak	220
4	(Austria) Stefan Rettenegger	199
5	(Estonia) Kristjan Ilves	171
6	(Norway) Jens Lurås Oftebro	157
7	(Germany) Julian Schmid	155
8	(Germany) Johannes Rydzek	147
9	(Germany) David Mach	130
10	(Germany) Terence Weber	124

==== German Trophy ====
Rank	after all 4 events	Time
1	(Norway) Jarl Magnus Riiber	1:30:27
2	(Austria) Stefan Rettenegger	+2:14
3	(Norway) Jørgen Graabak	+3:26
4	(Estonia) Kristjan Ilves	+3:44
5	(Germany) Manuel Faißt	+4:16
6	(Norway) Jens Lurås Oftebro	+4:18
7	(Germany) Vinzenz Geiger	+4:27
8	(Austria) Thomas Rettenegger	+4:29
9	(Austria) Lukas Greiderer	+4:59
10	(Austria) Martin Fritz	+5:05

== Women ==
World Cup history in real time

Total	Gundersen	MSS	CON	Winners
34	28	3	3	5

after GUN event in Trondheim (17 March 2024)

=== Calendar ===
GUN – Gundersen / COM – Compact / MSS – Mass Start
All	#	Date	Place (Hill)	Discipline	Winner	Second	Third	R.
20	1	1 December 2023	(Norway) Lillehammer (Lysgårdsbakken HS98)	5 km GUN _{018}	(Norway) Gyda Westvold Hansen	(Norway) Ida Marie Hagen	(Norway) Mari Leinan Lund	
21	2	2 December 2023	(Norway) Lillehammer (Lysgårdsbakken HS98)	5 km GUN _{019}	(Norway) Gyda Westvold Hansen	(Norway) Ida Marie Hagen	(Norway) Mari Leinan Lund	
22	3	15 December 2023	(Austria) Ramsau (W90-Mattensprunganlage HS98)	5 km GUN _{020}	(Norway) Gyda Westvold Hansen	(Norway) Ida Marie Hagen	(Finland) Minja Korhonen	
23	4	16 December 2023	(Austria) Ramsau (W90-Mattensprunganlage HS98)	5 km COM _{001}	(Norway) Ida Marie Hagen	(Norway) Gyda Westvold Hansen	(Austria) Lisa Hirner	
24	5	13 January 2024	(Germany) Oberstdorf (Schattenbergschanze HS106)	5 km GUN _{021}	(Norway) Mari Leinan Lund	(Norway) Ida Marie Hagen	(Norway) Gyda Westvold Hansen	
25	6	14 January 2024	(Germany) Oberstdorf (Schattenbergschanze HS106)	5 km COM _{002}	(Norway) Ida Marie Hagen	(Norway) Gyda Westvold Hansen	(Norway) Mari Leinan Lund	
26	7	27 January 2024	(Germany) Schonach (Langenwaldschanze HS100)	4 km GUN _{022}	(Norway) Mari Leinan Lund	(Norway) Ida Marie Hagen	(Germany) Nathalie Armbruster	
27	8	28 January 2024	(Germany) Schonach (Langenwaldschanze HS100)	8 km GUN _{023}	(Norway) Ida Marie Hagen	(Norway) Mari Leinan Lund	(Norway) Gyda Westvold Hansen	
1st German Trophy Overall (13 – 28 January 2024)					(Norway) Ida Marie Hagen	(Norway) Mari Leinan Lund	(Norway) Gyda Westvold Hansen	
28	9	2 February 2024	(Austria) Seefeld (Toni-Seelos-Olympiaschanze HS109)	5 km GUN _{024}	(Norway) Ida Marie Hagen	(Norway) Mari Leinan Lund	(Germany) Nathalie Armbruster	
29	10	3 February 2024	(Austria) Seefeld (Toni-Seelos-Olympiaschanze HS109)	5 km COM _{003}	(Norway) Ida Marie Hagen	(Norway) Gyda Westvold Hansen	(Germany) Nathalie Armbruster	
30	11	9 February 2024	(Estonia) Otepää (Tehvandi HS97)	5 km MSS _{003}	(Norway) Gyda Westvold Hansen	(Norway) Ida Marie Hagen	(Norway) Mari Leinan Lund	
31	12	10 February 2024	(Estonia) Otepää (Tehvandi HS97)	5 km GUN _{025}	(Norway) Ida Marie Hagen	(Japan) Haruka Kasai	(Norway) Gyda Westvold Hansen	
32	13	11 February 2024	(Estonia) Otepää (Tehvandi HS97)	5 km GUN _{026}	(Norway) Ida Marie Hagen	(Norway) Mari Leinan Lund	(Norway) Gyda Westvold Hansen	
33	14	(Note: 7 March Ski Jumping part, 9 March 5km race.)7+9 March 2024	(Norway) Oslo (Midtstubakken HS106)	5 km GUN _{027}	(Norway) Ida Marie Hagen	(Norway) Mari Leinan Lund	(Norway) Gyda Westvold Hansen	
34	15	17 March 2024	(Norway) Trondheim (Granåsen HS105)	7.5 km GUN _{028}	(Norway) Ida Marie Hagen	(Austria) Lisa Hirner	(Norway) Gyda Westvold Hansen	
4th Women's FIS World Cup Overall (1 December 2023 – 17 March 2024)					(Norway) Ida Marie Hagen	(Norway) Gyda Westvold Hansen	(Norway) Mari Leinan Lund	

=== Overall leaders ===
==== Individual ====
No.	Holder	Date gained	Place	Date forfeited	Place	Number of competitions
1.	(Norway) Gyda Westvold Hansen	1 December 2023	(Norway) Lillehammer	27 January 2024	(Germany) Schonach	6
2.	(Norway) Ida Marie Hagen	27 January 2024	(Germany) Schonach	Overall Winner		9

==== Nations Cup ====
No.	Holder	Date gained	Place	Date forfeited	Place	Number of competitions
1.	Norway	1 December 2023	(Norway) Lillehammer	Overall Winner		16

=== Standings ===
==== Overall ====
Rank	after all 15 events	Points
	(Norway) Ida Marie Hagen	1440
2	(Norway) Gyda Westvold Hansen	1280
3	(Norway) Mari Leinan Lund	1044
4	(Japan) Haruka Kasai	969
5	(Germany) Nathalie Armbruster	928
6	(Austria) Lisa Hirner	751
7	(Germany) Jenny Nowak	749
8	(France) Lena Brocard	653
9	(Japan) Yuna Kasai	603
10	(Germany) Maria Gerboth	587

==== Nations Cup ====
Rank	after all 16 events	Points
	Norway	4783
2	Germany	3292
3	Japan	2574
4	Austria	1672
5	Italy	1135
6	United States	810
7	France	690
8	Finland	656
9	Slovenia	482
10	Poland	330

==== Prize money ====
Rank	after all 20 payouts	CHF
1	(Norway) Ida Marie Hagen	79 050
2	(Norway) Gyda Westvold Hansen	49 450
3	(Norway) Mari Leinan Lund	36 000
4	(Japan) Haruka Kasai	17 150
5	(Germany) Nathalie Armbruster	16 500
6	(Austria) Lisa Hirner	15 550
7	(Germany) Jenny Nowak	10 950
8	(France) Lena Brocard	7 850
9	(Finland) Minja Korhonen	6 600
10	(Norway) Marte Leinan Lund	6 050

==== Best Jumper Trophy ====
Rank	after all 15 events	Points
	(Norway) Gyda Westvold Hansen	1344
2	(Norway) Mari Leinan Lund	1128
3	(Norway) Ida Marie Hagen	1099
4	(Japan) Haruka Kasai	994
5	(Germany) Svenja Würth	859
6	(Germany) Jenny Nowak	815
7	(Austria) Lisa Hirner	778
8	(Germany) Nathalie Armbruster	770
9	(France) Lena Brocard	699
10	(Germany) Maria Gerboth	670

==== Best Skier Trophy ====
Rank	after all 15 events	Points
	(Norway) Ida Marie Hagen	1490
2	(Germany) Nathalie Armbruster	1148
3	(Norway) Gyda Westvold Hansen	930
4	(Norway) Marte Leinan Lund	838
5	(Italy) Daniela Dejori	824
6	(Japan) Anju Nakamura	813
7	(Japan) Haruka Kasai	690
8	(Norway) Mari Leinan Lund	664
9	(Austria) Lisa Hirner	657
10	(Germany) Jenny Nowak	628

==== Compact Trophy ====
Rank	after all 3 events	Points
1	(Norway) Ida Marie Hagen	300
2	(Norway) Gyda Westvold Hansen	270
3	(Germany) Nathalie Armbruster	195
4	(Japan) Haruka Kasai	182
5	(Norway) Marte Leinan Lund	176
6	(Italy) Daniela Dejori	150
7	(Japan) Anju Nakamura	144
8	(Norway) Mari Leinan Lund	132
9	(Austria) Lisa Hirner	129
10	(Germany) Jenny Nowak	129

==== German Trophy ====
Rank	after all 4 events	Time
1	(Norway) Ida Marie Hagen	1:03:16
2	(Norway) Mari Leinan Lund	+0:53
3	(Norway) Gyda Westvold Hansen	+3:08
4	(Germany) Nathalie Armbruster	+4:58
5	(Japan) Haruka Kasai	+5:11
6	(France) Lena Brocard	+7:03
7	(Germany) Jenny Nowak	+7:58
8	(Norway) Marte Leinan Lund	+8:45
9	(Germany) Maria Gerboth	+9:14
10	(Japan) Yuna Kasai	+9:28

== Mixed team ==
World Cup history in real time

Total	Relay	Winners
3	3	1

after Relay event in Trondheim (16 March 2024)

All	#	Date	Place (Hill)	Discipline	Winner	Second	Third	R.
3	1	16 March 2024	(Norway) Trondheim (Granåsen HS105)	2 x 2.5 km + 2 x 5 km Relay _{003}	Norway: 1. Jens Lurås Oftebro; 2. Gyda Westvold Hansen; 3. Ida Marie Hagen; 4. Jørgen Graabak	Austria: 1. Stefan Rettenegger; 2. Lisa Hirner; 3. Annalena Slamik; 4. Johannes Lamparter	Germany: 1. Manuel Faißt; 2. Nathalie Armbruster; 3. Jenny Nowak; 4. Johannes Rydzek	

== Provisional competition rounds ==
=== Men ===
#	Place	Provisional round	Competition	Winner	R.
1	(Finland) Ruka	23 November	24, 25, 26 November	(Norway) Jarl Magnus Riiber	
2	(Norway) Lillehammer	1 December	2, 3 December	(Norway) Jarl Magnus Riiber	
3	(Austria) Ramsau	14 December	15, 16 December	(Austria) Stefan Rettenegger	
4	(Germany) Oberstdorf	12 January	13, 14 January	(Norway) Jarl Magnus Riiber	
	(Germany) Schonach	26 January	27, 28 January	cancelled due to strong wind	
5	(Austria) Seefeld	1 February	2, 3, 4 February	(Norway) Jarl Magnus Riiber	
6	(Estonia) Otepää	8 February	9, 10, 11 February	(Austria) Stefan Rettenegger	
7	(Finland) Lahti	1 March	2, 3 March	(Austria) Johannes Lamparter	
8	(Norway) Oslo	8 March	9, 10 March	(Austria) Thomas Rettenegger	
9	(Norway) Trondheim	15 March	17 March	(Austria) Stefan Rettenegger	

=== Women ===
#	Place	Provisional Round	Competition	Winner	R.
1	(Norway) Lillehammer	30 November	1, 2 December	(Norway) Gyda Westvold Hansen	
2	(Austria) Ramsau	14 December	15, 16 December	(Norway) Gyda Westvold Hansen	
3	(Germany) Oberstdorf	12 January	13, 14 January	(Norway) Mari Leinan Lund	
	(Germany) Schonach	26 January	27, 28 January	cancelled due to strong wind	
4	(Austria) Seefeld	1 February	2, 3 February	(Norway) Gyda Westvold Hansen	
5	(Estonia) Otepää	8 February	9, 10, 11 February	(Norway) Mari Leinan Lund	
6	(Norway) Trondheim	15 March	17 March	(Norway) Ida Marie Hagen	

== Podium table by nation ==
Table showing the World Cup podium places (gold–1st place, silver–2nd place, bronze–3rd place) by the countries represented by the athletes.

Rank	Nation	Gold	Silver	Bronze	Total
1	Norway	34	21	16	71
2	Austria	4	14	10	28
3	Estonia	0	2	3	5
4	Japan	0	1	0	1
5	Germany	0	0	8	8
6	Finland	0	0	1	1
Totals (6 entries)		38	38	38	114

== Points distribution ==
The table shows the number of points won in the 2023/24 FIS Nordic Combined World Cup for men and women.

Place	1	2	3	4	5	6	7	8	9	10	11	12	13	14	15	16	17	18	19	20	21	22	23	24	25	26	27	28	29	30	31	32	33	34	35	36	37	38	39	40
Individual	100	90	80	70	60	55	52	49	46	43	40	38	36	34	32	30	28	26	24	22	20	19	18	17	16	15	14	13	12	11	10	9	8	7	6	5	4	3	2	1
NC Triple – Days 1 & 2	50	45	40	35	30	28	26	24	23	22	20	19	18	17	16	15	14	13	12	11	10	9			8	7			6	5			4	3			2	1
NC Triple – Day 3	200	180	160	140	120	112	104	96	92	88	80	76	72	68	64	60	56	52	48	44	40	36			32	28			24	20			16	12			8	4
Relay Team	400	352	300	248	200	152	100	48
Team-Sprint/Mixed Team	200	176	150	124	100	76	50	24
Mixed Team-Sprint	100	88	75	62	50	38	25	12

== Achievements ==
First World Cup career victory

Men

Women

- (Norway) Ida Marie Hagen (23), in her 3rd season – the WC 4 in Ramsau
- (Norway) Mari Leinan Lund (24), in her 4th season – the WC 5 in Oberstdorf

First World Cup podium

Men

- (Austria) Stefan Rettenegger (21), in his 5th season – the WC 3 in Ruka – 3rd place
- (Germany) David Mach (23), in his 6th season – the WC 17 in Otepää – 3rd place

Women

- (Finland) Minja Korhonen (16), in her 2nd season – the WC 3 in Ramsau am Dachstein – 3rd place

Number of wins this season (in brackets are all-time wins)

Men

- (Norway) Jarl Magnus Riiber – 16 (73) (Note: Men's all-time record in World Cup history after this season)
- (Austria) Johannes Lamparter – 4 (14)
- (Norway) Jens Lurås Oftebro – 1 (5)

Women

- (Norway) Ida Marie Hagen – 9 (9)
- (Norway) Gyda Westvold Hansen – 4 (21) (Note: Women's all-time record in World Cup history after this season)
- (Norway) Mari Leinan Lund – 2 (2)

== Retirements ==
The following notable Nordic combined skiers, who competed in the World Cup, retired during or after the 2023–24 season:

Men

- (Italy) Samuel Costa
- (France) Antoine Gérard
- (Finland) Leevi Mutru
- (Czech Republic) Tomáš Portyk
- (Germany) Fabian Rießle

Women
