= 2021–22 FIS Nordic Combined World Cup =

International skiing competition

Nordic Combined World Cup 2021/22
Discipline	Men	Women
Overall	(Norway) Jarl Magnus Riiber (4)	(Norway) Gyda Westvold Hansen (1)
Nations Cup	Norway (19)	Norway (2)
Best Jumper Trophy	(Norway) Jarl Magnus Riiber (3)	(Norway) Gyda Westvold Hansen (2)
Best Skier Trophy	(Finland) Ilkka Herola (3)	(Japan) Anju Nakamura (1)

Stage events
Ruka Tour	(Norway) Jarl Magnus Riiber (3)	—
Triple	(Norway) Jørgen Graabak (1)	—

Competition
Edition	39th	2nd
Locations	10	5
Individual	20	8
Team	2	—
Mixed	1	1
Cancelled	2	1

The 2021/22 FIS Nordic Combined World Cup, organized by the International Ski Federation was the 39th Nordic Combined World Cup season for men, and the 2nd season for women. The men's competition started in Ruka, Finland, and the women's competition in Lillehammer, Norway. Both competitions concluded in Schonach, Germany.

Norwegian Jarl Magnus Riiber and American Tara Geraghty-Moats are the defending overall champions from the 2020–21 season. The American will not defend her title due to the change of sport from Nordic combined to biathlon.

As of this season, women's mass start and mixed competitions are making their debut.

On 1 March 2022, following the 2022 Russian invasion of Ukraine, FIS decided to exclude athletes from Russia and Belarus from FIS competitions, with an immediate effect.

With his victory in Schonach, Jarl Magnus Riiber took his 49th World Cup win, overtaking Hannu Manninen (48 wins) in the overall standings and now is the most successful Nordic combined skier in the history of the World Cup.

== Map of world cup hosts ==
All 11 locations hosting world cup events for men (11), for women (6) and shared (5) in this season.

Europe

Ruka Tour (Men) Triple (Men) Men Only Shared

== Men ==
World Cup history in real time

Total	GUL	GUN	MSS	GU	Sp	Pen	Hsp	Csp	Winners
570	133	85	20	239	86	4	2	1	75

after GUN event in Schonach (13 March 2022)

=== Calendar ===
Num	Season	Date	Place	Hill	Discipline	Winner	Second	Third	Yellow bib	Ref.
551	1	26 November 2021	(Finland) Ruka	Rukatunturi	HS142 / 5 km _{125}	(Norway) Jarl Magnus Riiber	(Austria) Johannes Lamparter	(Norway) Jens Lurås Oftebro	(Norway) Jarl Magnus Riiber	
552	2	27 November 2021	(Finland) Ruka	Rukatunturi	HS142 / 10 km _{126}	(Germany) Terence Weber	(Germany) Eric Frenzel	(Germany) Vinzenz Geiger	(Germany) Terence Weber	
553	3	(Note: Ski Jumping competition round cancelled due to wind condition – PCR used as official jumping result.)28 November 2021	(Finland) Ruka	Rukatunturi	HS142 / 10 km _{127}	(Norway) Jarl Magnus Riiber	(Austria) Johannes Lamparter	(Norway) Jens Lurås Oftebro	(Norway) Jarl Magnus Riiber	
4th Ruka Tour (25 – 28 November 2021)						(Norway) Jarl Magnus Riiber	(Austria) Johannes Lamparter	(Germany) Terence Weber		
554	4	5 December 2021	(Norway) Lillehammer	Lysgårdsbakken	HS140 / 10 km _{128}	(Norway) Jarl Magnus Riiber	(Austria) Johannes Lamparter	(Germany) Eric Frenzel	(Norway) Jarl Magnus Riiber	
555	5	(Note: Changed competition format from Gundersen Normal hill to Mass Start.)11 December 2021	(Estonia) Otepää	Tehvandi	10 km / HS97 _{020}	(Norway) Jarl Magnus Riiber	(Norway) Espen Bjørnstad	(Germany) Manuel Faißt	(Norway) Jarl Magnus Riiber	
556	6	12 December 2021	(Estonia) Otepää	Tehvandi	HS97 / 10 km _{076}	(Norway) Jarl Magnus Riiber	(Germany) Fabian Rießle	(Germany) Julian Schmid	(Norway) Jarl Magnus Riiber	
557	7	18 December 2021	(Austria) Ramsau	W90-Mattensprunganlage	HS98 / 10 km _{077}	(Norway) Jarl Magnus Riiber	(Germany) Vinzenz Geiger	(Finland) Ilkka Herola	(Norway) Jarl Magnus Riiber	
558	8	19 December 2021	(Austria) Ramsau	W90-Mattensprunganlage	HS98 / 10 km _{078}	(Norway) Jarl Magnus Riiber	(Germany) Vinzenz Geiger	(Germany) Eric Frenzel	(Norway) Jarl Magnus Riiber	
559	9	8 January 2022	(Italy) Val di Fiemme	Trampolino dal Ben	HS106 / 10 km _{079}	(Austria) Johannes Lamparter	(Germany) Vinzenz Geiger	(Germany) Eric Frenzel	(Norway) Jarl Magnus Riiber	
560	10	9 January 2022	(Italy) Val di Fiemme	Trampolino dal Ben	HS106 / 10 km _{080}	(Germany) Vinzenz Geiger	(Austria) Johannes Lamparter	(Germany) Johannes Rydzek	(Norway) Jarl Magnus Riiber	
561	11	15 January 2022	(Germany) Klingenthal	Vogtland Arena	HS140 / 10 km _{129}	(Austria) Johannes Lamparter	(Estonia) Kristjan Ilves	(Japan) Ryōta Yamamoto	(Norway) Jarl Magnus Riiber	
562	12	16 January 2022	(Germany) Klingenthal	Vogtland Arena	HS140 / 10 km _{130}	(Austria) Johannes Lamparter	(Estonia) Kristjan Ilves	(Austria) Franz-Josef Rehrl	(Austria) Johannes Lamparter	
		22 January 2022	(Slovenia) Planica	Bloudkova velikanka	HS104 / 10 km	Cancelled due to the COVID-19 pandemic.				
		23 January 2022	(Slovenia) Planica	Bloudkova velikanka	HS104 / 10 km	Cancelled due to the COVID-19 pandemic.				
563	13	28 January 2022	(Austria) Seefeld	Toni-Seelos-Olympiaschanze	HS109 / 7.5 km _{081}	(Norway) Jarl Magnus Riiber	(Germany) Vinzenz Geiger	(Austria) Johannes Lamparter	(Austria) Johannes Lamparter	
564	14	29 January 2022	(Austria) Seefeld	Toni-Seelos-Olympiaschanze	HS109 / 10 km _{082}	(Germany) Vinzenz Geiger	(Austria) Johannes Lamparter	(Norway) Jørgen Graabak	(Austria) Johannes Lamparter	
565	15	(Note: Ski Jumping competition round cancelled due to wind condition – PCR with time bonuses from previous race used as official jumping result.)30 January 2022	(Austria) Seefeld	Toni-Seelos-Olympiaschanze	HS109 / 12.5 km _{083}	(Norway) Jørgen Graabak	(Austria) Johannes Lamparter	(Norway) Jarl Magnus Riiber	(Austria) Johannes Lamparter	
9th Nordic Combined Triple (28 – 30 January 2022)
2022 Winter Olympics (9 – 15 February)
566	16	27 February 2022	(Finland) Lahti	Salpausselkä	HS130 / 10 km _{131}	(Norway) Jarl Magnus Riiber	(Germany) Vinzenz Geiger	(Austria) Johannes Lamparter	(Austria) Johannes Lamparter	
567	17	5 March 2022	(Norway) Oslo	Holmenkollbakken	HS134 / 10 km _{132}	(Norway) Jarl Magnus Riiber	(Austria) Johannes Lamparter	(Norway) Jens Lurås Oftebro	(Austria) Johannes Lamparter	
568	18	6 March 2022	(Norway) Oslo	Holmenkollbakken	HS134 / 10 km _{133}	(Norway) Jarl Magnus Riiber	(Austria) Mario Seidl	(Norway) Jens Lurås Oftebro	(Austria) Johannes Lamparter	
569	19	12 March 2022	(Germany) Schonach	Langenwaldschanze	HS100 / 10 km _{084}	(Norway) Jarl Magnus Riiber	(Austria) Johannes Lamparter	(Norway) Jørgen Graabak	(Norway) Jarl Magnus Riiber	
570	20	13 March 2022	(Germany) Schonach	Langenwaldschanze	HS100 / 10 km _{085}	(Norway) Jarl Magnus Riiber	(Austria) Johannes Lamparter	(Germany) Vinzenz Geiger	(Norway) Jarl Magnus Riiber	

=== Men's team ===
World Cup history in real time

Total	Relay	Sprint	Mass Start	Winners
48	25	21	2	5

after Sprint in Lahti (26 February 2022)

Num	Season	Date	Place	Hill	Discipline	Winner	Second	Third	Yellow bib	Ref.
47	1	4 December 2021	(Norway) Lillehammer	Lysgårdsbakken	HS98 / 4x5 km Relay _{025}	Norway Espen Bjørnstad; Jens Lurås Oftebro; Jørgen Graabak; Jarl Magnus Riiber	Germany Eric Frenzel; Manuel Faißt; Terence Weber; Vinzenz Geiger	Japan Sora Yachi; Ryōta Yamamoto; Yoshito Watabe; Akito Watabe	Germany	
2022 Winter Olympics (17 February)
48	2	26 February 2022	(Finland) Lahti	Salpausselkä	HS130 / 2x7.5 km Sprint _{021}	Norway I Jens Lurås Oftebro; Jørgen Graabak	Austria I Franz-Josef Rehrl; Lukas Greiderer	Norway II Espen Bjørnstad; Espen Andersen	Germany	

=== Standings ===
==== Overall ====
Rank	after all 20 events	Points
	(Norway) Jarl Magnus Riiber	1383
2	(Austria) Johannes Lamparter	1362
3	(Germany) Vinzenz Geiger	979
4	(Norway) Jørgen Graabak	783
5	(Estonia) Kristjan Ilves	627
6	(Norway) Jens Lurås Oftebro	618
7	(Germany) Eric Frenzel	592
8	(Germany) Terence Weber	542
9	(Finland) Ilkka Herola	530
10	(Austria) Mario Seidl	529

==== Nations Cup ====
Rank	after all 23 events	Points
	Norway	4691
2	Germany	4367
3	Austria	3874
4	Japan	2018
5	Finland	855
6	Estonia	627
7	France	551
8	United States	389
9	Italy	283
10	Czech Republic	182

==== Best Jumper Trophy ====
Rank	after all 20 events	Points
Blue bib	(Norway) Jarl Magnus Riiber	1316
2	(Estonia) Kristjan Ilves	1003
3	(Austria) Johannes Lamparter	970
4	(Austria) Mario Seidl	933
5	(Japan) Ryōta Yamamoto	751
6	(Germany) Terence Weber	733
7	(Japan) Yoshito Watabe	631
8	(Austria) Franz-Josef Rehrl	563
9	(Germany) Julian Schmid	502
10	(Germany) Eric Frenzel	495

==== Best Skier Trophy ====
Rank	after all 20 events	Points
Red bib	(Finland) Ilkka Herola	1177
2	(Norway) Jørgen Graabak	1061
3	(Germany) Vinzenz Geiger	992
4	(Germany) Johannes Rydzek	936
5	(Austria) Johannes Lamparter	916
6	(Japan) Akito Watabe	646
7	(Germany) Fabian Rießle	582
8	(Norway) Jens Lurås Oftebro	556
9	(Germany) Eric Frenzel	528
10	(Germany) Julian Schmid	507

==== Prize money ====
Rank	after all 27 payouts	CHF
1	(Norway) Jarl Magnus Riiber	138 040
2	(Austria) Johannes Lamparter	105 160
3	(Germany) Vinzenz Geiger	68 637
4	(Norway) Jørgen Graabak	57 075
5	(Norway) Jens Lurås Oftebro	45 485
6	(Germany) Terence Weber	30 800
7	(Germany) Eric Frenzel	30 261
8	(Estonia) Kristjan Ilves	29 690
9	(Finland) Ilkka Herola	28 275
10	(Austria) Mario Seidl	20 378

== Women ==
World Cup history in real time

Total	Gundersen	MSS	Winners
9	7	2	3

after GUL event in Schonach (13 January 2022)

=== Calendar ===
GUN – Gundersen / COM – Compact / MSS – Mass Start
All	#	Date	Place (Hill)	Discipline	Winner	Second	Third	R.
2	1	3 December 2021	(Norway) Lillehammer (Lysgårdsbakken HS98)	5 km GUN _{002}	(Norway) Gyda Westvold Hansen	(Norway) Mari Leinan Lund	(Italy) Annika Sieff	
3	2	4 December 2021	(Norway) Lillehammer (Lysgårdsbakken HS98)	5 km GUN _{003}	(Norway) Gyda Westvold Hansen	(Norway) Mari Leinan Lund	(Austria) Lisa Hirner	
4	3	11 December 2021	(Estonia) Otepää (Tehvandi HS97)	5 km MSS _{001}	(Norway) Gyda Westvold Hansen	(Norway) Ida Marie Hagen	(Japan) Yuna Kasai	
5	4	12 December 2021	(Estonia) Otepää (Tehvandi HS97)	5 km GUN _{004}	(Norway) Gyda Westvold Hansen	(Norway) Ida Marie Hagen	(Norway) Marte Leinan Lund	
6	5	17 December 2021	(Austria) Ramsau (W90-Mattensprunganlage HS98)	5 km GUN _{005}	(Norway) Gyda Westvold Hansen	(Slovenia) Ema Volavšek	(Japan) Yuna Kasai	
7	6	8 January 2022	(Italy) Val di Fiemme (Trampolino dal Ben HS106)	5 km MSS _{002}	(Norway) Gyda Westvold Hansen	(Japan) Anju Nakamura	(Austria) Lisa Hirner	
		23 January 2022	(Slovenia) Planica (Bloudkova velikanka HS102)	5 km GUN _{cnx}	Cancelled due to the COVID-19 pandemic.			
8	7	12 March 2022	(Germany) Schonach (Langenwaldschanze HS100)	5 km GUN _{006}	(Japan) Anju Nakamura	(Japan) Haruka Kasai	(Italy) Annika Sieff	
9	8	13 March 2022	(Germany) Schonach (Langenwaldschanze HS100)	5 km GUN _{007}	(Norway) Gyda Westvold Hansen	(Japan) Haruka Kasai	(Slovenia) Ema Volavšek	

=== Overall leaders ===
==== Individual ====
No.	Holder	Date gained	Place	Date forfeited	Place	Number of competitions
1.	(Norway) Gyda Westvold Hansen	3 December 2021	(Norway) Lillehammer	Overall Winner		8

=== Standings ===
==== Overall ====
Rank	after all 8 events	Points
	(Norway) Gyda Westvold Hansen	700
2	(Norway) Ida Marie Hagen	411
3	(Slovenia) Ema Volavšek	387
4	(Japan) Anju Nakamura	364
5	(Italy) Annika Sieff	338
6	(Norway) Marte Leinan Lund	290
7	(Austria) Lisa Hirner	286
8	(Japan) Yuna Kasai	258
9	(Germany) Jenny Nowak	227
10	(Norway) Mari Leinan Lund	205

==== Nations Cup ====
Rank	after all 9 events	Points
	Norway	1887
2	Japan	1008
3	Germany	899
4	Italy	700
5	Slovenia	575
6	Austria	540
7	Russia	349
8	United States	208
9	France	162
10	Czech Republic	59

==== Best Jumper Trophy ====
Rank	after all 8 events	Points
Blue bib	(Norway) Gyda Westvold Hansen	700
2	(Italy) Annika Sieff	436
3	(Slovenia) Ema Volavšek	356
4	(Norway) Ida Marie Hagen	355
5	(Japan) Yuna Kasai	301
6	(Norway) Mari Leinan Lund	300
7	(Slovenia) Silva Verbič	278
8	(Austria) Lisa Hirner	264
9	(Norway) Marte Leinan Lund	252
10	(Germany) Jenny Nowak	221

==== Best Skier Trophy ====
Rank	after all 8 events	Points
Red bib	(Japan) Anju Nakamura	641
2	(Norway) Ida Marie Hagen	489
3	(Norway) Gyda Westvold Hansen	457
4	(Germany) Cindy Haasch	410
5	(Norway) Marte Leinan Lund	365
6	(Slovenia) Ema Volavšek	311
7	(Austria) Lisa Hirner	242
8	(Russia) Anastasia Goncharova	204
9	(Germany) Jenny Nowak	176
10	(Italy) Annika Sieff	172

==== Prize money ====
Rank	after all 12 payouts	CHF
1	(Norway) Gyda Westvold Hansen	36 000
2	(Norway) Ida Marie Hagen	10 450
3	(Japan) Anju Nakamura	9 900
4	(Norway) Mari Leinan Lund	9 600
5	(Slovenia) Ema Volavšek	8 200
6	(Austria) Lisa Hirner	6 750
7	(Japan) Haruka Kasai	5 000
8	(Italy) Annika Sieff	4 900
9	(Norway) Marte Leinan Lund	4 500
10	(Japan) Yuna Kasai	3 950

== Mixed team ==
World Cup history in real time

Total	Relay	Winners
1	1	1

Num	Season	Date	Place	Hill	Discipline	Winner	Second	Third	Yellow bib	Ref.
1	1	7 January 2022	(Italy) Val di Fiemme	Trampolino dal Ben	HS106/ 2x2.5 km + 2x5 km Relay _{001}	Norway Jens Lurås Oftebro; Mari Leinan Lund; Gyda Westvold Hansen; Jørgen Graabak	Austria Martin Fritz; Lisa Hirner; Annalena Slamik; Lukas Greiderer	Germany Jakob Lange; Cindy Haasch; Jenny Nowak; Terence Weber	Norway (men) & (women)	

== Provisional Competition Rounds (PCR) ==
=== Men ===
No.	Place	Provisional Round	Competition	Size	Winner	Ref.
1	(Finland) Ruka	25 November 2021	26, 27, 28 November 2021	LH	(Austria) Johannes Lamparter	
2	(Norway) Lillehammer	3 December 2021	5 December 2021	LH	(Germany) Terence Weber	
3	(Estonia) Otepää	10 December 2021	11, 12 December 2021	NH	cancelled due to strong wind	
4	(Austria) Ramsau	17 December 2021	18, 19 December 2021	NH	(Germany) Terence Weber	
5	(Italy) Val di Fiemme	6 January 2022	8, 9 January 2022	NH	(Austria) Franz-Josef Rehrl	
6	(Germany) Klingenthal	14 January 2022	15, 16 January 2022	LH	(Norway) Simen Tiller	
	(Slovenia) Planica	21 January 2022	22, 23 January 2022	NH	cancelled due to the COVID-19 pandemic.	
7	(Austria) Seefeld	27 January 2022	28 January 2022	NH	(Norway) Jarl Magnus Riiber	
8	(Austria) Seefeld	29 January 2022	29, 30 January 2022	NH	(Estonia) Kristjan Ilves	
9	(Finland) Lahti	25 February 2022	27 February 2022	LH	(Austria) Franz-Josef Rehrl	
10	(Norway) Oslo	4 March 2022	5, 6 March 2022	LH	(Norway) Jarl Magnus Riiber	
11	(Germany) Schonach	11 March 2022	12, 13 March 2022	NH	(Norway) Jarl Magnus Riiber	

=== Women ===
No.	Place	Provisional Round	Competition	Size	Winner	Ref.
1	(Norway) Lillehammer	2 December 2021	3, 4 December 2021	NH	(Italy) Annika Sieff	
2	(Estonia) Otepää	10 December 2021	11, 12 December 2021	NH	cancelled due to strong wind	
3	(Austria) Ramsau	16 December 2021	17 December 2021	NH	(Norway) Gyda Westvold Hansen	
4	(Italy) Val di Fiemme	6 January 2022	8 January 2022	NH	(Austria) Annalena Slamik	
	(Slovenia) Planica	22 January 2022	23 January 2022	NH	cancelled due to the COVID-19 pandemic.	
5	(Germany) Schonach	11 March 2022	12, 13 March 2022	NH	(Norway) Gyda Westvold Hansen	

== Points distribution ==
The table shows the number of points won in the 2021/22 FIS Nordic Combined World Cup for men and women.

Place	1	2	3	4	5	6	7	8	9	10	11	12	13	14	15	16	17	18	19	20	21	22	23	24	25	26	27	28	29	30
Individual	100	80	60	50	45	40	36	32	29	26	24	22	20	18	16	15	14	13	12	11	10	9	8	7	6	5	4	3	2	1
Nordic Combined Triple – Days 1 & 2	50	40	30	25	23	20	18	16	15	13	12	11	10	9	8	8	7	7	6	6	5	5	4	4	3	3	2	2	1	1
Nordic Combined Triple – Day 3	200	160	120	100	90	80	72	64	58	52	48	44	40	36	32	30	29	26	24	22	20	18	16	14	12	10	8	6	4	2
Relay	400	350	300	250	200	150	100	50
Mixed Team, Team Sprint	200	175	150	125	100	75	50	25

== Podium table by nation ==
Table showing the World Cup podium places (gold–1st place, silver–2nd place, bronze–3rd place) by the countries represented by the athletes.

Rank	Nation	Gold	Silver	Bronze	Total
1	Norway	24	5	9	38
2	Austria	3	12	5	20
3	Germany	3	8	9	20
4	Japan	1	3	4	8
5	Estonia	0	2	0	2
6	Slovenia	0	1	1	2
7	Italy	0	0	2	2
8	Finland	0	0	1	1
Totals (8 entries)		31	31	31	93

== Achievements ==
First World Cup career victory

Men

- (Germany) Terence Weber (25), in his 7th season – the WC 2 in Ruka
- (Austria) Johannes Lamparter (20), in his 4th season – the WC 9 in Val di Fiemme

Women

- (Norway) Gyda Westvold Hansen (19), in her 2nd season – the WC 1 in Lillehammer
- (Japan) Anju Nakamura (22), in her 2nd season – the WC 7 in Schonach

First World Cup podium

Men

- (Germany) Terence Weber (25), in his 7th season – the WC 2 in Ruka – 1st place
- (Germany) Julian Schmid (22), in his 4th season – the WC 6 in Otepää – 3rd place

Women

- (Norway) Mari Leinan Lund (22), in her 2nd season – the WC 1 in Lillehammer – 2nd place
- (Norway) Ida Marie Hagen (21), in her 1st season – the WC 3 in Otepää – 2nd place
- (Slovenia) Ema Volavšek (19), in her 2nd season – the WC 5 in Ramsau – 2nd place
- (Japan) Haruka Kasai (18), in her 1st season – the WC 7 in Schonach – 2nd place
- (Italy) Annika Sieff (18), in her 2nd season – the WC 1 in Lillehammer – 3rd place
- (Austria) Lisa Hirner (18), in her 2nd season – the WC 2 in Lillehammer – 3rd place
- (Japan) Yuna Kasai (17), in her 2nd season – the WC 3 in Otepää – 3rd place
- (Norway) Marte Leinan Lund (20), in her 2nd season – the WC 4 in Otepää – 3rd place

Number of wins this season (in brackets are all-time wins)

Men

- (Norway) Jarl Magnus Riiber – 13 (49)
- (Austria) Johannes Lamparter – 3 (3)
- (Germany) Vinzenz Geiger – 2 (9)
- (Norway) Jørgen Graabak – 1 (7)
- (Germany) Terence Weber – 1 (1)

Women

- (Norway) Gyda Westvold Hansen – 7 (7)
- (Japan) Anju Nakamura – 1 (1)

== Retirements ==
Following are notable Nordic combined skiers who announced their retirement:

Men

- (United States) Taylor Fletcher
- (Austria) Thomas Joebstl
- (Austria) Lukas Klapfer
- (Poland) Szczepan Kupczak
- (Japan) Hideaki Nagai

Women
