= Jarl Magnus Riiber =

Norwegian Nordic combined skier

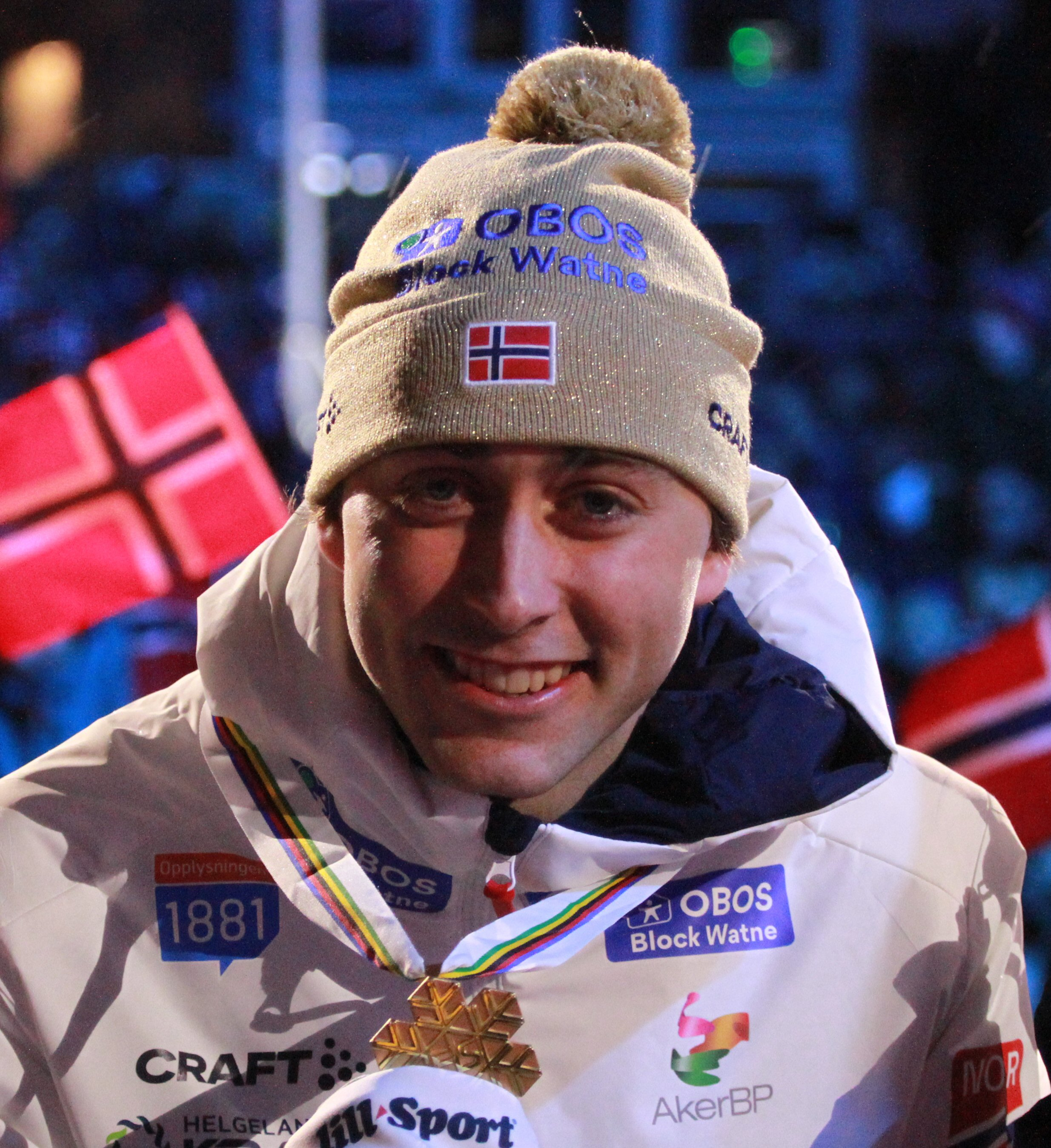
- Trondheim 2025 NC compact men podium

Personal information
- Nationality: Norway
- Born: 15 October 1997 (age 28) Oslo, Norway
- Height: 1.77 m (5 ft 10 in)

Sport
- Sport: Skiing
- Club: IL Heming

World Cup career
- Seasons: 2015–2025
- Indiv. starts: 147
- Indiv. podiums: 111
- Indiv. wins: 78
- Overall titles: 5 (2019, 2020, 2021, 2022, 2024)
- Discipline titles: 7 (5 BJT: 2020, 2021, 2022, 2024, 2025, 1 Com: 2024, 1 MST: 2025)
Medal record
Men's Nordic combined
Representing Norway
Olympic Games
Silver medal – second place	2018 Pyeongchang	Team LH
World Championships
Gold medal – first place	2019 Seefeld	Individual NH
Gold medal – first place	2019 Seefeld	Team NH
Gold medal – first place	2021 Oberstdorf	Individual NH
Gold medal – first place	2021 Oberstdorf	Team NH
Gold medal – first place	2023 Planica	Individual NH
Gold medal – first place	2023 Planica	Individual LH
Gold medal – first place	2023 Planica	Team LH
Gold medal – first place	2023 Planica	Mixed team NH
Gold medal – first place	2025 Trondheim	Individual NH
Gold medal – first place	2025 Trondheim	Individual LH
Gold medal – first place	2025 Trondheim	Mixed team NH
Silver medal – second place	2019 Seefeld	Team sprint LH
Silver medal – second place	2021 Oberstdorf	Individual LH
Silver medal – second place	2021 Oberstdorf	Team sprint LH
Bronze medal – third place	2025 Trondheim	Team LH
World Junior Championships
Gold medal – first place	2015 Almaty	Individual NH
Gold medal – first place	2015 Almaty	Individual NH
Bronze medal – third place	2014 Val di Fiemme	Team NH
Bronze medal – third place	2015 Almaty	Team NH
- Updated on 16 March 2025

Jarl Magnus Riiber (born 15 October 1997) is a Norwegian former Nordic combined skier who won the FIS Nordic Combined World Cup five times and 11 gold medals at the FIS Nordic World Ski Championships. With 78 World Cup victories, he is the most successful combined skier to date in terms of wins.

== Career ==
Riiber attained his first World Cup podium during the 2014–15 season on 16 January 2015 in Seefeld in Austria.

During the 2015–16, he won his first race on 6 February 2016 in Oslo, Norway.

Riiber has the record of the most Crystal Globes in Nordic Combined World Cup with five (equal with Eric Frenzel). He has the all-time most individual World Cup race wins at 78 and podiums at 111.

At the end of the 2024/25 season, Riiber retired from competitions.

== Nordic combined results ==
=== Olympic Games ===
- 1 medal – (1 silver)

Year	Individual NH	Individual LH	Team LH
2018	4	4	Silver
2022	—	8	—

=== World Championships ===
- 15 medals – (11 gold, 3 silver, 1 bronze)

Year	Individual NH	Individual LH	Team NH/LH	Team Sprint LH	Mixed Team NH
2019	Gold	5	Gold	Silver	—N/a
2021	Gold	Silver	Gold	Silver	—N/a
2023	Gold	Gold	Gold	—N/a	Gold
2025	Gold	Gold	Bronze	—N/a	Gold

=== World Cup ===
==== Season titles ====
- 12 titles – (5 Overall, 5 BJT, 1 Com, 1 MST)

Season	Discipline
2019	Overall
2020	Overall
2020	Best Jumper Trophy
2021	Overall
2021	Best Jumper Trophy
2022	Overall
2022	Best Jumper Trophy
2024	Overall
2024	Best Jumper Trophy
2024	Compact Trophy
2025	Best Jumper Trophy
2025	Mass Start Trophy

==== Season standings ====
Season	Age	Overall	Best Jumper Trophy	Best Skier Trophy	Compact Trophy	Mass Start Trophy
2015	17	35	—N/a	—N/a	—N/a	—N/a
2016	18	13	—N/a	—N/a	—N/a	—N/a
2017	19	39	—N/a	—N/a	—N/a	—N/a
2018	20	7	2nd place, silver medalist(s)	41	—N/a	—N/a
2019	21	1st place, gold medalist(s)	2nd place, silver medalist(s)	12	—N/a	—N/a
2020	22	1st place, gold medalist(s)	1st place, gold medalist(s)	14	—N/a	—N/a
2021	23	1st place, gold medalist(s)	1st place, gold medalist(s)	13	—N/a	—N/a
2022	24	1st place, gold medalist(s)	1st place, gold medalist(s)	14	—N/a	—N/a
2023	25	4	3rd place, bronze medalist(s)	15	—N/a	—N/a
2024	26	1st place, gold medalist(s)	1st place, gold medalist(s)	9	1st place, gold medalist(s)	—N/a
2025	27	2nd place, silver medalist(s)	1st place, gold medalist(s)	12	2nd place, silver medalist(s)	1st place, gold medalist(s)

==== Individual podiums ====
- 78 wins
- 111 podiums

No.	Season	Date	Location	Discipline	Place
1	2014–15	16 January 2015	(Austria) Seefeld	HS109/5 km	3rd (1)
2	2015–16	19 December 2015	(Austria) Ramsau	HS98/10 km	3rd (2)
3	2015–16	20 December 2015	(Austria) Ramsau	HS98/10 km	2nd (1)
4	2015–16	6 February 2016	(Norway) Oslo	HS134/10 km	1st (1)
5	2015–16	9 February 2016	(Norway) Trondheim	HS140/10 km	3rd (3)
6	2017–18	26 January 2018	(Austria) Seefeld	HS109/5 km	2nd (2)
7	2017–18	27 January 2018	(Austria) Seefeld	HS109/10 km	3rd (4)
8	2017–18	28 January 2018	(Austria) Seefeld	HS109/15 km	2nd (3)
9	2017–18	14 March 2018	(Norway) Trondheim	HS140/10 km	2nd (4)
10	2017–18	24 March 2018	(Germany) Schonach	HS106/10 km	2nd (5)
11	2017–18	25 March 2018	(Germany) Schonach	HS106/15 km	2nd (6)
12	2018–19	24 November 2018	(Finland) Ruka	HS142/10 km	2nd (7)
13	2018–19	30 November 2018	(Norway) Lillehammer	HS98/5 km	1st (2)
14	2018–19	1 December 2018	(Norway) Lillehammer	10 km/HS98	1st (3)
15	2018–19	2 December 2018	(Norway) Lillehammer	HS140/10 km	1st (4)
16	2018–19	22 December 2018	(Austria) Ramsau	HS98/10 km	1st (5)
17	2018–19	5 January 2019	(Estonia) Otepää	HS97/10 km	1st (6)
18	2018–19	6 January 2019	(Estonia) Otepää	HS97/10 km	1st (7)
19	2018–19	26 January 2019	(Norway) Trondheim	HS138/10 km	1st (8)
20	2018–19	27 January 2019	(Norway) Trondheim	HS138/10 km	1st (9)
21	2018–19	2 February 2019	(Germany) Klingenthal	HS140/10 km	1st (10)
22	2018–19	3 February 2019	(Germany) Klingenthal	HS140/10 km	1st (11)
23	2018–19	9 March 2019	(Norway) Oslo	HS134/10 km	1st (12)
24	2018–19	16 March 2019	(Germany) Schonach	HS106/10 km	3rd (5)
25	2018–19	17 March 2019	(Germany) Schonach	HS106/10 km	1st (13)
26	2019–20	29 November 2019	(Finland) Ruka	HS142/5 km	1st (14)
27	2019–20	30 November 2019	(Finland) Ruka	HS142/10 km	1st (15)
28	2019–20	1 December 2019	(Finland) Ruka	HS142/10 km	1st (16)
29	2019–20	7 December 2019	(Norway) Lillehammer	HS140/10 km	1st (17)
30	2019–20	8 December 2019	(Norway) Lillehammer	HS140/10 km	1st (18)
31	2019–20	21 December 2019	(Austria) Ramsau	HS98/10 km	2nd (8)
32	2019–20	22 December 2019	(Austria) Ramsau	HS98/10 km	1st (19)
33	2019–20	10 January 2020	(Italy) Val di Fiemme	HS104/10 km	1st (20)
34	2019–20	11 January 2020	(Italy) Val di Fiemme	HS104/10 km	2nd (9)
35	2019–20	26 January 2020	(Germany) Oberstdorf	HS137/10 km	1st (21)
36	2019–20	31 January 2020	(Austria) Seefeld	HS109/5 km	1st (22)
37	2019–20	1 February 2020	(Austria) Seefeld	HS109/10 km	1st (23)
38	2019–20	2 February 2020	(Austria) Seefeld	HS109/15 km	1st (24)
39	2019–20	22 February 2020	(Norway) Trondheim	HS138/10 km	1st (25)
40	2019–20	23 February 2020	(Norway) Trondheim	HS138/10 km	1st (26)
41	2019–20	7 March 2020	(Norway) Oslo	HS134/10 km	1st (27)
42	2020–21	27 November 2020	(Finland) Ruka	HS142/5 km	1st (28)
43	2020–21	28 November 2020	(Finland) Ruka	HS142/10 km	1st (29)
44	2020–21	19 December 2020	(Austria) Ramsau	HS98/10 km	2nd (10)
45	2020–21	20 December 2020	(Austria) Ramsau	HS98/10 km	2nd (11)
46	2020–21	15 January 2021	(Italy) Val di Fiemme	HS104/10 km	1st (30)
47	2020–21	17 January 2021	(Italy) Val di Fiemme	HS104/10 km	1st (31)
48	2020–21	24 January 2021	(Finland) Lahti	HS130/10 km	2nd (12)
49	2020–21	29 January 2021	(Austria) Seefeld	HS109/5 km	1st (32)
50	2020–21	30 January 2021	(Austria) Seefeld	HS109/10 km	1st (33)
51	2020–21	31 January 2021	(Austria) Seefeld	HS109/15 km	1st (34)
52	2020–21	20 March 2021	(Germany) Klingenthal	HS140/10 km	1st (35)
53	2020–21	21 March 2021	(Germany) Klingenthal	HS140/10 km	1st (36)
54	2021–22	26 November 2021	(Finland) Ruka	HS142/5 km	1st (37)
55	2021–22	28 November 2021	(Finland) Ruka	HS142/10 km	1st (38)
56	2021–22	5 December 2021	(Norway) Lillehammer	HS140/10 km	1st (39)
57	2021–22	11 December 2021	(Estonia) Otepää	10 km/HS97	1st (40)
58	2021–22	12 December 2021	(Estonia) Otepää	HS97/10 km	1st (41)
59	2021–22	18 December 2021	(Austria) Ramsau	HS98/10 km	1st (42)
60	2021–22	19 December 2021	(Austria) Ramsau	HS98/10 km	1st (43)
61	2021–22	28 January 2022	(Austria) Seefeld	HS109/7.5 km	1st (44)
62	2021–22	30 January 2022	(Austria) Seefeld	HS109/12.5 km	3rd (6)
63	2021–22	27 February 2022	(Finland) Lahti	HS130/10 km	1st (45)
64	2021–22	5 March 2022	(Norway) Oslo	HS134/10 km	1st (46)
65	2021–22	6 March 2022	(Norway) Oslo	HS134/10 km	1st (47)
66	2021–22	12 March 2022	(Germany) Schonach	HS106/10 km	1st (48)
67	2021–22	13 March 2022	(Germany) Schonach	HS106/10 km	1st (49)
68	2022–23	26 November 2022	(Finland) Ruka	HS142/10 km	1st (50)
69	2022–23	27 November 2022	(Finland) Ruka	10 km/HS142	1st (51)
70	2022–23	3 December 2022	(Norway) Lillehammer	HS100/10 km	2nd (13)
71	2022–23	4 December 2022	(Norway) Lillehammer	HS140/10 km	1st (52)
72	2022–23	16 December 2022	(Austria) Ramsau	HS98/10 km	1st (53)
73	2022–23	17 December 2022	(Austria) Ramsau	HS98/10 km	3rd (7)
74	2022–23	22 January 2023	(Germany) Klingenthal	10 km/HS140	3rd (8)
75	2022–23	22 January 2023	(Germany) Klingenthal	HS140/10 km	2nd (14)
76	2022–23	11 March 2023	(Norway) Oslo	HS134/10 km	1st (54)
77	2022–23	12 March 2023	(Norway) Oslo	HS134/10 km	1st (55)
78	2022–23	25 March 2023	(Finland) Lahti	HS130/10 km	1st (56)
79	2022–23	26 March 2023	(Finland) Lahti	HS130/10 km	1st (57)
80	2023–24	24 November 2023	(Finland) Ruka	COM HS142/7.5 km	2nd (15)
81	2023–24	25 November 2023	(Finland) Ruka	HS142/10 km	1st (58)
82	2023–24	26 November 2023	(Finland) Ruka	10 km/HS142	1st (59)
83	2023–24	2 December 2023	(Norway) Lillehammer	HS98/10 km	1st (60)
84	2023–24	3 December 2023	(Norway) Lillehammer	HS140/10 km	1st (61)
85	2023–24	15 December 2023	(Austria) Ramsau	10 km/HS98	2nd (16)
86	2023–24	16 December 2023	(Austria) Ramsau	COM HS98/7.5 km	2nd (17)
87	2023–24	13 January 2024	(Germany) Oberstdorf	HS106/10 km	1st (62)
88	2023–24	14 January 2024	(Germany) Oberstdorf	COM HS106/7.5 km	1st (63)
89	2023–24	27 January 2024	(Germany) Schonach	HS100/10 km	1st (64)
90	2023–24	28 January 2024	(Germany) Schonach	HS100/10 km	1st (65)
91	2023–24	2 February 2024	(Austria) Seefeld	HS109/7.5 km	1st (66)
92	2023–24	3 February 2024	(Austria) Seefeld	HS109/10 km	1st (67)
93	2023–24	4 February 2024	(Austria) Seefeld	HS109/12.5 km	1st (68)
94	2023–24	9 February 2024	(Estonia) Otepää	10 km/HS97	1st (69)
95	2023–24	10 February 2024	(Estonia) Otepää	HS97/10 km	1st (70)
96	2023–24	11 February 2024	(Estonia) Otepää	HS97/10 km	1st (71)
97	2023–24	9 March 2024	(Norway) Oslo	HS134/10 km	1st (72)
98	2023–24	10 March 2024	(Norway) Oslo	HS134/10 km	1st (73)
99	2024–25	29 November 2024	(Finland) Ruka	COM HS142/7.5 km	1st (74)
100	2024–25	1 December 2024	(Finland) Ruka	10 km/HS142	2nd (18)
101	2024–25	7 December 2024	(Norway) Lillehammer	HS98/10 km	1st (75)
102	2024–25	8 December 2024	(Norway) Lillehammer	COM HS140/7.5 km	3rd (9)
103	2024–25	20 December 2024	(Austria) Ramsau	10 km/HS98	1st (76)
104	2024–25	19 January 2025	(Germany) Schonach	COM HS100/7.5 km	2nd (19)
105	2024–25	31 January 2025	(Austria) Seefeld	10 km/HS109	1st (77)
106	2024–25	1 February 2025	(Austria) Seefeld	COM HS109/7.5 km	2nd (20)
107	2024–25	2 February 2025	(Austria) Seefeld	HS109/12.5 km	2nd (21)
108	2024–25	7 February 2025	(Estonia) Otepää	10 km/HS97	1st (78)
109	2024–25	8 February 2025	(Estonia) Otepää	HS97/10 km	2nd (22)
110	2024–25	9 February 2025	(Estonia) Otepää	COM HS97/7.5 km	2nd (23)
111	2024–25	15 March 2025	(Norway) Oslo	HS134/10 km	2nd (24)
