= Mari Leinan Lund =

Norwegian Nordic combined skier (born 1999)

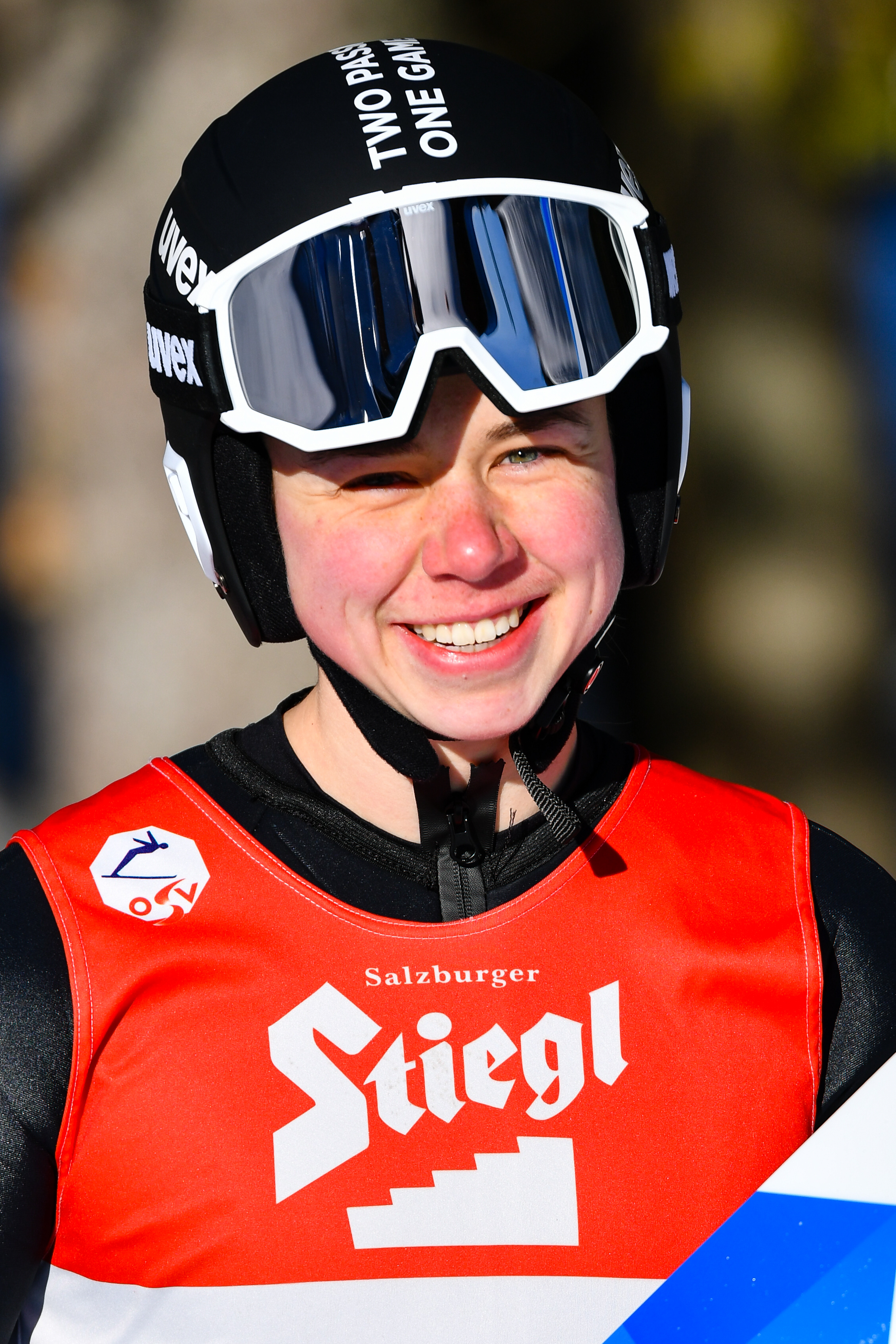
- Mari Leinan Lund in 2020

Personal information
- Nationality: Norway
- Born: 28 May 1999 (age 27)

Sport
- Sport: Skiing
- Club: Tolga IL

World Cup career
- Seasons: 2021–present
- Indiv. starts: 24
- Indiv. podiums: 12
- Indiv. wins: 2
Medal record
Women's Nordic combined
Representing Norway
World Championships
Silver medal – second place	2021 Oberstdorf	Individual NH
- Updated on 7 March 2024

Mari Leinan Lund (born 28 May 1999) is a Norwegian Nordic combined skier who represents Tolga IL. She took the silver medal in women's Nordic combined at the inaugural World Championship race, individual normal hill/5 km, at the FIS Nordic World Ski Championships 2021.

Her younger sister Marte Leinan Lund is also a Nordic combined skier.

== Career ==
Leinan Lund competed in the first ever women's Nordic combined World Cup race in Ramsau on 18 December 2020 where she finished 7th. At the FIS Nordic World Ski Championships 2021 she took the silver medal in the women's first ever race at a world championship. She shared the podium with her sister Marte Leinan Lund and the winner, fellow Norwegian Gyda Westvold Hansen.

== Nordic combined results ==
All results are sourced from the International Ski Federation (FIS).

=== World Championships ===
- 1 medal – (1 silver)

Year	Age	Normal Hill
2021	21	Silver
2023	23	20

=== World Cup ===
==== Season standings ====
Season	Age	Overall	Best Jumper Trophy	Best Skier Trophy	Compact Trophy	Mass Start Trophy
2021	21	7	10	9	—N/a	—N/a
2022	22	10	6	26	—N/a	—N/a
2023	23	17	21	18	—N/a	—N/a
2024	24	3rd place, bronze medalist(s)	2nd place, silver medalist(s)	8	8	—N/a
2025	25	Injured, out for season				
