= Marte Leinan Lund =

Norwegian Nordic combined skier

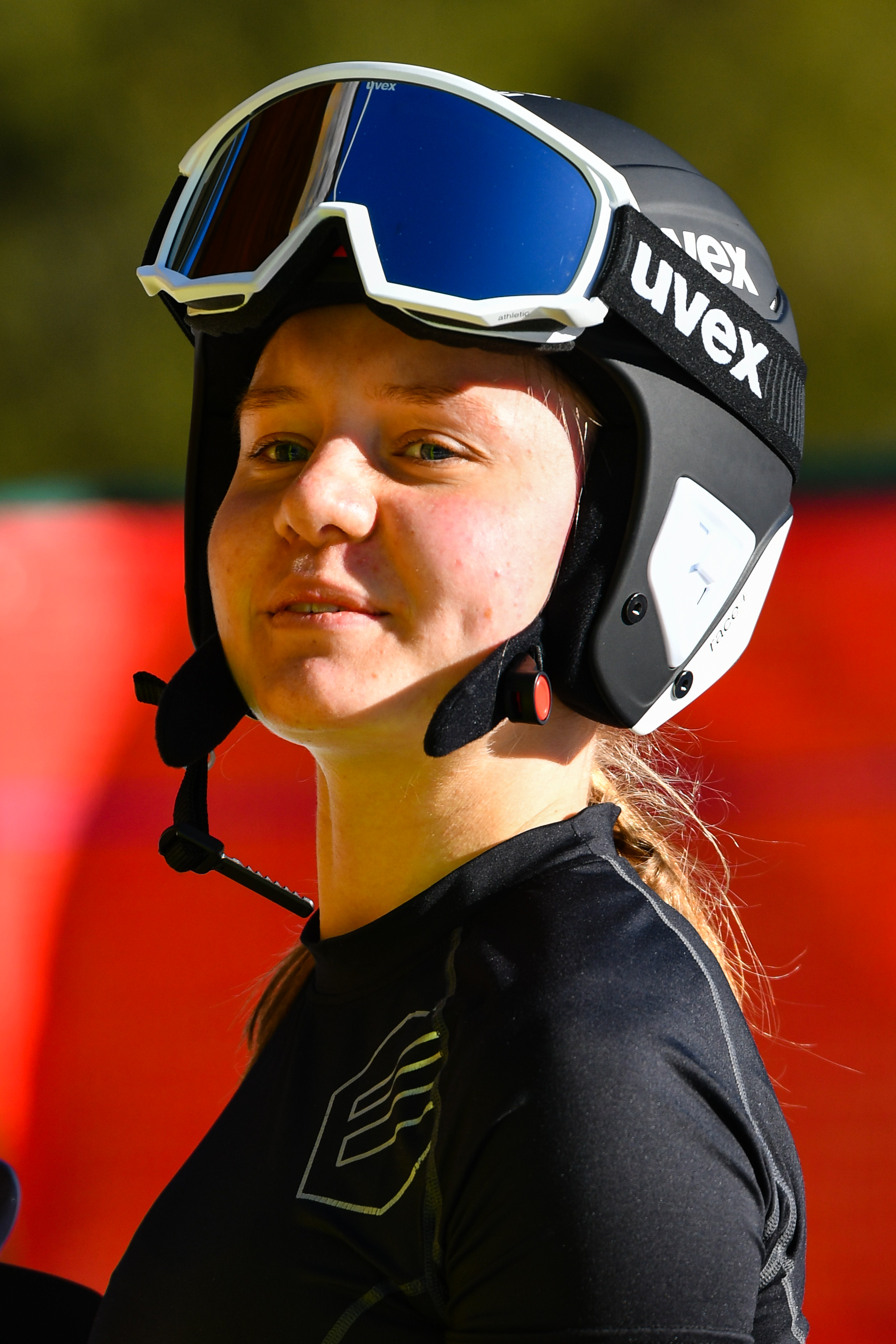
- Marte Leinan Lund in 2020

Personal information
- Nationality: Norway
- Born: 1 April 2001 (age 25)

Sport
- Sport: Skiing
- Club: Tolga IL

World Cup career
- Seasons: 2021–
- Indiv. starts: 41
- Indiv. podiums: 2
Medal record
Women's Nordic combined
Representing Norway
World Championships
Bronze medal – third place	2021 Oberstdorf	Individual NH
World Junior Championships
Gold medal – first place	2020 Oberwiesenthal	Mixed team NH
Gold medal – first place	2021 Lahti	Mixed team NH
Silver medal – second place	2021 Lahti	Individual NH
- Updated on 16 March 2025

Marte Leinan Lund (born 1 April 2001) is a Norwegian Nordic combined skier who represents Tolga IL. She took the bronze medal in women's Nordic combined at the inaugural World Championship race, individual normal hill/5 km, at the FIS Nordic World Ski Championships 2021.

Her older sister Mari Leinan Lund is also a Nordic combined skier.

== Career ==
Leinan Lund competed in the first ever women's Nordic combined World Cup race in Ramsau on 18 December 2020 where she finished 4th. At the FIS Nordic World Ski Championships 2021 she took the Bronze medal in the women's first ever race at a world championship. She shared the podium with her sister Mari Leinan Lund and the winner, fellow Norwegian Gyda Westvold Hansen.

== Nordic combined results ==
All results are sourced from the International Ski Federation (FIS).

=== World Championships ===
- 1 medal – (1 bronze)

Year	Age	Normal Hill	Mass Start Normal Hill	Mixed Team
2021	19	Bronze	—N/a	—N/a
2023	21	8	—N/a	—
2025	23	9	8	—

=== World Cup ===
==== Season standings ====
Season	Age	Overall	Best Jumper Trophy	Best Skier Trophy	Compact Trophy	Mass Start Trophy
2021	19	4	12	4	—N/a	—N/a
2022	20	6	9	5	—N/a	—N/a
2023	21	12	20	2nd place, silver medalist(s)	—N/a	—N/a
2024	22	13	18	4	5	—N/a
2025	23	11	21	3rd place, bronze medalist(s)	6	12
