= Lodenwalker =

Austrian textile company

- Native name: Lodenwalke Ramsau am Dachstein
- Industry: Textile
- Founded: 1434
- Headquarters: Rössing 122, 8972 Ramsau am Dachstein (Liezen District), Styria, Austria
- Key people: Jörg Steiner
- Website: lodenwalker.at/en

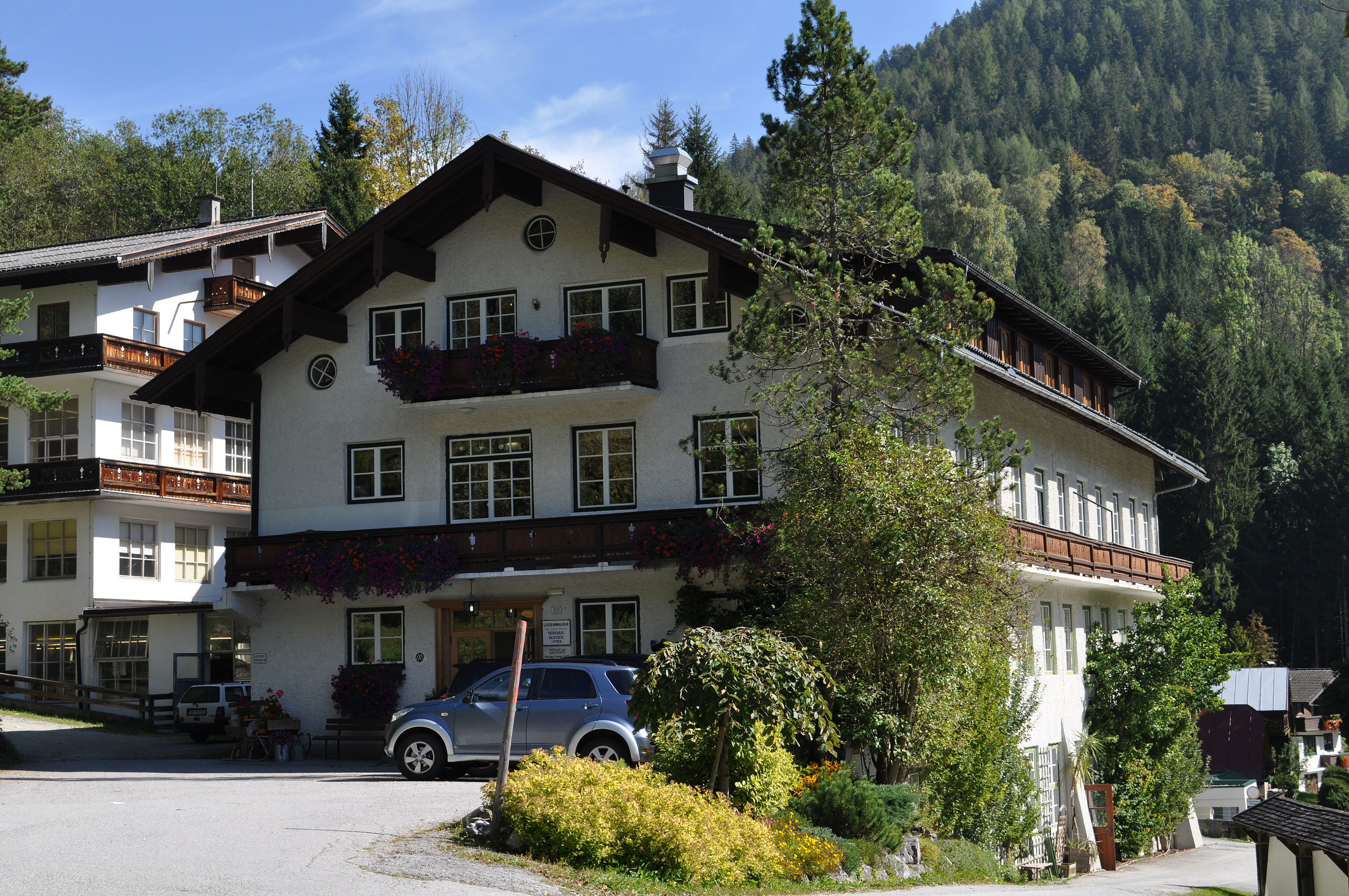
Lodenwalke Ramsau am Dachstein

Lodenwalke Ramsau am Dachstein is a traditional textile company located in Ramsau am Dachstein, Austria founded in 1434. It is the oldest business enterprise in Styria and tourists can see various machines over 200 years old.

== See also ==
- List of oldest companies
