= Gyda Westvold Hansen =

Norwegian Nordic combined skier (born 2002)

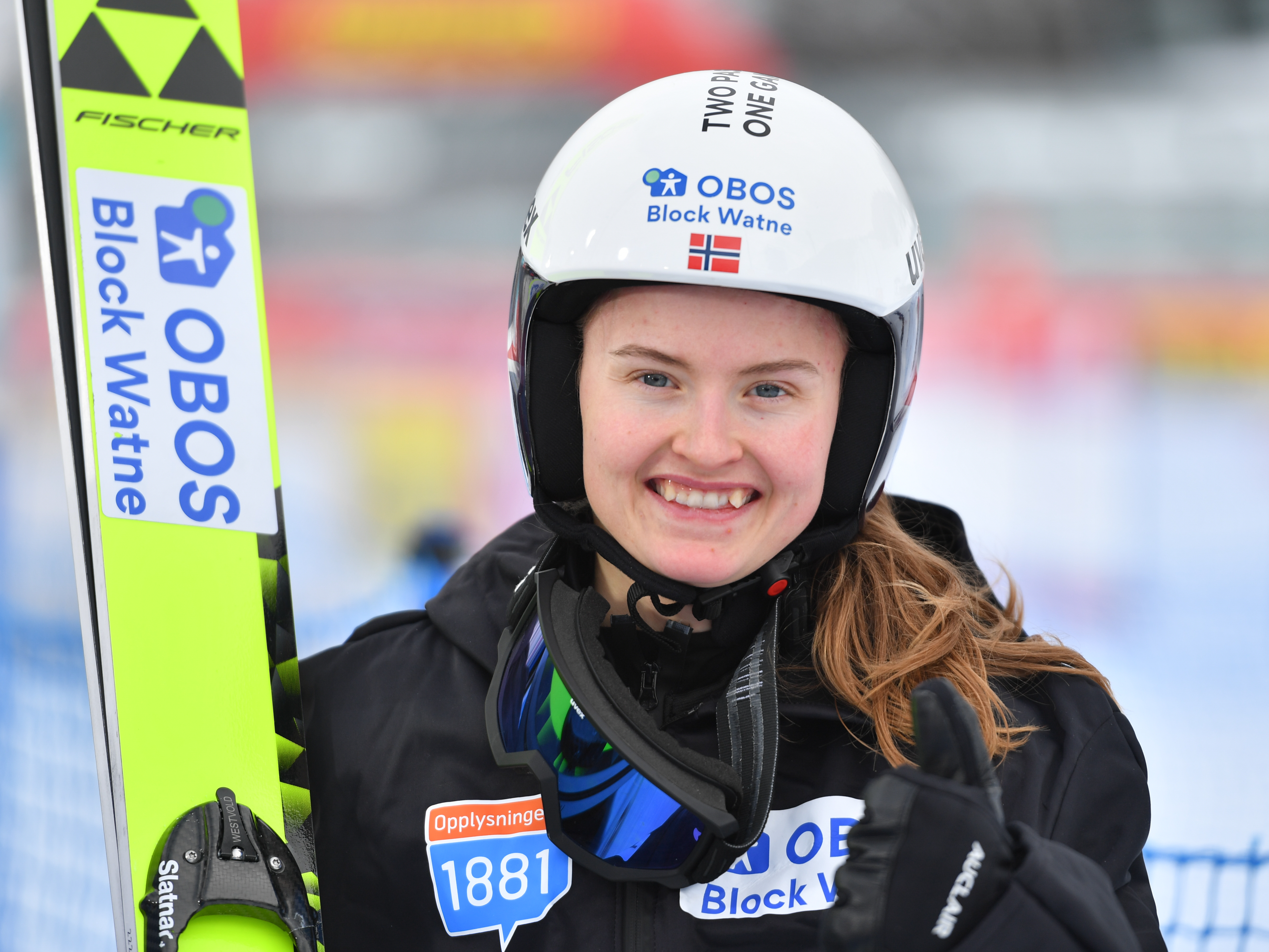
- Hansen in 2023

Personal information
- Nationality: Norway
- Born: 20 April 2002 (age 24) Trondheim, Norway

Sport
- Sport: Skiing
- Club: IL Nansen

World Cup career
- Seasons: 2021–present
- Indiv. starts: 45
- Indiv. podiums: 40
- Indiv. wins: 23
- Overall titles: 2 – (2022, 2023)
- Discipline titles: 4 – (4 BJT: 2021, 2022, 2023, 2024)
Medal record
Women's Nordic combined
Representing Norway
World Championships
Gold medal – first place	2021 Oberstdorf	Individual NH
Gold medal – first place	2023 Planica	Individual NH
Gold medal – first place	2023 Planica	Mixed team NH
Gold medal – first place	2025 Trondheim	Individual NH
Gold medal – first place	2025 Trondheim	Mixed team NH
Silver medal – second place	2025 Trondheim	Mass start NH
Youth Olympic Games
Gold medal – first place	2020 Lausanne	Mixed team NH
World Junior Championships
Gold medal – first place	2020 Oberwiesenthal	Mixed team NH
Gold medal – first place	2021 Lahti	Individual NH
Silver medal – second place	2019 Lahti	Individual NH
Silver medal – second place	2020 Oberwiesenthal	Individual NH
- Updated on 16 March 2025

Gyda Westvold Hansen (born 20 April 2002) is a Norwegian Nordic combined skier who represents IL Nansen. She became the first ever World Champion in women's Nordic combined after winning the gold medal in the inaugural World Championship race, individual normal hill/5 km, at the FIS Nordic World Ski Championships 2021. She is the 2021 World Junior Champion in individual normal hill and won the silver medal at the same event in 2019 and 2020. Hansen was also a member of the Norwegian team that took the gold medal in the mixed team normal hill competition at the 2020 Winter Youth Olympics.

She is the cousin of cross-country skier Therese Johaug.

== Career ==
Hansen competed in the first ever women's Nordic combined World Cup race in Ramsau on 18 December 2020. She was the leader after the ski jumping phase with her 94.5 meters jump on HS98 hill, but overtaken by Tara Geraghty-Moats in the 5 km cross-country leg and finished the race in 2nd place.

Hansen has further 5 individual victories and 15 podiums in the Nordic Combined Continental Cup. She has also competed in special ski jumping events and won 2 Continental Cup races in her career.

== Nordic combined results ==
All results are sourced from the International Ski Federation (FIS).

=== World Championships ===
- 6 medals – (5 gold, 1 silver)

Year	Age	Normal Hill	Mass Start Normal Hill	Mixed Team
2021	18	Gold	—N/a	—N/a
2023	20	Gold	—N/a	Gold
2025	22	Gold	Silver	Gold

=== World Cup ===
==== Season titles ====
- 6 titles – (2 Overall, 4 BJT)

Season	Discipline
2021	Best Jumper Trophy
2022	Overall
2022	Best Jumper Trophy
2023	Overall
2023	Best Jumper Trophy
2024	Best Jumper Trophy

==== Season standings ====
Season	Age	Overall	Best Jumper Trophy	Best Skier Trophy	Compact Trophy	Mass Start Trophy
2021	18	2nd place, silver medalist(s)	1st place, gold medalist(s)	3rd place, bronze medalist(s)	—N/a	—N/a
2022	19	1st place, gold medalist(s)	1st place, gold medalist(s)	3rd place, bronze medalist(s)	—N/a	—N/a
2023	20	1st place, gold medalist(s)	1st place, gold medalist(s)	3rd place, bronze medalist(s)	—N/a	—N/a
2024	21	2nd place, silver medalist(s)	1st place, gold medalist(s)	3rd place, bronze medalist(s)	2nd place, silver medalist(s)	—N/a
2025	22	5	11	5	3rd place, bronze medalist(s)	13

==== Individual podiums ====
- 23 wins – (21 NH, 2 LH)
- 40 podiums – (38 NH, 2 LH)

No.	Season	Date	Location	Hill	Size	Discipline	Place
1	2020–21	18 December 2020	Ramsau, Austria	W90-Mattensprunganlage	NH	HS98/5 km	2nd place, silver medalist(s)
2	2021–22	3 December 2021	Lillehammer, Norway	Lysgårdsbakken	NH	HS98/5 km	1st place, gold medalist(s)
3	2021–22	4 December 2021	Lillehammer, Norway	Lysgårdsbakken	NH	HS98/5 km	1st place, gold medalist(s)
4	2021–22	11 December 2021	Otepää, Estonia	Tehvandi	NH	5 km/HS97	1st place, gold medalist(s)
5	2021–22	12 December 2021	Otepää, Estonia	Tehvandi	NH	HS97/5 km	1st place, gold medalist(s)
6	2021–22	17 December 2021	Ramsau, Austria	W90-Mattensprunganlage	NH	HS98/5 km	1st place, gold medalist(s)
7	2021–22	8 January 2022	Val di Fiemme, Italy	Trampolino dal Ben	NH	5 km/HS106	1st place, gold medalist(s)
8	2021–22	13 March 2022	Schonach, Germany	Langenwaldschanze	NH	HS106/5 km	1st place, gold medalist(s)
9	2022–23	2 December 2022	Lillehammer, Norway	Lysgårdsbakken	NH	HS100/5 km	1st place, gold medalist(s)
10	2022–23	3 December 2022	Lillehammer, Norway	Lysgårdsbakken	NH	HS100/5 km	1st place, gold medalist(s)
11	2022–23	16 December 2022	Ramsau, Austria	W90-Mattensprunganlage	NH	HS98/5 km	1st place, gold medalist(s)
12	2022–23	17 December 2022	Ramsau, Austria	W90-Mattensprunganlage	NH	HS98/5 km	1st place, gold medalist(s)
13	2022–23	8 January 2023	Otepää, Estonia	Tehvandi	NH	HS97/5 km	1st place, gold medalist(s)
14	2022–23	27 January 2023	Seefeld, Austria	Toni-Seelos-Olympiaschanze	NH	HS109/5 km	1st place, gold medalist(s)
15	2022–23	28 January 2023	Seefeld, Austria	Toni-Seelos-Olympiaschanze	NH	HS109/5 km	1st place, gold medalist(s)
16	2022–23	11 February 2023	Schonach, Germany	Langenwaldschanze	NH	HS100/5 km	1st place, gold medalist(s)
17	2022–23	12 February 2023	Schonach, Germany	Langenwaldschanze	NH	HS100/5 km	1st place, gold medalist(s)
18	2022–23	11 March 2023	Oslo, Norway	Midtstubakken	NH	HS106/5 km	1st place, gold medalist(s)
19	2023–24	1 December 2023	Lillehammer, Norway	Lysgårdsbakken	NH	HS98/5 km	1st place, gold medalist(s)
20	2023–24	2 December 2023	Lillehammer, Norway	Lysgårdsbakken	NH	HS98/5 km	1st place, gold medalist(s)
21	2023–24	15 December 2023	Ramsau, Austria	W90-Mattensprunganlage	NH	HS98/5 km	1st place, gold medalist(s)
22	2023–24	16 December 2023	Ramsau, Austria	W90-Mattensprunganlage	NH	COM HS98/5 km	2nd place, silver medalist(s)
23	2023–24	13 January 2024	Oberstdorf, Germany	Allgäu	NH	HS106/5 km	3rd place, bronze medalist(s)
24	2023–24	14 January 2024	Oberstdorf, Germany	Allgäu	NH	COM HS106/5 km	2nd place, silver medalist(s)
25	2023–24	28 January 2024	Schonach, Germany	Langenwaldschanze	NH	HS100/8 km	3rd place, bronze medalist(s)
26	2023–24	3 February 2024	Seefeld, Austria	Toni-Seelos-Olympiaschanze	NH	COM HS109/5 km	2nd place, silver medalist(s)
27	2023–24	9 February 2024	Otepää, Estonia	Tehvandi	NH	5 km/HS97	1st place, gold medalist(s)
28	2023–24	10 February 2024	Otepää, Estonia	Tehvandi	NH	HS97/5 km	3rd place, bronze medalist(s)
29	2023–24	11 February 2024	Otepää, Estonia	Tehvandi	NH	HS97/5 km	3rd place, bronze medalist(s)
30	2023–24	9 March 2024	Oslo, Norway	Midtstubakken	NH	HS106/5 km	3rd place, bronze medalist(s)
31	2023–24	17 March 2024	Trondheim, Norway	Granåsen	NH	HS105/7.5 km	3rd place, bronze medalist(s)
32	2024–25	6 December 2024	Lillehammer, Norway	Lysgårdsbakken	NH	HS98/5 km	2nd place, silver medalist(s)
33	2024–25	7 December 2024	Lillehammer, Norway	Lysgårdsbakken	NH	COM HS98/5 km	3rd place, bronze medalist(s)
34	2024–25	21 December 2024	Ramsau, Austria	W90-Mattensprunganlage	NH	COM HS98/5 km	3rd place, bronze medalist(s)
35	2024–25	19 January 2025	Schonach, Germany	Langenwaldschanze	NH	COM HS100/6 km	2nd place, silver medalist(s)
36	2024–25	31 January 2025	Seefeld, Austria	Toni-Seelos-Olympiaschanze	NH	5 km/HS109	2nd place, silver medalist(s)
37	2024–25	1 February 2025	Seefeld, Austria	Toni-Seelos-Olympiaschanze	NH	COM HS109/5 km	2nd place, silver medalist(s)
38	2024–25	2 February 2025	Seefeld, Austria	Toni-Seelos-Olympiaschanze	NH	HS109/7.5 km	2nd place, silver medalist(s)
39	2024–25	15 March 2025	Oslo, Norway	Holmenkollbakken	LH	HS134/5 km	1st place, gold medalist(s)
40	2024–25	16 March 2025	Oslo, Norway	Holmenkollbakken	LH	COM HS134/5 km	1st place, gold medalist(s)
