= Anju Nakamura =

Japanese Nordic combined skier

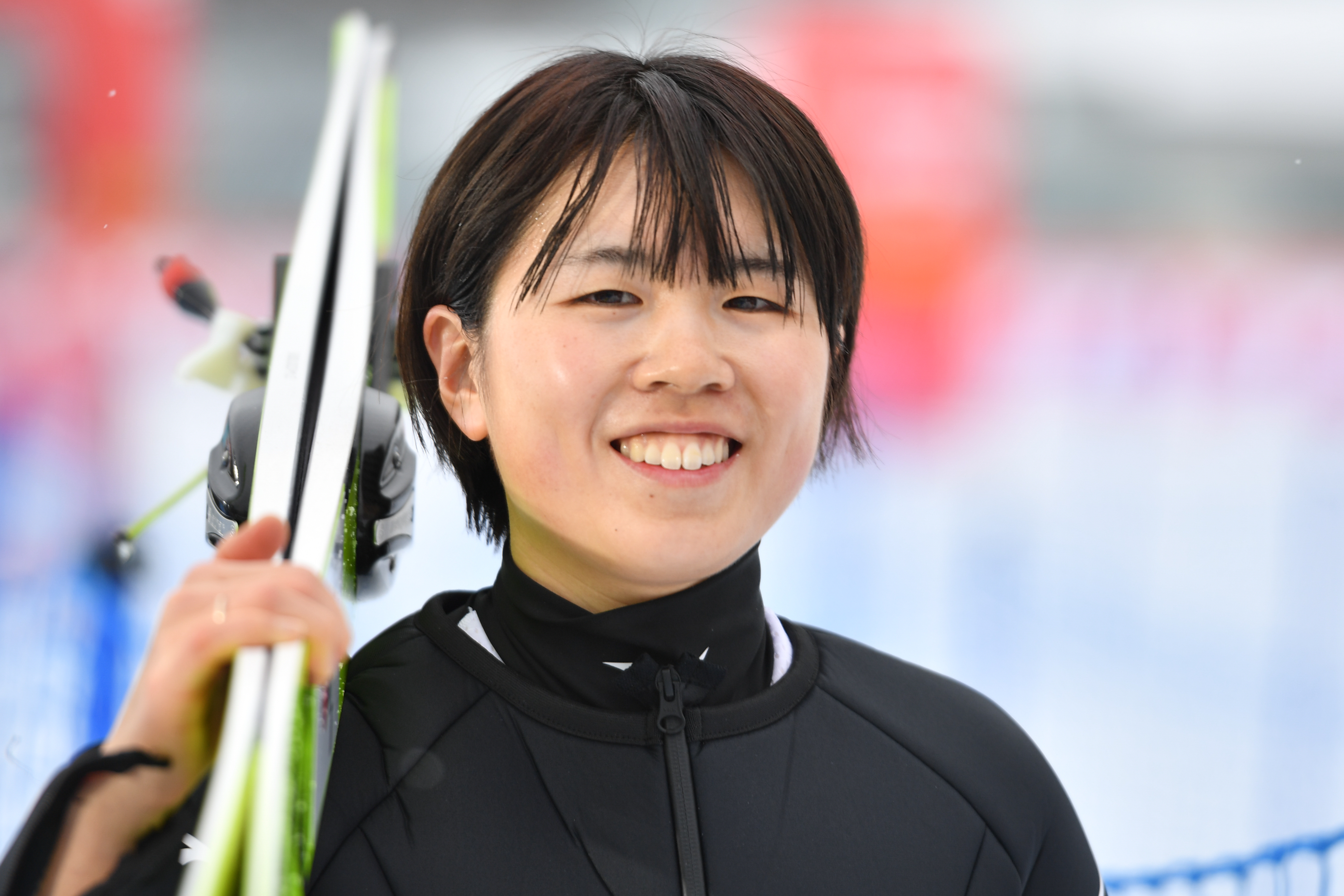

Personal information
- Nationality: Japan
- Born: 23 January 2000 (age 26)
- Height: 155 cm (5 ft 1 in)

Sport
- Sport: Skiing
- Club: Tokai University

World Cup career
- Seasons: 2021–
- Indiv. starts: 32
- Indiv. podiums: 4
- Indiv. wins: 1
- Overall titles: 0 – (3rd in 2021)
- Discipline titles: 1 – (1 BST: 2022)
Medal record
Women's Nordic combined
Representing Japan
World Junior Championships
| Bronze medal – third place | 2019 Lahti | Individual NH |
| Bronze medal – third place | 2020 Oberwiesenthal | Mixed team NH |

Anju Nakamura (Japanese: 中村 安寿, Nakamura Anju; born 23 January 2000) is a Japanese Nordic combined skier.

== Career ==
Competing in the 2020–21 FIS Nordic Combined World Cup, Nakamura placed 3rd overall. She competed at the FIS Nordic World Ski Championships 2021, where she placed fourth in women's individual normal hill/5 km. She won bronze medals at the 2019 and 2020 Nordic Junior World Ski Championships.

== Nordic combined results ==
All results are sourced from the International Ski Federation (FIS).

=== World Championships ===
- 0 medal

| Year | Age | Normal Hill |
|---|---|---|
| 2021 | 21 | 4 |
| 2023 | 23 | 7 |

=== World Cup ===
==== Season standings ====
| Season | Age | Overall | Best Jumper Trophy | Best Skier Trophy | Compact Trophy |
|---|---|---|---|---|---|
| 2021 | 21 | 3rd place, bronze medalist(s) | 3rd place, bronze medalist(s) | 2nd place, silver medalist(s) | —N/a |
| 2022 | 22 | 4th | 12th | 1st place, gold medalist(s) | —N/a |
| 2023 | 23 | 9th | 11th | 4th | —N/a |
| 2024 | 24 | 12th | 15th | 6th | 7th |
