= FIS Nordic World Ski Championships 2023 – Women's individual normal hill/5 km =

Women's individual normal hill/5 km at the FIS Nordic World Ski Championships 2023
- Venue: Planica Nordic Centre
- Location: Planica, Slovenia
- Dates: 24 February
- Competitors: 31 from 11 nations
- Winning time: 14:27.1

Medalists
gold medal	Gyda Westvold Hansen	Norway
silver medal	Nathalie Armbruster	Germany
bronze medal	Haruka Kasai	Japan

The Women's individual normal hill/5 km competition at the FIS Nordic World Ski Championships 2023 was held on 24 February 2023.

== Results ==
=== Ski jumping ===
The ski jumping part was held at 11:32.

Rank	Bib	Name	Country	Distance (m)	Points	Time difference
1	31	Gyda Westvold Hansen	Norway	91.0	114.4	
2	30	Nathalie Armbruster	Germany	98.0	109.4	+0:20
3	24	Haruka Kasai	Japan	96.5	107.5	+0:28
4	26	Yuna Kasai	Japan	94.5	107.0	+0:30
5	29	Annika Sieff	Italy	94.0	106.8	+0:30
6	18	Svenja Würth	Germany	94.5	106.4	+0:32
7	22	Ema Volavšek	Slovenia	91.0	101.5	+0:52
8	20	Annalena Slamik	Austria	89.5	99.3	+1:00
8	16	Maria Gerboth	Germany	91.0	99.3	+1:00
10	25	Jenny Nowak	Germany	90.0	97.8	+1:06
11	28	Ida Marie Hagen	Norway	92.0	97.4	+1:08
12	27	Lisa Hirner	Austria	89.0	95.2	+1:17
12	21	Anju Nakamura	Japan	88.0	95.2	+1:17
14	11	Claudia Purker	Austria	88.0	94.9	+1:18
15	17	Marte Leinan Lund	Norway	89.5	92.6	+1:27
16	23	Léna Brocard	France	87.5	91.4	+1:32
17	19	Veronica Gianmoena	Italy	86.5	90.8	+1:34
18	2	Teja Pavec	Slovenia	77.5	83.4	+2:04
19	7	Joanna Kil	Poland	80.0	79.6	+2:19
20	12	Daniela Dejori	Italy	80.0	79.2	+2:21
21	6	Alva Thors	Finland	81.0	77.5	+2:28
22	14	Sana Azegami	Japan	80.0	75.3	+2:36
23	8	Silva Verbič	Slovenia	79.0	75.0	+2:38
24	15	Mari Leinan Lund	Norway	90.0	72.8	+2:46
25	10	Annika Malacinski	United States	77.0	69.7	+2:59
26	9	Minja Korhonen	Finland	76.0	66.3	+3:12
27	3	Greta Pinzani	Italy	74.0	65.4	+3:16
28	1	Anna Kerko	Finland	68.5	64.8	+3:18
29	5	Tereza Koldovská	Czech Republic	70.5	57.1	+3:49
30	13	Mille Marie Hagen	Norway	71.5	56.9	+3:50
31	4	Alexa Brabec	United States	69.0	50.1	+4:17

=== Cross-country skiing ===
The cross-country skiing part was held at 14:15.

Rank	Bib	Athlete	Country	Start time	Cross-country time	Cross-country rank	Finish time	Deficit
1st place, gold medalist(s)	1	Gyda Westvold Hansen	Norway	0:00	14:27.1	6	14:27.1	
2nd place, silver medalist(s)	2	Nathalie Armbruster	Germany	0:20	14:18.6	4	14:38.6	+11.5
3rd place, bronze medalist(s)	3	Haruka Kasai	Japan	0:28	14:14.8	3	14:42.8	+15.7
4	11	Ida Marie Hagen	Norway	1:08	13:48.8	1	14:56.8	+29.7
5	4	Yuna Kasai	Japan	0:30	14:48.8	9	15:18.8	+51.7
6	5	Annika Sieff	Italy	0:30	14:49.4	10	15:19.4	+52.3
7	13	Anju Nakamura	Japan	1:17	14:11.6	2	15:28.6	+1:01.5
8	15	Marte Leinan Lund	Norway	1:27	14:18.6	4	15:45.6	+1:18.5
9	9	Maria Gerboth	Germany	1:00	14:54.8	12	15:54.8	+1:27.7
10	12	Lisa Hirner	Austria	1:17	14:42.7	7	15:59.7	+1:32.6
11	10	Jenny Nowak	Germany	1:06	14:54.1	11	16:00.1	+1:33.0
12	7	Ema Volavšek	Slovenia	0:52	15:12.6	18	16:04.6	+1:37.5
13	6	Svenja Würth	Germany	0:32	15:35.8	23	16:07.8	+1:40.7
14	8	Annalena Slamik	Austria	1:00	15:17.7	20	16:17.7	+1:50.6
15	16	Léna Brocard	France	1:32	14:46.9	8	16:18.9	+1:51.8
16	14	Claudia Purker	Austria	1:18	15:05.4	14	16:23.4	+1:56.3
17	17	Veronica Gianmoena	Italy	1:34	15:40.1	24	17:14.1	+2:47.0
18	20	Daniela Dejori	Italy	2:21	15:05.9	15	17:26.9	+2:59.8
19	19	Joanna Kil	Poland	2:19	15:15.6	19	17:34.6	+3:07.5
20	24	Mari Leinan Lund	Norway	2:46	15:12.2	17	17:58.2	+3:31.1
21	22	Sana Azegami	Japan	2:36	15:51.9	26	18:27.9	+4:00.8
22	25	Annika Malacinski	United States	2:59	15:31.1	22	18:30.1	+4:03.0
23	26	Minja Korhonen	Finland	3:12	15:18.9	21	18:30.9	+4:03.8
24	30	Mille Marie Hagen	Norway	3:50	15:04.0	13	18:54.0	+4:26.9
25	27	Greta Pinzani	Italy	3:16	15:42.6	25	18:58.6	+4:31.5
26	23	Silva Verbič	Slovenia	2:38	16:29.1	28	19:07.1	+4:40.0
27	21	Alva Thors	Finland	2:28	16:42.1	29	19:10.1	+4:43.0
28	31	Alexa Brabec	United States	4:17	15:06.5	16	19:23.5	+4:56.4
29	18	Teja Pavec	Slovenia	2:04	17:40.1	31	19:44.1	+5:17.0
30	29	Tereza Koldovská	Czech Republic	3:49	16:18.9	27	20:07.9	+5:40.8
31	28	Anna Kerko	Finland	3:18	17:21.3	30	20:39.3	+6:12.2
