= FIS Nordic World Ski Championships 2021 – Women's individual normal hill/5 km =

Germany FIS Nordic women championship (2021)

Women's individual normal hill/5 km at the FIS Nordic World Ski Championships 2021
- Location: Oberstdorf, Germany
- Date: 27 February
- Competitors: 31 from 10 nations
- Winning time: 13:10.4

Medalists
| gold medal | Gyda Westvold Hansen | Norway |
| silver medal | Mari Leinan Lund | Norway |
| bronze medal | Marte Leinan Lund | Norway |

The Women's individual normal hill/5 km competition at the FIS Nordic World Ski Championships 2021 was held on 27 February 2021.

== Results ==
=== Ski jumping ===
The ski jumping part was held at 10:00.

| Rank | Bib | Name | Country | Distance (m) | Points | Time difference |
|---|---|---|---|---|---|---|
| 1 | 25 | Mari Leinan Lund | Norway | 107.0 | 127.8 | |
| 2 | 30 | Gyda Westvold Hansen | Norway | 102.5 | 127.0 | +0:03 |
| 3 | 11 | Svenja Würth | Germany | 101.5 | 121.9 | +0:24 |
| 4 | 28 | Marte Leinan Lund | Norway | 101.0 | 121.7 | +0:24 |
| 5 | 24 | Annika Sieff | Italy | 95.5 | 118.1 | +0:39 |
| 6 | 29 | Anju Nakamura | Japan | 96.5 | 115.4 | +0:50 |
| 7 | 15 | Annalena Slamik | Austria | 102.0 | 113.7 | +0:56 |
| 8 | 19 | Stefaniya Nadymova | Russian Ski Federation | 98.0 | 110.8 | +1:08 |
| 9 | 22 | Daniela Dejori | Italy | 94.0 | 109.0 | +1:15 |
| 10 | 17 | Ayane Miyazaki | Japan | 98.5 | 108.8 | +1:16 |
| 11 | 27 | Sigrun Kleinrath | Austria | 94.0 | 108.7 | +1:16 |
| 12 | 9 | Claudia Purker | Austria | 94.0 | 104.7 | +1:32 |
| 13 | 26 | Lisa Hirner | Austria | 89.5 | 104.5 | +1:33 |
| 14 | 16 | Mille Moen Flatla | Norway | 94.0 | 102.2 | +1:42 |
| 15 | 20 | Yuna Kasai | Japan | 93.5 | 100.6 | +1:49 |
| 16 | 12 | Sana Azegami | Japan | 93.0 | 100.0 | +1:51 |
| 17 | 21 | Jenny Nowak | Germany | 90.5 | 98.4 | +1:58 |
| 18 | 31 | Tara Geraghty-Moats | United States | 86.0 | 94.6 | +2:13 |
| 18 | 2 | Cindy Haasch | Germany | 91.0 | 94.6 | +2:13 |
| 20 | 14 | Maria Gerboth | Germany | 90.5 | 88.9 | +2:36 |
| 21 | 18 | Ema Volavšek | Slovenia | 84.5 | 85.4 | +2:50 |
| 22 | 13 | Léna Brocard | France | 88.0 | 84.5 | +2:53 |
| 23 | 10 | Svetlana Gladikova | Russian Ski Federation | 85.5 | 81.9 | +3:04 |
| 24 | 3 | Lena Prinoth | Italy | 83.0 | 77.2 | +3:22 |
| 25 | 8 | Silva Verbič | Slovenia | 81.5 | 75.7 | +3:28 |
| 26 | 7 | Annika Malacinski | United States | 81.5 | 75.3 | +3:30 |
| 27 | 6 | Alexa Brabec | United States | 69.5 | 48.8 | +5:16 |
| 28 | 1 | Tereza Koldovská | Czech Republic | 68.0 | 42.6 | +5:41 |
| 29 | 5 | Tess Arnone | United States | 61.0 | 31.2 | +6:26 |
| | 4 | Chulpan Valieva | Russian Ski Federation | Disqualified | | |
| | 23 | Anastasia Goncharova | Russian Ski Federation | Disqualified | | |

=== Cross-country skiing ===
The cross-country skiing part was started at 15:30.

| Rank | Bib | Athlete | Country | Start time | Cross-country time | Cross-country rank | Finish time | Deficit |
|---|---|---|---|---|---|---|---|---|
| 1st place, gold medalist(s) | 2 | Gyda Westvold Hansen | Norway | 0:03 | 13:07.4 | 4 | 13:10.4 | |
| 2nd place, silver medalist(s) | 1 | Mari Leinan Lund | Norway | 0:00 | 13:24.2 | 8 | 13:24.2 | +13.8 |
| 3rd place, bronze medalist(s) | 4 | Marte Leinan Lund | Norway | 0:24 | 13:15.2 | 5 | 13:39.2 | +28.8 |
| 4 | 6 | Anju Nakamura | Japan | 0:50 | 13:00.3 | 2 | 13:50.3 | +39.9 |
| 5 | 18 | Tara Geraghty-Moats | United States | 2:13 | 12:06.8 | 1 | 14:19.8 | +1:09.4 |
| 6 | 5 | Annika Sieff | Italy | 0:39 | 13:41.1 | 12 | 14:20.1 | +1:09.7 |
| 7 | 9 | Daniela Dejori | Italy | 1:15 | 13:21.4 | 7 | 14:36.4 | +1:26.0 |
| 8 | 13 | Lisa Hirner | Austria | 1:33 | 13:15.9 | 6 | 14:48.9 | +1:38.5 |
| 9 | 11 | Sigrun Kleinrath | Austria | 1:16 | 13:33.9 | 10 | 14:49.9 | +1:39.5 |
| 10 | 10 | Ayane Miyazaki | Japan | 1:16 | 13:38.0 | 11 | 14:54.0 | +1:43.6 |
| 11 | 19 | Cindy Haasch | Germany | 2:13 | 13:06.6 | 3 | 15:19.6 | +2:09.2 |
| 12 | 16 | Sana Azegami | Japan | 1:51 | 13:29.4 | 9 | 15:20.4 | +2:10.0 |
| 13 | 8 | Stefaniya Nadymova | Russian Ski Federation | 1:08 | 14:14.6 | 23 | 15:22.6 | +2:12.2 |
| 14 | 7 | Annalena Slamik | Austria | 0:56 | 14:32.4 | 26 | 15:28.4 | +2:18.0 |
| 15 | 14 | Mille Moen Flatla | Norway | 1:42 | 13:51.7 | 17 | 15:33.7 | +2:23.3 |
| 16 | 15 | Yuna Kasai | Japan | 1:49 | 13:47.7 | 15 | 15:36.7 | +2:26.3 |
| 17 | 3 | Svenja Würth | Germany | 0:24 | 15:17.3 | 28 | 15:41.3 | +2:30.9 |
| 18 | 17 | Jenny Nowak | Germany | 1:58 | 14:00.9 | 19 | 15:58.9 | +2:48.5 |
| 19 | 20 | Maria Gerboth | Germany | 2:36 | 13:46.3 | 14 | 16:22.3 | +3:11.9 |
| 20 | 21 | Ema Volavšek | Slovenia | 2:50 | 13:42.4 | 13 | 16:32.4 | +3:22.6 |
| 21 | 22 | Léna Brocard | France | 2:53 | 13:49.1 | 16 | 16:42.1 | +3:31.7 |
| 22 | 24 | Lena Prinoth | Italy | 3:22 | 14:10.6 | 21 | 17:32.6 | +4:22.2 |
| 23 | 26 | Annika Malacinski | United States | 3:30 | 14:07.6 | 20 | 17:37.6 | +4:27.2 |
| 24 | 23 | Svetlana Gladikova | Russian Ski Federation | 3:04 | 14:39.6 | 27 | 17:43.6 | +4:33.2 |
| 25 | 12 | Claudia Purker | Austria | 1:32 | 16:37.0 | 29 | 18:09.0 | +4:58.6 |
| 26 | 27 | Alexa Brabec | United States | 5:16 | 13:59.0 | 18 | 19:15.0 | +6:04.6 |
| 27 | 28 | Tereza Koldovská | Czech Republic | 5:41 | 14:21.2 | 25 | 20:02.2 | +6:51.8 |
| 28 | 29 | Tess Arnone | United States | 6:26 | 14:15.6 | 24 | 20:41.6 | +7:31.2 |
| | 25 | Silva Verbič | Slovenia | 3:28 | Did not finish | | | |
