= FIS Nordic World Ski Championships 2025 – Women's 5 km mass start/individual normal hill =

Women's 5 km mass start/individual normal hill at the FIS Nordic World Ski Championships 2025
- Venue: Granåsen Ski Centre
- Location: Trondheim, Norway
- Dates: 27 February
- Competitors: 36 from 12 nations
- Winning points: 121.0

Medalists
gold medal	Yuna Kasai	Japan
silver medal	Gyda Westvold Hansen	Norway
bronze medal	Haruka Kasai	Japan

The Women's 5 km mass start/individual normal hill competition at the FIS Nordic World Ski Championships 2025 was held on 27 February 2025.

== Results ==
=== Cross-country skiing ===
The cross-country race was started at 15:00.

Rank	Bib	Name	Country	Time	Deficit	Point deficit
1	5	Gyda Westvold Hansen	Norway	13:36.3		0.0
2	13	Marte Leinan Lund	Norway	13:38.3	+2.0	–0.5
3	4	Yuna Kasai	Japan	13:39.9	+3.6	–0.9
4	1	Nathalie Armbruster	Germany	13:40.5	+4.2	–1.1
5	3	Ida Marie Hagen	Norway	13:43.3	+7.0	–1.8
6	7	Minja Korhonen	Finland	13:53.5	+17.2	–4.3
7	11	Alexa Brabec	United States	13:54.6	+18.3	–4.6
8	2	Haruka Kasai	Japan	14:02.9	+26.6	–6.7
9	10	Ema Volavšek	Slovenia	14:06.4	+30.1	–7.5
10	6	Léna Brocard	France	14:08.0	+31.7	–7.9
11	8	Jenny Nowak	Germany	14:08.0	+31.7	–7.9
12	36	Maša Likozar Brankovič	Slovenia	14:27.0	+50.7	–12.7
13	24	Daniela Dejori	Italy	14:31.3	+55.0	–13.8
14	18	Lisa Hirner	Austria	14:31.8	+55.5	–13.9
15	15	Yuzuki Kainuma	Japan	14:32.3	+56.0	–14.0
16	29	Tia Malovrh	Slovenia	14:37.7	+1:01.4	–15.4
17	12	Claudia Purker	Austria	14:38.7	+1:02.4	–15.6
18	26	Greta Pinzani	Italy	14:45.6	+1:09.3	–17.3
19	17	Joanna Kil	Poland	14:47.1	+1:10.8	–17.7
20	35	Kai McKinnon	United States	15:02.8	+1:26.5	–21.6
21	19	Sana Azegami	Japan	15:03.9	+1:27.6	–21.9
22	20	Heta Hirvonen	Finland	15:06.9	+1:30.6	–22.7
23	27	Trine Göpfert	Germany	15:09.1	+1:32.8	–23.2
24	28	Marion Droz Vincent	France	15:10.0	+1:33.7	–23.4
25	23	Veronica Gianmoena	Italy	15:10.8	+1:34.5	–23.6
26	22	Katharina Gruber	Austria	15:11.6	+1:35.3	–23.8
27	25	Teja Pavec	Slovenia	15:20.4	+1:44.1	–26.0
28	14	Annika Malacinski	United States	15:22.2	+1:45.9	–26.5
29	16	Annalena Slamik	Austria	15:37.6	+2:01.3	–30.4
30	9	Maria Gerboth	Germany	15:50.7	+2:14.4	–33.6
31	31	Anna Senoner	Italy	15:55.7	+2:19.4	–34.9
32	30	Ingrid Låte	Norway	15:56.2	+2:19.9	–35.0
33	21	Tereza Koldovská	Czech Republic	16:07.3	+2:31.0	–37.8
34	32	Jolana Hradilová	Czech Republic	16:30.2	+2:53.9	–43.5
35	34	Ella Wilson	United States	17:12.0	+3:35.7	–53.9
36	33	Karina Kozlova	Ukraine	18:47.5	+5:11.2	–77.8

=== Ski jumping ===
The ski jumping was started at 17:00.

Rank	Bib	Name	Country	Distance (m)	Points	Deficit	Total
1st place, gold medalist(s)	34	Yuna Kasai	Japan	96.5	121.9	–0.9	121.0
2nd place, silver medalist(s)	36	Gyda Westvold Hansen	Norway	94.5	118.7	0.0	118.7
3rd place, bronze medalist(s)	29	Haruka Kasai	Japan	96.0	122.3	–6.7	115.6
4	30	Alexa Brabec	United States	93.0	116.0	–4.6	111.4
5	26	Jenny Nowak	Germany	95.0	119.1	–7.9	111.2
6	33	Nathalie Armbruster	Germany	89.0	110.0	–1.1	108.9
7	23	Lisa Hirner	Austria	94.0	119.6	–13.9	105.7
8	35	Marte Leinan Lund	Norway	88.0	102.6	–0.5	102.1
9	5	Ingrid Låte	Norway	100.5	129.0	–35.0	94.0
10	32	Ida Marie Hagen	Norway	86.8	95.6	–1.8	93.8
11	28	Ema Volavšek	Slovenia	86.0	95.1	–7.5	87.6
12	31	Minja Korhonen	Finland	87.0	91.7	–4.3	87.4
13	8	Annalena Slamik	Austria	100.5	116.4	–30.3	86.1
14	20	Claudia Purker	Austria	91.5	101.0	–15.6	85.4
15	27	Léna Brocard	France	83.5	91.0	–7.9	83.1
16	21	Tia Malovrh	Slovenia	91.5	97.8	–15.4	82.4
17	14	Trine Göpfert	Germany	93.5	103.3	–23.2	80.1
18	10	Teja Pavec	Slovenia	94.5	104.4	–26.0	78.4
19	22	Yuzuki Kainuma	Japan	86.0	90.1	–14.0	76.1
19	15	Heta Hirvonen	Finland	90.5	98.8	–22.7	76.1
21	7	Maria Gerboth	Germany	94.5	104.7	–33.6	71.1
22	11	Katharina Gruber	Austria	87.5	90.9	–23.8	67.1
23	25	Maša Likozar Brankovič	Slovenia	77.0	78.7	–12.7	66.0
24	12	Veronica Gianmoena	Italy	85.0	84.4	–23.6	60.8
25	9	Annika Malacinski	United States	85.0	85.0	–26.5	58.5
26	16	Sana Azegami	Japan	82.0	79.6	–21.9	57.7
27	24	Daniela Dejori	Italy	75.5	67.8	–13.8	54.0
28	13	Marion Droz Vincent	France	82.0	77.0	–23.4	53.6
29	18	Joanna Kil	Poland	78.0	70.1	–17.7	52.4
30	19	Greta Pinzani	Italy	77.0	65.0	–17.3	47.7
31	17	Kai McKinnon	United States	74.0	55.4	–21.6	33.8
32	6	Anna Senoner	Italy	77.0	65.9	–34.9	31.0
33	1	Karina Kozlova	Ukraine	89.5	94.5	–77.8	16.7
34	4	Tereza Koldovská	Czech Republic	69.5	41.3	–37.8	3.5
35	3	Jolana Hradilová	Czech Republic	67.5	43.4	–43.5	–0.1
36	2	Ella Wilson	United States	68.5	48.7	–53.9	–5.2
