= IL Nansen =

Sports club in Os Municipality, Norway

Idrettslaget Nansen is a Norwegian sports club from Dalsbygda in Os Municipality, founded in 1898.

World-level cross-country skiers Annar Ryen and Therese Johaug have been members of the club.
