= Maria Gerboth =

German Nordic combined skier and ski jumper

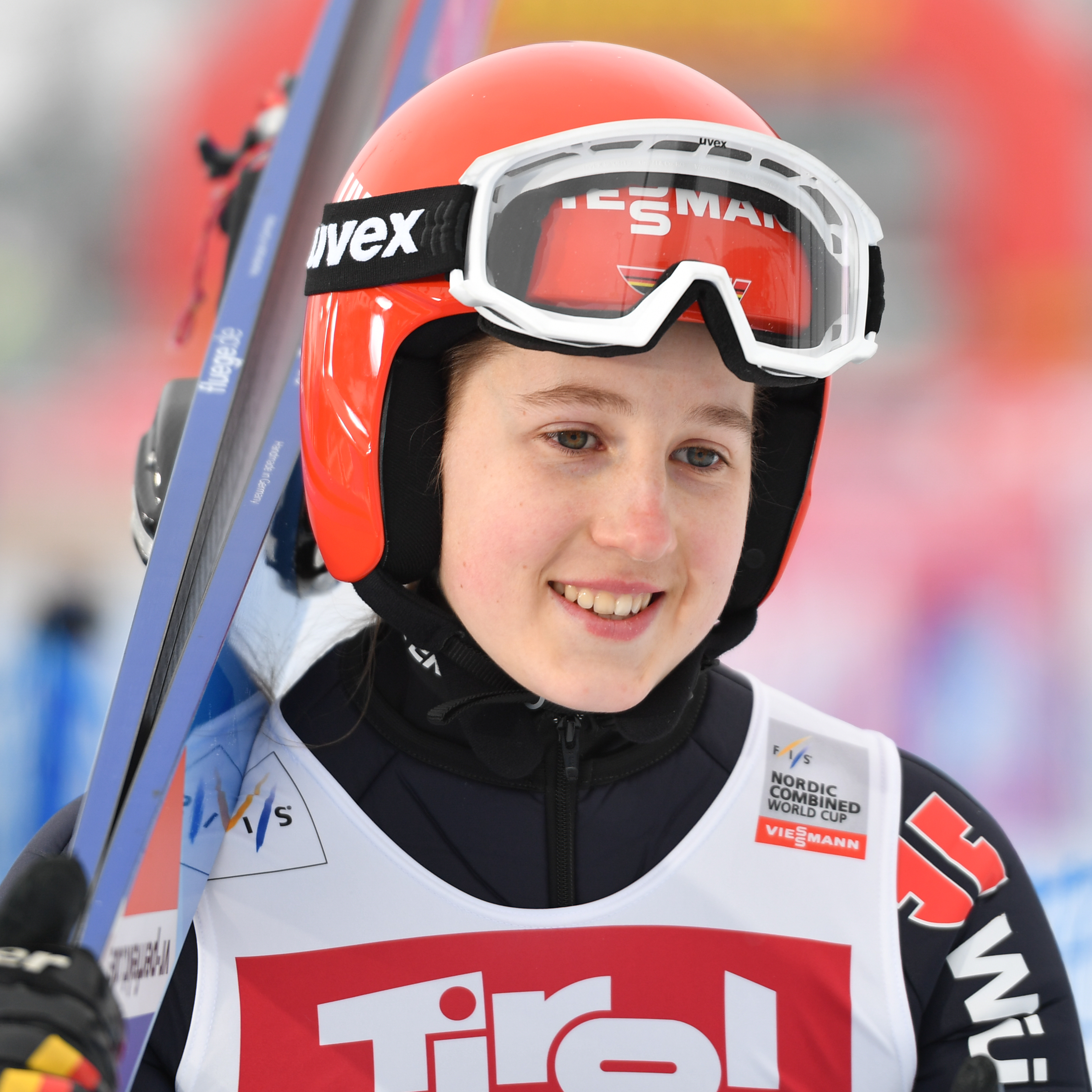

Personal information
- Nationality: Germany
- Born: 19 June 2002 (age 24)
- Height: 1.65 m (5 ft 5 in)

Sport
- Sport: Skiing
- Club: WSF Schmiedefeld

World Cup career
- Seasons: 2021–present
- Indiv. starts: 32

Maria Gerboth (born 19 June 2002) is a German Nordic combined skier and former ski jumper.

She participated at the individual event at the FIS Nordic World Ski Championships 2021.

== Nordic combined results ==
=== World Championships ===
Year	Normal hill	Mass start	Mixed team
2021	19	—N/a	
2023	9	—N/a	—
2025	21	13	—
