= Schonach im Schwarzwald =

- Municipality
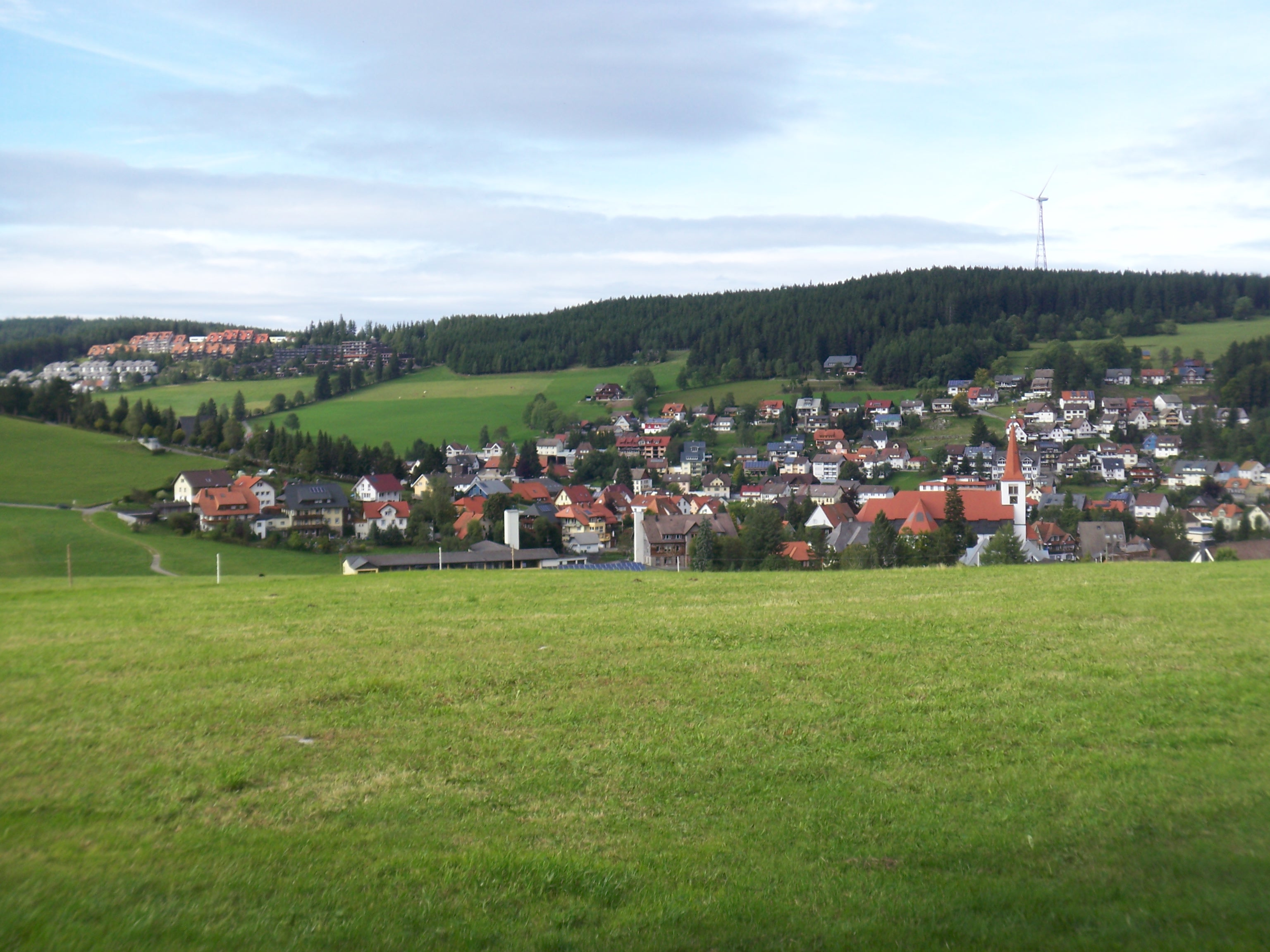
- Schonach seen from the south

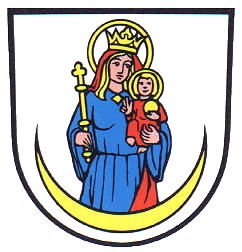
- Coat of arms

- Location of Schonach im Schwarzwald within Schwarzwald-Baar-Kreis district
- Interactive map of Schonach im Schwarzwald
- Location within Germany Location within Baden-Württemberg
- Coordinates: 48°08′33″N 08°12′09″E
- Country: Germany
- State: Baden-Württemberg
- Admin. region: Freiburg
- District: Schwarzwald-Baar-Kreis

Government
  - Mayor (2019–27): Jörg Frey

Area
  - Total: 36.71 km^{2} (14.17 sq mi)
- Elevation: 540–1,155 m (1,772–3,789 ft)

Population (2025-12-31)
  - Total: 3,747
  - Density: 102.1/km^{2} (264.4/sq mi)
- Time zone: UTC+01:00 (CET)
  - Summer (DST): UTC+02:00 (CEST)
- Postal codes: 78136
- Dialling codes: 07722
- Vehicle registration: VS
- Website: www.schonach.de

Schonach im Schwarzwald (German pronunciation: [ˈʃoːnax ʔɪm ˈʃvaʁtsvalt], lit. 'Schönwald in the Black Forest') is a municipality in the district of Schwarzwald-Baar in Baden-Württemberg in Germany.

== Sport ==
Winter sports, especially Nordic combined and cross-country skiing, have a great influence on Schonach. In every year, Schonach is a station of the FIS Nordic Combined World Cup holding the Schwarzwaldpokal. In 1981 and 2002, Schonach hosted the FIS Nordic Junior World Ski Championships.

Famous athletes from Schonach:

- Urban Hettich
- Hans-Peter Pohl
- Christian Dold
- Georg Hettich
- Hansjörg Jäkle
- Alexander Herr

== Sights ==
Notable sights in the city of Schonach include:

- The St. Urban, A Roman Catholic church
- The Langenwaldschanze, a ski jumping hill, home to various championships
- The 1st World Largest Cuckoo Clock

Schonach is part of various hiking trails in the region. Also, the city has the title of a Luftkurort, German for health resort.

== Notable people ==
=== Sons and Daughters of the Community ===
- Urban Hettich (born 1953), Nordic Combiner
- Hansjörg Jäkle (born 1971), ski jumper

=== People who are connected to the place ===
- Hans-Peter Pohl (born 1965), Nordic combiner and Olympic Champion
- Georg Hettich (born 1978), Nordic combiner and Olympic Champion
