= Ramsau am Dachstein =

- Municipality
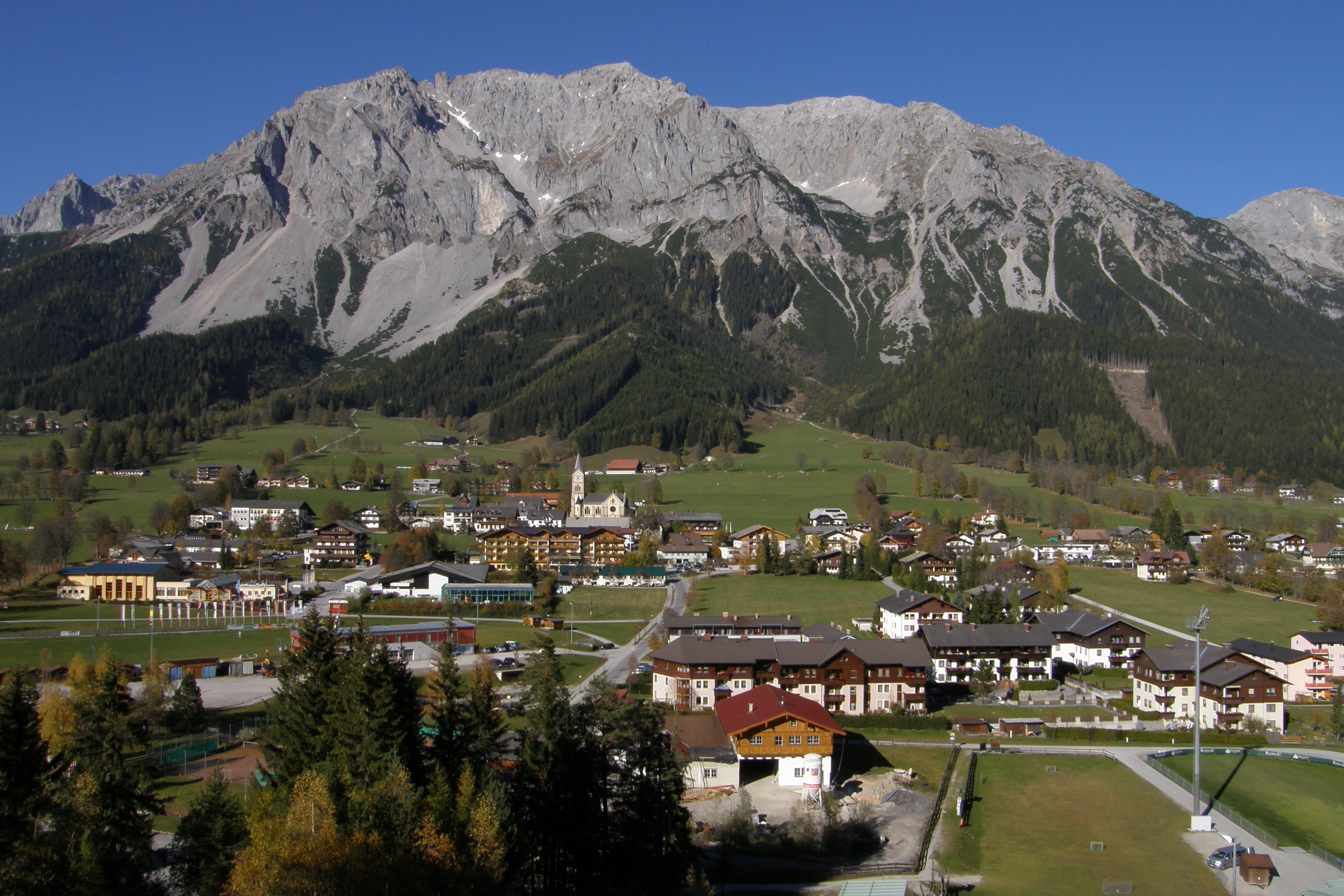
- Panorama of Ramsau with Dachstein range in the background

- Coat of arms

- Location within Austria
- Coordinates: 47°25′N 13°39′E
- Country: Austria
- State: Styria
- District: Liezen

Government
  - Mayor: Ernst Fischbacher

Area
  - Total: 75.75 km^{2} (29.25 sq mi)
- Elevation: 1,135 m (3,724 ft)

Population (2018-01-01)
  - Total: 2,812
  - Density: 37.12/km^{2} (96.15/sq mi)
- Time zone: UTC+1 (CET)
  - Summer (DST): UTC+2 (CEST)
- Postal code: 8972
- Area code: 03687
- Vehicle registration: GB
- Website: www.ramsau.at

Ramsau am Dachstein (Austrian German: [ramˈsaʊ am ˈdaxʃtaɪn]) is a municipality in the district of Liezen, state of Styria, Austria. It is also the name of the elevated plateau between the Dachstein range and the Enns valley on which this municipality is located.

The appendage am Dachstein is added to distinguish the municipality from others of the same name existing in Austria. It is usually omitted in common speech.

== Geography ==
Ramsau am Dachstein is situated between the Dachstein range of mountains in the north and the Enns valley in the south. While the Dachstein range contains peaks up to 2,995 m (9,826 ft) and the towns of the Enns valley, such as Schladming, lie at around 700 m (2,300 ft) above sea level, the Ramsau plateau is a comparatively level piece of land at an elevation of around 1,100 m (3,600 ft). Towards the north, some hills at the foot of the mountain range rise up to 1,700 m (5,600 ft). At approximately 75 km^{2} (29 sq mi), the plateau is an exceptional geological feature in the rugged terrain of the Alps which is more usually characterized by high mountain ranges and narrow valleys.

The municipality of Ramsau am Dachstein is made up of several smaller towns, namely Leiten, Rössing, Ramsau, Schildlehen, Vorberg and Hirzegg. Owing to their position on a plateau, the settlements are more spread out than in a typical Alpine valley. The overall population of the municipality was recorded as 2,701 in the 2001 census.

== History ==
The name Ramsau was first recorded as Ramsowe in a document dated to around 1120 AD. Important landowners during the feudal period and beyond were the abbeys of Admont and St. Peter's. After the events of the Reformation and the Counter-Reformation of the 16th century, the relatively secluded Ramsau emerged as one of the few thoroughly Protestant communities in Austria; something which it remains to this day. As early as the 15th century, the area established a tradition in the manufacture of loden, a thick cloth used in the traditional dress of the wider region. With the advent of commercial tourism in the late 19th century the area gained another steady source of income.

== Tourism and sports ==
Due to its exceptional geography of relatively flat terrain at a high elevation, the Ramsau plateau has developed as a major center for cross-country skiing. Owing to the historically close connection of cross-country skiing and ski jumping (cf. Nordic sports), several ski jumps were erected in the region in the 20th century. The International Ski Federation chose the Nordic venues of Ramsau am Dachstein to be the location of the 1999 FIS Nordic World Ski Championships.

There are also several smaller lifts for Alpine skiing along the hills on the north side of the plateau. In addition, Ramsau hosts the base station of the cable car leading up to the Dachstein glacier. On top of the Dachstein, there is a year-round resort for Alpine skiing, cross-country skiing, and snowboarding.

== Notable people ==
- The Austrian ski mountaineer Andreas Fischbacher was born in Ramsau.
