= Snowboarding at the 2023 Winter World University Games – Women's snowboard cross =

Snowboarding event at the 2023 Winter World University Games

Women's snowboard cross at the Lake Placid 2023 FISU World University Games
- Snowboarding
- Venue: Gore Mountain
- Dates: January 12, 2023 (seeding); January 13, 2023 (elimination round)
- Competitors: 13 from 8 nations

Medalists
1st place, gold medalist(s)		Sophie Hediger	Switzerland
2nd place, silver medalist(s)		Chloé Passerat	France
3rd place, bronze medalist(s)		Kim Martinez	France

The women's snowboard cross competition in snowboarding at the 2023 Winter World University Games was held on January 12 and 13, 2023 at Gore Mountain.

== Results ==
=== Seeding run ===
The seeding run was held on January 12 at 13:00.

Rank	Bib	Name	Country	Time	Notes
1	14	Nienke Poll	Netherlands	58.80	Q
2	9	Sophie Hediger	Switzerland	59.76	Q
3	12	Anna Valentin	France	1:00.22	Q
4	13	Chloé Passerat	France	1:00.35	Q
5	15	Natalie Mullen	Czech Republic	1:01.48	Q
6	16	Woo Su-been	South Korea	1:01.84	Q
7	10	Karen Fujita	Japan	1:02.23	Q
8	17	Clara Chapman	Canada	1:03.06	Q
9	22	Kim Martinez	France	1:03.67	Q
10	18	Paige Hughes	United States	1:05.03	Q
11	20	Bridget MacLean	Canada	1:05.13	Q
12	21	Abigail Benser	United States	1:05.40	Q
13	11	Vendula Burešová	Czech Republic	1:58.24	Q
	19	Alexandra Buchlovičová	Slovakia	Did not start	

=== Round Robin ===
Rank	Name	Country	Heats																				Points	Notes
Rank	Name	Country	1	2	3	4	5	6	7	8	9	10	11	12	13	14	15	16	17	18	19	20	Points	Notes
1	Nienke Poll	Netherlands	4				4				4				4				4				20	Q
2	Sophie Hediger	Switzerland	3					4				4				4				4			19	Q
3	Chloé Passerat	France	2							4				4				4				4	18	Q
4	Woo Su-been	South Korea		4				3			3							3			4		17	Q
5	Anna Valentin	France	1						4				4				4				3		16	Q
6	Bridget MacLean	Canada			4				3		2					3						3	15	Q
7	Karen Fujita	Japan		3					2					3	3					2			13	Q
8	Kim Martinez	France			2		3						3					2		3			13	Q
9	Paige Hughes	United States			3			2						2			3		3				13	
10	Natalie Mullen	Czech Republic		2			2					3					2					2	11	
11	Abigail Benser	United States			1					3		2			2						2		10	
12	Clara Chapman	Canada		1						DNS			DNS			DNS			DNS				1	
	Vendula Borešová	Czech Republic																					DNS	

=== Elimination round ===
==== Semifinals ====
Heat 1

Rank	Bib	Name	Country	Notes
1	8	Kim Martinez	France	Q
2	1	Nienke Poll	Netherlands	Q
3	4	Woo Su-been	South Korea	
4	5	Anna Valentin	France	

Heat 2

Rank	Bib	Name	Country	Notes
1	2	Sophie Hediger	Switzerland	Q
2	3	Chloé Passerat	France	Q
3	7	Karen Fujita	Japan	
4	6	Bridget MacLean	Canada	

==== Finals ====
Small final

Rank	Bib	Name	Country	Notes
5	5	Anna Valentin	France	
6	4	Woo Su-been	South Korea	
7	6	Bridget MacLean	Canada	
8	7	Karen Fujita	Japan	

Big final

Rank	Bib	Name	Country	Notes
1st place, gold medalist(s)	2	Sophie Hediger	Switzerland	
2nd place, silver medalist(s)	3	Chloé Passerat	France	
3rd place, bronze medalist(s)	8	Kim Martinez	France	
4	1	Nienke Poll	Netherlands	
