= Snowboarding at the 2023 Winter World University Games – Men's snowboard cross =

Snowboarding event at the 2023 Winter World University Games

Men's snowboard cross at the Lake Placid 2023 FISU World University Games
- Snowboarding
- Venue: Gore Mountain
- Date: 12 January (seeding); 13 January (elimination round)
- Competitors: 18 from 10 nations

Medalists
1st place, gold medalist(s)		Benjamin Gattaz	France
2nd place, silver medalist(s)		Jakub Žerava	Czech Republic
3rd place, bronze medalist(s)		Leon Beckhaus	Germany

The men's snowboard cross competition in snowboarding at the 2023 Winter World University Games will be held on 12 & 13 January at Gore Mountain.

== Results ==
=== Seeding run ===
The seeding run will be held on 12 January at 13:17.

Rank	Bib	Name	Country	Time	Notes
1	9	Quentin Sodogas	France	54.83	Q
2	22	Titouan Cottret	France	55.10	Q
3	10	Guillaume Herpin	France	55.27	Q
4	11	Leon Beckhaus	Germany	55.43	Q
5	12	Benjamin Gattaz	France	55.47	Q
6	17	Jakub Žerava	Czech Republic	55.71	Q
7	14	Woo Jin	South Korea	55.93	Q
8	15	Bruno Tatarko	Czech Republic	56.40	Q
9	13	Nicola Lubasch	Switzerland	56.49	Q
10	20	Ivan Malovannyi	Ukraine	56.91	Q
11	21	Matouš Šmerák	Czech Republic	57.69	Q
12	16	Seigo Sato	Japan	57.87	Q
13	18	Yuto Tsukahara	Japan	58.50	Q
14	25	Moritz Metzger	Germany	58.51	Q
15	23	Glib Mostovenko	Ukraine	1:00.14	
16	27	Hunter Bernard	United States	1:01.21	
17	19	Joaquín Rodríguez	Argentina	1:03.66	
18	24	Alexandre Cadieux	Canada	1:06.10	
	26	Ganbaataryn Ganzorig	Mongolia	DNS	

Rank	Bib	Name	Country	Notes
1	19	Joaquín Rodríguez	Argentina	Q
2	24	Alexandre Cadieux	Canada	Q
3	23	Glib Mostovenko	Ukraine	
4	27	Hunter Bernard	United States	

=== Round Robin ===
Rank	Name	Country	Heats																				Points	Notes
Rank	Name	Country	1	2	3	4	5	6	7	8	9	10	11	12	13	14	15	16	17	18	19	20	Points	Notes
1	Benjamin Gattaz	France		4			4					4					4					4	20	Q
2	Guillaume Herpin	France	4						4				3				3				4		18	Q
3	Quentin Sodogas	France	2				2				4				4				4				16	Q
4	Leon Beckhaus	Germany	1							4				4				4				3	16	Q
5	Nicola Lubasch	Switzerland			4		3						4					2		2			15	Q
6	Titouan Cottret	France	3					3				3				2				3			14	Q
7	Jakub Žerava	Czech Republic		3				2			3							3			2		13	Q
8	Bruno Tatarko	Czech Republic		2						3			1			4			3				13	Q
9	Seigo Sato	Japan			3					2		2			3						3		13	
10	Woo Jin	South Korea		1					3					3	1					4			12	
11	Ivan Malovannyi	Ukraine			2			4						1			1		2				10	
12	Matouš Šmerák	Czech Republic			1				2		2					3						2	10	
13	Moritz Metzger	Germany				4		1					2		2							1	10	
14	Yuto Tsukahara	Japan				3	1							2		1					1		8	
15	Joaquín Rodríguez	Argentina				2			1			1						1	1				6	
16	Alexandre Cadieux	Canada				1				1	1						2			1			6	

=== Elimination round ===
==== Semifinals ====
Heat 1

Rank	Bib	Name	Country	Notes
1	1	Benjamin Gattaz	France	Q
2	4	Leon Beckhaus	Germany	Q
3	8	Bruno Tatarko	Czech Republic	
4	5	Nicola Lubasch	Switzerland	

Heat 2

Rank	Bib	Name	Country	Notes
1	3	Quentin Sodogas	France	Q
2	7	Jakub Žerava	Czech Republic	Q
3	6	Titouan Cottret	France	
4	2	Guillaume Herpin	France	

==== Finals ====
Small final

Rank	Bib	Name	Country	Notes
5	2	Guillaume Herpin	France	
6	6	Titouan Cottret	France	
7	5	Nicola Lubasch	Switzerland	
8	8	Bruno Tatarko	Czech Republic	DNF

Big final

Rank	Bib	Name	Country	Notes
1st place, gold medalist(s)	1	Benjamin Gattaz	France	
2nd place, silver medalist(s)	7	Jakub Žerava	Czech Republic	
3rd place, bronze medalist(s)	4	Leon Beckhaus	Germany	
4	3	Quentin Sodogas	France	
