= Biathlon at the 2023 Winter World University Games – Women's individual =

Women’s individual at the Lake Placid 2023 FISU World University Games
- Biathlon
- Venue: Lake Placid Olympic Sports Complex Cross Country Biathlon Center
- Date: 14 February
- Competitors: 42 from 14 nations
- Winning time: 43.46.6

Medalists
1st place, gold medalist(s)		Shilo Rousseau	Canada
2nd place, silver medalist(s)		Barbara Skrobiszewska	Poland
3rd place, bronze medalist(s)		Tereza Jandová	Czech Republic

The Women’s individual competition of the 2023 Winter World University Games was held on 14 January, at the Lake Placid Olympic Sports Complex Cross Country Biathlon Center.

== Results ==
The race was started at 14:50.

Rank	Bib	Name	Country	Time	Penalties (P+S+P+S)	Deficit
1st place, gold medalist(s)	9	Shilo Rousseau	Canada	42:52.9	2 (1+0+0+1)	
2nd place, silver medalist(s)	25	Barbara Skrobiszewska	Poland	43.41.3	1 (1+0+0+0)	+48.4
3rd place, bronze medalist(s)	29	Tereza Jandová	Czech Republic	43.46.6	3 (0+2+0+1)	+53.7
4	1	Polina Yegorova	Kazakhstan	45.03.6	2 (0+1+0+1)	+2:10.7
5	13	Yuliia Horodna	Ukraine	45.52.3	3 (1+1+0+1)	+2:59.4
6	15	Anna Nędza-Kubiniec	Poland	45.58.4	4 (1+0+1+2)	+3:05.5
7	28	Pauline Machut	France	46.36.5	1 (1+0+0+0)	+3:43.6
8	6	Kristýna Otcovská	Czech Republic	46.58.1	6 (1+3+1+1)	+4:05.2
9	24	Vibeke Kvistad Dengerud	Norway	46.59.3	0 (0+0+0+0)	+4:06.4
10	5	Anna Blanc	France	47.05.2	4 (1+2+1+0)	+4:12.3
11	3	Anna Perry	Canada	47.14.4	2 (0+1+1+0)	+4:21.5
12	31	Kristina Titiyevskaya	Kazakhstan	47.18.0	5 (1+1+2+1)	+4:25.1
13	7	Vilde Børseth	Norway	47.33.4	1 (0+0+0+1)	+4:40.5
14	10	Arina Kryukova	Kazakhstan	47.39.0	5 (1+1+2+1)	+4:46.1
15	32	Hilda Kukonlehto	Finland	47.49.0	5 (1+1+1+2)	+4:56.1
16	37	Klaudia Topór	Poland	47.57.1	1 (0+1+0+0)	+5:04.2
17	8	Anja Fischer	Switzerland	48.09.0	5 (0+2+2+1)	+5:16.1
18	14	Viktória Vozárová	Slovakia	48.09.8	3 (2+0+0+1)	+5:16.9
19	19	Lenka Bártová	Czech Republic	48.23.4	5 (1+2+0+2)	+5:30.5
20	42	Sanni Oikkonen	Finland	48.33.0	7 (2+3+2+0)	+5:40.1
21	16	Sofia Joronen	Finland	48.33.5	4 (1+2+1+0)	+5:40.6
22	36	Nadezhda Pivovarova	Kazakhstan	48.35.0	4 (0+1+0+3)	+5:42.1
23	35	Veronika Novotná	Czech Republic	49.03.9	6 (2+3+0+1)	+6:11.0
24	30	Cheresa Bouley	United States	49.11.7	6 (2+2+1+1)	+6:18.8
25	18	Sarah Beaulieu	United States	49.12.6	3 (1+0+1+1)	+6:19.7
26	4	Misa Sasaki	Japan	49.22.5	5 (2+0+2+1)	+6:29.6
27	11	Wiktoria Celczyńska	Poland	49.46.8	7 (2+2+1+2)	+6:53.9
28	21	Danika Burke	Canada	49.48.4	3 (0+0+3+0)	+6:55.5
29	40	Ariana Woods	United States	49.50.8	4 (0+2+1+1)	+6:57.9
30	27	Olena Horodna	Ukraine	49.59.7	5 (0+1+1+3)	+7:06.8
31	33	Zoe Pekos	Canada	50.04.6	8 (1+1+2+4)	+7:11.7
32	23	Alina Skripkina	Kazakhstan	50.07.0	6 (1+1+2+2)	+7:14.1
33	43	Dulcie Tanguay	United States	50.13.3	7 (2+2+0+3)	+7:20.4
34	38	Liliia Steblyna	Ukraine	51.45.5	10 (3+3+3+1)	+8:52.6
35	39	Xeniya Dolgopolova	Kazakhstan	52.09.2	4 (1+1+0+2)	+9:16.3
36	17	Chloe Dupont	Great Britain	52.24.9	7 (2+3+1+1)	+9:32.0
37	26	Helen Wilson	United States	52.46.3	9 (3+3+2+1)	+9:53.4
38	41	Isabelle Caza	Canada	53.39.2	5 (3+2+0+0)	+10:46.3
39	34	Cara Pekos	Canada	55.15.3	10 (3+2+1+4)	+12:22.4
40	20	Cara Loates	Great Britain	57.31.3	9 (2+2+4+1)	+14:38.4
41	22	Stela Šavelová	Slovakia	57.56.1	7 (0+4+2+1)	+15:03.2
42	2	Isabella Moon	Australia	1:03:34.6	9 (5+0+4+0)	+20:41.7
	12	Emma Stertz	United States	Did not start		
