= Ukraine at the 2023 Winter World University Games =

- IOC code: UKR
- NOC: Sports Students Union of Ukraine
- Website: osvitasport.org

in Lake Placid, United States 12 January 2023 – 22 January 2023
- Competitors: 58 in 8 sports
- Medals Ranked 18th: Gold 1 Silver 1 Bronze 4 Total 6

Winter Universiade appearances (overview)
- 1993; 1995; 1997; 1999; 2001; 2003; 2005; 2007; 2009; 2011; 2013; 2015; 2017; 2019; 2023; 2025

Ukraine competed at the 2023 Winter World University Games in Lake Placid, United States, from 12 to 22 January 2023.

On 12 July 2022, it was announced that the Ukraine men's national ice hockey team was selected to compete at the Games. It will mark the return of the Ukraine team after the ten-year pause when the team last competed at the 2013 Winter Universiade. Ukraine will not compete in curling.

The national ice hockey team went on a tour in Canada before the Universiade. On 30 December, the Ukrainian team lost 2–0 to the University of Saskatchewan Huskies.

On 28 December 2022, the Committee on the Physical Training and Sports of the Ministry of Youth and Sports of Ukraine announced that the Ukrainian team was expected to be represented by 61 athletes competing in 8 sports: biathlon, alpine skiing, Nordic combined, cross-country skiing, snowboarding, figure skating, ice hockey, and short track speed skating.

== Medalists ==
Medal	Name	Sport	Event	Date
Gold	Mykhailo Kharuk	Snowboarding	Men's parallel giant slalom	21 January
Silver	Dmytro Hrushchak	Biathlon	Men's pursuit	19 January
Bronze	Yuliia Horodna; Stepan Kinash	Biathlon	Single mixed relay	16 January
Bronze	Dmytro Mazurchuk; Vitalii Hrebeniuk	Nordic combined	Men's team sprint normal hill/2 x 4 x 1.5 km	17 January
Bronze	Nadiia Hapatyn	Snowboarding	Women's parallel slalom	22 January
Bronze	Mykhailo Kharuk	Snowboarding	Men's parallel slalom	22 January

Medals by sport
Sport	1st place, gold medalist(s)	2nd place, silver medalist(s)	3rd place, bronze medalist(s)	Total
Snowboarding	1	0	2	3
Biathlon	0	1	1	2
Nordic combined	0	0	1	1

== Competitors ==
The team included three Olympians (Anastasiya Shepilenko, Dmytro Mazurchuk, and Ivan Shmuratko).

Sport	Men	Women	Total
Alpine skiing	1	3	4
Biathlon	4	3	7
Cross-country skiing	5	4	9
Figure skating	2	2	4
Ice hockey	21	—	21
Nordic combined	3	—	3
Short track speed skating	2	2	4
Snowboarding	4	2	6
Total	42	16	58

== Alpine skiing ==
It was announced on 3 January 2022 that Ukraine would be represented by 1 male and 3 female alpine skiers.

Athlete	Event	Run 1		Run 2		Total	
Athlete	Event	Time	Rank	Time	Rank	Time	Rank
Roman Tsybelenko	Men's super-G	—N/a				1:05.80	42
Roman Tsybelenko	Men's сombined	1:02.91	44	50.95	34	1:53.86	34
Roman Tsybelenko	Men's giant slalom	1:10.72	61	1:06.85	34	2:17.57	36
Roman Tsybelenko	Men's slalom	59.90	52	Did not finish			
Anastasiya Shepilenko	Women's super-G	—N/a				53.61	11
Anastasiya Shepilenko	Women's combined	50.73	4	53.34	16	1:44.07	12
Anastasiya Shepilenko	Women's giant slalom	1:05.99	14	1:03.02	2	2:09.01	9
Anastasiya Shepilenko	Women's slalom	Did not finish		Did not advance			
Kateryna Shepilenko	Women's super-G	—N/a				56.62	29
Kateryna Shepilenko	Women's combined	55.93	28	58.05	24	1:53.98	24
Kateryna Shepilenko	Women's giant slalom	Did not finish		Did not advance			
Anastasiia Matsola	Women's giant slalom	1:18.74	62	1:16.50	46	2:35.24	47
Anastasiia Matsola	Women's slalom	1:21.05	38	1:18.26	32	2:39.31	33

== Biathlon ==
It was announced on 2 January 2022 that Ukraine would be represented by 5 male and 3 female biathletes. But later Vitalii Mandzyn was forced to withdraw from the competitions due to pneumonia. Ukraine was represented by four male and three female athletes who won two medals.

Men

Athlete	Event	Time	Misses	Rank
Dmytro Hrushchak	Short individual	47:12.2	6 (2+2+0+2)	15
Dmytro Hrushchak	Sprint	28:38.7	2 (0+2)	7
Dmytro Hrushchak	Pursuit	36:26.3	1 (0+0+0+1)	2nd place, silver medalist(s)
Dmytro Hrushchak	Mass start	42:51.3	5 (1+2+0+2)	14
Stepan Kinash	Short individual	44:43.5	2 (1+0+0+1)	5
Stepan Kinash	Sprint	Did not finish		
Stepan Kinash	Mass start	41:49.6	3 (2+0+1+0)	9
Vladyslav Chykhar	Short individual	48:43.8	6 (1+3+1+1)	21
Vladyslav Chykhar	Sprint	29:07.5	1 (1+0)	11
Vladyslav Chykhar	Pursuit	38:39.2	3 (0+1+1+1)	10
Roman Borovyk	Short individual	48:03.6	7 (1+2+1+3)	20
Roman Borovyk	Sprint	29:20.2	3 (1+2)	14
Roman Borovyk	Pursuit	38:47.6	4 (0+1+3+0)	12
Roman Borovyk	Mass start	44:39.0	6 (1+1+1+3)	21

Women

Athlete	Event	Time	Misses	Rank
Yuliia Horodna	Individual	45.52.3	3 (1+1+0+1)	5
Yuliia Horodna	Sprint	25:25.8	1 (1+0)	8
Yuliia Horodna	Pursuit	34:28.4	3 (1+0+0+2)	6
Yuliia Horodna	Mass start	42:33.8	3 (1+0+0+2)	7
Liliia Steblyna	Individual	51.45.5	10 (3+3+3+1)	34
Liliia Steblyna	Sprint	26:17.8	3 (2+1)	13
Liliia Steblyna	Pursuit	35:34.6	4 (1+0+2+1)	14
Liliia Steblyna	Mass start	41:44.7	2 (0+0+1+1)	4
Olena Horodna	Individual	49.59.7	5 (0+1+1+3)	30
Olena Horodna	Sprint	26:45.6	2 (1+1)	22
Olena Horodna	Pursuit	36:48.7	3 (0+2+0+1)	20

Mixed

Athlete	Event	Time	Misses	Rank
Yuliia Horodna; Stepan Kinash	Single mixed relay	38:07.2	1+11	3rd place, bronze medalist(s)

== Cross-country skiing ==
Ukraine was represented by 9 athletes.

Distance
Men

Athlete	Event	Final result		
Athlete	Event	Time	Deficit	Rank
Ruslan Denysenko	10 km classical	26:06.6	+1:29.6	19
Ruslan Denysenko	10 km pursuit	25:07.4	+2:22.5	18
Ruslan Denysenko	30 km mass start	1:13:24.4	+35.6	11
Dmytro Romanchenko	10 km classical	27:32.3	+2:55.3	55
Dmytro Romanchenko	10 km pursuit	29:07.0	+6:22.1	51
Dmytro Romanchenko	30 km mass start	1:21:52.2	+9:03.4	39
Oleh Mishchenko	10 km classical	28:27.2	+3:50.2	64
Oleh Mishchenko	30 km mass start	1:28:43.9	+15:55.1	47
Oleh Mishchenko	10 km pursuit	29:31.4	+6:46.5	55
Maksym Bondar	10 km classical	28:23.7	+3:46.7	62
Maksym Bondar	10 km pursuit	30:18.9	+7:34.0	60
Maksym Bondar	30 km mass start	1:20:34.1	+7:45.3	36
Oleksii Kyryk	10 km classical	32:06.4	+7:29.4	78
Oleksii Kyryk	10 km pursuit	35:15.6	+12:30.7	72
Ruslan Denysenko; Dmytro Romanchenko; Oleh Mishchenko; Maksym Bondar	4×7.5 km relay	1:24:30.5	+7:29.0	11

Women

Athlete	Event	Final result		
Athlete	Event	Time	Deficit	Rank
Anastasiia Nikon	5 km classical	15:05.3	+1:44.5	38
Anastasiia Nikon	5 km pursuit	15:10.3	+2:42.5	37
Anastasiia Nikon	15 km mass start	44:40.4	+5:02.0	39
Anastasiia Ivanchenko	10 km classical	15:29.9	+2:09.1	48
Anastasiia Ivanchenko	5 km pursuit	15:16.0	+2:48.2	39
Anastasiia Ivanchenko	15 km mass start	42:42.6	+3:04.2	27
Anastasiia Savinska	10 km classical	15:24.9	+2:04.1	46
Anastasiia Savinska	5 km pursuit	16:25.8	+3:58.0	47
Anastasiia Savinska	15 km mass start	46:38.0	+6:59.6	44
Yelizaveta Nopriienko	10 km classical	16:00.6	+2:39.8	53
Yelizaveta Nopriienko	5 km pursuit	16:34.8	+4:07.0	50
Yelizaveta Nopriienko	15 km mass start	44:01.9	+4:23.5	36
Anastasiia Nikon; Yelizaveta Nopriienko; Anastasiia Ivanchenko	3×5 km relay	47:48.6	+3:59.0	11

Sprint

Athlete	Event	Qualification		Quarterfinal		Semifinal		Final	
Athlete	Event	Time	Rank	Time	Rank	Time	Rank	Time	Rank
Dmytro Romanchenko	Men's sprint	2:40.54	56	Did not advance					
Maksym Bondar	Men's sprint	2:42.45	62	Did not advance					
Ruslan Denysenko	Men's sprint	2:42.57	63	Did not advance					
Oleh Mishchenko	Men's sprint	2:43.13	64	Did not advance					
Oleksii Kyryk	Men's sprint	2:46.24	67	Did not advance					
Anastasiia Ivanchenko	Women's sprint	3:13.93	49	Did not advance					
Anastasiia Nikon	Women's sprint	3:14.87	50	Did not advance					
Anastasiia Savinska	Women's sprint	3:20.96	57	Did not advance					
Yelizaveta Nopriienko	Women's sprint	3:25.05	63	Did not advance					

Relay

Athlete	Event	Semifinal		Final	
Athlete	Event	Time	Rank	Time	Rank
Maksym Bondar; Anastasiya Nikon	Mixed team sprint	21:49.31	14	Did not advance	
Dmytro Romanchenko; Anastasiya Ivanchenko	Mixed team sprint	22:53.28	15	Did not advance	

== Figure skating ==
Ivan Shmuratko was scheduled to compete in the men's singles competition but he had to withdraw due to problems with his foot. Ukraine was thus represented in women's singles and ice dancing by one entry.

Athlete	Event	SP		FS		Total	
Athlete	Event	Points	Rank	Points	Rank	Points	Rank
Ivan Shmuratko	Men's singles	Withdrew					
Anastasia Hozhva	Women's singles	57.50	9 Q	95.99	9	153.49	8
Mariia Holubtsova; Kyryl Bielobrov	Ice dance	62.88	5	95.97	5	158.85	5

== Ice hockey ==
Team roster

Head coach: Vadym Shakhraychuk

No.	Pos.	Name	Height	Weight	Birthdate	Team
6	D	Andriy Hryhoryev	181 cm (5 ft 11 in)	77 kg (170 lb)	7 February 1998 (aged 24)	(Ukraine) Sokil Kyiv
7	F	Yaroslav Panchenko	179 cm (5 ft 10 in)	79 kg (174 lb)	13 September 2001 (aged 21)	(Lithuania) Energija/GV Elektrėnai
10	F	Vadym Mazur (C)	178 cm (5 ft 10 in)	75 kg (165 lb)	17 February 1998 (aged 24)	(Ukraine) Sokil Kyiv
21	D	Artem Hrebenyk	181 cm (5 ft 11 in)	83 kg (183 lb)	4 June 2002 (aged 20)	(Ukraine) Dnipro Kherson
23	F	Denys Borodai	187 cm (6 ft 2 in)	84 kg (185 lb)	10 July 2002 (aged 20)	(Ukraine) Dnipro Kherson
3	D	Oleksii Dakhnovskyi	182 cm (6 ft 0 in)	84 kg (185 lb)	2 September 2004 (aged 18)	(United States) Corpus Christi IceRays
4	D	Yevhen Ratyshnyi (A)	196 cm (6 ft 5 in)	92 kg (203 lb)	19 May 2001 (aged 21)	(Ukraine) Dnipro Kherson
11	F	Mykhailo Simchuk (A)	181 cm (5 ft 11 in)	79 kg (174 lb)	6 December 2002 (aged 20)	(Canada) Brooks Bandits
15	F	Artem Mateychenko	171 cm (5 ft 7 in)	68 kg (150 lb)	6 April 2000 (aged 22)	(United States) Manhattanville College
19	F	Hlib Kryvoshapkin	179 cm (5 ft 10 in)	75 kg (165 lb)	10 May 2000 (aged 22)	(Ukraine) HK Kremenchuk
8	F	Bohdan Stupak	175 cm (5 ft 9 in)	75 kg (165 lb)	22 August 1999 (aged 23)	(Austria) Wiener EV
16	D	Ivan Sysak	177 cm (5 ft 10 in)	75 kg (165 lb)	20 January 2001 (aged 21)	(Ukraine) Sokil Kyiv
18	F	Artem Tselohorodtsev	187 cm (6 ft 2 in)	84 kg (185 lb)	9 November 2001 (aged 21)	(Ukraine) Dnipro Kherson
22	D	Andriy Iertukhov	176 cm (5 ft 9 in)	66 kg (146 lb)	14 January 2003 (aged 19)	(United States) Springfield Junior Pics
24	F	Nazar Ruzhnikov	185 cm (6 ft 1 in)	85 kg (187 lb)	6 May 1999 (aged 23)	(Lithuania) Energija/GV Elektrėnai
9	F	Hlib Varava	183 cm (6 ft 0 in)	88 kg (194 lb)	19 April 2002 (aged 20)	(Ukraine) HK Kremenchuk
12	D	Arsen Paliichuk	193 cm (6 ft 4 in)	88 kg (194 lb)	28 December 2003 (aged 19)	(United States) Danbury Jr. Hat Tricks
13	F	Mykhailo Chykantsev	191 cm (6 ft 3 in)	80 kg (180 lb)	28 August 2001 (aged 21)	(Slovakia) MŠK Púchov U20
14	F	Artem Hrabovetskyi	183 cm (6 ft 0 in)	82 kg (181 lb)	21 August 2003 (aged 19)	(Czech Republic) HC Sparta Praha U20
1	GK	Dmytro Kubrytskyi	184 cm (6 ft 0 in)	81 kg (179 lb)	20 July 2002 (aged 20)	(Canada) Dauphin Kings
20	GK	Bohdan Diachenko	182 cm (6 ft 0 in)	83 kg (183 lb)	6 October 1998 (aged 24)	(Ukraine) HC Kharkiv Berserks

Summary

Team	Event	Group stage						Semi-final	Final / BM	
Team	Event	Opposition Score	Opposition Score	Opposition Score	Opposition Score	Opposition Score	Rank	Opposition Score	Opposition Score	Rank
Ukraine men's team	Men's tournament	Canada; L 1-6	Latvia; L 2-3 OT	Sweden; W 12-2	Japan; L 2-4	Czech Republic; W 3-1	3	Did not advance		

== Nordic combined ==
Dmytro Mazurchuk and Vitalii Hrebeniuk won the first-ever medal for Ukraine in the sport at the Winter Universiades.

Men

Athlete	Event	Ski jumping			Cross-country		Total	
Athlete	Event	Distance	Points	Rank	Time	Rank	Time/Points	Rank
Dmytro Mazurchuk	Men's normal hill/10 km	89.5	102.0	6	24:15.5	3	26:41.5	5
Vitalii Hrebeniuk	Men's normal hill/10 km	88.5	103.2	5	24:33.5	6	26:55.5	6
Oleksandr Shumbarets	Men's normal hill/10 km	70.0	62.4	16	25:20.1	12	30:25.1	14
Dmytro Mazurchuk	Men's mass start 10 km/normal hill	88.0	110.4	5	26:37.2	10	80.4	7
Vitalii Hrebeniuk	Men's mass start 10 km/normal hill	82.0	103.2	6	25:57.2	7	83.2	6
Oleksandr Shumbarets	Men's mass start 10 km/normal hill	74.5	86.1	11	28:50.2	16	22.8	15
Dmytro Mazurchuk; Vitalii Hrebeniuk	Men's team sprint normal hill/2 x 4 x 1.5 km	211.1		3	25:00.2	4	25:33.2	3rd place, bronze medalist(s)

== Short track speed skating ==
Ukraine was represented by 4 athletes.

Men

Athlete	Event	Prel. Heat		Heat		Quarterfinal		Semifinal		Final	
Athlete	Event	Time	Rank	Time	Rank	Time	Rank	Time	Rank	Time	Rank
Yaroslav Morozov	500 m	59.046	5	Did not advance							
Yaroslav Morozov	1000 m	1:32.728	3 q	1:56.309	5	Did not advance					
Yaroslav Morozov	1500 m	—N/a				2:27.946	5	Did not advance			
Rostyslav Leontenko	500 m	42.776	3 q	43.644	4	Did not advance					
Rostyslav Leontenko	1000 m	1:47.992	5	Did not advance							
Rostyslav Leontenko	1500 m	—N/a				2:33.819	5	Did not advance			

Women

Athlete	Event	Heat		Quarterfinal		Semifinal		Final	
Athlete	Event	Time	Rank	Time	Rank	Time	Rank	Time	Rank
Tetiana Zarvanska	500 m	49.331	5	Did not advance					
Tetiana Zarvanska	1000 m	1:37.716	5	Did not advance					
Tetiana Zarvanska	1500 m	—N/a		2:57.147	5	Did not advance			
Viktoriia Chervenko	500 m	50.149	5	Did not advance					
Viktoriia Chervenko	1000 m	1:45.233	5	Did not advance					
Viktoriia Chervenko	1500 m	—N/a		2:58.982	5	Did not advance			

Mixed

Athlete	Event	Quarterfinal		Semifinal		Final	
Athlete	Event	Time	Rank	Time	Rank	Time	Rank
Viktoriia Chervenko; Tetiana Zarvanska; Rostyslav Leontenko; Yaroslav Morozov	Mixed team relay	3:11.732	4	Did not advance			

== Snowboarding ==
Mykhailo Kharuk became the first Ukrainian Universiade champion in snowboarding. In total, Ukraine won three medals in snowboarding.

Snowboard cross

Athlete	Event	Seeding 1		Seeding 2	Elimination		Semifinal	Final	
Athlete	Event	Time	Rank	Position	Points	Position	Position	Position	Rank
Ivan Malovannyi	Men's	56.91	10 Q	Bye	10	11	Did not advance		
Hlib Mostovenko	Men's	1:00.14	15	3	Did not advance				

Parallel

Athlete	Event	Qualification		Round of 16	Quarterfinal	Semifinal	Final	
Athlete	Event	Time	Rank	Opposition Time	Opposition Time	Opposition Time	Opposition Time	Rank
Mykhailo Kharuk	Men's parallel giant slalom	59.89	1 Q	(Poland) Majerczyk; W	(South Korea) Cho; W	(South Korea) Hong; W	(Austria) Pink; W	1st place, gold medalist(s)
Mykhailo Kharuk	Men's parallel slalom	1:06.25	1 Q	(Austria) Skoff; W	(Czech Republic) Pocinek; W	(Austria) Burgstaller; L +0.39	(Japan) Shinohara; W	3rd place, bronze medalist(s)
Vasyl Kasheliuk	Men's parallel giant slalom	1:01.73	6 Q	(Canada) Farber; W	(Austria) Pink; L +0.53	Did not advance		
Vasyl Kasheliuk	Men's parallel slalom	1:09.18	6 Q	(Japan) Yogo; W	(Japan) Shinohara; L +0.43	Did not advance		
Nadiia Hapatyn	Women's parallel giant slalom	1:04.41	3 Q	(Japan) Kanazawa; L +0.26	Did not advance			
Nadiia Hapatyn	Women's parallel slalom	1:12.91	5 Q	(Switzerland) Kleesattel; W	(Switzerland) Hauser; W	(Austria) Kainz; L +0.17	(Italy) Fava; W	3rd place, bronze medalist(s)
Vita Bodnaruk	Women's parallel giant slalom	1:04.98	9 Q	(Switzerland) Hauser; W	(Japan) Murata; W	(Italy) Fava; L +1.19	(Switzerland) Bätschi; L +0.79	4
Vita Bodnaruk	Women's parallel slalom	1:14.89	7 Q	(South Korea) Jang; W	(Switzerland) Bätschi; L +1.17	Did not advance		
