= Alpine skiing at the 2023 Winter World University Games – Men's super-G =

Men's super-G at the Lake Placid 2023 FISU World University Games
- Alpine skiing
- Venue: Whiteface Mountain
- Date: 14 January
- Competitors: 49 from 16 nations
- Winning time: 58.35

Medalists
1st place, gold medalist(s)		Jan Zabystřan	Czech Republic
2nd place, silver medalist(s)		Luca Taranzano	Italy
3rd place, bronze medalist(s)		Eric Wyler	Switzerland

The men's super-G competition of the Alpine skiing at the 2023 Winter World University Games was scheduled to be held on 13 January 2023 on Whiteface Mountain, due to adverse weather it was postponed to 14 January.

== Results ==
The race was started at 10:00 (UTC–5).

Rank	Bib	Name	Country	Time	Behind
1st place, gold medalist(s)	13	Jan Zabystřan	Czech Republic	58.35	
2nd place, silver medalist(s)	14	Luca Taranzano	Italy	58.76	+0.41
3rd place, bronze medalist(s)	15	Eric Wyler	Switzerland	58.77	+0.42
4	24	Andrej Drukarov	Lithuania	58.90	+0.55
5	5	Albert Ortega	Spain	59.07	+0.72
5	11	Tanner Perkins	United States	59.07	+0.72
7	8	Loïc Chable	Switzerland	59.13	+0.78
8	6	Andri Moser	Switzerland	59.39	+1.04
9	22	Gianluca Böhm	Switzerland	59.41	+1.06
10	4	Tomáš Klinský	Czech Republic	59.49	+1.14
10	12	Caeden Carruthers	Canada	59.49	+1.14
12	20	Jacob Dilling	United States	59.84	+1.49
13	7	David Kubeš	Czech Republic	59.96	+1.61
14	28	Jeremie Lagier	France	59.97	+1.62
15	23	Ján Sanitrár	Slovakia	59.99	+1.64
16	27	Christoph Pöll	Austria	1:00.00	+1.65
17	16	Jeremy Mathers	United States	1:00.02	+1.67
18	1	Yanick Mani	Switzerland	1:00.05	+1.70
19	31	Emil Keranen	Finland	1:00.20	+1.85
20	42	Dawson Yates	Canada	1:00.25	+1.90
21	33	Stefano Cordone	Italy	1:00.33	+1.98
22	30	Simon Nantschev	Germany	1:00.37	+2.02
23	18	Aidan Marler	Canada	1:00.38	+2.03
24	35	David Hrovath	Austria	1:00.43	+2.08
25	25	Ondřej Surkoš	Czech Republic	1:00.56	+2.21
26	2	Spencer Wright	United States	1:00.58	+2.23
27	40	Max Paget	France	1:00.72	+2.37
28	44	Jinro Kirikubo	Japan	1:00.81	+2.46
29	34	Pierre-Elliot Poitras	Canada	1:00.84	+2.49
30	3	Thomas Dalla Libera	Italy	1:00.98	+2.63
31	17	Adam Klima	Czech Republic	1:01.06	+2.71
32	26	Jack Reich	United States	1:01.19	+2.84
33	46	Jonas Sánchez Cabanas	Spain	1:01.22	+2.87
34	41	Valentin Lotter	Austria	1:01.27	+2.92
35	21	Hunter Eid	United States	1:01.32	+2.97
36	39	Oscar Holmqvist	Sweden	1:01.77	+3.42
37	47	Takayuki Koyama	Japan	1:01.90	+3.55
38	36	Jeppe Holm Raggan	Denmark	1:02.15	+3.80
39	48	Jan Ronner	Austria	1:02.24	+3.89
40	49	Rion Takeuchi	Japan	1:02.55	+4.20
41	38	Colin Kress	Canada	1:03.54	+5.19
42	43	Roman Tsybelenko	Ukraine	1:05.80	+7.45
	9	Luca Resinelli	Italy	DNF	
	10	Giovanni Zazzaro	Italy	DNF	
	19	Federico Toscano	Switzerland	DNF	
	29	Niklas Järvikare	Finland	DNF	
	32	Davide Damanti	Italy	DNF	
	37	Eduard Fiala	Czech Republic	DNF	
	45	Ulysse Cretin	France	DNF	
