= Freestyle skiing at the 2023 Winter World University Games =

Freestyle skiing at the Lake Placid 2023 FISU World University Games
- Venue: Gore Mountain
- Dates: 15–20 January 2023

Freestyle skiing at the 2023 Winter World University Games was held at Gore Mountain from 15 to 20 January 2023.

== Men's events ==
Event	Gold		Silver		Bronze	
Big air	Jakob Gessner; Germany	182.50	Paul Vieuxtemps; Thailand	172.25	Vojtěch Břeský; Czech Republic	158.00
Slopestyle	Rai Kasamura; Japan	97.75	Manatsu Sato; Japan	93.50	Paul Vieuxtemps; Thailand	93.25
Ski cross	Scott Johns; Great Britain		Tim-Ole Mietz; Germany		Niklas Illig; Germany	

== Women's events ==
Event	Gold		Silver		Bronze	
Big air	Yuna Koga; Japan	172.75	Michelle Rageth; Switzerland	169.25	Viivi Paljärvi; Finland	160.25
Slopestyle	Yuna Koga; Japan	94.75	Michelle Rageth; Switzerland	92.25	Thea Fenwick; Great Britain	74.00
Ski cross	Lin Nakanishi; Japan		Nikola Fričová; Slovakia		Elizabeth Filiatrault; Canada	

== Medal table ==
Rank	Nation	Gold	Silver	Bronze	Total
1	Japan	4	1	0	5
2	Germany	1	1	1	3
3	Great Britain	1	0	1	2
4	Switzerland	0	2	0	2
5	Thailand	0	1	1	2
6	Slovakia	0	1	0	1
7	Canada	0	0	1	1
7	Czech Republic	0	0	1	1
7	Finland	0	0	1	1
Totals (9 entries)		6	6	6	18

== Participating nations ==
- Australia (1)
- Austria (2)
- Brazil (1)
- Canada (4)
- Czech Republic (3)
- Finland (1)
- Germany (3)
- Great Britain (5)
- Japan (4)
- Slovakia (3)
- South Korea (1)
- Switzerland (3)
- Thailand (1)
- United States (1)
