= Czech Republic at the 2023 Winter World University Games =

- Flag of Czech Republic
- IOC code: CZE

in Lake Placid 12 January 2023 – 22 January 2023
- Competitors: 93 in 12 sports
- Flag bearer: Tomáš Klinský
- Medals Ranked 6th: Gold 5 Silver 1 Bronze 6 Total 12

The Czech Republic competed at the 2023 Winter World University Games in Lake Placid, from January 12 to January 22, 2023. This was the Czech Republic's sixteenth appearance at the FISU Winter World University Games, having competed at every Games since the dissolution of Czechoslovakia in 1993.

The team won 12 medals, the best result at the FISU Winter World University Games since 2013 and twice the number of the previous games in Krasnoyarsk.

== Competitors ==
The following is the list of number of competitors (per gender) participating at the games per sport/discipline.

Sport	Men	Women	Total
Alpine skiing	6	2	8
Biathlon	4	4	8
Cross-country skiing	4	3	7
Curling	5	0	5
Figure skating	1	1	2
Freestyle skiing	2	1	3
Ice hockey	23	23	46
Nordic combined	1	0	1
Short track speed skating	1	1	2
Ski jumping	1	0	1
Snowboarding	5	3	8
Speed skating	0	2	2
Total	53	40	93

== Medalists ==
Medal	Name	Sport	Event	Date
Gold	Jan Zabystřan	Alpine Skiing	Men's super-G	14 January
Gold	Tereza Jandová; Jakub Kocián	Biathlon	Single mixed relay	16 January
Gold	Jan Zabystřan	Alpine Skiing	Men's giant slalom	18 January
Gold	Jan Zabystřan	Alpine Skiing	Men's slalom	21 January
Gold	Kristýna Otcovská	Biathlon	Women's mass start	21 January
Silver	Jakub Žerava	Snowboarding	Men's snowboard cross	13 January
Bronze	Veronika Antošová	Speed skating	Women's 1500 m	13 January
Bronze	Tereza Jandová	Biathlon	Women's short individual	14 January
Bronze	Jan Zabystřan	Alpine Skiing	Men's combined	16 January
Bronze	Tereza Jandová	Biathlon	Women's sprint	18 January
Bronze	Vojtěch Břeský	Freestyle skiing	Men's big air	20 January
Bronze	Women's ice hockey team	Ice hockey	Women	21 January

== Alpine skiing ==
In alpine skiing, the Czech team recorded four medals, including three golds, thanks to Jan Zabystřan, who tied for fourth place among the multi-medalists of the games.

Men

Athlete	Event	Run 1		Run 2		Total	
Athlete	Event	Time	Rank	Time	Rank	Time	Rank
Jan Zabystřan	Super-G	—N/a				58.35	1st place, gold medalist(s)
Jan Zabystřan	Combined	56.82	1	46.56	10	1:43.38	3rd place, bronze medalist(s)
Jan Zabystřan	Giant Slalom	59.86	1	1:01.37	2	2:01.23	1st place, gold medalist(s)
Jan Zabystřan	Slalom	53.27	3	58.11	2	1:51.38	1st place, gold medalist(s)
Tomáš Klinský	Super-G	—N/a				59.49	10
Tomáš Klinský	Combined	58.06	14	48.51	30	1:46.57	22
Tomáš Klinský	Giant Slalom	DNF		—N/a		DNF	
Tomáš Klinský	Slalom	DNS		—N/a		DNS	
David Kubeš	Super-G	—N/a				59.96	13
David Kubeš	Combined	DNF		—N/a		DNF	
David Kubeš	Giant Slalom	1:03.18	32	DNF		DNF	
David Kubeš	Slalom	DNF		—N/a		DNF	
Ondřej Surkoš	Super-G	—N/a				1:00.56	25
Ondřej Surkoš	Combined	DNF		—N/a		DNF	
Ondřej Surkoš	Giant Slalom	1:02.90	28	DNF		DNF	
Ondřej Surkoš	Slalom	DNF		—N/a		DNF	
Adam Klíma	Super-G	—N/a				1:01.06	31
Adam Klíma	Combined	58.57	19	DNF		DNF	
Adam Klíma	Slalom	DNF		—N/a		DNF	
Eduard Fiala	Super-G	—N/a				DNF	
Eduard Fiala	Combined	1:00.18	42	47.82	25	1:48.00	30
Eduard Fiala	Giant Slalom	1:05.08	51	1:06.58	31	2:11.66	31
Eduard Fiala	Slalom	56.30	39	DNF		DNF	

Women

Athlete	Event	Run 1		Run 2		Total	
Athlete	Event	Time	Rank	Time	Rank	Time	Rank
Klára Gašparíková	Super-G	—N/a				53.31	8
Klára Gašparíková	Giant Slalom	1:07.14	26	1:03.40	6	2:10.54	23
Klára Gašparíková	Slalom	DNF		—N/a		DNF	
Aneta Vetrová	Super-G	—N/a				55.20	23
Aneta Vetrová	Giant Slalom	DNF		—N/a		DNF	

Mixed

Athlete	Event	Quarterfinals	Semifinals	Final / BM
Athlete	Event	Opposition Result		Rank
Jan Zabystřan; Ondřej Surkoš; Klára Gašparíková second woman not entered	Mixed team parallel	United States; L 2–2	Did not advance	9

== Biathlon ==
Tereza Jandová, Kristýna Otcovská and Jakub Kocián added four medals together to the tally of the Czech team.

Men

Athlete	Event	Time	Misses	Rank
Jakub Kocián	Short individual	44:08.7	1 (0+0+0+1)	4
Jakub Kocián	Sprint	29:11.8	2 (0+2)	13
Jakub Kocián	Pursuit	37:31.4	2 (0+0+2+0)	7
Jakub Kocián	Mass start	43:49.0	0 (0+0+0+0)	18
Jakub Kabrda	Short individual	47:08.2	6 (2+2+2+0)	14
Jakub Kabrda	Sprint	28.47.1	3 (1+2)	9
Jakub Kabrda	Pursuit	38:47.6	6 (3+0+2+1)	11
Jakub Kabrda	Mass start	43:08.3	6 (1+2+2+1)	15
Michal Zaoral	Short individual	48:45.6	5 (0+3+0+2)	22
Michal Zaoral	Sprint	30:39.4	5 (2+3)	20
Michal Zaoral	Pursuit	42:13.4	4 (1+1+1+1)	21
Michal Zaoral	Mass start	42:33.9	2 (0+1+0+1)	13
Luděk Abraham	Sprint	29:22.8	3 (0+3)	15
Luděk Abraham	Pursuit	40:21.5	7 (4+1+2+0)	19
Luděk Abraham	Mass start	40:53.7	3 (1+0+0+2)	5

Women

Athlete	Event	Time	Misses	Rank
Tereza Jandová	Short individual	43:46.6	3 (0+2+0+1)	3rd place, bronze medalist(s)
Tereza Jandová	Sprint	25:01.3	2 (0+2)	3rd place, bronze medalist(s)
Tereza Jandová	Pursuit	DNS		
Tereza Jandová	Mass start	DNS		
Kristýna Otcovská	Short individual	46:58.1	6 (1+3+1+1)	8
Kristýna Otcovská	Sprint	25:21.9	3 (2+1)	6
Kristýna Otcovská	Pursuit	33:41.9	6 (0+1+3+2)	4
Kristýna Otcovská	Mass start	41:11.6	3 (3+0+0+0)	1st place, gold medalist(s)
Lenka Bártová	Short individual	48:23.4	5 (1+2+0+2)	19
Lenka Bártová	Sprint	26:34.1	3 (0+3)	18
Lenka Bártová	Pursuit	34:57.6	1 (0+1+0+0)	9
Lenka Bártová	Mass start	42:52.2	3 (0+0+1+2)	9
Veronika Novotná	Short individual	49:03.9	6 (2+3+0+1)	23
Veronika Novotná	Sprint	25:55.8	3 (0+3)	10
Veronika Novotná	Pursuit	35:04.3	4 (2+1+1+0)	12
Veronika Novotná	Mass start	42:41.1	3 (0+0+2+1)	8

Mixed

Athletes	Event	Time	Misses	Rank
Tereza Jandová, Jakub Kocián	Single mixed relay	37:25.3	0+3	1st place, gold medalist(s)

== Cross-country skiing ==
Cross country skiers finished several times close to the medal standings, especially in the men's relay.

Men

Athlete	Event	Qualification		Quarterfinal		Semifinal		Final	
Athlete	Event	Time	Rank	Time	Rank	Time	Rank	Time	Rank
Tomáš Dufek	10 km classical	—N/a						25:13.6	5
Tomáš Dufek	10 km free pursuit	—N/a						48:31.0	6
Tomáš Dufek	Sprint freestyle	3:09.86	21	4:13.12	6	Did not advance			28
Kryštof Zatloukal	10 km classical	—N/a						25:51.8	16
Kryštof Zatloukal	10 km free pursuit	—N/a						48:44.2	9
Kryštof Zatloukal	Sprint freestyle	3:11.84	25	3:12.76	4	Did not advance			19
Kryštof Zatloukal	30 km free mass start	—N/a						DNF	
Tomáš Lukeš	10 km classical	—N/a						26:24.2	30
Tomáš Lukeš	10 km free pursuit	—N/a						49:22.8	15
Tomáš Lukeš	Sprint freestyle	2:33.15	33	Did not advance					33
Daniel Hozák	10 km classical	—N/a						27:05.8	46
Daniel Hozák	10 km free pursuit	—N/a						51:30.4	43
Daniel Hozák	Sprint freestyle	2:35.29	40	Did not advance					40
Daniel Hozák	30 km free mass start	—N/a						1:21:20.5	37
Kryštof Zatloukal; Tomáš Dufek; Daniel Hozák; Tomáš Lukeš	4×7.5 km relay	—N/a						1:18:14.2	4

Women

Athlete	Event	Qualification		Quarterfinal		Semifinal		Final	
Athlete	Event	Time	Rank	Time	Rank	Time	Rank	Time	Rank
Pavlína Votočková	5 km classical	—N/a						14:23.1	15
Pavlína Votočková	5 km free pursuit	—N/a						26:55.0	9
Pavlína Votočková	Sprint freestyle	2:57.66	15	3:00.13	3	did not advance			14
Pavlína Votočková	15 km free mass start	—N/a						DNF	
Adéla Nováková	5 km classical	—N/a						14:32.8	20
Adéla Nováková	5 km free pursuit	—N/a						27:06.4	13
Adéla Nováková	Sprint freestyle	2:55.56	10	2:57.41	2	3:00.49	6	DNA	11
Adéla Nováková	15 km free mass start	—N/a						41:19.1	11
Barbora Antošová	Sprint freestyle	2:53.04	4	2:57.51	2	3:00.39	5	DNA	9
Barbora Antošová; Pavlína Votočková; Adéla Nováková	3×5 km relay	—N/a						45:29.5	8

Mixed

Athlete	Event	Semifinal		Final	
Athlete	Event	Time	Rank	Time	Rank
Kryštof Zatloukal; Adéla Nováková	Mixed team sprint classic	21:05.74	3	DNS	
Tomáš Dufek; Barbora Antošová	Mixed team sprint classic	20:46.80	8	21:56.95	10

== Curling ==
After a good start beating Brazil, the Czech men failed to win any other game and finished ninth.

Summary

Team	Event	Group Stage										Semifinal	Final / BM
Team	Event	Opposition Score									Rank	Opposition Score	Rank
David Jakl; Marek Bříza; David Škácha; Aleš Hercok; David Verner	Men	Brazil; W 6–3	Canada; L 1–8	Great Britain; L 6–7	Sweden; L 7–9	United States; L 4–8	Switzerland; L 3–8	South Korea; L 3–6	Norway; L 6–8	Japan; L 4–9	9	Did not advance	9

== Figure skating ==
Two Czech figure skaters participated in Lake Placid, both advancing to the free skating.

Athletes	Event	SP		FS		Total	
Athletes	Event	Points	Rank	Points	Rank	Points	Rank
Petr Kotlařík	Men	57.52	22	101.44	21	158.96	21
Nikola Rychtaříková	Women	46.34	20	79.19	19	125.53	19

== Freestyle skiing ==
After finishing without medals in the slopestyle final, both Jan Ferbr and Vojtěch Břeský advanced to the finals of the big air event. Břeský performed a double cork 1080 and a switch 1080 and won bronze medal, with Ferbr finishing fifth. Klára Kašparová, one of the three athletes from the Brno University of Technology at the games, finished fourth as she failed to start well and did not find a way to pass Canada's Elizabeth Anne Filiatrault.

Ski cross

Athlete	Event	Qualification		Panel heats			Semifinal	Final	Final rank
Athlete	Event	Time	Rank	Heat ranks	Points	Rank	Position	Position	Final rank
Klára Kašparová	Women's ski cross	2:05.27	6	3 – 1 – 2 – 2	8	5	2	4	4

Halfpipe, Slopestyle & Big Air

Athlete	Event	Qualification				Final				
Athlete	Event	Run 1	Run 2	Best	Rank	Run 1	Run 2	Run 3	Total	Rank
Vojtěch Břeský	Men's big air	~~72.50~~	79.75	79.75	6	84.00	74.00	~~50.50~~	158.00	3rd place, bronze medalist(s)
Vojtěch Břeský	Men's slopestyle	~~77.50~~	88.50	88.50	4	~~62.00~~	84.00	—N/a	84.00	6
Jan Ferbr	Men's big air	77.00	~~72.25~~	77.00	7	60.50	68.50	~~46.50~~	129.00	5
Jan Ferbr	Men's slopestyle	~~51.75~~	74.75	74.75	9	~~58.00~~	68.75	—N/a	68.75	9

== Ice hockey ==
The bronze for the Czech women was the first FISU World University Games ice hockey medal for Czechia in 18 years. The men's team was close to the semifinals after winning the first three games, but defeats to Canada and Ukraine at the end of the group stopped them.

=== Men's tournament ===
Team	Event	Group stage						Semifinal	Final
Team	Event	Opposition Score					Rank	Opposition Score	Rank
Czech Republic men's team	Men	Sweden; W 7–2	Japan; W 5–1	Latvia; L 3–4 GWS	Canada; L 0–4	Ukraine; L 1–3	4	did not advance	7

Roster

- Goalkeepers: 1 Daniel Vacek, 2 Marek Štipčák, 3 Michal Kořének
- Defenders: 6 Patrik Vašíček, 9 Tomáš Hajič, 10 Štěpán Kučera, 14 Dominik Ficek, 21 Ondřej Baláž, 22 Tomáš Duda, 27 Jakub Kynčl, 29 Tomáš Hanák
- Forwards: 4 Matěj Novák, 8 Josef Hasman, 12 Patrik Tarnoczy, 13 Tomáš Pšenička, 15 Lukáš Prášek, 17 Štěpán Turek, 18 Vojtěch Komárek, 19 Matěj Mach, 20 Dominik Arnošt, 24 Milan Dančišin, 25 Jakub Wojnar, 26 Tomáš Koblížek
- Coach: Ondřej Kališ

=== Women's tournament ===
Team	Event	Group stage						Semifinal	Final / BR	
Team	Event	Opposition Score					Rank	Opposition Score		Rank
Czech Republic women's team	Women	Great Britain; W 13–0	United States; L 2–8	Canada; L 1–5	Japan; W 3–1	Slovakia; W 2–1	2	Japan; L 0–3	Slovakia; W 3–1	3rd place, bronze medalist(s)

Roster

- Goalkeepers: 1 Kristýna Bláhová, 29 Denisa Jandová, 30 Kateřina Zechovská
- Defenders: 3 Klára Jandušíková, 4 Daniela Pejšová, 7 Denisa Habartová, 14 Barbora Hrůšová, 21 Karolína Kosinová, 23 Zuzana Martinů, 24 Adéla Jůzková, 26 Adéla Hanzlíková, 28 Viktorie Chladová
- Forwards: 5 Tereza Mazancová, 6 Alexandra Halounová, 8 Barbora Patočková, 12 Patricie Škorpíková, 13 Martina Mašková, 16 Martina Exnerová, 17 Kateřina Petřeková, 18 Tereza Topolská, 20 Sandra Halounová, 25 Kristýna Pátková
- Coach: Jakub Peslar

== Nordic combined ==
In Nordic combined, Matěj Fardhons started the first race with a great ski jumping round. Behind Japan's Sakutaro Kobayashi, who was by far unbeatable in Lake Placid, he was in third place, but in the cross country he fell down to the seventh place. In the second race, Fadrhons did not finish the mass start cross country round.

Individual

Athlete	Event	Ski jumping				Cross-country		Ski jumping			Total	
Athlete	Event	Distance	Points	Rank	Deficit	Time	Rank	Distance	Points	Rank	Total Points	Rank
Matěj Fadrhons	Men's individual Gundersen normal hill/10 km	88.0	106.3	3	+2:09	24:54.4	10	—N/a				7
Matěj Fadrhons	Men's individual mass start 10 km/normal hill	—N/a				DNF		DNS			DNF	

== Short track speed skating ==
With two athletes, both recovering from medical issues, Czech team did not record prominent results in short track speed skating.

Men

Athlete	Event	Heats		Heats		Quarterfinal		Semifinal		Final	
Athlete	Event	Time	Rank	Time	Time	Time	Rank	Time	Rank	Time	Rank
Radek Fajkus	500 m	42.317	1	42.227	3	42.008	5	Did not advance			19
Radek Fajkus	1000 m	1:29.859	4	Did not advance							33
Radek Fajkus	1500 m	—N/a				2:28.449	3	Did not advance			22

Women

Athlete	Event	Heats		Quarterfinal		Semifinal		Final	
Athlete	Event	Time	Rank	Time	Rank	Time	Rank	Time	Rank
Petra Vaňková	500 m	DNS		—N/a					
Petra Vaňková	1500 m	—N/a		2:38.380	2	PEN		DNA	20

== Ski jumping ==
The only Czech ski jumper František Holík attempted to finish in the top ten, but did not succeed.

Individual

Athlete	Event	First round			Final			Total	
Athlete	Event	Distance	Points	Rank	Distance	Points	Rank	Points	Rank
František Holík	Men's normal hill	81.0	102.7	11	85.5	97.9	13	200.6	12

== Snowboarding ==
Jakub Žerava and Bruno Tatarko advanced to the final stages of the men's snowboard cross event, with Žerava winning silver losing only to France's Benjamin Gattaz.

Kristián Salač performed great in both his events qualifications, but failed to prevail in the finals, despite having a great form as he confirmed soon after at the world championships, where he finished fifth in big air.

Snowboard cross

Athlete	Event	Qualification		Heats		Semifinal	Final	Final Rank
Athlete	Event	Time	Rank	Points	Position	Position	Position	Final Rank
Jakub Žerava	Men's snowboard cross	55.71	6	13	7	2	2	2nd place, silver medalist(s)
Bruno Tatarko	Men's snowboard cross	56.40	8	13	8	3	DNF	8
Matouš Šmerák	Men's snowboard cross	57.69	11	10	12	Did not advance		12
Natalie Mullen	Women's snowboard cross	1:01.48	5	11	10	Did not advance		10
Vendula Burešová	Women's snowboard cross	1:05.40	13	DNS		Did not advance		13

Halfpipe, Slopestyle & Big Air

Athlete	Event	Qualification				Final				
Athlete	Event	Run 1	Run 2	Best	Rank	Run 1	Run 2	Run 3	Total	Rank
Kristián Salač	Men's slopestyle	87.00	~~51.00~~	87.00	2	73.00	~~24.75~~	—N/a	73.00	5
Kristián Salač	Men's big air	86.00	~~21.25~~	86.00	1	34.50	~~30.75~~	67.25	101.75	9

Parallel Giant Slalom

Athlete	Event	Elimination Run		1/8 Finals	Quarterfinals	Semifinal	Final	Final Rank
Athlete	Event	Time	Rank	1/8 Finals	Quarterfinals	Semifinal	Final	Final Rank
Adam Počinek	Men's parallel giant slalom	1:04.09	13	Hong Seungyeong (KOR); L +1.22	Did not advance			9
Adam Počinek	Men's parallel slalom	1:10.69	9	Ma Junho (KOR); W -0.19	Mychajlo Charuk (UKR); L DSQ	Did not advance		8
Klára Šonková	Women's parallel giant slalom	1:05.70	13	Jang Seohee (KOR); L +0.31	Did not advance			15
Klára Šonková	Women's parallel slalom	1:15.68	11	Elisa Fava (ITA); L +1.63	Did not advance			11

== Speed skating ==
Veronika Antošová won a bronze medal in the 1500 metres race, while Zuzana Kuršová's results were less satisfactory.

Athlete	Event	Final		
Athlete	Event	Points	Time	Rank
Veronika Antošová	500 m	—N/a	41.346	12
Veronika Antošová	1000 m	—N/a	1:23.66	7
Veronika Antošová	1500 m	—N/a	2:06.63	3rd place, bronze medalist(s)
Veronika Antošová	3000 m	—N/a	4:34.14	5
Veronika Antošová	Mass start	2	(10:00.13)	10
Zuzana Kuršová	1500 m	—N/a	2:11.78	15
Zuzana Kuršová	3000 m	—N/a	4:43.80	11
Zuzana Kuršová	Mass start	1	(10:00.06)	11

== See also ==
- Czech Republic at the 2021 Summer World University Games
