= Biathlon at the 2023 Winter World University Games – Men's individual =

Men’s individual at the Lake Placid 2023 FISU World University Games
- Biathlon
- Venue: Lake Placid Olympic Sports Complex Cross Country Biathlon Center
- Date: 14 February 2023
- Competitors: 37 from 14 nations
- Winning time: 42:37.4

Medalists
1st place, gold medalist(s)		Vadim Kurales	Kazakhstan
2nd place, silver medalist(s)		Ørjan Moseng	Norway
3rd place, bronze medalist(s)		Axel Garnier	France

The Men's individual competition of the 2023 Winter World University Games was held on 14 January 2023, at the Lake Placid Olympic Sports Complex Cross Country Biathlon Center.

== Results ==
The race was started at 12:20.

Rank	Bib	Name	Country	Time	Penalties (P+S+P+S)	Deficit
1st place, gold medalist(s)	16	Vadim Kurales	Kazakhstan	42:37.4	1 (0+1+0+0)	
2nd place, silver medalist(s)	30	Ørjan Moseng	Norway	43:20.0	4 (1+1+1+1)	+42.6
3rd place, bronze medalist(s)	24	Axel Garnier	France	43:53.9	2 (0+1+0+1)	+1:16.5
4	22	Jakub Kocián	Czech Republic	44:08.7	1 (0+0+0+1)	+1:31.3
5	31	Stepan Kinash	Ukraine	44:43.5	2 (1+0+0+1)	+2:06.1
6	1	Alexandr Mukhin	Kazakhstan	44:48.9	5 (3+0+2+0)	+2:11.5
7	9	Matias Maijala	Finland	44:59.0	3 (1+1+0+1)	+2:21.6
8	26	Wojciech Janik	Poland	45:43.2	3 (0+1+1+1)	+3:05.8
9	3	Mathias Indrelid Haugen	Norway	46:02.9	1 (1+0+0+0)	+3:25.5
10	2	Patryk Bryn	Poland	46:12.6	3 (1+1+1+0)	+3:35.2
11	12	Wojciech Filip	Poland	46:22.4	5 (2+0+1+2)	+3:45.0
12	29	Van Ledger	United States	46:22.8	3 (0+2+0+1)	+3:45.4
13	34	Przemysław Pancerz	Poland	47:05.8	3 (1+0+0+2)	+4:28.4
14	6	Josef Kabrda	Czech Republic	47:08.2	6 (2+2+2+0)	+4:30.8
15	20	Dmytrii Hrushchak	Ukraine	47:12.2	6 (2+2+0+2)	+4:34.8
16	19	Cale Woods	United States	47:12.9	1 (0+1+0+0)	+4:35.5
17	7	Matej Cervenka	United States	47:41.0	4 (1+0+1+2)	+5:03.6
18	21	Kirill Bauer	Kazakhstan	47:48.5	7 (0+3+3+1)	+5:11.1
19	33	Bekentay Turlubekov	Kazakhstan	48:03.2	7 (2+3+1+1)	+5:25.8
20	27	Roman Borovyk	Ukraine	48:03.6	7 (1+2+1+3)	+5:26.2
21	4	Vladyslav Chykhar	Ukraine	48:43.8	6 (1+3+1+1)	+6:06.4
22	32	Michal Zaoral	Czech Republic	48:45.6	5 (0+3+0+2)	+6:08.2
23	17	Thibaut Frechard	France	49:34.5	7 (2+2+3+0)	+6:57.1
24	35	Timothy Cobb	United States	49:40.9	5 (2+0+2+1)	+7:03.5
25	23	Matěj Gregor	Slovakia	51:53.8	7 (1+3+2+1)	+9:16.4
26	15	William Moineau	Canada	52:00.9	4 (1+0+2+1)	+9:23.5
27	5	Shoichiro Go	Japan	52:26.6	11 (2+2+4+3)	+9:49.2
28	28	Simon Gauthier	Canada	52:45.9	8 (2+3+1+2)	+10:08.5
29	37	Lance Sekora	Canada	52:47.7	3 (0+1+2+0)	+10:10.3
30	25	Zachary Demers	Canada	53:10.9	9 (3+1+3+2)	+10:33.5
31	11	Romeo Champagne	Canada	53:27.9	8 (2+2+2+2)	+10:50.5
32	13	Cheon Yun-pil	South Korea	54:33.4	11 (3+4+2+2)	+11:56.0
33	8	Nathan Livingood	United States	54:36.2	9 (3+3+1+2)	+11:58.8
34	14	Matěj Badáň	Slovakia	55:04.4	6 (2+2+1+1)	+12:27.0
35	36	William Ng	Canada	56:25.1	10 (4+1+2+3)	+13:47.7
36	18	Jon Visser	Netherlands	1:01:43.0	9 (2+3+2+2)	+19:05.6
37	10	Samuel Martin	Australia	1:09:55.9	7 (2+1+2+2)	+27:18.5
