= Alpine skiing at the 2023 Winter World University Games – Women's super-G =

Women's super-G at the Lake Placid 2023 FISU World University Games
- Alpine skiing
- Venue: Whiteface Mountain
- Date: January 14, 2023
- Competitors: 35 from 15 nations
- Winning time: 52.18

Medalists
1st place, gold medalist(s)		Fabiana Dorigo	Germany
2nd place, silver medalist(s)		Carmen Sofie Nielssen	Norway
3rd place, bronze medalist(s)		Celia Abad	Spain

The women's super-G competition of the Alpine skiing at the 2023 Winter World University Games was scheduled to be held on January 13, 2023, on Whiteface Mountain, due to adverse weather it was postponed to January 14.

== Results ==
The race was started at 13:00 (UTC–5).

Rank	Bib	Name	Country	Time	Behind
1st place, gold medalist(s)	4	Fabiana Dorigo	Germany	52.18	
2nd place, silver medalist(s)	10	Carmen Sofie Nielssen	Norway	52.65	+0.47
3rd place, bronze medalist(s)	16	Celia Abad	Spain	52.79	+0.61
4	26	Téa Lamboray	France	52.82	+0.64
5	14	Leonie Flötgen	Germany	52.85	+0.67
6	7	Alexandra Walz	Switzerland	53.03	+0.85
7	22	Julia Socquet Dagoreau	France	53.16	+0.98
8	9	Klára Gašparíková	Czech Republic	53.31	+1.13
9	2	Louison Accambray	France	53.43	+1.25
10	8	Michelle Hurni	Switzerland	53.48	+1.30
11	6	Anastasiya Shepilenko	Ukraine	53.61	+1.43
12	20	Domenica Mosca	Switzerland	53.63	+1.45
13	19	Claire Timmermann	Canada	53.99	+1.81
14	18	Cecilia Fantoli	Italy	54.09	+1.91
15	3	Cheyenne Brown	United States	54.12	+1.94
15	13	Petra Hromcová	Slovakia	54.12	+1.94
17	27	Mia Hunt	United States	54.14	+1.96
18	11	Olivia Wenk	Germany	54.15	+1.97
19	5	Sophia Eckstein	Germany	54.51	+2.33
20	17	Martina Sacchi	Italy	54.67	+2.49
21	23	Ainsley Proffit	United States	54.81	+2.63
22	15	Beatrice Costato	Italy	54.95	+2.77
23	1	Aneta Vetrová	Czech Republic	55.20	+3.02
24	33	Hina Honda	Japan	55.62	+3.44
25	34	Szonja Hozmann	Hungary	55.63	+3.45
26	24	Chiara Ferracci	Italy	56.13	+3.95
27	31	Gabrielle Fafard	Canada	56.21	+4.07
28	25	Ashley Rose Humphreys	United States	56.43	+4.25
29	21	Kateryna Shepilenko	Ukraine	56.62	+4.44
30	35	Hanna Majtényi	Hungary	56.92	+4.74
31	28	Yukino Hatanaka	Japan	56.97	+4.79
32	32	Sophie Mahon	Australia	57.33	+5.15
33	29	Maureen Lambert	Belgium	1:01.68	+9.50
	12	Axelle Chevrier	France	DNF	
	30	Carlotta Marcora	Italy	DNF	
