= Paul Vieuxtemps =

Thai freestyle skier

Personal information
- Nationality: Thailand
- Born: Paul Henri Vieuxtemps; 1 December 1999 (age 26)
- Height: 170 cm (5 ft 7 in)

Sport
- Sport: Skiing
Medal record
Men's freestyle skiing
Representing Thailand
Asian Winter Games
Bronze medal – third place	2025 Harbin	Slopestyle
Winter World University Games
Silver medal – second place	2023 Lake Placid	Big air
Bronze medal – third place	2023 Lake Placid	Slopestyle

Paul Henri Vieuxtemps (Thai: ปอล ฮองรี วิเยอร์ต๊องส์; born 1 December 1999) is a Thai freestyle skier. He was the first medalist for Thailand in the Asian Winter Games, winning the men's slopestyle event in the 2025 edition.

== Career ==
Vieuxtemps has competed under the auspices of the Ski and Snowboard Association of Thailand. He has been competing for Thailand in FIS-sanctioned events since 2016.

He reportedly was to take part at the 2018 Winter Olympics in Pyeongchang, South Korea but withdrew after sustaining a neck injury.

He took part at the 2019 Winter Universiade in Krasnoyarsk, Russia. He returned to the next edition of the Universiade now known as the 2023 Winter World University Games in Lake Placid, United States. There he won a silver in big air and bronze in slopestyle – the very first medals for his nation.

He was among Thailand's athletes at the 2025 Asian Winter Games in Harbin, China. Vieuxtemps was coached by former Ski World Cup halfpipe competitor Mathias Wecxsteen. In the men's slopestyle event he won a bronze medal behind gold medalist Rai Kasamura and silver medalist Ruka Ito; both from Japan. This is Thailand's first ever medal of any color at the Asian Winter Games.

== Personal life ==
As of early 2025, Vieuxtemps is a student of Grenoble Alpes University in France. Vieuxtemps who lives in France is a Thai and French dual national. His mother is Thai.
