= Albert Ortega =

Spanish alpine skier (born 1998)

Personal information
- Born: 18 November 1998 (age 27) Spain

Skiing career
- Sport: Alpine skiing
- Disciplines: Downhill, Super-G

Olympics
- Teams: 0

World Championships
- Teams: 2 – (2021, 2023)
- Medals: 0

World Cup
- Podiums: 0
- Overall titles: 0
- Discipline titles: 0
Medal record
Men's alpine skiing
Representing Spain
Winter Universiade
| Gold medal – first place | 2023 Lake Placid | Combined |

Albert Ortega (born 18 November 1998) is a Spanish alpine ski racer.

== World Championship results ==
| Year | Age | Slalom | Giant slalom | Super-G | Downhill | Combined | Parallel | Team event |
|---|---|---|---|---|---|---|---|---|
| 2021 | 22 | — | 21 | 22 | — | 12 | — | — |
| 2023 | 24 | — | 23 | 33 | — | 8 | — | — |
