= Jan Zabystřan =

Czech alpine skier (born 1998)

Personal information
- Born: 26 January 1998 (age 28) Kadaň, Czech Republic

Skiing career
- Country: Czech Republic
- Sport: Alpine skiing
- Club: LK Chomutov
- World Cup debut: 13 January 2017 (age 18)

Olympics
- Teams: 3 – (2018, 2022, 2026)
- Medals: 0

World Championships
- Teams: 5 – (2017–2025)
- Medals: 0

World Cup
- Seasons: 8 – (2017–2026)
- Wins: 1 – (1 SG)
- Podiums: 1 – (1 SG)
- Overall titles: 0 – (48th in 2026)
- Discipline titles: 0 – (12th in SG, 2026)
Medal record
Winter Universiade
Gold medal – first place	2023 Lake Placid	Super-G
Gold medal – first place	2023 Lake Placid	Giant slalom
Bronze medal – third place	2023 Lake Placid	Combined

Jan Zabystřan (born 26 January 1998) is a Czech alpine skier. He competed in the 2018, 2022, and 2026 Winter Olympics.

== World Cup results ==
=== Season standings ===
Season
Season	Age	Overall	Slalom	Giant slalom	Super-G	Downhill	Combined
2019	21	150	—	—	—	—	40
2020	22	127	—	—	—	—	28
2021	23	no World Cup points earned					—N/a
2022	24	no World Cup points earned					—N/a
2023	25	137	—	—	51	—	—N/a
2024	26	123	—	—	—	50	—N/a
2025	27	57	—	—	22	30	—N/a
2026	28	48	—	—	12	56	—N/a

=== Top-ten results ===
- 1 win – (1 SG)
- 1 podium – (1 SG); 2 top tens (2 SG)

Season
Season	Date	Location	Discipline	Place
2025	9 March 2025	Kvitfjell, Norway	Super-G	8th
2026	19 December 2025	Val Gardena, Italy	Super-G	1st

== World Championship results ==
Year
Year	Age	Slalom	Giant slalom	Super-G	Downhill	Combined	Team combined	Parallel	Team event
2017	19	DNF1	—	40	44	38	—N/a	—N/a	—
2019	21	—	31	DNF	47	15	—N/a	—N/a	9
2021	23	DNF1	DNF1	20	—	9	—N/a	DNFQ	13 (Note: Team member, but did not compete)
2023	25	—	DNF1	DNF	—	DNF2	—N/a	DNQ	10
2025	27	—	30	16	19	—N/a	16	—N/a	—

== Olympic results ==
Year
Year	Age	Slalom	Giant slalom	Super-G	Downhill	Combined	Team combined	Team event
2018	20	DNF1	DNF1	40	46	DNF2	—N/a	9
2022	24	DNF1	DNF1	25	—	DNF2	—N/a	14
2026	28	—	—	17	24	—N/a	20	—N/a
