= Curling at the 2023 Winter World University Games =

- Host city: Saranac Lake, New York, United States
- Arena: Saranac Lake Civic Center
- Dates: January 13–21
- Men's winner: Great Britain
- Curling club: University of Stirling, Stirling; The Open University, Milton Keynes; University of Strathclyde, Glasgow; Glasgow Caledonian University, Glasgow
- Skip: James Craik
- Third: Mark Watt
- Second: Angus Bryce
- Lead: Blair Haswell
- Alternate: Jack Carrick
- Coach: Iain Watt
- Finalist: United States (Casper)
- Women's winner: China
- Curling club: Beijing Sport University, Beijing
- Skip: Han Yu
- Third: Dong Ziqi
- Second: Zhu Zihui
- Lead: Jiang Jiayi
- Alternate: Ren Haining
- Coach: Yu Zuojun
- Finalist: South Korea (Ha)

Curling at the 2023 Winter World University Games took place at the Saranac Lake Civic Center in Saranac Lake, New York, United States. The event ran from Friday, January 13, 2023 to Saturday, January 21, 2023.

== Medal summary ==
=== Medal table ===
Rank	Nation	Gold	Silver	Bronze	Total
1	China	1	0	0	1
1	Great Britain	1	0	0	1
3	United States*	0	1	1	2
4	South Korea	0	1	0	1
5	Canada	0	0	1	1
Totals (5 entries)		2	2	2	6

=== Medallists ===
Event	Gold	Silver	Bronze
Men	Great Britain; James Craik; Mark Watt; Angus Bryce; Blair Haswell; Jack Carrick	United States; Daniel Casper; Luc Violette; Ben Richardson; Chase Sinnett; Marius Kleinas	Canada; Owen Purcell; Jeffrey Meagher; Adam McEachren; David McCurdy; Caelan McPherson
Women	China; Han Yu; Dong Ziqi; Zhu Zihui; Jiang Jiayi; Ren Haining	South Korea; Ha Seung-youn; Kim Hye-rin; Yang Tae-i; Kim Su-jin	United States; Delaney Strouse; Anne O'Hara; Sydney Mullaney; Rebecca Rodgers; Susan Dudt

== Men ==
=== Teams ===
The teams are listed as follows:

Brazil	Canada	Czech Republic	Great Britain	Japan
Brazilian Confederation of Ice Sports Skip: Vitor de Melo; Third: Nuno Rodrigues; Second: Kyron Suhan; Lead: Arthur Camelo	Dalhousie University Skip: Owen Purcell; Third: Jeffrey Meagher; Second: Adam McEachren; Lead: David McCurdy; Alternate: Caelan McPherson	Skip: David Jakl; Third: Marek Bříza; Second: David Škácha; Lead: Aleš Hercok; Alternate: David Verner	Skip: James Craik; Third: Mark Watt; Second: Angus Bryce; Lead: Blair Haswell; Alternate: Jack Carrick	Sapporo International University Fourth: Go Aoki; Skip: Hayato Sato; Second: Haruki Watanabe; Lead: Kazushi Niino; Alternate: Ayato Sasaki
Norway	South Korea	Sweden	Switzerland	United States
Linnaeus University Skip: Mathias Brænden; Third: Andreas Hårstad; Second: Nicolai Sommervold; Lead: Eirik Øy	Kyungil University Fourth: Kim Hyo-jun; Skip: Lee Jae-beom; Second: Pyo Jeong-min; Lead: Kim Jin-hun; Alternate: Kim Eun-bin	Skip: Johan Nygren; Third: Daniel Magnusson; Second: Simon Olofsson; Lead: Jacob Hanna	Skip: Jan Iseli; Third: Maximilian Winz; Second: Andreas Gerlach; Lead: Matthieu Fague; Alternate: Nathan Weber	Skip: Daniel Casper; Third: Luc Violette; Second: Ben Richardson; Lead: Chase Sinnett; Alternate: Marius Kleinas

=== Round-robin standings ===
Final round-robin standings

Key
Teams to Playoffs

Country	Skip	W	L	W–L	PF	PA	EW	EL	BE	SE	DSC
Great Britain	James Craik	8	1	–	64	30	37	23	2	13	41.64
Switzerland	Jan Iseli	7	2	–	50	37	31	25	8	10	31.88
United States	Daniel Casper	6	3	1–0	56	45	33	33	1	9	31.00
Canada	Owen Purcell	6	3	0–1	53	37	30	23	5	8	40.74
Sweden	Johan Nygren	5	4	–	50	43	32	31	4	10	52.39
South Korea	Lee Jae-beom	4	5	2–0	51	52	29	30	2	8	52.19
Norway	Mathias Brænden	4	5	1–1	49	54	29	33	6	4	53.48
Japan	Hayato Sato	4	5	0–2	46	45	27	32	4	6	64.48
Czech Republic	David Jakl	1	8	–	40	62	29	33	3	8	78.28
Brazil	Vitor de Melo	0	9	–	23	77	20	34	1	3	135.82

Round Robin Summary Table
Pos.	Country	Brazil	Canada	Czech Republic	Great Britain	Japan	Norway	South Korea	Sweden	Switzerland	United States	Record
10	Brazil	—	2–10	3–6	3–7	2–7	4–9	3–12	2–9	1–8	3–9	0–9
4	Canada	10–2	—	8–1	2–8	5–3	5–2	9–4	6–5	4–7	4–5	6–3
9	Czech Republic	6–3	1–8	—	6–7	4–5	6–8	3–6	7–9	3–8	4–8	1–8
1	Great Britain	7–3	8–2	7–6	—	4–6	8–7	8–1	5–2	10–1	7–2	8–1
8	Japan	7–2	3–5	5–4	6–4	—	6–7	4–7	6–7	3–4	6–5	4–5
7	Norway	9–4	2–5	8–6	7–8	7–6	—	2–6	3–5	4–8	7–6	4–5
6	South Korea	12–3	4–9	6–3	1–8	7–4	6–2	—	3–8	4–6	8–9	4–5
5	Sweden	9–2	5–6	9–7	2–5	7–6	5–3	8–3	—	3–4	2–7	5–4
2	Switzerland	8–1	7–4	8–3	1–10	4–3	8–4	6–4	4–3	—	4–5	7–2
3	United States	9–3	5–4	8–4	2–7	5–6	6–7	9–8	7–2	5–4	—	6–3

=== Round-robin results ===
All draw times are listed in Eastern Time (UTC−05:00).

==== Draw 1 ====
Friday, January 13, 19:00

Sheet A	1	2	3	4	5	6	7	8	Final
South Korea (Lee)	0	0	1	0	0	0	X	X	1
Great Britain (Craik)	1	1	0	3	2	1	X	X	8

Sheet B	1	2	3	4	5	6	7	8	Final
Switzerland (Iseli)	2	0	1	0	0	3	1	X	7
Canada (Purcell)	0	1	0	3	0	0	0	X	4

Sheet C	1	2	3	4	5	6	7	8	Final
Sweden (Nygren)	0	1	0	0	0	0	1	X	2
United States (Casper)	0	0	1	2	1	3	0	X	7

Sheet D	1	2	3	4	5	6	7	8	Final
Czech Republic (Jakl)	1	0	0	1	0	4	0	X	6
Brazil (de Melo)	0	1	0	0	1	0	1	X	3

Sheet E	1	2	3	4	5	6	7	8	Final
Norway (Brænden)	0	0	3	1	0	2	0	1	7
Japan (Sato)	0	4	0	0	1	0	1	0	6

==== Draw 2 ====
Saturday, January 14, 14:00

Sheet A	1	2	3	4	5	6	7	8	Final
Canada (Purcell)	0	0	2	1	2	0	3	X	8
Czech Republic (Jakl)	0	0	0	0	0	1	0	X	1

Sheet B	1	2	3	4	5	6	7	8	Final
Great Britain (Craik)	0	3	3	0	1	0	X	X	7
Brazil (de Melo)	1	0	0	1	0	1	X	X	3

Sheet C	1	2	3	4	5	6	7	8	Final
Norway (Brænden)	0	1	0	1	0	0	0	X	2
South Korea (Lee)	1	0	1	0	1	2	1	X	6

Sheet D	1	2	3	4	5	6	7	8	9	Final
Japan (Sato)	0	2	1	0	1	0	0	1	1	6
United States (Casper)	1	0	0	2	0	1	1	0	0	5

Sheet E	1	2	3	4	5	6	7	8	9	Final
Switzerland (Iseli)	1	0	0	0	0	0	1	1	1	4
Sweden (Nygren)	0	0	1	1	0	1	0	0	0	3

==== Draw 3 ====
Sunday, January 15, 9:00

Sheet A	1	2	3	4	5	6	7	8	Final
United States (Casper)	0	2	0	0	0	2	0	1	5
Switzerland (Iseli)	1	0	0	1	1	0	1	0	4

Sheet B	1	2	3	4	5	6	7	8	Final
South Korea (Lee)	0	0	2	0	2	0	3	X	7
Japan (Sato)	0	0	0	2	0	2	0	X	4

Sheet C	1	2	3	4	5	6	7	8	9	Final
Great Britain (Craik)	0	0	2	0	0	3	1	0	1	7
Czech Republic (Jakl)	1	1	0	1	1	0	0	2	0	6

Sheet D	1	2	3	4	5	6	7	8	Final
Sweden (Nygren)	1	0	1	2	0	1	0	0	5
Norway (Brænden)	0	2	0	0	1	0	0	0	3

Sheet E	1	2	3	4	5	6	7	8	Final
Canada (Purcell)	4	3	0	2	0	1	X	X	10
Brazil (de Melo)	0	0	1	0	1	0	X	X	2

==== Draw 4 ====
Sunday, January 15, 19:00

Sheet A	1	2	3	4	5	6	7	8	Final
Brazil (de Melo)	1	0	0	1	2	0	0	X	4
Norway (Brænden)	0	1	2	0	0	3	3	X	9

Sheet B	1	2	3	4	5	6	7	8	Final
Sweden (Nygren)	0	0	2	1	0	0	3	3	9
Czech Republic (Jakl)	1	2	0	0	1	3	0	0	7

Sheet C	1	2	3	4	5	6	7	8	Final
Japan (Sato)	0	0	1	0	2	0	0	X	3
Canada (Purcell)	0	1	0	2	0	1	1	X	5

Sheet D	1	2	3	4	5	6	7	8	9	Final
United States (Casper)	3	0	0	1	0	1	3	0	1	9
South Korea (Lee)	0	2	2	0	1	0	0	3	0	8

Sheet E	1	2	3	4	5	6	7	8	Final
Great Britain (Craik)	2	2	2	3	0	1	X	X	10
Switzerland (Iseli)	0	0	0	0	1	0	X	X	1

==== Draw 5 ====
Monday, January 16, 14:00

Sheet A	1	2	3	4	5	6	7	8	Final
Sweden (Nygren)	0	2	0	2	0	0	1	0	5
Canada (Purcell)	2	0	1	0	1	0	0	2	6

Sheet B	1	2	3	4	5	6	7	8	9	Final
Norway (Brænden)	1	0	2	0	2	0	2	0	0	7
Great Britain (Craik)	0	2	0	1	0	2	0	2	1	8

Sheet C	1	2	3	4	5	6	7	8	Final
South Korea (Lee)	4	0	6	0	0	2	X	X	12
Brazil (de Melo)	0	2	0	0	1	0	X	X	3

Sheet D	1	2	3	4	5	6	7	8	9	Final
Switzerland (Iseli)	0	0	0	1	0	2	0	0	1	4
Japan (Sato)	0	0	1	0	0	0	1	1	0	3

Sheet E	1	2	3	4	5	6	7	8	Final
Czech Republic (Jakl)	1	0	1	0	1	1	0	X	4
United States (Casper)	0	4	0	2	0	0	2	X	8

==== Draw 6 ====
Tuesday, January 17, 9:00

Sheet A	1	2	3	4	5	6	7	8	9	Final
Norway (Brænden)	0	0	3	0	1	0	0	2	1	7
United States (Casper)	1	0	0	1	0	3	1	0	0	6

Sheet B	1	2	3	4	5	6	7	8	Final
Canada (Purcell)	0	3	2	0	4	0	X	X	9
South Korea (Lee)	1	0	0	1	0	2	X	X	4

Sheet C	1	2	3	4	5	6	7	8	Final
Czech Republic (Jakl)	0	2	0	1	0	0	0	X	3
Switzerland (Iseli)	3	0	2	0	0	2	1	X	8

Sheet D	1	2	3	4	5	6	7	8	Final
Brazil (de Melo)	1	0	0	0	1	0	0	X	2
Sweden (Nygren)	0	1	2	1	0	2	3	X	9

Sheet E	1	2	3	4	5	6	7	8	Final
Japan (Sato)	0	1	0	2	0	0	3	0	6
Great Britain (Craik)	0	0	2	0	0	1	0	1	4

==== Draw 7 ====
Tuesday, January 17, 19:00

Sheet A	1	2	3	4	5	6	7	8	Final
Switzerland (Iseli)	0	1	0	3	1	3	X	X	8
Brazil (de Melo)	0	0	1	0	0	0	X	X	1

Sheet B	1	2	3	4	5	6	7	8	Final
Japan (Sato)	0	3	0	1	0	0	2	0	6
Sweden (Nygren)	2	0	2	0	1	1	0	1	7

Sheet C	1	2	3	4	5	6	7	8	Final
United States (Casper)	0	0	1	0	0	1	0	X	2
Great Britain (Craik)	1	0	0	2	1	0	3	X	7

Sheet D	1	2	3	4	5	6	7	8	Final
Norway (Brænden)	1	0	0	0	1	0	0	X	2
Canada (Purcell)	0	2	0	0	0	2	1	X	5

Sheet E	1	2	3	4	5	6	7	8	Final
South Korea (Lee)	2	1	0	2	0	1	0	X	6
Czech Republic (Jakl)	0	0	1	0	1	0	1	X	3

==== Draw 8 ====
Wednesday, January 18, 14:00

Sheet A	1	2	3	4	5	6	7	8	Final
Great Britain (Craik)	1	0	0	1	1	1	0	1	5
Sweden (Nygren)	0	0	1	0	0	0	1	0	2

Sheet B	1	2	3	4	5	6	7	8	Final
Czech Republic (Jakl)	0	2	0	2	0	2	0	X	6
Norway (Brænden)	1	0	3	0	1	0	3	X	8

Sheet C	1	2	3	4	5	6	7	8	Final
Brazil (de Melo)	0	1	0	0	1	0	X	X	2
Japan (Sato)	2	0	0	2	0	3	X	X	7

Sheet D	1	2	3	4	5	6	7	8	Final
South Korea (Lee)	0	1	0	2	0	1	0	0	4
Switzerland (Iseli)	0	0	1	0	2	0	2	1	6

Sheet E	1	2	3	4	5	6	7	8	Final
United States (Casper)	2	0	2	0	0	1	0	0	5
Canada (Purcell)	0	1	0	0	1	0	1	1	4

==== Draw 9 ====
Thursday, January 19, 9:00

Sheet A	1	2	3	4	5	6	7	8	9	Final
Czech Republic (Jakl)	0	1	0	0	1	1	0	1	0	4
Japan (Sato)	0	0	1	0	0	0	3	0	1	5

Sheet B	1	2	3	4	5	6	7	8	Final
Brazil (de Melo)	0	1	0	0	2	0	0	X	3
United States (Casper)	4	0	2	1	0	1	1	X	9

Sheet C	1	2	3	4	5	6	7	8	Final
Switzerland (Iseli)	0	2	0	2	0	4	0	X	8
Norway (Brænden)	0	0	2	0	1	0	1	X	4

Sheet D	1	2	3	4	5	6	7	8	Final
Canada (Purcell)	0	0	0	1	0	1	0	X	2
Great Britain (Craik)	0	0	1	0	3	0	4	X	8

Sheet E	1	2	3	4	5	6	7	8	Final
Sweden (Nygren)	1	4	0	0	2	0	1	X	8
South Korea (Lee)	0	0	1	1	0	1	0	X	3

=== Playoffs ===
Semifinals
1	Great Britain	6
4	Canada	4
2	Switzerland	3
3	United States	6

Final
1	Great Britain	5
3	United States	1
Bronze medal game
4	Canada	3
2	Switzerland	2

==== Semifinals ====
Thursday, January 19, 19:00

Sheet B	1	2	3	4	5	6	7	8	Final
Great Britain (Craik)	0	2	0	0	3	0	0	1	6
Canada (Purcell)	0	0	1	0	0	2	1	0	4

Player percentages
Great Britain		Canada	
Blair Haswell	91%	David McCurdy	88%
Angus Bryce	92%	Adam McEachren	84%
Mark Watt	95%	Jeffrey Meagher	84%
James Craik	82%	Owen Purcell	86%
Total	90%	Total	86%

Sheet D	1	2	3	4	5	6	7	8	Final
Switzerland (Iseli)	1	0	1	0	0	1	0	X	3
United States (Casper)	0	0	0	3	1	0	2	X	6

Player percentages
Switzerland		United States	
Matthieu Fague	70%	Chase Sinnett	81%
Andreas Gerlach	77%	Ben Richardson	95%
Maximilian Winz	81%	Luc Violette	81%
Jan Iseli	72%	Daniel Casper	92%
Total	75%	Total	88%

==== Bronze medal game ====
Friday, January 20, 19:00

Sheet C	1	2	3	4	5	6	7	8	Final
Canada (Purcell)	0	0	0	0	1	1	0	1	3
Switzerland (Iseli)	0	0	1	1	0	0	0	0	2

Player percentages
Canada		Switzerland	
David McCurdy	78%	Matthieu Fague	78%
Adam McEachren	53%	Andreas Gerlach	75%
Jeffrey Meagher	97%	Maximilian Winz	92%
Owen Purcell	84%	Jan Iseli	81%
Total	78%	Total	82%

==== Final ====
Saturday, January 21, 14:00

Sheet C	1	2	3	4	5	6	7	8	Final
Great Britain (Craik)	1	2	0	0	0	1	1	X	5
United States (Casper)	0	0	0	1	0	0	0	X	1

Player percentages
Great Britain		United States	
Blair Haswell	88%	Chase Sinnett	84%
Angus Bryce	80%	Ben Richardson	86%
Mark Watt	92%	Luc Violette	88%
James Craik	83%	Daniel Casper	79%
Total	86%	Total	84%

=== Final standings ===
Place	Team
1st place, gold medalist(s)	Great Britain
2nd place, silver medalist(s)	United States
3rd place, bronze medalist(s)	Canada
4	Switzerland
5	Sweden
6	South Korea
7	Norway
8	Japan
9	Czech Republic
10	Brazil

== Women ==
=== Teams ===
The teams are listed as follows:

Australia	Canada	China	Great Britain	Japan
Skip: Kirby Gill; Third: Tahli Gill; Second: Ivy Militano; Lead: Jayna Gill; Alternate: Joanne Robins	University of Alberta Skip: Abby Marks; Third: Catherine Clifford; Second: Brianna Cullen; Lead: Paige Papley; Alternate: Serena Gray-Withers	Beijing Sport University Skip: Han Yu; Third: Dong Ziqi; Second: Zhu Zihui; Lead: Jiang Jiayi; Alternate: Ren Haining	Skip: Fay Henderson; Third: Robyn Munro; Second: Holly Wilkie-Milne; Lead: Laura Watt; Alternate: Lisa Davie	Fourth: Miyu Ueno; Skip: Sae Yamamoto; Second: Suzune Yasui; Lead: Momoka Iwase; Alternate: Mizuki Hara
South Korea	Spain	Sweden	Switzerland	United States
Korea National Open University Skip: Ha Seung-youn; Third: Kim Hye-rin; Second: Yang Tae-i; Lead: Kim Su-jin	Skip: Carmen Pérez; Third: María Gómez; Second: Daniela García; Lead: Leire Carasa; Alternate: Ana Vázquez	Skip: Emma Moberg; Third: Sofie Bergman; Second: Emma Landelius; Lead: Mikaela Altebro	Skip: Corrie Hürlimann; Third: Celina Schwizgebel; Second: Anna Gut; Lead: Nadine Bärtschiger; Alternate: Malin Da Ros	Skip: Delaney Strouse; Third: Anne O'Hara; Second: Sydney Mullaney; Lead: Rebecca Rodgers; Alternate: Susan Dudt

=== Round-robin standings ===
Final round-robin standings

Key
Teams to Playoffs

Country	Skip	W	L	W–L	PF	PA	EW	EL	BE	SE	DSC
South Korea	Ha Seung-youn	8	1	1–0	67	37	38	26	1	17	44.49
United States	Delaney Strouse	8	1	0–1	67	33	39	27	2	14	39.14
China	Han Yu	7	2	1–0	62	36	38	26	3	13	38.38
Great Britain	Fay Henderson	7	2	0–1	56	36	31	28	5	8	48.81
Sweden	Emma Moberg	4	5	1–1	52	48	32	28	2	11	34.58
Switzerland	Corrie Hürlimann	4	5	1–1	52	51	30	33	3	8	46.85
Canada	Abby Marks	4	5	1–1	55	43	28	30	2	9	74.19
Japan	Sae Yamamoto	2	7	–	43	63	27	31	2	9	50.37
Spain	Carmen Pérez	1	8	–	26	85	20	36	1	4	89.51
Australia	Kirby Gill	0	9	–	25	73	19	38	3	1	88.59

Round Robin Summary Table
Pos.	Country	Australia	Canada	China	Great Britain	Japan	South Korea	Spain	Sweden	Switzerland	United States	Record
9	Australia	—	1–10	2–9	3–9	2–6	1–11	5–7	4–7	4–7	3–7	0–9
7	Canada	10–1	—	4–7	4–8	9–2	5–6	12–2	2–6	5–3	4–8	4–5
3	China	9–2	7–4	—	6–3	7–3	6–8	9–5	6–4	9–2	3–5	7–2
4	Great Britain	9–3	8–4	3–6	—	9–5	5–2	6–3	7–2	6–4	3–7	7–2
8	Japan	6–2	2–9	3–7	5–9	—	5–7	10–1	3–9	7–9	2–10	2–7
1	South Korea	11–1	6–5	8–6	2–5	7–5	—	15–1	6–5	5–3	7–6	8–1
10	Spain	7–5	2–12	5–9	3–6	1–10	1–15	—	2–10	2–11	3–7	1–8
5	Sweden	7–4	6–2	4–6	2–7	9–3	5–6	10–2	—	6–8	3–10	4–5
6	Switzerland	7–4	3–5	2–9	4–6	9–7	3–5	11–2	8–6	—	5–7	4–5
2	United States	7–3	8–4	5–3	7–3	10–2	6–7	7–3	10–3	7–5	—	8–1

=== Round-robin results ===
All draw times are listed in Eastern Time (UTC−05:00).

==== Draw 1 ====
Friday, January 13, 14:00

Sheet A	1	2	3	4	5	6	7	8	Final
Australia (Gill)	0	0	0	0	1	0	1	X	2
Japan (Yamamoto)	1	1	1	1	0	2	0	X	6

Sheet B	1	2	3	4	5	6	7	8	Final
Sweden (Moberg)	0	1	0	0	2	0	X	X	3
United States (Strouse)	4	0	2	1	0	3	X	X	10

Sheet C	1	2	3	4	5	6	7	8	Final
Spain (Pérez)	0	1	1	0	1	0	2	0	5
China (Han)	2	0	0	4	0	1	0	2	9

Sheet D	1	2	3	4	5	6	7	8	Final
Canada (Marks)	0	2	0	0	0	2	0	1	5
South Korea (Ha)	1	0	2	1	1	0	1	0	6

Sheet E	1	2	3	4	5	6	7	8	Final
Great Britain (Henderson)	0	0	0	0	2	0	2	2	6
Switzerland (Hürlimann)	0	0	2	1	0	1	0	0	4

==== Draw 2 ====
Saturday, January 14, 9:00

Sheet A	1	2	3	4	5	6	7	8	Final
United States (Strouse)	1	0	2	1	2	0	2	X	8
Canada (Marks)	0	2	0	0	0	2	0	X	4

Sheet B	1	2	3	4	5	6	7	8	Final
Japan (Yamamoto)	1	0	0	2	0	2	0	X	5
South Korea (Ha)	0	0	1	0	2	0	4	X	7

Sheet C	1	2	3	4	5	6	7	8	Final
Great Britain (Henderson)	0	2	2	0	3	0	2	X	9
Australia (Gill)	1	0	0	1	0	1	0	X	3

Sheet D	1	2	3	4	5	6	7	8	Final
Switzerland (Hürlimann)	1	0	0	0	0	1	0	X	2
China (Han)	0	2	1	1	3	0	2	X	9

Sheet E	1	2	3	4	5	6	7	8	Final
Sweden (Moberg)	0	5	1	3	0	1	X	X	10
Spain (Pérez)	0	0	0	0	2	0	X	X	2

==== Draw 3 ====
Saturday, January 14, 19:00

Sheet A	1	2	3	4	5	6	7	8	Final
China (Han)	1	0	2	0	0	2	1	0	6
Sweden (Moberg)	0	1	0	1	0	0	0	2	4

Sheet B	1	2	3	4	5	6	7	8	Final
Australia (Gill)	0	0	1	0	1	0	2	X	4
Switzerland (Hürlimann)	0	1	0	3	0	3	0	X	7

Sheet C	1	2	3	4	5	6	7	8	Final
Japan (Yamamoto)	1	0	1	0	0	0	X	X	2
Canada (Marks)	0	2	0	2	4	1	X	X	9

Sheet D	1	2	3	4	5	6	7	8	Final
Spain (Pérez)	0	0	1	1	0	1	0	X	3
Great Britain (Henderson)	0	2	0	0	3	0	1	X	6

Sheet E	1	2	3	4	5	6	7	8	9	Final
United States (Strouse)	0	3	0	1	0	1	0	1	0	6
South Korea (Ha)	0	0	2	0	2	0	2	0	1	7

==== Draw 4 ====
Sunday, January 15, 14:00

Sheet A	1	2	3	4	5	6	7	8	Final
South Korea (Ha)	0	0	1	0	1	0	0	0	2
Great Britain (Henderson)	0	0	0	1	0	1	1	2	5

Sheet B	1	2	3	4	5	6	7	8	Final
Spain (Pérez)	0	0	0	0	0	2	X	X	2
Canada (Marks)	2	4	2	3	1	0	X	X	12

Sheet C	1	2	3	4	5	6	7	8	Final
Switzerland (Hürlimann)	0	2	0	0	1	2	0	0	5
United States (Strouse)	2	0	1	1	0	0	2	1	7

Sheet D	1	2	3	4	5	6	7	8	Final
China (Han)	2	2	2	3	0	0	X	X	9
Australia (Gill)	0	0	0	0	0	2	X	X	2

Sheet E	1	2	3	4	5	6	7	8	Final
Japan (Yamamoto)	0	0	2	0	1	0	X	X	3
Sweden (Moberg)	3	2	0	3	0	1	X	X	9

==== Draw 5 ====
Monday, January 16, 9:00

Sheet A	1	2	3	4	5	6	7	8	Final
Spain (Pérez)	0	0	2	0	1	0	0	X	3
United States (Strouse)	1	3	0	2	0	1	0	X	7

Sheet B	1	2	3	4	5	6	7	8	Final
Great Britain (Henderson)	0	1	2	0	3	0	0	3	9
Japan (Yamamoto)	0	0	0	1	0	2	2	0	5

Sheet C	1	2	3	4	5	6	7	8	Final
Australia (Gill)	0	1	0	0	0	0	X	X	1
South Korea (Ha)	2	0	3	1	4	1	X	X	11

Sheet D	1	2	3	4	5	6	7	8	Final
Sweden (Moberg)	0	1	2	0	2	1	0	0	6
Switzerland (Hürlimann)	2	0	0	2	0	0	3	1	8

Sheet E	1	2	3	4	5	6	7	8	Final
Canada (Marks)	0	0	1	0	2	0	1	0	4
China (Han)	0	2	0	1	0	1	0	3	7

==== Draw 6 ====
Monday, January 16, 19:00

Sheet A	1	2	3	4	5	6	7	8	Final
Great Britain (Henderson)	0	0	1	0	1	0	1	0	3
China (Han)	1	1	0	1	0	2	0	1	6

Sheet B	1	2	3	4	5	6	7	8	Final
United States (Strouse)	2	0	2	0	3	0	0	X	7
Australia (Gill)	0	1	0	1	0	1	0	X	3

Sheet C	1	2	3	4	5	6	7	8	Final
Canada (Marks)	0	0	0	0	0	2	0	X	2
Sweden (Moberg)	1	1	1	1	1	0	1	X	6

Sheet D	1	2	3	4	5	6	7	8	Final
South Korea (Ha)	3	4	2	4	2	0	X	X	15
Spain (Pérez)	0	0	0	0	0	1	X	X	1

Sheet E	1	2	3	4	5	6	7	8	9	Final
Switzerland (Hürlimann)	0	0	1	0	3	0	0	3	2	9
Japan (Yamamoto)	0	2	0	2	0	1	2	0	0	7

==== Draw 7 ====
Tuesday, January 17, 14:00

Sheet A	1	2	3	4	5	6	7	8	Final
Sweden (Moberg)	2	0	0	2	0	0	0	1	5
South Korea (Ha)	0	1	1	0	2	1	1	0	6

Sheet B	1	2	3	4	5	6	7	8	Final
Switzerland (Hürlimann)	1	0	3	1	2	0	4	X	11
Spain (Pérez)	0	1	0	0	0	1	0	X	2

Sheet C	1	2	3	4	5	6	7	8	Final
China (Han)	0	2	0	1	1	0	1	2	7
Japan (Yamamoto)	0	0	1	0	0	2	0	0	3

Sheet D	1	2	3	4	5	6	7	8	Final
Great Britain (Henderson)	0	1	1	0	0	0	1	X	3
United States (Strouse)	2	0	0	3	1	1	0	X	7

Sheet E	1	2	3	4	5	6	7	8	Final
Australia (Gill)	0	0	1	0	0	0	X	X	1
Canada (Marks)	2	2	0	3	1	2	X	X	10

==== Draw 8 ====
Wednesday, January 18, 9:00

Sheet A	1	2	3	4	5	6	7	8	Final
Japan (Yamamoto)	0	3	3	0	3	1	X	X	10
Spain (Pérez)	0	0	0	1	0	0	X	X	1

Sheet B	1	2	3	4	5	6	7	8	Final
Canada (Marks)	0	0	2	0	1	0	1	X	4
Great Britain (Henderson)	0	1	0	4	0	3	0	X	8

Sheet C	1	2	3	4	5	6	7	8	Final
South Korea (Ha)	0	1	0	1	0	1	1	1	5
Switzerland (Hürlimann)	1	0	1	0	1	0	0	0	3

Sheet D	1	2	3	4	5	6	7	8	Final
Australia (Gill)	0	0	2	0	0	1	1	X	4
Sweden (Moberg)	2	1	0	1	3	0	0	X	7

Sheet E	1	2	3	4	5	6	7	8	Final
China (Han)	0	0	0	1	0	1	0	1	3
United States (Strouse)	1	2	0	0	1	0	1	0	5

==== Draw 9 ====
Wednesday, January 18, 19:00

Sheet A	1	2	3	4	5	6	7	8	Final
Canada (Marks)	0	2	0	0	0	3	0	X	5
Switzerland (Hürlimann)	0	0	0	1	1	0	1	X	3

Sheet B	1	2	3	4	5	6	7	8	Final
South Korea (Ha)	2	0	0	3	0	0	1	2	8
China (Han)	0	2	2	0	1	1	0	0	6

Sheet C	1	2	3	4	5	6	7	8	Final
Sweden (Moberg)	0	1	0	0	1	0	0	X	2
Great Britain (Henderson)	0	0	1	1	0	4	1	X	7

Sheet D	1	2	3	4	5	6	7	8	Final
United States (Strouse)	0	0	3	4	2	1	X	X	10
Japan (Yamamoto)	1	1	0	0	0	0	X	X	2

Sheet E	1	2	3	4	5	6	7	8	Final
Spain (Pérez)	1	0	2	2	0	0	1	1	7
Australia (Gill)	0	1	0	0	0	4	0	0	5

=== Playoffs ===
Semifinals
1	South Korea	10
4	Great Britain	4
2	United States	5
3	China	6

Final
1	South Korea	4
3	China	6
Bronze medal game
4	Great Britain	3
2	United States	7

==== Semifinals ====
Thursday, January 19, 14:00

Sheet B	1	2	3	4	5	6	7	8	Final
South Korea (Ha)	4	0	0	4	0	2	X	X	10
Great Britain (Henderson)	0	2	1	0	1	0	X	X	4

Player percentages
South Korea		Great Britain	
Kim Su-jin	73%	Laura Watt	81%
Yang Tae-i	98%	Holly Wilkie-Milne	52%
Kim Hye-rin	81%	Robyn Munro	69%
Ha Seung-youn	85%	Fay Henderson	73%
Total	84%	Total	69%

Sheet D	1	2	3	4	5	6	7	8	Final
United States (Strouse)	1	0	2	1	0	0	1	0	5
China (Han)	0	2	0	0	1	2	0	1	6

Player percentages
United States		China	
Rebecca Rodgers	73%	Jiang Jiayi	81%
Sydney Mullaney	88%	Zhu Zihui	81%
Anne O'Hara	70%	Dong Ziqi	64%
Delaney Strouse	70%	Han Yu	78%
Total	75%	Total	76%

==== Bronze medal game ====
Friday, January 20, 14:00

Sheet C	1	2	3	4	5	6	7	8	Final
Great Britain (Henderson)	0	0	0	2	0	1	0	X	3
United States (Strouse)	0	3	2	0	2	0	0	X	7

Player percentages
Great Britain		United States	
Laura Watt	77%	Rebecca Rodgers	84%
Holly Wilkie-Milne	84%	Sydney Mullaney	85%
Robyn Munro	82%	Anne O'Hara	88%
Fay Henderson	63%	Delaney Strouse	91%
Total	76%	Total	87%

==== Final ====
Saturday, January 21, 19:00

Sheet C	1	2	3	4	5	6	7	8	Final
South Korea (Ha)	1	2	0	1	0	0	0	0	4
China (Han)	0	0	1	0	1	2	1	1	6

Player percentages
South Korea		China	
Kim Su-jin	78%	Jiang Jiayi	84%
Yang Tae-i	67%	Zhu Zihui	70%
Kim Hye-rin	78%	Dong Ziqi	81%
Ha Seung-youn	59%	Han Yu	80%
Total	71%	Total	79%

=== Final standings ===
Place	Team
1st place, gold medalist(s)	China
2nd place, silver medalist(s)	South Korea
3rd place, bronze medalist(s)	United States
4	Great Britain
5	Sweden
6	Switzerland
7	Canada
8	Japan
9	Spain
10	Australia
