= Mykhailo Kharuk =

Ukrainian snowboarder

Personal information
- Full name: Михайло Михайлович Харук
- Born: 29 July 1999 (age 26) Iltsi, Ivano-Frankivsk oblast, Ukraine

Sport
- Sport: Skiing
Medal record
Men's snowboarding
Representing Ukraine
Winter Universiade
Gold medal – first place	2023 Lake Placid	Parallel giant slalom
Bronze medal – third place	2023 Lake Placid	Parallel slalom
World Junior Championships
Gold medal – first place	2019 Rogla	Parallel slalom
- Updated on 23 February 2024

Mykhailo Mykhailovych Kharuk (Ukrainian: Михайло Михайлович Харук; born 29 July 1999 in Iltsi) is a Ukrainian snowboarder, specializing in slalom. He's twice 2023 Winter Universiade medalist in parallel slalom (bronze) and parallel giant slalom (gold) events.

== Early life and education ==
He was born on 29 July 1999 in village Iltsi at the Carpathians in Ivano-Frankivsk oblast. Mykhailo studied at the Ivano-Frankivsk College of Physical Education. He studies at the National University of Ukraine on Physical Education and Sport in Kyiv.

== Career ==
He debuted competing in FIS events at the national championships in Krasiya in Ukraine in 2015.

In 2016, he firstly competed at the FIS Snowboarding Junior World Championships, held in Rogla without reaching a qualification in parallel slalom and parallel giant slalom events.

In 2017, he debuted competing at the World Cup event in Carezza, reaching 65th place.

The following years, Mykhailo became a world junior champion at the 2019 Snowboarding Junior World Championships, held in Rogla, in parallel slalom event.

In 2020, Mykhailo won a silver medal at the European Cup stage in Gudauri, Georgia.

Later, he began competing at the 2021 World Snowboarding Championships in parallel slalom and parallel giant slalom events without reaching any medals.

In 2021/22 season, he won a silver medal in parallel slamom at the European Cup stage in Czech Republic.

In 2023, Mykhailo won a gold medal in parallel giant slalom at the 2023 Winter Universiade in Lake Placid. It was the first gold medal for Ukrainian national team at this Winter Universiade. He dedicated his win to his friend, scout-sniper Oleg Mazur, dead during the Russian invasion of Ukraine. Later, he won a bronze medal in parallel slamom at this Winter Universiade.

He also won a gold medal in parallel giant slalom at the European Cup stage in Austria.

In 2024, Mykhailo firstly won a gold medal at the European Cup stage in Bulgaria in parallel giant slalom event.
