= Nadiia Hapatyn =

Ukrainian freestyle skier

Personal information
- Full name: Надія Михайлівна Гапатин
- Born: 1 October 2003 (age 22) Yasinia, Zakarpattia Oblast, Ukraine

Sport
- Sport: Skiing
Medal record
Women's freestyle skiing
Representing Ukraine
Winter Universiade
Bronze medal – third place	2023 Lake Placid	Parallel slalom
- Updated on 23 February 2024

Nadiia Mykhailivna Hapatyn (Ukrainian: Надія Михайлівна Гапатин; born 1 October 2003 in Yasinia) is a Ukrainian freestyle skier, specializing in slalom. She is a bronze medalist of 2023 Winter Universiade in parallel slalom event.

== Early life and education ==
She was born on 1 October 2003 in Yasinia in Zakarpattia Oblast. She currently studies at the Uzhhorod National University in law department.

== Career ==
In 2023, Nadiia won a bronze medal in parallel slalom event at the 2023 Winter Universiade in Lake Placid. Later, she firstly received a silver medal at the European Cup stage in Italy in parallel slalom event.

In 2024, Nadiia won silver and bronze medals in parallel slalom event at the European Cup stages in Italy and Bulgaria respectively.
