= Snowboarding at the 2023 Winter World University Games =

Snowboard competition

Snowboarding at the Lake Placid 2023 FISU World University Games
- Venue: Gore Mountain
- Dates: 12–22 January 2023

Snowboarding at the 2023 Winter World University Games was held at Gore Mountain from 12 to 22 January 2023.

== Men's events ==
Event	Gold		Silver		Bronze	
Big air	Yusei Kaku; Japan	172.00	Moritz Breu; Germany	170.25	Atsuhiro Suzuki; Japan	165.00
Slopestyle	Lee Min-sik; South Korea	90.00	Haruhi Tsuji; Japan	88.00	Atsuhiro Suzuki; Japan	80.00
Parallel giant slalom	Mykhailo Kharuk; Ukraine		Matthäus Pink; Austria		Hong Seung-yeong; South Korea	
Parallel slalom	Matthäus Pink; Austria		Dominik Burgstaller; Austria		Mykhailo Kharuk; Ukraine	
Snowboard cross	Benjamin Gattaz; France		Jakub Žerava; Czech Republic		Leon Beckhaus; Germany	

== Women's events ==
Event	Gold		Silver		Bronze	
Big air	Livia Tanno; Switzerland	172.50	Hikari Yoshizawa; Japan	152.50	Noémie Equy; France	136.00
Slopestyle	Livia Tanno; Switzerland	90.00	Noémie Equy; France	68.50	Tinkara Tanja Valcl; Slovenia	52.25
Parallel giant slalom	Elisa Fava; Italy		Carmen Kainz; Austria		Flurina Baetschi; Switzerland	
Parallel slalom	Carmen Kainz; Austria		Flurina Baetschi; Switzerland		Nadiia Hapatyn; Ukraine	
Snowboard cross	Sophie Hediger; Switzerland		Chloé Passerat; France		Kim Martinez; France	

== Medal table ==
Rank	Nation	Gold	Silver	Bronze	Total
1	Switzerland	3	1	1	5
2	Austria	2	3	0	5
3	France	1	2	2	5
3	Japan	1	2	2	5
5	Ukraine	1	0	2	3
6	South Korea	1	0	1	2
7	Italy	1	0	0	1
8	Germany	0	1	1	2
9	Czech Republic	0	1	0	1
10	Slovenia	0	0	1	1
Totals (10 entries)		10	10	10	30

== Participating nations ==
26 nations participated.

- Argentina (1)
- Armenia (1)
- Australia (2)
- Austria (5)
- Bulgaria (1)
- Canada (8)
- China (8)
- Czech Republic (8)
- Finland (1)
- France (11)
- Germany (6)
- Great Britain (1)
- Italy (1)
- Japan (14)
- Kazakhstan (2)
- Mongolia (1)
- Netherlands (1)
- Poland (7)
- Slovakia (1)
- Slovenia (1)
- South Korea (10)
- Switzerland (7)
- Thailand (1)
- Ukraine (6)
- United States (8)
- Uzbekistan (5)
