= Biathlon at the 2023 Winter World University Games =

Biathlon competition

Biathlon at the Lake Placid 2023 FISU World University Games
- Venue: Lake Placid Olympic Sports Complex Cross Country Biathlon Center
- Dates: 14–21 January 2023

Biathlon at the 2023 Winter World University Games was held at Whiteface Mountain from 14 to 21 January 2023.

== Men's events ==
Event	Gold		Silver		Bronze	
10 km sprint	Bekentay Turlubekov; Kazakhstan	27:51.5 (0+0)	Bjorn Westervelt; United States	27:59.8 (1+1)	Alexandr Mukhin; Kazakhstan	28:13.7 (0+2)
12.5 km pursuit	Bjorn Westervelt; United States	35:38.3 (1+2+1+0)	Dmytrii Hrushchak; Ukraine	36:26.3 (0+0+0+1)	Wojciech Janik; Poland	36:46.4 (0+2+1+1)
15 km mass start	Axel Garnier; France	39:53.7 (1+0+0+0)	Alexandr Mukhin; Kazakhstan	40:18.5 (0+2+2+0)	Ørjan Moseng; Norway	40:26.0 (0+2+2+1)
15 km short individual	Vadim Kurales; Kazakhstan	42:37.4 (0+1+0+0)	Ørjan Moseng; Norway	43:20.0 (1+1+1+1)	Axel Garnier; France	43:53.9 (0+1+0+1)

== Women's events ==
Event	Gold		Silver		Bronze	
7.5 km sprint	Anna Nędza-Kubiniec; Poland	24:17.1 (0+2)	Shilo Rousseau; Canada	24:41.2 (0+1)	Tereza Jandová; Czech Republic	25:01.3 (0+2)
10 km pursuit	Shilo Rousseau; Canada	32:24.4 (1+1+0+1)	Anna Nędza-Kubiniec; Poland	33:04.5 (0+2+2+1)	Barbara Skrobiszewska; Poland	33:39.3 (0+2+1+1)
12.5 km mass start	Kristýna Otcovská; Czech Republic	41:11.6 (3+0+0+0)	Pauline Machut; France	41:32.7 (1+0+0+2)	Anna Blanc; France	41:41.1 (1+2+0+0)
12.5 km short individual	Shilo Rousseau; Canada	42:52.9 (1+0+0+1)	Barbara Skrobiszewska; Poland	43:41.3 (1+0+0+0)	Tereza Jandová; Czech Republic	43:46.6 (0+2+0+1)

== Mixed event ==
Event	Gold		Silver		Bronze	
6 km W + 7.5 km M single relay	Czech Republic Tereza Jandová; Jakub Kocián	37:25.3 (0+0) (0+0) (0+1) (0+0) (0+0) (0+1) (0+1) (0+0)	France Pauline Machut; Axel Garnier	38:02.8 (0+2) (0+1) (0+2) (0+2) (0+2) (0+0) (0+0) (0+1)	Ukraine Yuliia Horodna; Stepan Kinash	38:07.2 (0+2) (0+0) (0+1) (0+2) (1+3) (0+0) (0+1) (0+2)

== Medal table ==
* Host nation (United States)

Rank	Nation	Gold	Silver	Bronze	Total
1	Kazakhstan	2	1	1	4
2	Canada	2	1	0	3
3	Czech Republic	2	0	2	4
4	France	1	2	2	5
4	Poland	1	2	2	5
6	United States*	1	1	0	2
7	Norway	0	1	1	2
7	Ukraine	0	1	1	2
Totals (8 entries)		9	9	9	27

== Participating nations ==
16 nations participated.

- Australia (3)
- Canada (12)
- Czech Republic (8)
- Finland (4)
- France (4)
- Great Britain (2)
- Japan (2)
- Kazakhstan (12)
- Netherlands (1)
- Norway (4)
- Poland (8)
- Slovakia (4)
- South Korea (1)
- Switzerland (2)
- Ukraine (8)
- United States (10)
