= Shilo Rousseau =

Canadian biathlete (born 2000)

Personal information
- National team: Canada
- Born: July 24, 2000 (age 26) Elliot Lake, Ontario
- Home town: Thessalon, Ontario

Sport
- Sport: Biathlon

Shilo Rousseau (born July 24, 2000) is a Canadian biathlete who represented Canada at the 2026 Winter Olympics.

Rousseau was born in Elliot Lake, Ontario, and was raised in Thessalon. As a child she skied at the Blind River and was introduced to biathlon by her father when she was 12 years old. She graduated with a degree in biology from the University of Ottawa and was a valedictorian of the Faculty of Science.

During the 2025–26 Biathlon World Cup, she displayed a rainbow flag design on her rifle to express her LGBTQ identity. She was asked to cover the design in order to participate because of the International Biathlon Union's policy on advertising and political statements. This sparked a discussion between the International Biathlon Union, Biathlon Canada, and the Biathlon Integrity Unit. Rousseau was ultimately allowed to compete with the rainbow design. Rousseau participated in the 2026 Winter Olympics in Italy. She used her rainbow rifle design again at the Olympics. She placed 78th in the women's individual event, 80th in the women's sprint event, and did not finish the women's relay event.
