= Alpine skiing at the 2023 Winter World University Games =

Alpine skiing competition

Alpine skiing at the Lake Placid 2023 FISU World University Games
- Venue: Whiteface Mountain
- Dates: 13–21 January 2023

Alpine skiing at the 2023 Winter World University Games was held at Whiteface Mountain from 13 to 21 January 2023.

== Men's events ==
Event	Gold		Silver		Bronze	
Super-G	Jan Zabystřan; Czech Republic	58.35	Luca Taranzano; Italy	58.76	Eric Wyler; Switzerland	58.77
Combined	Albert Ortega; Spain	1:42.88	Andrej Drukarov; Lithuania	1:43.37	Jan Zabystřan; Czech Republic	1:43.38
Giant slalom	Jan Zabystřan; Czech Republic	2:01.23	Eric Wyler; Switzerland	2:02.57	Jérémie Lagier; France	2:02.93
Slalom	Jan Zabystřan; Czech Republic	1:51.38	Jérémie Lagier; France	1:51.43	Jacob Dilling; United States	1:51.47

== Women's events ==
Event	Gold		Silver		Bronze	
Super-G	Fabiana Dorigo; Germany	52.18	Carmen Sofie Nielssen; Norway	52.65	Celia Abad; Spain	52.79
Combined	Celia Abad; Spain	1:42.13	Julia Socquet Dagoreau; France	1:42.59	Leonie Flötgen; Germany	1:43.05
Giant slalom	Leonie Flötgen; Germany	2:07.04	Fabiana Dorigo; Germany	2:07.18	Emma Hammergård; Sweden	2:07.76
Slalom	Carlotta Marcora; Italy	1:54.25	Valentine Macheret; Switzerland	1:55.39	Sara Rask; Sweden	1:55.51

== Team event ==
Event	Gold	Silver	Bronze
Mixed team parallel	Sweden; Gustav Dalmalm; Evelina Fredricsson; Sara Rask; Wilhelm Vänje	Switzerland; Morris Blom; Aaron Mayer; Domenica Mosca; Svenja Pfiffner	Germany; Fabiana Dorigo; Leonie Flötgen; Roman Frost; Maximilian Haußmann

== Medal table ==
* Host nation (United States)

Rank	Nation	Gold	Silver	Bronze	Total
1	Czech Republic	3	0	1	4
2	Germany	2	1	2	5
3	Spain	2	0	1	3
4	Italy	1	1	0	2
5	Sweden	1	0	2	3
6	Switzerland	0	3	1	4
7	France	0	2	1	3
8	Lithuania	0	1	0	1
8	Norway	0	1	0	1
10	United States*	0	0	1	1
Totals (10 entries)		9	9	9	27

== Participating nations ==
37 nations participated.

- Armenia (1)
- Australia (4)
- Austria (8)
- Belgium (4)
- Brazil (1)
- Bulgaria (1)
- Canada (12)
- Chinese Taipei (2)
- Czech Republic (8)
- Denmark (2)
- Estonia (1)
- Finland (3)
- France (7)
- Germany (8)
- Hungary (5)
- Iceland (1)
- Ireland (5)
- Italy (14)
- Japan (6)
- Kazakhstan (2)
- Latvia (1)
- Lithuania (1)
- Luxembourg (1)
- Mongolia (2)
- Netherlands (1)
- Norway (7)
- Philippines (2)
- Poland (6)
- Slovakia (6)
- South Korea (6)
- Spain (3)
- Sweden (12)
- Switzerland (15)
- Thailand (2)
- Ukraine (4)
- United States (18)
- Uzbekistan (6)
