= Gore Mountain (ski resort) =

Ski area in New York, United States

Gore Mountain Resort
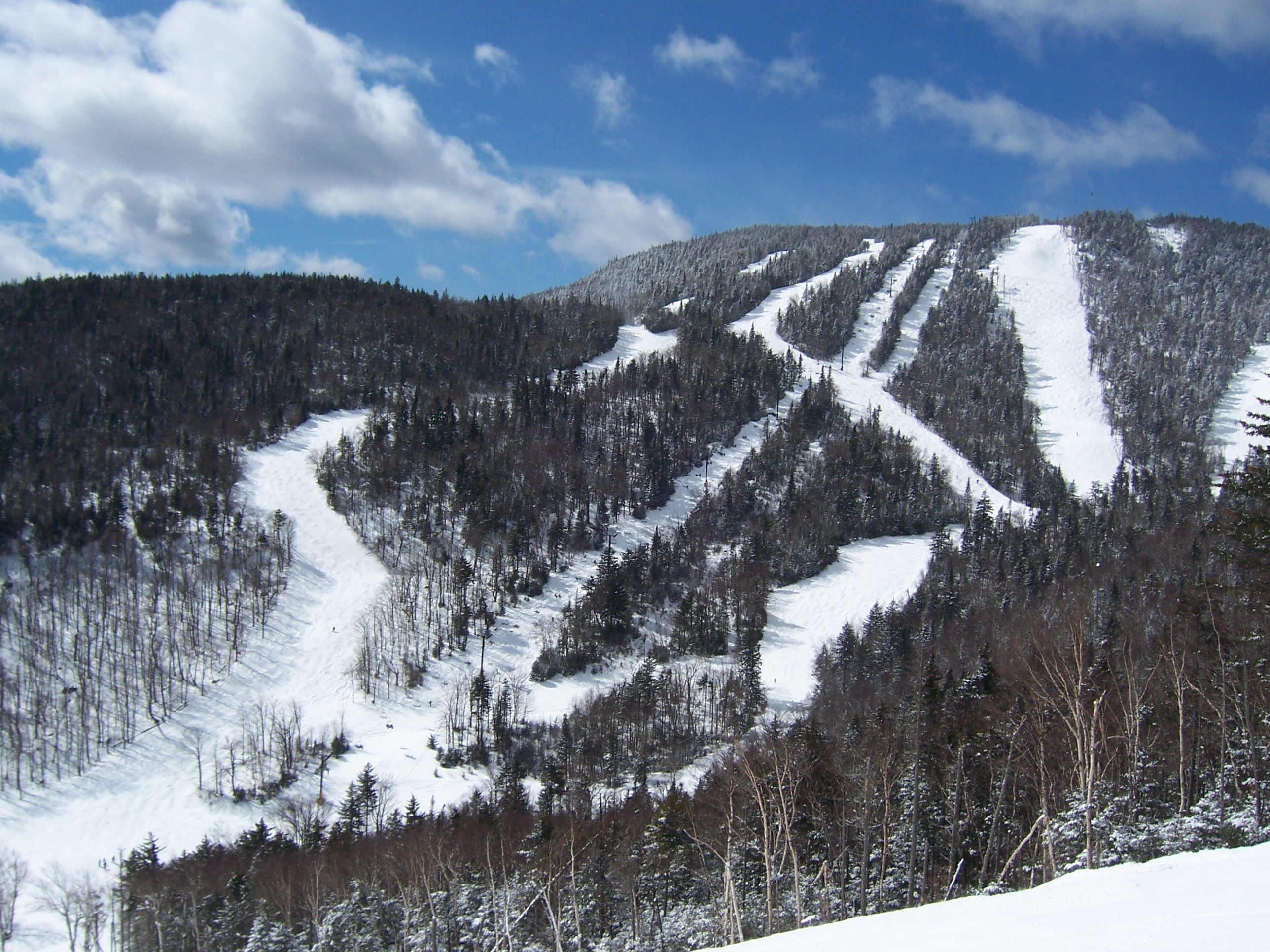
- A view of part of Gore's summit from the Uncas trail.
- Interactive map of Gore Mountain Resort
- Location: North Creek, New York
- Mountain: Gore Mountain
- Nearest city: Glens Falls, New York
- Coordinates: 43°40′20″N 74°00′25″W
- Status: Operating
- Owner: Olympic Regional Development Authority
- Vertical: 2,537 ft (773 m)
- Top elevation: 3,600 ft (1,100 m)
- Base elevation: 998 ft (304 m)
- Skiable area: 428 acres (173 ha)
- Trails: 110
- Longest run: 3.7 m (12 ft)
- Lift system: 14 total (1 8-passenger gondola, 3 high-speed quads, 5 quads, 1 triple, 3 surface lifts)
- Terrain parks: Yes, 4
- Snowfall: 150 inches (3.8 m) / year
- Snowmaking: Yes, 97%
- Night skiing: Yes
- Website: goremountain.com

Gore Mountain is an alpine ski resort on Gore Mountain in the Adirondack Mountains, located in North Creek, New York. The mountain is a popular winter destination, attracting skiers from all over the east. It is the largest ski area in New York and is located about one hour from the Capital District (Albany) metro area.

Gore Mountain is one of three ski areas owned by The People of the State of New York. The three areas are operated by the Olympic Regional Development Authority (ORDA), a state agency.

Gore Mountain has 108 trails and 14 lifts: nine chairlifts, one gondola lift, one J-bar lift, and two magic carpets. Gore mountain has a wide variety of alpine terrain catering to alpine skiers of all levels. Gore also has 12 Nordic trails for cross country skiing.

The ski train to North Creek, which had not operated since the 1940s, was revived in 2011 under the Saratoga and North Creek Railroad, running from the Saratoga Springs Amtrak station to the North Creek depot. Service was discontinued in 2017.

Road access to Gore Mountain is via route NY 28.

== History ==
Skiers first began using Gore Mountain in 1934 when a ski excursion train brought visitors to the North Creek Depot. The lower mountain or "Old Gore" was later improved through the addition of "New Gore" in 1964. The two resorts operated independently from one another until 2003 when ORDA reintroduced operations at Old Gore which had ceased in the 1980s. Gore Mountain has recently expanded its resort limits to combine with the historic North Creek Ski Bowl (Old Gore). In 2008-2009 ski season Gore added 5 new runs to the mountain as it completed its Burnt Ridge expansion. This new quad offers skiers an opportunity to ski four new glades, two intermediate trails and one expert run. This expansion coincided with an expansion at the state run Whiteface Mountain Ski Area.

Gore Mountain was voted in the "Top 10 for Value" by Ski Magazine in 2006.

In the 2010-2011 season, Gore opened a connector called Little Gore Mountain, including a beginner trail called "Peaceful Valley," four intermediate leveled trails called "Pipeline", "Eagle's Nest," "Oak Ridge Trail" and "Moxham," an intermediate glade called "Half and Half" and an expert trail called "46er." Now one can reach the bottom of the Ski Bowl and return via Peaceful Valley and Eagle's Nest without having to take the shuttle back to the main mountain.

== Mountain ==
Gore consists of four peaks (Gore, Bear, Burnt Ridge, and Little Gore mountains). The three smaller peaks are below Gore, so the peaks are not separate.

The summit area (Gore Mountain) contains the Straightbrook and High Peaks areas, on either end of the summit ridge that the Cloud trail follows. Straightbrook is served by a quad chairlift to the Gore summit and contains The Rumor, the resort's steepest trail which is also usually considered the most difficult. The Straightbrook Quad is just south of the lift line of Gore's old gondola, which went from base to summit when it operated (from 1967 to 1999). Under the two lift lines is the Double Barrel glade. Like The Rumor, which is on the same slope, Double Barrel is double-black-diamond terrain. Its difficulty is compounded by the fact that it is often filled with boulders and moguls. The popular Chatiemac trail on the south side of Straight Brook is used to access several marked glades and unmarked backcountry trails. The High Peaks area is on the other side of the summit and is now served by a quad chair. It is known for its expert trails and glades.

Bear Mountain's south, east, and north sides contain the Topridge, Northwoods, and North Side areas, respectively. The Northwoods Area is the lower mountain and base trail area, wholly containing the Northwoods Gondola. The Northwoods area is also served by the Adirondack Express II, a high-speed quad chairlift (built in 2014). It replaced a high-speed triple chair built in 1984, which was the only high-speed triple in the eastern USA. While the gondola reaches the summit of Bear Mountain, the AEII reaches slightly below this to an area called the Saddle (where the Saddle Lodge is located), providing access to most of the Northwoods and all of the North Side. Two quad chairs serve the southern part of Northwoods, along with three small surface and J-lifts around the base. Twister, an intermediate trail in Northwoods, is the resort's longest run and most-used racing course. The North Side is served by a quad and contains several easier trails. Additionally, it provides direct access from the Saddle to the High Peaks area (via Lower Wood In) and North Creek Ski Bowl (via Pipeline).

The Topridge area is served by a quad. Its most prominent trails are Topridge, Uncas, and Pine Knot, the latter two of which are heavily used as connecters from the Bear Mountain summit (the top of the gondola) to the Straight Brook Quad. The Cave Glades, located in the Topridge area, are named for a large cave found along them. The Tannery trail, which is used to access the Topridge area from the Straightbrook chair and originally led to the main (Northwoods) base, has been closed below the Topridge chair since the 1990s and is today only used as an access road.

The Burnt Ridge Area is one of Gore's newest. It is served by an express quad chairlift, the Burnt Ridge Quad. From the summit of Burnt Ridge Mountain, the Sagamore (black diamond, or double black in some conditions) and Echo (blue square) trails are most popular. When open, the Barkeater Glades provide a link to the Ski Bowl, but these are now bifurcated by the new Backwoods intermediate trail to provide an easier connection. The Hedges links the Burnt Ridge summit to the North Side via the Tahawus Glades. Burnt Ridge can be reached either by Cedars Traverse from the Northwoods area or by Eagle's Nest from the North Side or Ski Bowl. The Burnt Ridge Quad also services the Cirque Glades, the longest glade in the east.

The most recent development at Gore has been focused on the Ski Bowl. It is served by the short Village triple and the Hudson chair (currently a triple but being replaced by a high-speed quad for 2024-25). The upper part of the Ski Bowl, including the Hudson Chair, was completed for the 2010-11 season. Although it had lift service when it was opened in 1946, the ski bowl did not have a chairlift until the Village Chair was installed in 2007. The ski bowl now has alpine skiing, Nordic skiing and night skiing, a terrain park and half-pipe. New glades were developed for the upper area for the 2011-12 season, but were not open for long due to the lack of snow that season.

=== Trail names ===
The theme for trail names throughout most of Gore is locations in the Adirondacks, particularly the names of the Adirondack Great Camps. These include:

- Hedges, after the camp (now a beloved resort) on Blue Mountain Lake
- Pine Knot, after Camp Pine Knot
- Wild Air, after Camp Wild Air
- Echo, after Echo Camp
- Topridge, after Camp Topridge
- Uncas, after Camp Uncas
- Santanoni, after the Santanoni Preserve
- Sagamore, after Sagamore Camp
- Back Woods, after the old ski club
- Fairview, after Camp Fairview
- The Cedars, after Camp Cedars
- Tahawus, after the ghost town of the same name
- Mica and Ruby Run are both references to minerals mined nearby.
- The Glen, after a hamlet in Thurman
- Headwaters after the headwaters of the Hudson River, which are near Gore
- 46er, after the 46 Adirondack High Peaks
- Pete Gay, after a nearby mountain of the same name
- Chatiemac and Straight Brook, the latter of which is the name of a lift, glade, and area, are both named after nearby brooks.

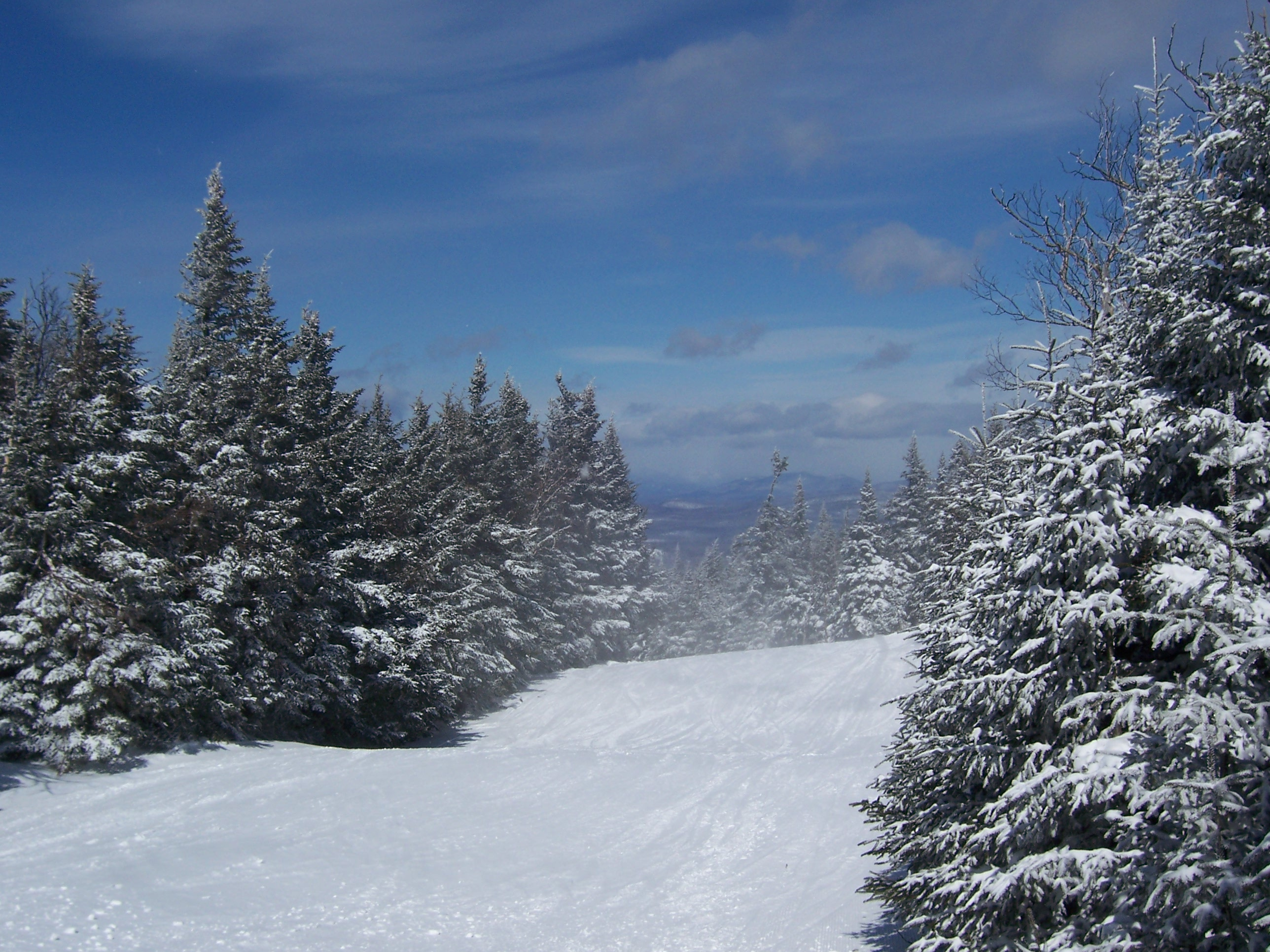
The Gore Mountain trail "Upper Steilhang"

== See Also ==
- GORO Mountain Resort - Ski resort in Carpathians, Ukraine.
