= 2023 Winter World University Games =

Multi-sport event in Lake Placid, New York, US

- Time to Shine
- Host city: Lake Placid, New York, United States
- Nations: 46
- Athletes: 1443 (832 men, 611 women).
- Events: 85 in 12 sports
- Opening: 12 January 2023
- Closing: 22 January 2023
- Opened by: Kathy Hochul; Governor of New York
- Athlete's Oath: Ting Cui
- Judge's Oath: Dan Nardiello
- Torch lighter: James Miller, Arthur Lussi, and Nina Lussi
- Main venue: Herb Brooks Arena
- Website: lakeplacid2023.com (archived)

Winter

Summer

The Lake Placid 2023 FISU World University Games, commonly known as Lake Placid 2023, was a collegiate multi-sport winter sports held between January 12 to January 22, 2023 and had Lake Placid, New York, United States, as main host city. Alongside Lake Placid, events were also hosted by neighbouring cities of Wilmington, Saranac Lake, Potsdam and North Creek also located at the New York state. The event is also known as the 31st Winter Universiade as administered by the International University Sports Federation (FISU). The event marks the return following the previous Universiade in Lucerne initially postponed from January to November 2021 and then cancelled due to the COVID-19 pandemic.

It marked the second edition of the Games, formerly known as the Winter Universiade, to be held in Lake Placid, after the 1972 games. It was the third time that the World University Games were held in the United States after Lake Placid in 1972 and 1993 Summer Universiade in Buffalo, also in the state of New York.

== Host selection and preparation ==
The FISU, led by director Milan Augustin, inspected the Lake Placid area in June 2017, as well as nearby town of Wilmington that was a support city for the activities of the Games. Lake Placid was officially announced as the host city on March 5, 2018; the bid was called one of the strongest in the history of Universiades by FISU officials.

As the 2021 Winter Universiade was cancelled due to the COVID-19 pandemic in Switzerland, the formal handover to Lake Placid was instead held at a ceremony in Turin in January 2022. A launch event was held at Lake Placid's Mid's Park on January 23, 2022.

The games were budgeted to cost $50 million, exclusive of Public Safety costs.

== Sports ==
The Games featured a record 85 medal events in 12 sports, which is highest number of the events held in a World World University Games edition in history at that date, tying with Almaty 2017 which also had 85 events from 12 sports on its program. This edition had the current nine mandatory sports. Being the first in which freestyle skiing became a mandatory sport. By the current FISU rules, speed skating has a unique status within the FISU program, as it does not count as either a required or optional sport, and when a city adds it as an optional sport it gains the right to add an extra optional sport. In the case of Lake Placid, the choice was for the Nordic combined, as ski jumping was planned as an optional sport. This also the first time in Universiade history that women competed in the Nordic Combined.

Numbers in parentheses indicate the number of medal events contested in each sport.

- Alpine skiing (9)
- Biathlon (9)
- Cross-country skiing (11)
- Curling (2)
- Figure skating (3)
- Freestyle skiing (6)
- Ice hockey (2)
- Nordic combined (6)
- Short track speed skating (9)
- Ski jumping (5)
- Snowboarding (10)
- Speed skating (13)

== Venues ==
=== Lake Placid ===
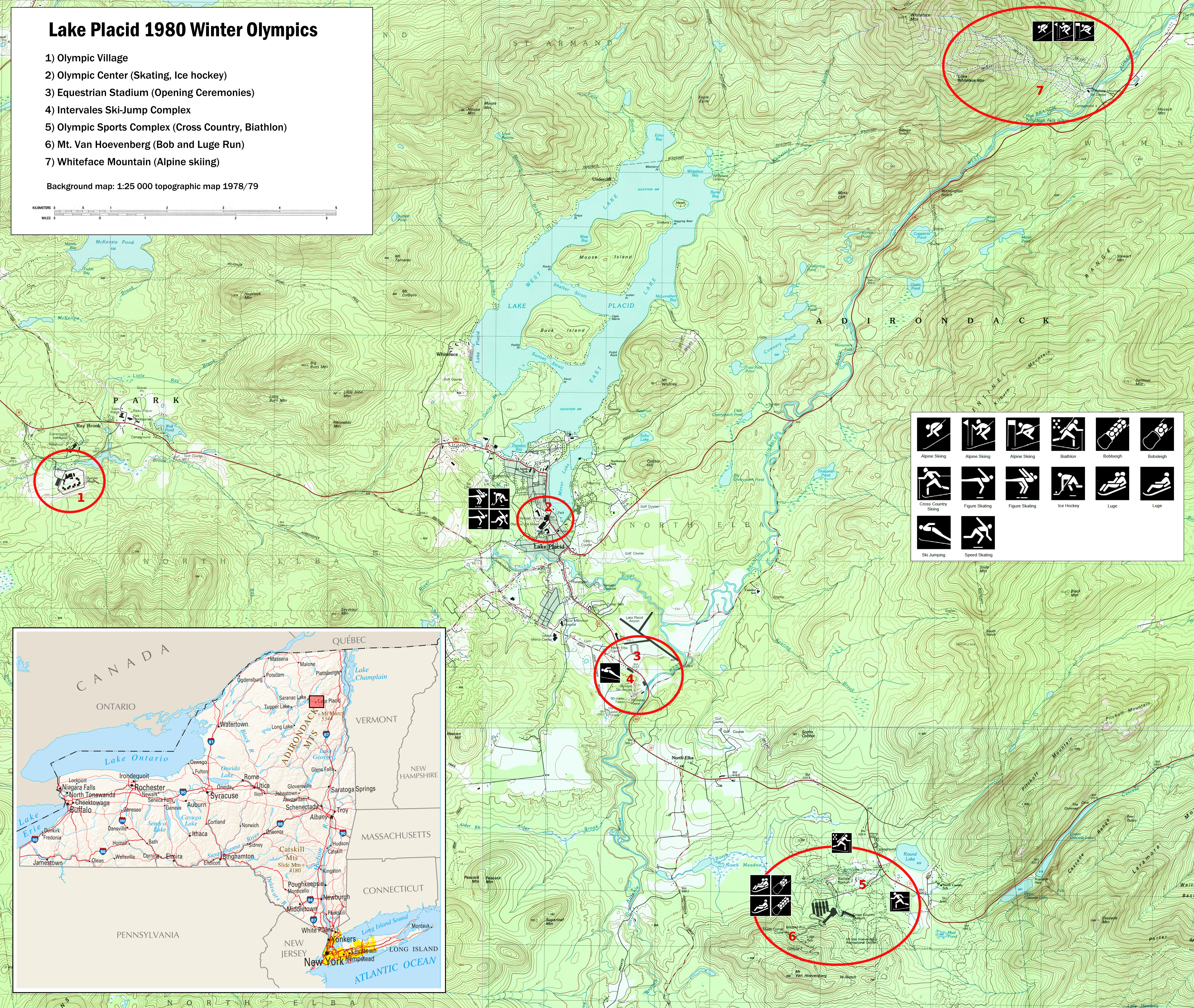
Map of the venues in Lake Placid

- Intervales Ski-Hill – Nordic combined (ski jumping), Ski jumping
- Lake Placid Olympic Sports Complex Cross Country Biathlon Center – Biathlon, Cross-country skiing, Nordic combined (Cross-country skiing)
- Olympic Center – Figure skating, Ice hockey (finals) Opening and closing ceremonies
- James B. Sheffield Speed Skating Oval – Speed skating
- Whiteface Mountain – Alpine skiing
- Jack Shea Speed Skating Track – Speed skating

=== Saranac Lake ===
- Saranac Lake Civic Center – Curling

=== Potsdam ===
- Cheel Arena – Ice hockey (finals)
- Maxcy Hall Ice Arena- Ice hockey

=== Canton ===
- Athletic and Recreation Center at State University of New York at Canton - Ice hockey

=== North Creek ===
- Gore Mountain-Freestyle skiing and snowboarding

== Medal table ==
A total of 25 delegations won at least one medal. Thailand was the first ever tropical nation to won medals in a Winter World University Games.

* Host nation (United States)

Rank	Nation	Gold	Silver	Bronze	Total
1	Japan	21	17	10	48
2	South Korea	12	8	9	29
3	Canada	6	1	6	13
4	France	5	6	7	18
5	Poland	5	6	6	17
6	Czech Republic	5	1	6	12
7	Finland	4	1	2	7
8	United States*	3	8	6	17
9	Switzerland	3	6	2	11
10	Germany	3	4	6	13
11	Kazakhstan	3	4	4	11
12	Austria	3	4	1	8
13	Italy	3	3	4	10
14	Estonia	2	2	0	4
15	Spain	2	1	2	5
16	Great Britain	2	0	1	3
17	China	1	2	1	4
18	Ukraine	1	1	4	6
19	Sweden	1	0	2	3
20	Norway	0	7	3	10
21	Thailand	0	1	1	2
22	Lithuania	0	1	0	1
22	Slovakia	0	1	0	1
24	Netherlands	0	0	1	1
24	Slovenia	0	0	1	1
Totals (25 entries)		85	85	85	255

== Schedule ==
OC	Opening ceremony	●	Event competitions	1	Event finals	CC	Closing ceremony

January	11 Wed	12 Thu	13 Fri	14 Sat	15 Sun	16 Mon	17 Tue	18 Wed	19 Thu	20 Fri	21 Sat	22 Sun	Events
Ceremonies		OC										CC	
Alpine skiing				2	●	2	1	1	1	1	1		9
Biathlon				2		1		2	2		2		9
Cross-country skiing			1		2		2	2		2		2	11
Curling			●	●	●	●	●	●	●	●	2		2
Figure skating			●	1	2								3
Freestyle skiing					●	2	●	2	●	2			6
Ice hockey	●	●	●	●	●	●	●	●	●	●	1	1	2
Nordic combined			2		2		1		1				6
Short track speed skating									2	3	4		9
Ski jumping						2		1		2			5
Snowboarding		●	2				●	2	●	2	2	2	10
Speed skating					2	2	2	2	3	2			13
Total events			5	5	8	9	6	12	9	14	12	5	85
Cumulative total			5	10	18	27	33	45	54	68	80	85	85
January	11 Wed	12 Thu	13 Fri	14 Sat	15 Sun	16 Mon	17 Tue	18 Wed	19 Thu	20 Fri	21 Sat	22 Sun	Events

== Participating nations ==
46 National University Sports Federations (NUSFs) registered a total of 1,443 athletes to compete in the games. Haiti made its Winter World University Games debut.

- Argentina (2)
- Armenia (6)
- Australia (25)
- Austria
- Belgium (4)
- Brazil (6)
- Bulgaria (5)
- Canada (121)
- China
- Croatia (1)
- Czech Republic (94)
- Denmark (2)
- Estonia (5)
- Finland
- France
- Germany
- Great Britain
- Haiti (1)
- Hong Kong
- Hungary
- Iceland
- Ireland
- Italy
- Japan (139)
- Kazakhstan
- Latvia
- Lithuania (4)
- Luxembourg (1)
- Mexico (1)
- Mongolia
- Netherlands
- Norway
- Philippines (4)
- Poland (55)
- South Korea (85)
- Slovakia
- Slovenia
- Spain
- Sweden
- Switzerland (55)
- Chinese Taipei (2)
- Thailand (7)
- Turkey (3)
- Ukraine (58)
- United States (150) (Hosts)
- Uzbekistan (12)

== Marketing ==
=== Mascot ===
The official mascot of the Games—a moose named Adirondack Mac—was unveiled on November 14, 2021. Designed by Fashion Institute of Technology student Kristina Ingerowski, it was selected following a public vote and submission process, and named after the Adirondack Mountains.

== Broadcasting ==
In August 2022, it was announced that ESPN would hold the U.S. media rights to the Games, with coverage to be carried by ESPN2 and ESPNU. ESPN's partner TSN holds the Canadian media rights via this agreement. FISU.tv is the international broadcaster of the Games, but geo-blocked in the United States and Canada.
