= 2025–26 FIS Nordic Combined World Cup =

2025–26 season for world cup Nordic combined

Discipline	Men	Women
Overall	(Austria) Johannes Lamparter (2)	(Norway) Ida Marie Hagen (2)
Nations Cup	Austria (6)	Norway (5)
Best Jumper Trophy	(Austria) Thomas Rettenegger (1)	(Norway) Ingrid Låte (1)
Best Skier Trophy	(Norway) Jens Lurås Oftebro (3)	(Norway) Ida Marie Hagen (4)
Compact Trophy	(Austria) Johannes Lamparter (1)	(Norway) Ida Marie Hagen (2)
Mass Start Trophy	(Austria) Johannes Lamparter (1)	(Norway) Ida Marie Hagen (1)

Stage events
Ruka Tour	(Austria) Johannes Lamparter (1)	—
Triple	(Norway) Jens Lurås Oftebro (1)	(Norway) Ida Marie Hagen (1)

Competition
Edition	43rd	6th
Locations	9	7
Individual	17	14
Mixed	1	1
Cancelled	3	2

The 2025–26 FIS Nordic Combined World Cup, organized by the International Ski Federation (FIS), was the 43rd World Cup season for men and the 6th season for women as the highest level of international Nordic combined competitions.

The men's season started on 28 November 2025 in Ruka, Finland and ended on 15 March 2026 in Oslo–Holmenkollen, Norway. The women's season started on 5 December 2025 in Trondheim, Norway and ended on 15 March 2026 in Oslo–Holmenkollen, Norway.

A major highlight of the season for men was the 2026 Winter Olympics, held in Milan–Cortina, Italy, from 11 to 19 February, with the Nordic combined events taking place in Val di Fiemme. The results from these competitions weren't included in the World Cup standings.

Vinzenz Geiger (men's) and Nathalie Armbruster (women's), both from Germany, were the reigning champions from the previous season.

== Season overview ==
A significant development for the 2025–26 season was the introduction of the first-ever men’s ski flying event in Nordic combined, that took place at the Kulm in Bad Mitterndorf, Austria.

Additionally, FIS announced an increase in prize money and the implementation of full gender parity in the overall World Cup prize funds.

== Map of world cup hosts ==
Europe

Location of all 10 World Cup hosts of the season

== Men ==
Individual events in the World Cup history

Total	GUN–L	GUN–N	MSS	COM	COM-F	GU	Sp	Pen	Hsp	Csp	Winners
649	157	112	34	13	1	239	86	4	2	1	79

after Gundersen in Oslo (15 March 2026)

=== Calendar ===
Event key: GUN – Gundersen / COM – Compact / MSS – Mass Start
All	No.	Date	Place (Hill)	Discipline	Winner	Second	Third	Overall Leader	R.
633	1	28 November 2025	(Finland) Ruka (Rukatunturi HS142)	7,5 km COM _{010}	(Austria) Johannes Lamparter	(Germany) Julian Schmid	(Finland) Ilkka Herola	(Austria) Johannes Lamparter	
634	2	29 November 2025	(Finland) Ruka (Rukatunturi HS142)	10 km GUN _{154}	(Austria) Johannes Lamparter	(Germany) Julian Schmid	(Austria) Thomas Rettenegger	(Austria) Johannes Lamparter	
—		30 November 2025	(Finland) Ruka (Rukatunturi HS142)	10 km MSS _{cnx}	cancelled due to strong wind			—	
8th Ruka Tour Overall (28 – 30 November 2025)					(Austria) Johannes Lamparter	(Germany) Julian Schmid	(Finland) Ilkka Herola		
635	3	6 December 2025	(Norway) Trondheim (Granåsen HS102/HS138)	10 km MSS _{031}	(Austria) Thomas Rettenegger	(Germany) Wendelin Thannheimer	(Austria) Franz-Josef Rehrl	(Austria) Johannes Lamparter	
636	4	7 December 2025	(Norway) Trondheim (Granåsen HS102/HS138)	10 km GUN _{155}	(Austria) Johannes Lamparter	(Austria) Franz-Josef Rehrl	(Germany) Julian Schmid	(Austria) Johannes Lamparter	
637	5	19 December 2025	(Austria) Ramsau (W90-Mattensprunganlage HS98)	10 km MSS _{032}	(Austria) Thomas Rettenegger	(Norway) Jens Lurås Oftebro	(Austria) Stefan Rettenegger	(Austria) Johannes Lamparter	
638	6	20 December 2025	(Austria) Ramsau (W90-Mattensprunganlage HS98)	10 km GUN _{109}	(Germany) Vinzenz Geiger	(Norway) Jens Lurås Oftebro	(Austria) Johannes Lamparter	(Austria) Johannes Lamparter	
—		3 January 2026	(Germany) Schonach (Langenwaldschanze HS100)	10 km GUN	cancelled due to bad weather conditions			—	
—		4 January 2026	(Germany) Schonach (Langenwaldschanze HS100)	7.5 km COM	cancelled due to bad weather conditions			—	
639	7	(Note: Ski Jumping competition round cancelled due to wind condition – PCR II used as official jumping result.)9 January 2026	(Estonia) Otepää (Tehvandi HS97)	10 km MSS _{033}	(Germany) Julian Schmid	(Austria) Johannes Lamparter	(Norway) Einar Lurås Oftebro	(Austria) Johannes Lamparter	
640	8	(Note: Ski Jumping competition round cancelled due to wind condition – PCR I used as official jumping result.)10 January 2026	(Estonia) Otepää (Tehvandi HS97)	10 km GUN _{110}	(Norway) Einar Lurås Oftebro	(Germany) Johannes Rydzek	(Norway) Andreas Skoglund	(Austria) Johannes Lamparter	
641	9	11 January 2026	(Estonia) Otepää (Tehvandi HS97)	7.5 km COM _{011}	(Austria) Johannes Lamparter	(Germany) Johannes Rydzek	(Germany) Vinzenz Geiger	(Austria) Johannes Lamparter	
642	10	17 January 2026	(Germany) Oberhof (Kanzlersgrund HS100)	7.5 km COM _{012}	(Norway) Jens Lurås Oftebro	(Austria) Johannes Lamparter	(Norway) Einar Lurås Oftebro	(Austria) Johannes Lamparter	
643	11	18 January 2026	(Germany) Oberhof (Kanzlersgrund HS100)	10 km GUN _{111}	(Norway) Jens Lurås Oftebro	(Norway) Einar Lurås Oftebro	(Germany) Julian Schmid	(Austria) Johannes Lamparter	
644	12	30 January 2026	(Austria) Seefeld (Toni-Seelos-Olympiaschanze HS109)	10 km MSS _{034}	(Austria) Johannes Lamparter	(Austria) Stefan Rettenegger	(Norway) Andreas Skoglund	(Austria) Johannes Lamparter	
645	13	31 January 2026	(Austria) Seefeld (Toni-Seelos-Olympiaschanze HS109)	7.5 km COM _{013}	(Germany) Vinzenz Geiger	(Austria) Johannes Lamparter	(Norway) Jens Lurås Oftebro	(Austria) Johannes Lamparter	
646	14	1 February 2026	(Austria) Seefeld (Toni-Seelos-Olympiaschanze HS109)	12.5 km GUN _{112}	(Norway) Jens Lurås Oftebro	(Austria) Stefan Rettenegger	(Germany) Vinzenz Geiger	(Austria) Johannes Lamparter	
13th Nordic Combined Triple Overall (30 January – 1 February 2026)
2026 Winter Olympics (11–19 February • Val di Fiemme, Italy) (Note: Olympic Games are included in the World Cup calendar, but their results do not contribute to the overall World Cup standings.)
647	15	27 February 2026	(Austria) Bad Mitterndorf (Kulm HS235)	7.5 km COM _{001}	(Finland) Ilkka Herola	(Austria) Johannes Lamparter	(Germany) Johannes Rydzek	(Austria) Johannes Lamparter	
648	16	6 March 2026	(Finland) Lahti (Salpausselkä HS130)	10 km GUN _{156}	(Norway) Jens Lurås Oftebro	(Norway) Einar Lurås Oftebro	(Finland) Ilkka Herola	(Austria) Johannes Lamparter	
649	17	15 March 2026	(Norway) Oslo (Holmenkollbakken HS134)	10 km GUN _{157}	(Austria) Johannes Lamparter	(Norway) Jens Lurås Oftebro	(Norway) Einar Lurås Oftebro	(Austria) Johannes Lamparter	
43rd FIS World Cup Overall (28 November 2025 – 15 March 2026)					(Austria) Johannes Lamparter	(Norway) Jens Lurås Oftebro	(Norway) Einar Lurås Oftebro		

=== Standings ===
==== Overall ====
Rank	final standings after 17 events	Points
1	(Austria) Johannes Lamparter	1382
2	(Norway) Jens Lurås Oftebro	1229
3	(Norway) Einar Lurås Oftebro	1080
4	(Finland) Ilkka Herola	1008
5	(Germany) Julian Schmid	940
6	(Germany) Johannes Rydzek	934
7	(Austria) Thomas Rettenegger	924
8	(Austria) Stefan Rettenegger	901
9	(Germany) Vinzenz Geiger	755
10	(Norway) Andreas Skoglund	670

==== Nations Cup ====
Rank	final standings after 18 events	Points
1	Austria	5637
2	Germany	4782
3	Norway	4047
4	Finland	1870
5	Japan	797
6	France	771
7	Italy	636
8	Estonia	633
9	United States	515
10	Czech Republic	338

==== Prize money ====
Rank	final standings after 20 payouts	euro (€)
1	(Austria) Johannes Lamparter	119,640
2	(Norway) Jens Lurås Oftebro	110,326
3	(Norway) Einar Lurås Oftebro	64,796
4	(Germany) Julian Schmid	49,260
5	(Finland) Ilkka Herola	48,600
6	(Austria) Thomas Rettenegger	47,073
7	(Germany) Johannes Rydzek	44,705
8	(Austria) Stefan Rettenegger	43,350
9	(Germany) Vinzenz Geiger	39,710
10	(Germany) Wendelin Thannheimer	23,175

==== Best Jumper Trophy ====
Rank	final standings after 17 events	Points
1	(Austria) Thomas Rettenegger	1394
2	(Austria) Johannes Lamparter	1223
3	(Finland) Ilkka Herola	885
3	(Austria) Franz-Josef Rehrl	860
5	(Norway) Einar Lurås Oftebro	790

==== Best Skier Trophy ====
Rank	final standings after 17 events	Points
1	(Norway) Jens Lurås Oftebro	1433
2	(Germany) Johannes Rydzek	991
3	(Norway) Andreas Skoglund	973
4	(Austria) Stefan Rettenegger	958
5	(Norway) Einar Lurås Oftebro	949

==== Compact Trophy ====
Rank	final standings after 5 events	Points
1	(Austria) Johannes Lamparter	470
2	(Norway) Jens Lurås Oftebro	370
3	(Finland) Ilkka Herola	323
4	(Germany) Johannes Rydzek	322
5	(Norway) Einar Lurås Oftebro	311

==== Mass Start Trophy ====
Rank	final standings after 4 events	Points
1	(Austria) Johannes Lamparter	315
2	(Austria) Thomas Rettenegger	304
3	(Austria) Stefan Rettenegger	258
4	(Germany) Julian Schmid	245
5	(Norway) Jens Lurås Oftebro	236

==== Ruka Tour ====
Rank	final standings after 2 events	Points
1	(Austria) Johannes Lamparter	200
2	(Germany) Julian Schmid	180
3	(Finland) Ilkka Herola	140
4	(Austria) Thomas Rettenegger	132
5	(Norway) Einar Lurås Oftebro	116

==== Nordic Combined Triple ====
Rank	final standings after 3 events	Behind
1	(Norway) Jens Lurås Oftebro	30:27.8
2	(Austria) Stefan Rettenegger	+3.7
3	(Germany) Vinzenz Geiger	+18.6
4	(Norway) Einar Lurås Oftebro	+42.3
5	(Austria) Johannes Lamparter	+43.2

== Women ==
Individual events in the World Cup history

Total	GUN–N	GUN–L	MSS	COM	Winners
62	37	3	10	12	10

after Gundersen in Oslo (15 March 2026)

=== Calendar ===
Event key: GUN – Gundersen / COM – Compact / MSS – Mass Start
All	No.	Date	Place (Hill)	Discipline	Winner	Second	Third	Overall Leader	R.
49	1	5 December 2025	(Norway) Trondheim (Granåsen HS102)	5 km GUN _{033}	(Norway) Ida Marie Hagen	(Germany) Nathalie Armbruster	(United States) Alexa Brabec	(Norway) Ida Marie Hagen	
50	2	6 December 2025	(Norway) Trondheim (Granåsen HS102)	5 km MSS _{007}	(Austria) Katharina Gruber	(Norway) Ida Marie Hagen	(Germany) Nathalie Armbruster	(Norway) Ida Marie Hagen	
51	3	19 December 2025	(Austria) Ramsau (W90-Mattensprunganlage HS98)	5 km MSS _{008}	(Norway) Ida Marie Hagen	(United States) Alexa Brabec	(Finland) Minja Korhonen	(Norway) Ida Marie Hagen	
52	4	20 December 2025	(Austria) Ramsau (W90-Mattensprunganlage HS98)	5 km GUN _{034}	(Norway) Ida Marie Hagen	(United States) Alexa Brabec	(Germany) Nathalie Armbruster	(Norway) Ida Marie Hagen	
—		3 January 2026	(Germany) Schonach (Langenwaldschanze HS100)	5 km GUN	cancelled due to bad weather conditions			—	
—		4 January 2026	(Germany) Schonach (Langenwaldschanze HS100)	5 km COM	cancelled due to bad weather conditions			—	
53	5	9 January 2026	(Estonia) Otepää (Tehvandi HS97)	5 km MSS _{009}	(Norway) Ida Marie Hagen	(Finland) Minja Korhonen	(Germany) Nathalie Armbruster	(Norway) Ida Marie Hagen	
54	6	10 January 2026	(Estonia) Otepää (Tehvandi HS97)	5 km GUN _{035}	(Norway) Ida Marie Hagen	(Japan) Yuna Kasai	(Finland) Minja Korhonen	(Norway) Ida Marie Hagen	
55	7	11 January 2026	(Estonia) Otepää (Tehvandi HS97)	5 km COM _{010}	(Norway) Ida Marie Hagen	(Finland) Minja Korhonen	(United States) Alexa Brabec	(Norway) Ida Marie Hagen	
56	8	17 January 2026	(Germany) Oberhof (Kanzlersgrund HS100)	5 km COM _{011}	(Norway) Ida Marie Hagen	(Germany) Nathalie Armbruster	(Finland) Minja Korhonen	(Norway) Ida Marie Hagen	
57	9	18 January 2026	(Germany) Oberhof (Kanzlersgrund HS100)	5 km GUN _{036}	(Norway) Ida Marie Hagen	(Finland) Minja Korhonen	(Germany) Nathalie Armbruster	(Norway) Ida Marie Hagen	
58	10	30 January 2026	(Austria) Seefeld (Toni-Seelos-Olympiaschanze HS109)	5 km MSS _{010}	(United States) Alexa Brabec	(Slovenia) Ema Volavšek	(Norway) Ida Marie Hagen	(Norway) Ida Marie Hagen	
59	11	31 January 2026	(Austria) Seefeld (Toni-Seelos-Olympiaschanze HS109)	5 km COM _{012}	(Norway) Ida Marie Hagen	(United States) Alexa Brabec	(Germany) Nathalie Armbruster	(Norway) Ida Marie Hagen	
60	12	1 February 2026	(Austria) Seefeld (Toni-Seelos-Olympiaschanze HS109)	7.5 km GUN _{037}	(Norway) Ida Marie Hagen	(United States) Alexa Brabec	(United States) Tara Geraghty-Moats	(Norway) Ida Marie Hagen	
2nd Nordic Combined Triple Overall (30 January – 1 February 2026)
61	13	6 March 2026	(Finland) Lahti (Salpausselkä HS130)	5 km GUN _{002}	(Finland) Minja Korhonen	(Norway) Ida Marie Hagen	(United States) Alexa Brabec	(Norway) Ida Marie Hagen	
62	14	15 March 2026	(Norway) Oslo (Holmenkollbakken HS134)	5 km GUN _{003}	(Norway) Ida Marie Hagen	(United States) Tara Geraghty-Moats	(Finland) Minja Korhonen	(Norway) Ida Marie Hagen	
5th Women's FIS World Cup Overall (5 December 2025 – 15 March 2025)					(Norway) Ida Marie Hagen	(United States) Alexa Brabec	(Finland) Minja Korhonen		

=== Standings ===
==== Overall ====
Rank	final standings after 14 events	Points
1	(Norway) Ida Marie Hagen	1370
2	(United States) Alexa Brabec	1115
3	(Finland) Minja Korhonen	997
4	(Germany) Nathalie Armbruster	900
5	(Japan) Yuna Kasai	764
6	(Austria) Katharina Gruber	700
7	(Norway) Marte Leinan Lund	650
8	(Slovenia) Ema Volavšek	640
9	(United States) Tara Geraghty-Moats	581
10	(Germany) Jenny Nowak	556

==== Nations Cup ====
Rank	final standings after 15 events	Points
1	Norway	3258
2	Germany	2339
3	United States	2272
4	Austria	2017
5	Finland	1613
6	Japan	1271
7	Slovenia	1270
8	Italy	674
9	France	641
10	Poland	271

==== Prize money ====
Rank	final standings after 17 payouts	euro (€)
1	(Norway) Ida Marie Hagen	87,364
2	(United States) Alexa Brabec	38,492
3	(Finland) Minja Korhonen	34,693
4	(Germany) Nathalie Armbruster	22,905
5	(Austria) Katharina Gruber	14,390
6	(Japan) Yuna Kasai	13,000
7	(Norway) Marte Leinan Lund	11,880
8	(Slovenia) Ema Volavšek	11,838
9	(United States) Tara Geraghty-Moats	11,600
10	(Austria) Lisa Hirner	10,450

==== Best Jumper Trophy ====
Rank	final standings after 14 events	Points
1	(Norway) Ingrid Låte	1160
2	(United States) Alexa Brabec	1091
3	(Norway) Ida Marie Hagen	957
4	(Finland) Minja Korhonen	919
5	(Austria) Katharina Gruber	806

==== Best Skier Trophy ====
Rank	final standings after 14 events	Points
1	(Norway) Ida Marie Hagen	1390
2	(Norway) Marte Leinan Lund	980
3	(United States) Tara Geraghty-Moats	936
4	(United States) Alexa Brabec	891
5	(Germany) Nathalie Armbruster	873

==== Compact Trophy ====
Rank	final standings after 3 events (Note: The winner of the Compact Trophy, receives a small World Cup Trophy, provided that at least 3 Compact events have been held during the season.)	Points
1	(Norway) Ida Marie Hagen	300
2	(United States) Alexa Brabec	240
3	(Finland) Minja Korhonen	219
4	(Norway) Marte Leinan Lund	176
5	(Germany) Nathalie Armbruster	170

==== Mass Start Trophy ====
Rank	final standings after 4 events	Points
1	(Norway) Ida Marie Hagen	370
2	(United States) Alexa Brabec	330
3	(Germany) Nathalie Armbruster	268
4	(Finland) Minja Korhonen	266
5	(Austria) Katharina Gruber	256

==== Nordic Combined Triple ====
Rank	final standings after 3 events	Behind
1	(Norway) Ida Marie Hagen	21:03.2
2	(United States) Alexa Brabec	+55.0
3	(United States) Tara Geraghty-Moats	+1:47.4
4	(Slovenia) Ema Volavšek	+2:12.9
5	(Germany) Nathalie Armbruster	+2:20.8

== Mixed team ==
World Cup history in real time

Total	Relay	Sprint	Winners
4	3	1	1

after Sprint relay event in Lahti (7 March 2026)

All	#	Date	Place (Hill)	Discipline	Winner	Second	Third	R.
4	1	7 March 2026	(Finland) Lahti (Salpausselkä HS130)	2 x 6 km Sprint _{001}	Norway: 1. Jens Lurås Oftebro; 2. Ida Marie Hagen	Finland: 1. Ilkka Herola; 2. Minja Korhonen	Germany: 1. Johannes Rydzek; 2. Nathalie Armbruster	

== Provisional competition rounds ==
=== Men ===
No.	Place	Provisional round (PCR)	Winner	R.
1	(Finland) Ruka	28 November 2025	(Austria) Johannes Lamparter	
2	(Norway) Trondheim	5 December 2025	(Austria) Thomas Rettenegger	
3	(Austria) Ramsau	18 December 2025	(Austria) Thomas Rettenegger	
—	(Germany) Schonach	2 January 2026	cancelled	
4	(Estonia) Otepää	8 January 2026	(Germany) Julian Schmid (Austria) Thomas Rettenegger	
5	(Germany) Oberhof	16 January 2026	(Austria) Thomas Rettenegger	
6	(Austria) Seefeld	29 January 2026	(Austria) Thomas Rettenegger	
7	(Austria) Bad Mitterndorf	26 February 2026	(Austria) Johannes Lamparter	
8	(Finland) Lahti	5 March 2026	(Austria) Thomas Rettenegger	
9	(Norway) Oslo	14 March 2026	(Austria) Johannes Lamparter	

=== Women ===
No.	Place	Provisional round (PCR)	Winner	R.
1	(Norway) Trondheim	4 December 2025	(Norway) Ingrid Låte	
2	(Austria) Ramsau	18 December 2025	(United States) Alexa Brabec	
—	(Germany) Schonach	2 January 2026	cancelled	
3	(Estonia) Otepää	8 January 2026	(Norway) Ingrid Låte (Norway) Ingrid Låte	
4	(Germany) Oberhof	16 January 2026	(Norway) Ingrid Låte	
5	(Austria) Seefeld	29 January 2026	(Norway) Ingrid Låte	
6	(Finland) Lahti	5 March 2026	(Finland) Minja Korhonen	
7	(Norway) Oslo	14 March 2026	(United States) Alexa Brabec	

== Podium table by nation ==
Table showing the World Cup podium places (gold–1st place, silver–2nd place, bronze–3rd place) by the countries represented by the athletes.

after men's Gundersen in Oslo (15 March 2026)

Rank	Nation	Gold	Silver	Bronze	Total
1	Norway	18	6	6	30
2	Austria	8	8	4	20
3	Germany	3	7	12	22
4	Finland	2	4	6	12
5	United States	1	5	4	10
6	Japan	0	1	0	1
6	Slovenia	0	1	0	1
Totals (7 entries)		32	32	32	96

== Points distribution ==
The table shows the number of points won in the 2025–26 FIS Nordic Combined World Cup for men and women.

Place	1	2	3	4	5	6	7	8	9	10	11	12	13	14	15	16	17	18	19	20	21	22	23	24	25	26	27	28	29	30	31	32	33	34	35	36	37	38	39	40
Individual	100	90	80	70	60	55	52	49	46	43	40	38	36	34	32	30	28	26	24	22	20	19	18	17	16	15	14	13	12	11	10	9	8	7	6	5	4	3	2	1
Triple – Days 1 & 2	50	45	40	35	30	28	26	24	23	22	20	19	18	17	16	15	14	13	12	11	10	9			8	7			6	5			4	3			2	1
Triple – Day 3	200	180	160	140	120	112	104	96	92	88	80	76	72	68	64	60	56	52	48	44	40	36			32	28			24	20			16	12			8	4

== Achievements ==
First World Cup career victory

Men

- (Austria) Thomas Rettenegger (25), in his 6th season – Mass Start in Trondheim
- (Norway) Einar Lurås Oftebro (27), in his 8th season – Gundersen in Otepää

Women

- (Austria) Katharina Gruber (17), in her 2nd season – Mass Start in Trondheim
- (United States) Alexa Brabec (21), in her 6th season – Mass Start in Seefeld
- (Finland) Minja Korhonen (18), in her 4th season – Gundersen in Lahti

First World Cup podium

Men

- (Germany) Wendelin Thannheimer (26), in his 7th season – 2nd in Trondheim Mass Start
- (Norway) Einar Lurås Oftebro (27), in his 8th season – 3rd in Otepää Mass Start
- (Norway) Andreas Skoglund (24), in his 8th season – 3rd in Otepää Gundersen

Women

- (Austria) Katharina Gruber (17), in her 2nd season – 1st in Trondheim Mass Start
- (United States) Alexa Brabec (21), in her 6th season – 3rd in Trondheim Gundersen

Number of wins this season (in brackets are all-time wins)

Men

- (Austria) Johannes Lamparter – 6 (23)
- (Norway) Jens Lurås Oftebro – 4 (11)
- (Germany) Vinzenz Geiger – 2 (19)
- (Austria) Thomas Rettenegger – 2 (2)
- (Germany) Julian Schmid – 1 (4)
- (Finland) Ilkka Herola – 1 (2)
- (Norway) Einar Lurås Oftebro – 1 (1)

Women

- (Norway) Ida Marie Hagen – 11 (28) (Note: Women's all-time record in World Cup history)
- (Austria) Katharina Gruber – 1 (1)
- (United States) Alexa Brabec – 1 (1)
- (Finland) Minja Korhonen – 1 (1)

== Retirements ==
The following notable Nordic combined skiers, who competed in the World Cup, are expected to retire during or after the 2025–26 season:

Men

- (Norway) Espen Andersen
- (Italy) Raffaele Buzzi
- (Italy) Samuel Costa
- (Austria) Lukas Greiderer
- (Italy) Alessandro Pittin
- (Germany) Johannes Rydzek
- (Austria) Mario Seidl
- (France) Laurent Muhlethaler
- (Norway) Simen Tiller
- (Japan) Akito Watabe

Women

- (Italy) Veronica Gianmoena
