= 2024–25 FIS Nordic Combined World Cup =

2024–25 season for world cup Nordic combined

Discipline	Men	Women
Overall	(Germany) Vinzenz Geiger (1)	(Germany) Nathalie Armbruster (1)
Nations Cup	Germany (15)	Germany (1)
Best Jumper Trophy	(Norway) Jarl Magnus Riiber (5)	(Germany) Maria Gerboth (1)
Best Skier Trophy	(Norway) Jens Lurås Oftebro (2)	(Norway) Ida Marie Hagen (3)
Compact Trophy	(Germany) Vinzenz Geiger (1)	(Germany) Nathalie Armbruster (1)
Mass Start Trophy	(Norway) Jarl Magnus Riiber (1)	(Japan) Haruka Kasai (1)

Stage events
Ruka Tour	(Germany) Vinzenz Geiger (1)	—
Triple	(Germany) Vinzenz Geiger (1)	(Germany) Nathalie Armbruster (1)

Competition
Edition	42nd	5th
Locations	8	6
Individual	19	14

Overall Champions

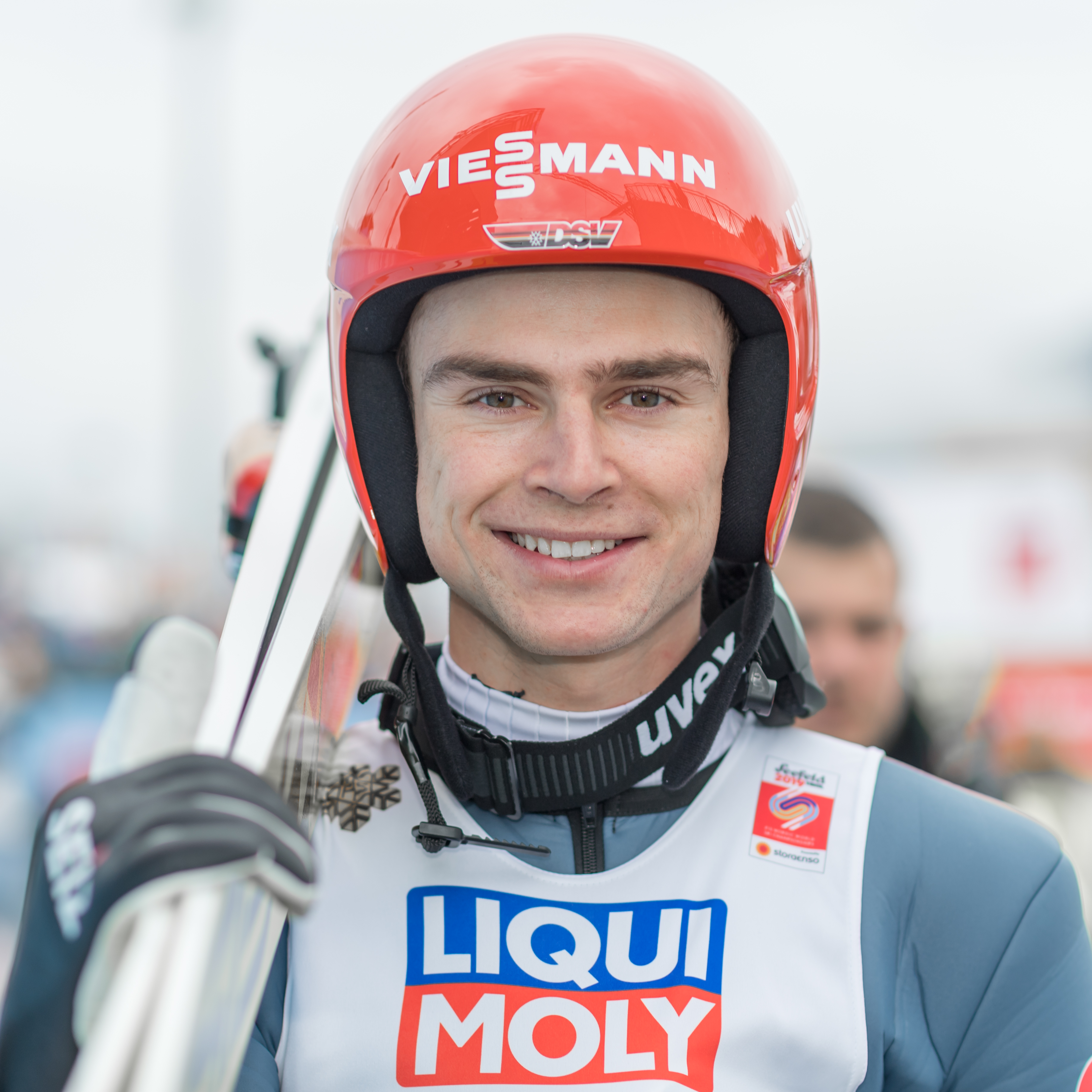
Vinzenz Geiger won the World Cup for the first time in his career, securing seven victories throughout the season, as well as claiming the Compact Trophy, Ruka Tour, and Nordic Combined Triple.

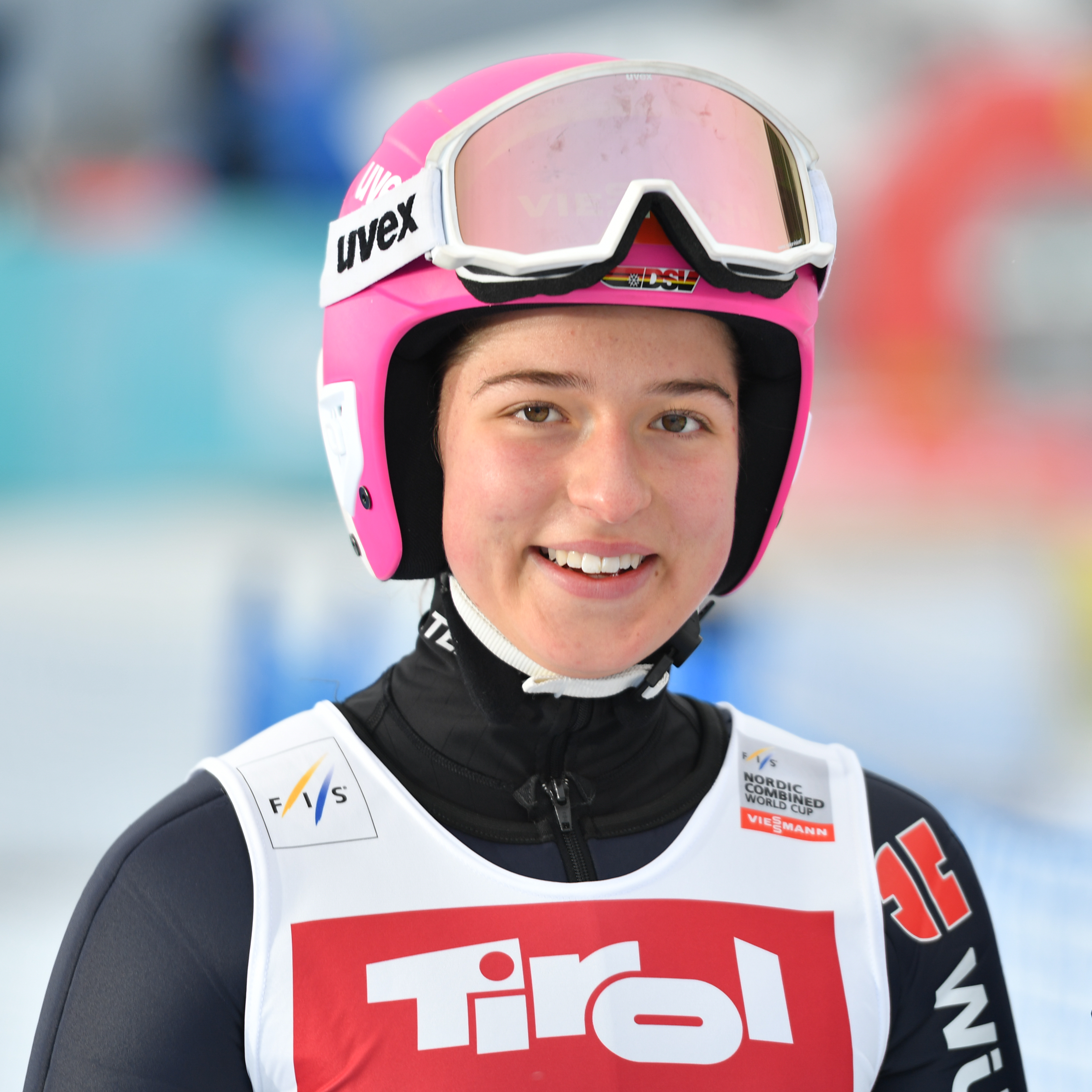
Nathalie Armbruster won the World Cup for the first time in her career, also securing her first-ever victory at this level. In addition, she claimed the Compact Trophy and made history as the first woman ever to win the Nordic Combined Triple.

The 2024–25 FIS Nordic Combined World Cup, organized by the International Ski Federation (FIS), was the 42nd World Cup season for men and the 5th season for women as the highest level of international Nordic combined competitions.

The men's season started on 29 November 2024 in Ruka, Finland and concluded on 22 March 2025 in Lahti, Finland. The women's season started on 6 December 2024 in Lillehammer, Norway and concluded on 16 March 2025 in Oslo, Norway.

The season took a break in February and March due to the FIS Nordic World Ski Championships 2025 in Trondheim, Norway.

Jarl Magnus Riiber (men's) and Ida Marie Hagen (women's), both from Norway, were the reigning champions from the previous season. However, they failed to defend their titles, both finishing second overall in the World Cup standings. Riiber also ended his career during the competition in Oslo.

The new World Cup winners for the season were Germany’s Vinzenz Geiger and Nathalie Armbruster.

== Season overview ==
In April 2024, during the subcommittee meeting for calendar planning in Prague, the proposed schedule for the 2024–25 World Cup season was published. The competition programs were officially approved at a meeting in Portorož on 8 May.

Starting this season, a separate Mass Start Trophy was introduced, with the winner receiving a mini crystal globe at the end of the season. Additionally, the format of the Nordic Combined Triple was changed to include a Mass Start, a Compact event and a Gundersen competition (12.5 km for men, 7.5 km for women) for both genders.

Two competitions were scheduled in Oslo, marking the large hill World Cup debut for women. Both events were won by Gyda Westvold Hansen.

On 7 June 2024, it was announced that the World Cup competitions set for 10–11 January 2025 at the modernized Trampolino Dal Ben (HS143) in Predazzo would not take place. The organizers decided to cancel the pre-Olympic trials six months in advance due to delays in facility reconstruction.

The competitions planned for late January in Hakuba were also cancelled for financial reasons. A potential replacement in Klingenthal failed to materialize for the same reason.

== Map of world cup hosts ==
Europe

Location of all 8 World Cup hosts of the season

== Men ==
Individual events in the World Cup history

Total	GUN–L	GUN–N	MSS	COM	GU	Sp	Pen	Hsp	Csp	Winners
632	153	108	30	9	239	86	4	2	1	77

after final Gundersen event in Lahti (22 March 2025)

=== Calendar ===
Event key: GUN – Gundersen / COM – Compact / MSS – Mass Start
All	No.	Date	Place (Hill)	Discipline	Winner	Second	Third	R.
614	1	(Note: Ski Jumping competition round cancelled due to wind condition – PCR used as official jumping result.)29 November 2024	(Finland) Ruka (Rukatunturi HS142)	7,5 km COM _{004}	(Norway) Jarl Magnus Riiber	(Germany) Vinzenz Geiger	(Germany) Julian Schmid	
615	2	30 November 2024	(Finland) Ruka (Rukatunturi HS142)	10 km GUN _{150}	(Germany) Johannes Rydzek	(Germany) Julian Schmid	(Germany) Vinzenz Geiger	
616	3	1 December 2024	(Finland) Ruka (Rukatunturi HS142)	10 km MSS _{027}	(Germany) Vinzenz Geiger	(Norway) Jarl Magnus Riiber	(Germany) Manuel Faißt	
7th Ruka Tour Overall (29 November – 1 December 2024)					(Germany) Vinzenz Geiger	(Norway) Jarl Magnus Riiber	(Germany) Julian Schmid	
617	4	7 December 2024	(Norway) Lillehammer (Lysgårdsbakken HS98/HS138)	10 km GUN _{104}	(Norway) Jarl Magnus Riiber	(Germany) Julian Schmid	(Austria) Johannes Lamparter	
618	5	8 December 2024	(Norway) Lillehammer (Lysgårdsbakken HS98/HS138)	7.5 km COM _{005}	(Germany) Vinzenz Geiger	(Germany) Julian Schmid	(Norway) Jarl Magnus Riiber	
619	6	20 December 2024	(Austria) Ramsau (W90-Mattensprunganlage HS98)	10 km MSS _{028}	(Norway) Jarl Magnus Riiber	(Norway) Jens Lurås Oftebro	(Estonia) Kristjan Ilves	
620	7	21 December 2024	(Austria) Ramsau (W90-Mattensprunganlage HS98)	10 km GUN _{105}	(Germany) Vinzenz Geiger	(Finland) Ilkka Herola	(Germany) Julian Schmid	
621	8	18 January 2025	(Germany) Schonach (Langenwaldschanze HS100)	10 km GUN _{106}	(Norway) Jens Lurås Oftebro	(Austria) Johannes Lamparter	(Finland) Ilkka Herola	
622	9	19 January 2025	(Germany) Schonach (Langenwaldschanze HS100)	8 km COM _{006}	(Austria) Johannes Lamparter	(Norway) Jarl Magnus Riiber	(Germany) Vinzenz Geiger	
623	10	31 January 2025	(Austria) Seefeld (Toni-Seelos-Olympiaschanze HS109)	10 km MSS _{029}	(Norway) Jarl Magnus Riiber	(Austria) Johannes Lamparter	(Norway) Jens Lurås Oftebro	
624	11	1 February 2025	(Austria) Seefeld (Toni-Seelos-Olympiaschanze HS109)	7.5 km COM _{007}	(Norway) Jens Lurås Oftebro	(Norway) Jarl Magnus Riiber	(Germany) Vinzenz Geiger	
625	12	2 February 2025	(Austria) Seefeld (Toni-Seelos-Olympiaschanze HS109)	12.5 km GUN _{107}	(Germany) Vinzenz Geiger	(Norway) Jarl Magnus Riiber	(Norway) Jens Lurås Oftebro	
12th Nordic Combined Triple Overall (31 January – 2 February 2025)
626	13	7 February 2025	(Estonia) Otepää (Tehvandi HS97)	10 km MSS _{030}	(Norway) Jarl Magnus Riiber	(Austria) Johannes Lamparter	(Germany) Vinzenz Geiger	
627	14	8 February 2025	(Estonia) Otepää (Tehvandi HS97)	10 km GUN _{108}	(Germany) Vinzenz Geiger	(Norway) Jarl Magnus Riiber	(Norway) Jens Lurås Oftebro	
628	15	9 February 2025	(Estonia) Otepää (Tehvandi HS97)	7.5 km COM _{008}	(Germany) Vinzenz Geiger	(Norway) Jarl Magnus Riiber	(Germany) Julian Schmid	
FIS Nordic World Ski Championships 2025 (28 February – 8 March • Trondheim, Norway)
629	16	15 March 2025	(Norway) Oslo (Holmenkollbakken HS134)	10 km GUN _{151}	(Germany) Vinzenz Geiger	(Norway) Jarl Magnus Riiber	(Austria) Johannes Lamparter	
630	17	16 March 2025	(Norway) Oslo (Holmenkollbakken HS134)	7.5 km COM _{009}	(Finland) Ilkka Herola	(Germany) Vinzenz Geiger	(Austria) Johannes Lamparter	
631	18	21 March 2025	(Finland) Lahti (Salpausselkä HS130)	10 km GUN _{152}	(Austria) Johannes Lamparter	(Finland) Ilkka Herola	(Germany) Julian Schmid	
632	19	22 March 2025	(Finland) Lahti (Salpausselkä HS130)	10 km GUN _{153}	(Austria) Johannes Lamparter	(Germany) Julian Schmid	(France) Laurent Muhlethaler	
42nd FIS World Cup Overall (29 November 2024 – 22 March 2025)					(Germany) Vinzenz Geiger	(Norway) Jarl Magnus Riiber	(Austria) Johannes Lamparter	

=== Overall leaders ===
Holder (Note: The leading position in the World Cup belongs to the competitor who has accumulated the most points in the general classification of the series in the competitions held so far. In the event of an equal number of points, the World Cup leaderis the competitor who has won more competitions.)	Date	Place(s)	Number of competitions
Individual
(Norway) Jarl Magnus Riiber (1)	29 November 2024 – 30 November 2024	(Finland) Ruka	2
(Germany) Vinzenz Geiger	1 December 2024	(Finland) Ruka	1
(Norway) Jarl Magnus Riiber (2)	7 December 2024 – 15 March 2025	(Norway) Lillehammer – (Norway) Oslo	13
(Germany) Vinzenz Geiger (2)	16 March 2025 – 22 March 2025	(Norway) Oslo – (Finland) Lahti	3
Nations Cup
Germany (1)	29 November 2024 – 8 December 2024	(Finland) Ruka – (Norway) Lillehammer	5
Norway	20 December 2024	(Austria) Ramsau	1
Germany (2)	21 December 2024 – 22 March 2025	(Austria) Ramsau – (Finland) Lahti	13

=== Standings ===
==== Overall ====
Rank	final standings after 19 events	Points
1	(Germany) Vinzenz Geiger	1506
2	(Norway) Jarl Magnus Riiber	1385
3	(Austria) Johannes Lamparter	1317
4	(Germany) Julian Schmid	1285
5	(Finland) Ilkka Herola	1114
6	(Norway) Jens Lurås Oftebro	1073
7	(Austria) Stefan Rettenegger	854
8	(Austria) Franz-Josef Rehrl	826
9	(Germany) Johannes Rydzek	801
10	(Estonia) Kristjan Ilves	743

==== Nations Cup ====
Rank	final standings after 19 events	Points
1	Germany	6179
2	Austria	5340
3	Norway	4976
4	Finland	1551
5	France	1019
6	Japan	980
7	Estonia	743
8	United States	600
9	Italy	392
10	Czech Republic	172

==== Prize money ====
Rank	final standings after 23 payouts	CHF
1	(Germany) Vinzenz Geiger	123 390
2	(Norway) Jarl Magnus Riiber	117 500
3	(Austria) Johannes Lamparter	77 110
4	(Germany) Julian Schmid	64 170
5	(Norway) Jens Lurås Oftebro	57 130
6	(Finland) Ilkka Herola	49 515
7	(Germany) Johannes Rydzek	22 590
8	(Austria) Stefan Rettenegger	21 220
9	(Austria) Franz-Josef Rehrl	21 180
10	(Estonia) Kristjan Ilves	18 310

==== Best Jumper Trophy ====
Rank	final standings after 19 events	Points
1	(Norway) Jarl Magnus Riiber	1489
2	(Austria) Franz-Josef Rehrl	1223
3	(Austria) Johannes Lamparter	1197
4	(Austria) Thomas Rettenegger	1098
5	(Germany) Julian Schmid	968
6	(Germany) Vinzenz Geiger	952
7	(Japan) Ryōta Yamamoto	870
8	(Austria) Martin Fritz	850
9	(Germany) Wendelin Thannheimer	806
10	(Finland) Ilkka Herola	743

==== Best Skier Trophy ====
Rank	final standings after 19 events	Points
1	(Norway) Jens Lurås Oftebro	1451
2	(Germany) Vinzenz Geiger	1201
3	(Austria) Stefan Rettenegger	923
4	(Norway) Jørgen Graabak	988
5	(Germany) Julian Schmid	978
6	(Finland) Ilkka Herola	977
7	(Norway) Andreas Skoglund	866
8	(Estonia) Kristjan Ilves	860
9	(Austria) Johannes Lamparter	830
10	(Austria) Fabio Obermeyr	782

==== Compact Trophy ====
Rank	final standings after 6 events	Points
1	(Germany) Vinzenz Geiger	540
2	(Norway) Jarl Magnus Riiber	450
3	(Austria) Johannes Lamparter	440
4	(Germany) Julian Schmid	400
5	(Finland) Ilkka Herola	327
6	(Norway) Jens Lurås Oftebro	296
7	(Austria) Stefan Rettenegger	264
8	(Austria) Franz-Josef Rehrl	230
9	(Germany) Johannes Rydzek	222
10	(Estonia) Kristjan Ilves	218

==== Mass Start Trophy ====
Rank	final standings after 4 events	Points
1	(Norway) Jarl Magnus Riiber	390
2	(Austria) Johannes Lamparter	281
3	(Germany) Vinzenz Geiger	278
4	(Germany) Julian Schmid	235
5	(Norway) Jens Lurås Oftebro	234
6	(Finland) Ilkka Herola	230
7	(Austria) Franz-Josef Rehrl	196
8	(Germany) Manuel Faißt	193
9	(Estonia) Kristjan Ilves	179
10	(Austria) Stefan Rettenegger	165

==== Ruka Tour ====
Rank	final standings after 3 events	Points
1	(Germany) Vinzenz Geiger	270
2	(Norway) Jarl Magnus Riiber	260
3	(Germany) Julian Schmid	230
4	(Germany) Johannes Rydzek	198
5	(Norway) Jørgen Graabak	142
6	(Austria) Franz-Josef Rehrl	138
7	(Germany) Manuel Faißt	132
8	(Austria) Thomas Rettenegger	126
9	(Norway) Andreas Skoglund	123
10	(Finland) Ilkka Herola	116

==== Nordic Combined Triple ====
Rank	final standings after 3 events	Behind
1	(Germany) Vinzenz Geiger
2	(Norway) Jarl Magnus Riiber	+0.2
3	(Norway) Jens Lurås Oftebro	+0.4
4	(Finland) Ilkka Herola	+1.6
5	(Austria) Johannes Lamparter	+10.6
6	(Germany) Julian Schmid	+32.7
7	(Austria) Stefan Rettenegger	+39.1
8	(Austria) Thomas Rettenegger	+46.9
9	(Austria) Franz-Josef Rehrl	+58.4
10	(Germany) Manuel Faißt	+1:13.9

== Women ==
Individual events in the World Cup history

Total	GUN–N	GUN–L	MSS	COM	Winners
48	32	1	6	9	7

after final Compact event in Oslo (16 March 2025)

=== Calendar ===
Event key: GUN – Gundersen / COM – Compact / MSS – Mass Start
All	No.	Date	Place (Hill)	Discipline	Winner	Second	Third	R.
35	1	6 December 2024	(Norway) Lillehammer (Lysgårdsbakken HS98)	5 km GUN _{029}	(Norway) Ida Marie Hagen	(Norway) Gyda Westvold Hansen	(Austria) Lisa Hirner	
36	2	7 December 2024	(Norway) Lillehammer (Lysgårdsbakken HS98)	5 km COM _{004}	(Norway) Ida Marie Hagen	(Germany) Nathalie Armbruster	(Norway) Gyda Westvold Hansen	
37	3	20 December 2024	(Austria) Ramsau (W90-Mattensprunganlage HS98)	5 km MSS _{004}	(Norway) Ida Marie Hagen	(Japan) Haruka Kasai	(Finland) Minja Korhonen	
38	4	21 December 2024	(Austria) Ramsau (W90-Mattensprunganlage HS98)	5 km COM _{005}	(Norway) Ida Marie Hagen	(Germany) Nathalie Armbruster	(Norway) Gyda Westvold Hansen	
39	5	18 January 2025	(Germany) Schonach (Langenwaldschanze HS100)	4 km GUN _{030}	(Norway) Ida Marie Hagen	(Germany) Nathalie Armbruster	(Japan) Haruka Kasai	
40	6	19 January 2025	(Germany) Schonach (Langenwaldschanze HS100)	6 km COM _{006}	(Norway) Ida Marie Hagen	(Norway) Gyda Westvold Hansen	(Norway) Marte Leinan Lund	
41	7	31 January 2025	(Austria) Seefeld (Toni-Seelos-Olympiaschanze HS109)	5 km MSS _{005}	(Norway) Ida Marie Hagen	(Norway) Gyda Westvold Hansen	(Germany) Nathalie Armbruster	
42	8	1 February 2025	(Austria) Seefeld (Toni-Seelos-Olympiaschanze HS109)	5 km COM _{007}	(Germany) Nathalie Armbruster	(Norway) Gyda Westvold Hansen	(Japan) Haruka Kasai	
43	9	2 February 2025	(Austria) Seefeld (Toni-Seelos-Olympiaschanze HS109)	7.5 km GUN _{031}	(Germany) Nathalie Armbruster	(Norway) Gyda Westvold Hansen	(Japan) Haruka Kasai	
1st Nordic Combined Triple Overall (31 January – 2 February 2025)
44	10	7 February 2025	(Estonia) Otepää (Tehvandi HS97)	5 km MSS _{006}	(Japan) Yuna Kasai	(Japan) Haruka Kasai	(Germany) Jenny Nowak	
45	11	8 February 2025	(Estonia) Otepää (Tehvandi HS97)	5 km GUN _{032}	(Norway) Ida Marie Hagen	(Japan) Haruka Kasai	(Germany) Nathalie Armbruster	
46	12	9 February 2025	(Estonia) Otepää (Tehvandi HS97)	5 km COM _{008}	(Germany) Nathalie Armbruster	(Norway) Ida Marie Hagen	(Japan) Haruka Kasai	
FIS Nordic World Ski Championships 2025 (27 February – 2 March • Trondheim, Norway)
47	13	15 March 2025	(Norway) Oslo (Holmenkollbakken HS134)	5 km GUN _{001}	(Norway) Gyda Westvold Hansen	(Austria) Lisa Hirner	(Norway) Ida Marie Hagen	
48	14	16 March 2025	(Norway) Oslo (Holmenkollbakken HS134)	5 km COM _{009}	(Norway) Gyda Westvold Hansen	(Norway) Ida Marie Hagen	(Japan) Haruka Kasai	
5th Women's FIS World Cup Overall (6 December 2024 – 16 March 2025)					(Germany) Nathalie Armbruster	(Norway) Ida Marie Hagen	(Japan) Haruka Kasai	

=== Overall leaders ===
Holder	Date	Place(s)	Number of competitions
Individual
(Norway) Ida Marie Hagen	6 December 2024 – 1 February 2025	(Norway) Lillehammer – (Austria) Seefeld	8
(Germany) Nathalie Armbruster	2 February 2025 – 16 March 2025	(Austria) Seefeld – (Norway) Oslo	6
Nations Cup
Germany (1)	6 December 2024	(Norway) Lillehammer	1
Norway	7 December 2024	(Norway) Lillehammer	1
Germany (2)	20 December 2024 – 18 January 2025	(Austria) Ramsau – (Germany) Schonach	3
Norway (2)	19 January 2025 – 31 January 2025	(Germany) Schonach – (Austria) Seefeld	2
Germany (3)	1 February 2025 – 16 March 2025	(Austria) Seefeld – (Norway) Oslo	7

=== Standings ===
==== Overall ====
Rank	final standings after 14 events	Points
1	(Germany) Nathalie Armbruster	1130
2	(Norway) Ida Marie Hagen	1042
3	(Japan) Haruka Kasai	1029
4	(Japan) Yuna Kasai	854
5	(Norway) Gyda Westvold Hansen	842
6	(France) Lena Brocard	656
7	(Finland) Minja Korhonen	652
8	(Germany) Jenny Nowak	609
9	(United States) Alexa Brabec	559
10	(Germany) Maria Gerboth	552

==== Nations Cup ====
Rank	final standings after 14 events	Points
1	Germany	3279
2	Norway	3019
3	Japan	2458
4	Austria	1533
5	Finland	1031
6	United States	956
7	France	739
8	Slovenia	703
9	Italy	464
10	Poland	325

==== Prize money ====
Rank	final standings after 17 payouts	CHF
1	(Norway) Ida Marie Hagen	50 400
2	(Germany) Nathalie Armbruster	43 500
3	(Japan) Haruka Kasai	29 450
4	(Norway) Gyda Westvold Hansen	27 800
5	(Japan) Yuna Kasai	17 250
6	(Germany) Maria Gerboth	11 500
7	(Norway) Marte Leinan Lund	11 500
8	(Finland) Minja Korhonen	8 550
9	(Austria) Lisa Hirner	7 500
10	(United States) Alexa Brabec	7 000

==== Best Jumper Trophy ====
Rank	final standings after 14 events	Points
1	(Germany) Maria Gerboth	985
2	(Japan) Haruka Kasai	902
3	(Japan) Yuna Kasai	901
4	(Germany) Nathalie Armbruster	796
5	(Austria) Annalena Slamik	747
6	(Norway) Ida Marie Hagen	702
7	(Austria) Claudia Purker	691
8	(Germany) Jenny Nowak	682
9	(France) Lena Brocard	589
10	(Norway) Ingrid Låte	580

==== Best Skier Trophy ====
Rank	final standings after 14 events	Points
1	(Norway) Ida Marie Hagen	1190
2	(Germany) Nathalie Armbruster	1130
3	(Norway) Marte Leinan Lund	840
4	(Japan) Haruka Kasai	825
5	(Norway) Gyda Westvold Hansen	808
6	(Finland) Minja Korhonen	705
7	(Slovenia) Ema Volavšek	683
8	(France) Lena Brocard	667
9	(United States) Alexa Brabec	660
10	(Japan) Yuna Kasai	611

==== Compact Trophy ====
Rank	final standings after 6 events	Points
1	(Germany) Nathalie Armbruster	520
2	(Norway) Ida Marie Hagen	480
3	(Norway) Gyda Westvold Hansen	440
4	(Japan) Haruka Kasai	415
5	(Japan) Yuna Kasai	330
6	(Norway) Marte Leinan Lund	285
7	(France) Lena Brocard	275
8	(United States) Alexa Brabec	242
9	(Slovenia) Ema Volavšek	240
10	(Finland) Minja Korhonen	230

==== Mass Start Trophy ====
Rank	final standings after 3 events (Note: The winner of the Mass Start Trophy, receives a small World Cup Trophy, provided that at least 3 Mass Start events have been held during the season.)	Points
1	(Japan) Haruka Kasai	235
2	(Norway) Ida Marie Hagen	232
3	(Japan) Yuna Kasai	230
4	(Germany) Nathalie Armbruster	220
5	(Germany) Jenny Nowak	171
6	(France) Lena Brocard	164
7	(Finland) Minja Korhonen	142
8	(Germany) Maria Gerboth	133
9	(Germany) Cindy Haasch	129
10	(Slovenia) Ema Volavšek	128

==== Nordic Combined Triple ====
Rank	final standings after 3 events	Behind
1	(Germany) Nathalie Armbruster
2	(Norway) Gyda Westvold Hansen	+1:24.3
3	(Japan) Haruka Kasai	+1:40.7
4	(United States) Alexa Brabec	+1:49.3
5	(Japan) Yuna Kasai	+1:54.7
6	(France) Lena Brocard	+2:11.9
7	(Germany) Jenny Nowak	+3:31.1
8	(Finland) Minja Korhonen	+3:36.9
9	(Japan) Yuzuki Kainuma	+3:41.7
10	(Germany) Cindy Haasch	+3:47.5

== Provisional competition rounds ==
=== Men ===
No.	Place	Provisional round (PCR)	Winner	R.
1	(Finland) Ruka	28 November 2024	(Norway) Jarl Magnus Riiber	
2	(Norway) Lillehammer	6 December 2024	(Norway) Jarl Magnus Riiber	
3	(Austria) Ramsau	19 December 2024	(Austria) Thomas Rettenegger	
4	(Germany) Schonach	17 January 2025	(Austria) Thomas Rettenegger	
5	(Austria) Seefeld	30 January 2025	(Austria) Thomas Rettenegger	
6	(Estonia) Otepää	6 February 2025	(Norway) Jarl Magnus Riiber	
7	(Norway) Oslo	14 March 2025	(Germany) Terence Weber	
8	(Finland) Lahti	20 March 2025	(Germany) Julian Schmid	

=== Women ===
No.	Place	Provisional round (PCR)	Winner	R.
1	(Norway) Lillehammer	5 December 2024	(Japan) Haruka Kasai	
2	(Austria) Ramsau	19 December 2024	(Japan) Haruka Kasai	
3	(Germany) Schonach	17 January 2025	(Japan) Haruka Kasai	
4	(Austria) Seefeld	30 January 2025	(Germany) Maria Gerboth	
5	(Estonia) Otepää	6 February 2025	(Austria) Annalena Slamik	
6	(Norway) Oslo	14 March 2025	(Norway) Gyda Westvold Hansen	

== Podium table by nation ==
Table showing the World Cup podium places (gold–1st place, silver–2nd place, bronze–3rd place) by the countries represented by the athletes.

Rank	Nation	Gold	Silver	Bronze	Total
1	Norway	17	15	8	40
2	Germany	11	9	12	32
3	Austria	3	4	4	11
4	Japan	1	3	5	9
5	Finland	1	2	2	5
6	Estonia	0	0	1	1
6	France	0	0	1	1
Totals (7 entries)		33	33	33	99

== Points distribution ==
The table shows the number of points won in the 2024–25 FIS Nordic Combined World Cup for men and women.

Place	1	2	3	4	5	6	7	8	9	10	11	12	13	14	15	16	17	18	19	20	21	22	23	24	25	26	27	28	29	30	31	32	33	34	35	36	37	38	39	40
Individual	100	90	80	70	60	55	52	49	46	43	40	38	36	34	32	30	28	26	24	22	20	19	18	17	16	15	14	13	12	11	10	9	8	7	6	5	4	3	2	1
Triple – Days 1 & 2	50	45	40	35	30	28	26	24	23	22	20	19	18	17	16	15	14	13	12	11	10	9			8	7			6	5			4	3			2	1
Triple – Day 3	200	180	160	140	120	112	104	96	92	88	80	76	72	68	64	60	56	52	48	44	40	36			32	28			24	20			16	12			8	4

== Achievements ==
First World Cup career victory

Men

- (Finland) Ilkka Herola (29), in his 14th season – Compact in Oslo

Women

- (Germany) Nathalie Armbruster (19), in her 4th season – Compact in Seefeld
- (Japan) Yuna Kasai (21), in her 5th season – Mass Start in Otepää

First World Cup podium

Men

Women

Number of wins this season (in brackets are all-time wins)

Men

- (Germany) Vinzenz Geiger – 7 (17)
- (Norway) Jarl Magnus Riiber – 5 (78) (Note: Men's all-time record in World Cup history)
- (Austria) Johannes Lamparter – 3 (17)
- (Norway) Jens Lurås Oftebro – 2 (7)
- (Germany) Johannes Rydzek – 1 (18)
- (Finland) Ilkka Herola – 1 (1)

Women

- (Norway) Ida Marie Hagen – 8 (17)
- (Germany) Nathalie Armbruster – 3 (3)
- (Norway) Gyda Westvold Hansen – 2 (23) (Note: Women's all-time record in World Cup history)
- (Japan) Yuna Kasai – 1 (1)

== Retirements ==
The following notable Nordic combined skiers, who competed in the World Cup, are expected to retire during or after the 2024–25 season:

Men

- (Norway) Jarl Magnus Riiber
- (Norway) Espen Bjørnstad
- (Norway) Jørgen Graabak

Women

- (Norway) Gyda Westvold Hansen
- (Germany) Svenja Würth
