= Lisa Hirner =

Austrian Nordic combined skier (born 2003)

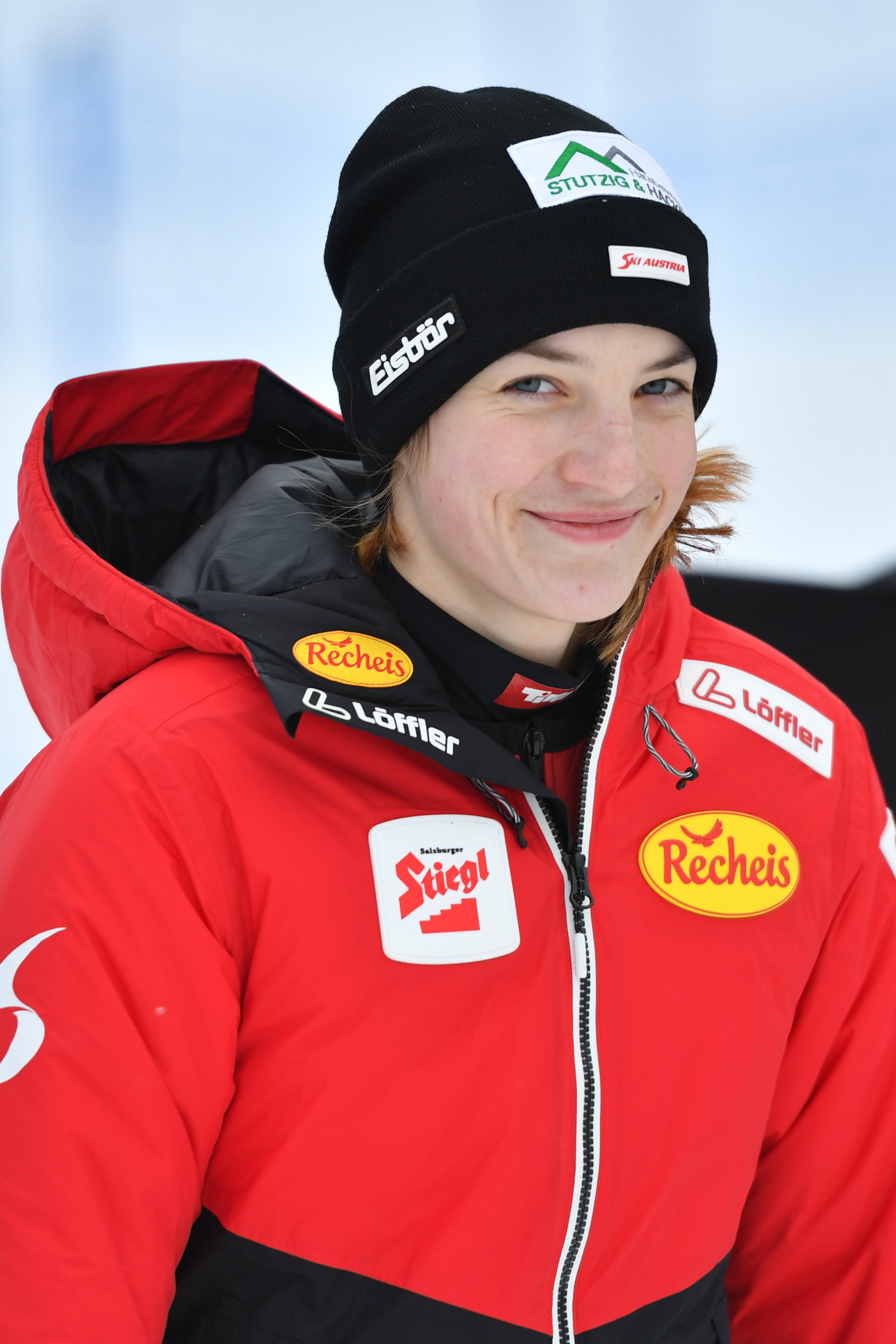

Personal information
- Nationality: Austria
- Born: 3 October 2003 (age 22) Leoben, Austria

Sport
- Sport: Skiing
- Club: SC Erzbergland

World Cup career
- Seasons: 2020–present
Medal record
Nordic combined
Representing Austria
World Championships
Bronze medal – third place	2023 Planica	Mixed team
Bronze medal – third place	2025 Trondheim	Individual NH
Bronze medal – third place	2025 Trondheim	Mixed team
Winter Youth Olympic Games
Gold medal – first place	2020 Lausanne	Individual
World Junior Championships
Gold medal – first place	2023 Whistler	Mixed team NH
Silver medal – second place	2021 Lahti	Mixed team NH
Bronze medal – third place	2023 Whistler	Individual NH
Bronze medal – third place	2022 Zakopane	Mixed team NH
Bronze medal – third place	2021 Lahti	Individual NH
Bronze medal – third place	2020 Oberwiesenthal	Individual NH
Ski jumping
Youth Olympic Games
Gold medal – first place	2020 Lausanne	Mixed team NH
- Updated on 11 February 2024

Lisa-Marie Hirner (born 3 October 2003) is an Austrian Nordic combined skier and ski jumper.

== Career ==
Hirner, who competes for SC Erzbergland, made her international debut on 7 January 2017 at the Youth Cup competition in Harrachov, Czech Republic, where she finished third place on the middle hill and over 4 kilometers behind Gyda Westvold Hansen and Jenny Nowak. She also finished third place in her debut in the Nordic Combined Alpine Cup in March 2017. In the following months, she regularly competed in Youth Cup and Alpine Cup competitions in Nordic Combined and ski jumping and was extremely successful. While she celebrated her first ski jumping Alpine Cup victory on 5 August 2018 in Klingenthal, she also won her first Alpine Cup competition in the combination five days later in Bischofsgrün.

With these successes behind her, Hirner competed in the 2018 Nordic Combined Grand Prix, which was held for the first time for women, on 18 August 2018, and achieved fourth place in both competitions using the Gundersen method. Nevertheless, at the beginning of the winter she initially competed in the Alpine Cup again, which she dominated in the early stages. On 6 January 2019, Hirner made her debut in the Nordic Combined Continental Cup in Otepää, Estonia, which was the highest competition series for women. She immediately demonstrated her talent by achieving second place behind Tara Geraghty-Moats. At the first official junior women's competition at the 2019 Nordic Junior World Ski Championships in Lahti, Hirner narrowly missed the medal ranks in fifth place. In the team competition for special ski jumpers, however, she managed to make it onto the podium in third place together with Marita Kramer, Claudia Purker and Lisa Eder. Hirner finished the season ninth in the Continental Cup, fourth in the Nordic Combined Alpine Cup and winner of the Ski Jumping Alpine Cup.

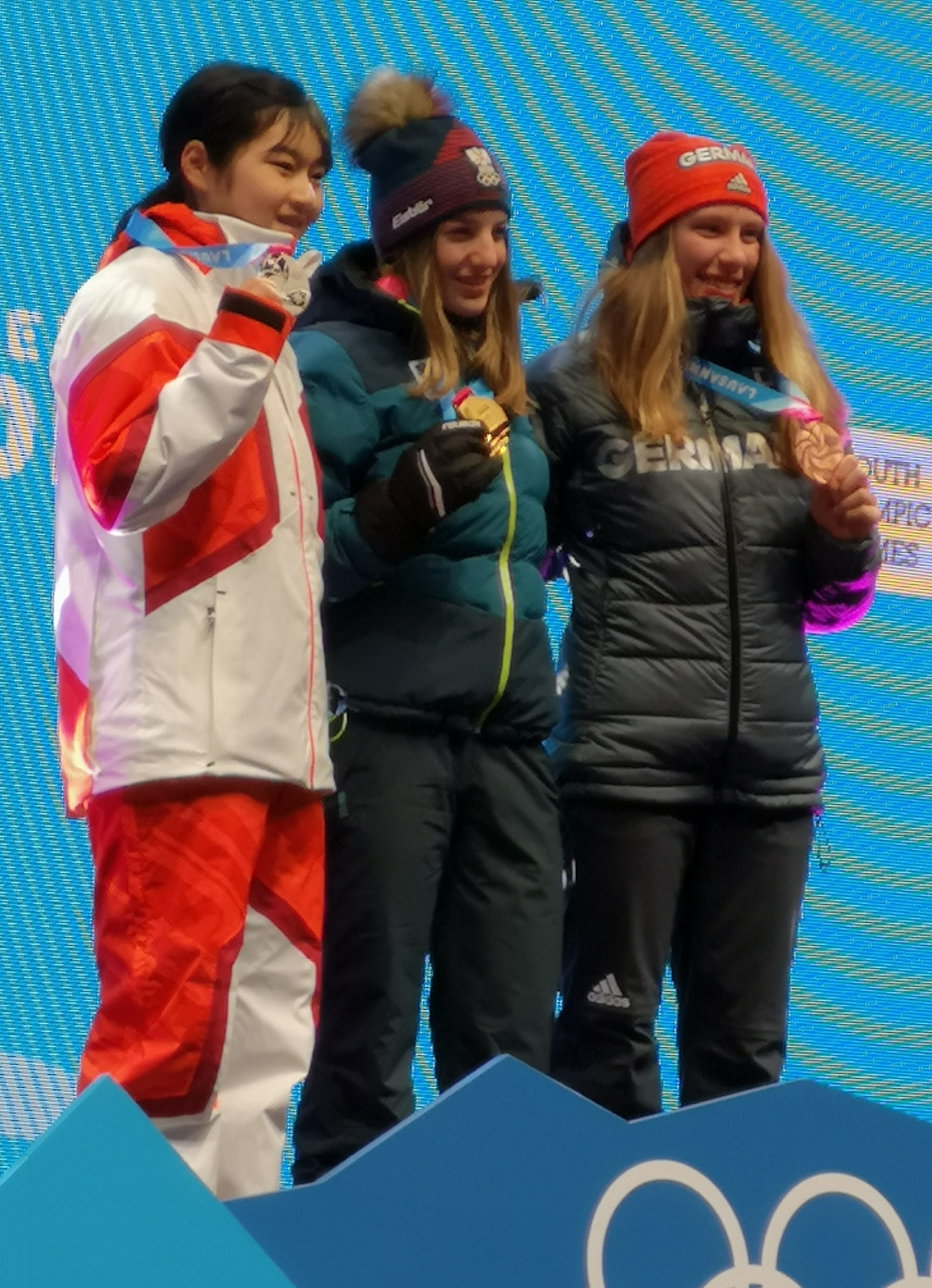
Hirner (centre) at the Podium at the 2020 Winter Youth Olympics

In October 2019, Hirner became the first Austrian national champion in Nordic combined. At the 2020 Winter Youth Olympics in Prémanon, Hirner won the gold medal both in the individual event ahead of Ayane Miyazaki and with the mixed team. She was selected as the flag bearer for the closing ceremony. At the Austrian Junior Championships on 1 and 2 February 2020 in Eisenerz, Hirner won the championship title in both the Gundersen individual over 5 km and over 2.5 km. It was not until February 2020 that Hirner entered the Continental Cup season and was able to take third place against a strong field of participants. She also achieved this at the 2020 Nordic Junior World Ski Championships in Oberwiesenthal in the Gundersen individual behind Jenny Nowak and Gyda Westvold Hansen. In the first mixed team competition, however, she narrowly missed out on a medal, finishing fourth together with Johannes Lamparter, Sigrun Kleinrath and Manuel Einkemmer. At the end of the season in Nizhny Tagil, Hirner was on the podium on both days of the competition and ultimately finished the Continental Cup in seventh place in the overall ranking. She was also the overall winner of the Alpine Cup.

In November 2020, Hirner took second place in the vote for the Piotr Nurowski Prize for exceptional achievements in European junior sport, which gave her prize money of $8,000 for training courses. On 18 December 2020, Hirner took part in the historic first World Cup competition in Ramsau am Dachstein and finished in sixth place. After a break from competition of several weeks, the first Continental Cup competitions of the season took place in Eisenerz from 22 to 24 January 2021. After a ninth place on the first day of competition, Hirner achieved two podium places on the following days with third and second place. A few weeks later, Hirner traveled again to the Nordic Junior World Ski Championships in Lahti. After the ski jumping, which Hirner finished seventh, more than a minute behind the leader Gyda Westvold Hansen, a title win was already out of the question, but the medal ranks were certainly within reach. In fact, she managed to overtake several athletes with the second-best running time and ultimately win bronze, as she did last year. At the 2021 Nordic World Ski Championships in Oberstdorf, Hirner went onto the track after the ski jumping run more than a minute and a half behind the leader. With the sixth-best running time, she managed to improve by several places and finally finished eighth as the best Austrian. Hirner finished the season in fourth place in the Continental Cup.

Hirner won her second title at the 2021 Austrian National Championships in Stams. At the start of the World Cup season in Lillehammer at the beginning of December, Hirner took fourth place on the first day of competition before achieving the first Austrian podium finish in the World Cup in third place the following day. On 7 January 2022, Hirner was part of the Austrian mixed relay team in Val di Fiemme, together with Martin Fritz, Annalena Slamik and Lukas Greiderer, which took second place in the historically first mixed team competition in the World Cup. The next day, she made it onto the podium again in the mass start.

== Personal life ==
Hirner grew up in a sporting family with two younger brothers (twins). She is the niece of the former ski jumper Adolf Hirner and her father Günther Hirner also practiced this sport. In her youth she was a versatile association football player and also trained in judo for a few years. Hirner attended the sports branch of the polytechnic school in Eisenerz. Since autumn 201,9 she has been doing her vocational training "apprenticeship with Matura" as a designer at the Nordic Training Center (NAZ) in Eisenerz. Her personal motto is "If you give everything, you can't blame yourself for anything".
