= Ida Marie Hagen =

Norwegian Nordic combined skier (born 2000)

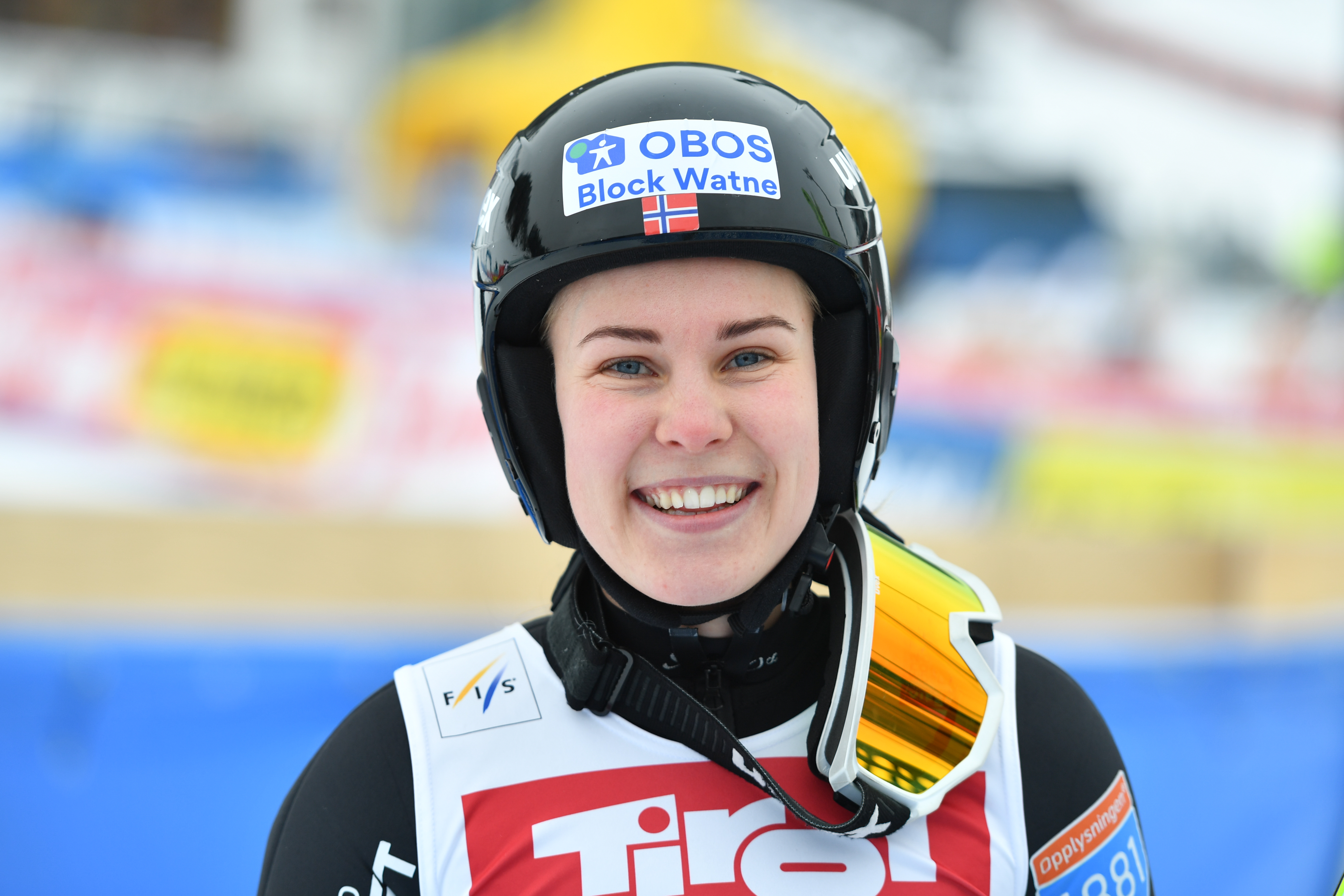
- Ida Marie Hagen in 2023

Personal information
- Nationality: Norway
- Born: 18 August 2000 (age 26)

Sport
- Sport: Skiing
- Club: Haslum IL

World Cup career
- Seasons: 2021–present
- Indiv. starts: 60
- Indiv. podiums: 46
- Indiv. wins: 28
- Team starts: 3
- Team podiums: 3
- Team wins: 3
- Overall titles: 2 (2024, 2026)
- Discipline titles: 7 – (4 BST: 2023, 2024, 2025, 2026, 2 Com: 2024, 2026, 1 MST: 2026)
Medal record
Women's Nordic combined
Representing Norway
World Championships
Gold medal – first place	2023 Planica	Mixed team NH
Gold medal – first place	2025 Trondheim	Mixed team NH
Silver medal – second place	2025 Trondheim	Individual NH
- Updated on 15 March 2026

Ida Marie Hagen (born 18 August 2000) is a Norwegian Nordic combined athlete.

== Career ==
At the Norwegian Championships in November 2018, Hagen was runner-up behind Gyda Westvold Hansen. She was able to maintain this position as the second best Norwegian throughout the entire winter. In December 2018 she made her debut in the Continental Cup, which was still the highest competition series for women this season. With a total of four placements in the top ten, Hagen established itself among the world's best and ultimately reached seventh place in the overall ranking.

On 11 December 2021, Hagen achieved her first World Cup podium finish by finishing second in the mass start competition in Otepää. Hagen was second overall in the world cup in combined 2021/22, behind Gyda Westvold Hansen.

On 16 December 2023, Hagen recorded her fist win in World Cup - finishing first in the Individual Compact Normal Hill competition in Ramsau.

== Nordic combined results ==
All results are sourced from the International Ski Federation (FIS).

=== World Championships ===
- 3 medals – (2 gold, 1 silver)

Year	Age	Normal Hill	Mass Start Normal Hill	Mixed Team
2023	22	4	—N/a	Gold
2025	24	Silver	10	Gold

=== World Cup ===
==== Season titles ====
- 9 titles – (2 Overall, 4 BST, 2 Com Trophy, 1 MST)

Season	Discipline
2023	Best Skier Trophy
2024	Overall
2024	Best Skier Trophy
2024	Compact Trophy
2025	Best Skier Trophy
2026	Overall
2026	Best Skier Trophy
2026	Compact Trophy
2026	Mass Start Trophy

==== Season standings ====
Season	Age	Overall	Best Jumper Trophy	Best Skier Trophy	Compact Trophy	Mass Start Trophy
2022	21	2nd place, silver medalist(s)	4	2nd place, silver medalist(s)	—N/a	—N/a
2023	22	3rd place, bronze medalist(s)	10	1st place, gold medalist(s)	—N/a	—N/a
2024	23	1st place, gold medalist(s)	3rd place, bronze medalist(s)	1st place, gold medalist(s)	1st place, gold medalist(s)	—N/a
2025	24	2nd place, silver medalist(s)	6	1st place, gold medalist(s)	2nd place, silver medalist(s)	2nd place, silver medalist(s)
2026	25	1st place, gold medalist(s)	3	1st place, gold medalist(s)	1st place, gold medalist(s)	1st place, gold medalist(s)

==== Individual podiums ====
- 28 wins – (27 NH, 1 LH)
- 46 podiums – (42 NH, 4 LH)

No.	Season	Date	Location	Hill	Size	Discipline	Place
1	2021–22	11 December 2021	Otepää, Estonia	Tehvandi	NH	5 km/HS97	2nd place, silver medalist(s)
2	2021–22	12 December 2021	Otepää, Estonia	Tehvandi	NH	HS97/5 km	2nd place, silver medalist(s)
3	2022–23	3 December 2022	Lillehammer, Norway	Lysgårdsbakken	NH	HS100/5 km	2nd place, silver medalist(s)
4	2022–23	27 January 2023	Seefeld, Austria	Toni-Seelos-Olympiaschanze	NH	HS109/5 km	3rd place, bronze medalist(s)
5	2022–23	12 February 2023	Schonach, Germany	Langenwaldschanze	NH	HS100/5 km	2nd place, silver medalist(s)
6	2022–23	11 March 2023	Oslo, Norway	Midtstubakken	NH	HS106/5 km	2nd place, silver medalist(s)
7	2023–24	1 December 2023	Lillehammer, Norway	Lysgårdsbakken	NH	HS98/5 km	2nd place, silver medalist(s)
8	2023–24	2 December 2023	Lillehammer, Norway	Lysgårdsbakken	NH	HS98/5 km	2nd place, silver medalist(s)
9	2023–24	15 December 2023	Ramsau, Austria	W90-Mattensprunganlage	NH	HS98/5 km	2nd place, silver medalist(s)
10	2023–24	16 December 2023	Ramsau, Austria	W90-Mattensprunganlage	NH	COM HS98/5 km	1st place, gold medalist(s)
11	2023–24	13 January 2024	Oberstdorf, Germany	Allgäu	NH	HS106/5 km	2nd place, silver medalist(s)
12	2023–24	14 January 2024	Oberstdorf, Germany	Allgäu	NH	COM HS106/5 km	1st place, gold medalist(s)
13	2023–24	27 January 2024	Schonach, Germany	Langenwaldschanze	NH	HS100/4 km	2nd place, silver medalist(s)
14	2023–24	28 January 2024	Schonach, Germany	Langenwaldschanze	NH	HS100/8 km	1st place, gold medalist(s)
15	2023–24	2 February 2024	Seefeld, Austria	Toni-Seelos-Olympiaschanze	NH	HS109/5 km	1st place, gold medalist(s)
16	2023–24	3 February 2024	Seefeld, Austria	Toni-Seelos-Olympiaschanze	NH	COM HS109/5 km	1st place, gold medalist(s)
17	2023–24	9 February 2024	Otepää, Estonia	Tehvandi	NH	5 km/HS97	2nd place, silver medalist(s)
18	2023–24	10 February 2024	Otepää, Estonia	Tehvandi	NH	HS97/5 km	1st place, gold medalist(s)
19	2023–24	11 February 2024	Otepää, Estonia	Tehvandi	NH	HS97/5 km	1st place, gold medalist(s)
20	2023–24	9 March 2024	Oslo, Norway	Midtstubakken	NH	HS106/5 km	1st place, gold medalist(s)
21	2023–24	17 March 2024	Trondheim, Norway	Granåsen	NH	HS105/7.5 km	1st place, gold medalist(s)
22	2024–25	6 December 2024	Lillehammer, Norway	Lysgårdsbakken	NH	HS98/5 km	1st place, gold medalist(s)
23	2024–25	7 December 2024	Lillehammer, Norway	Lysgårdsbakken	NH	COM HS98/5 km	1st place, gold medalist(s)
24	2024–25	20 December 2024	Ramsau, Austria	W90-Mattensprunganlage	NH	5 km/HS98	1st place, gold medalist(s)
25	2024–25	21 December 2024	Ramsau, Austria	W90-Mattensprunganlage	NH	COM HS98/5 km	1st place, gold medalist(s)
26	2024–25	18 January 2025	Schonach, Germany	Langenwaldschanze	NH	HS100/4 km	1st place, gold medalist(s)
27	2024–25	19 January 2025	Schonach, Germany	Langenwaldschanze	NH	COM HS100/6 km	1st place, gold medalist(s)
28	2024–25	31 January 2025	Seefeld, Austria	Toni-Seelos-Olympiaschanze	NH	5 km/HS109	1st place, gold medalist(s)
29	2024–25	8 February 2025	Otepää, Estonia	Tehvandi	NH	HS97/5 km	1st place, gold medalist(s)
30	2024–25	9 February 2025	Otepää, Estonia	Tehvandi	NH	COM HS97/5 km	2nd place, silver medalist(s)
31	2024–25	15 March 2025	Oslo, Norway	Holmenkollbakken	LH	HS134/5 km	3rd place, bronze medalist(s)
32	2024–25	16 March 2025	Oslo, Norway	Holmenkollbakken	LH	COM HS134/5 km	2nd place, silver medalist(s)
33	2025–26	5 December 2025	Trondheim, Norway	Granåsen	NH	HS102/5 km	1st place, gold medalist(s)
34	2025–26	6 December 2025	Trondheim, Norway	Granåsen	NH	5 km/HS102	2nd place, silver medalist(s)
35	2025–26	19 December 2025	Ramsau, Austria	W90-Mattensprunganlage	NH	5 km/HS98	1st place, gold medalist(s)
36	2025–26	20 December 2025	Ramsau, Austria	W90-Mattensprunganlage	NH	HS98/5 km	1st place, gold medalist(s)
37	2025–26	9 January 2026	Otepää, Estonia	Tehvandi	NH	5 km/HS97	1st place, gold medalist(s)
38	2025–26	10 January 2026	Otepää, Estonia	Tehvandi	NH	HS97/5 km	1st place, gold medalist(s)
39	2025–26	11 January 2026	Otepää, Estonia	Tehvandi	NH	COM HS97/5 km	1st place, gold medalist(s)
40	2025–26	17 January 2026	Oberhof, Germany	Kanzlersgrund	NH	COM HS100/5 km	1st place, gold medalist(s)
41	2025–26	18 January 2026	Oberhof, Germany	Kanzlersgrund	NH	HS100/5 km	1st place, gold medalist(s)
42	2025–26	30 January 2026	Seefeld, Austria	Toni-Seelos-Olympiaschanze	NH	5 km/HS109	3rd place, bronze medalist(s)
43	2025–26	31 January 2026	Seefeld, Austria	Toni-Seelos-Olympiaschanze	NH	COM HS109/5 km	1st place, gold medalist(s)
44	2025–26	1 February 2026	Seefeld, Austria	Toni-Seelos-Olympiaschanze	NH	HS109/7.5 km	1st place, gold medalist(s)
45	2025–26	6 March 2026	Lahti, Finland	Salpausselkä	LH	HS130/5 km	2nd place, silver medalist(s)
46	2025–26	15 March 2026	Oslo, Norway	Holmenkollbakken	LH	HS134/5 km	1st place, gold medalist(s)

== Personal life ==
Ida Marie is the older sister of Nordic combined athlete Mille Marie Hagen.
