= FIS Nordic World Ski Championships 2023 – Mixed team normal hill/2 × 2.5 km/2 × 5 km =

Mixed team normal hill/2 × 2.5 km/2 × 5 km at the FIS Nordic World Ski Championships 2023
- Venue: Planica Nordic Centre
- Location: Planica, Slovenia
- Dates: 26 February
- Competitors: 32 from 8 nations
- Teams: 8
- Winning time: 37:38.2

Medalists
gold medal	Jens Lurås Oftebro; Ida Marie Hagen; Gyda Westvold Hansen; Jarl Magnus Riiber	Norway
silver medal	Vinzenz Geiger; Jenny Nowak; Nathalie Armbruster; Julian Schmid	Germany
bronze medal	Stefan Rettenegger; Annalena Slamik; Lisa Hirner; Johannes Lamparter	Austria

The Mixed team normal hill/2 × 2.5 km/2 × 5 km competition at the FIS Nordic World Ski Championships 2023 was held on 26 February 2023.

== Results ==
=== Ski jumping ===
The ski jumping part was started at 12:42.

Rank	Bib	Name	Distance (m)	Points	Time difference
1	7	Norway; Ida Marie Hagen; Jens Lurås Oftebro; Jarl Magnus Riiber; Gyda Westvold Hansen	87.0; 99.5; 100.0; 96.5	461.8; 96.7; 117.3; 128.1; 119.7	
2	5	Japan; Yuna Kasai; Akito Watabe; Ryōta Yamamoto; Haruka Kasai	94.0; 92.0; 99.0; 89.0	456.5; 104.3; 117.8; 128.7; 105.7	+0:05
3	8	Germany; Jenny Nowak; Vinzenz Geiger; Julian Schmid; Nathalie Armbruster	88.0; 94.0; 94.5; 91.0	436.6; 98.5; 110.8; 119.8; 107.5	+0:25
4	6	Austria; Annalena Slamik; Johannes Lamparter; Stefan Rettenegger; Lisa Hirner	85.5; 99.0; 95.0; 88.0	431.9; 89.6; 127.1; 118.9; 96.3	+0:30
5	4	Italy; Veronica Gianmoena; Aaron Kostner; Samuel Costa; Annika Sieff	90.5; 87.0; 89.0; 88.5	412.6; 95.8; 102.9; 105.2; 108.7	+0:49
6	3	Finland; Minja Korhonen; Eero Hirvonen; Ilkka Herola; Alva Thors	79.0; 92.5; 93.0; 72.5	377.0; 74.5; 113.0; 110.0; 79.5	+1:25
7	2	Slovenia; Silva Verbič; Matic Garbajs; Gašper Brecl; Ema Volavšek	78.0; 88.0; 91.0; 87.0	359.9; 75.3; 96.3; 97.3; 91.0	+1:42
8	1	United States; Alexa Brabec; Niklas Malacinski; Ben Loomis; Annika Malacinski	69.0; 93.0; 89.0; 72.5	343.7; 57.8; 112.3; 108.8; 64.8	+1:58

=== Cross-country skiing ===
The cross-country skiing part was started at 15:00.

Rank	Bib	Country	Deficit	Time	Rank	Finish time	Deficit
1st place, gold medalist(s)	1	Norway; Jens Lurås Oftebro; Ida Marie Hagen; Gyda Westvold Hansen; Jarl Magnus Riiber	0:00	37:38.2; 11:51.5; 6:47.8; 7:01.8; 11:57.1	1	37:38.2	
2nd place, silver medalist(s)	3	Germany; Vinzenz Geiger; Jenny Nowak; Nathalie Armbruster; Julian Schmid	0:25	38:01.0; 11:45.5; 7:10.3; 7:03.5; 12:01.7	2	38:26.0	+47.8
3rd place, bronze medalist(s)	4	Austria; Stefan Rettenegger; Annalena Slamik; Lisa Hirner; Johannes Lamparter	0:30	38:08.2; 11:56.4; 7:22.5; 6:54.9; 11:54.4	3	38:38.2	+1:00.0
4	5	Italy; Aaron Kostner; Annika Sieff; Veronica Gianmoena; Samuel Costa	0:49	38:42.7; 12:11.7; 7:09.9; 7:07.0; 12:14.1	4	39:31.7	+1:53.5
5	2	Japan; Ryōta Yamamoto; Yuna Kasai; Haruka Kasai; Akito Watabe	0:05	39:35.7; 12:44.5; 7:21.0; 7:05.1; 12:25.1	5	39:40.7	+2:02.5
6	6	Finland; Eero Hirvonen; Minja Korhonen; Alva Thors; Ilkka Herola	1:25	39:45.3; 12:11.0; 7:26.5; 7:29.4; 12:38.4	6	41:10.3	+3:32.1
7	8	United States; Alexa Brabec; Niklas Malacinski; Ben Loomis; Annika Malacinski	1:58	40:01.1; 12:46.2; 7:12.2; 7:21.3; 12:41.4	7	41:59.1	+4:20.9
8	7	Slovenia; Gašper Brecl; Ema Volavšek; Silva Verbič; Matic Garbajs	1:42	43:06.5; 13:26.2; 7:21.2; 8:00.8; 14:18.3	8	44:48.5	+7:10.3
