= FIS Nordic World Ski Championships 2025 – Mixed team normal hill/2 × 2.5 km/2 × 5 km =

Mixed team normal hill/2 × 2.5 km/2 × 5 km at the FIS Nordic World Ski Championships 2025
- Venue: Granåsen Ski Centre
- Location: Trondheim, Norway
- Dates: 28 February
- Competitors: 40 from 10 nations
- Teams: 10
- Winning time: 36:37.5

Medalists
| gold medal | Jens Lurås Oftebro; Gyda Westvold Hansen; Ida Marie Hagen; Jarl Magnus Riiber | Norway |
| silver medal | Julian Schmid; Jenny Nowak; Nathalie Armbruster; Vinzenz Geiger | Germany |
| bronze medal | Stefan Rettenegger; Claudia Purker; Lisa Hirner; Johannes Lamparter | Austria |

The Mixed team normal hill/2 × 2.5 km/2 × 5 km competition at the FIS Nordic World Ski Championships 2025 was held on 28 February 2025.

== Results ==
=== Ski jumping ===
The ski jumping was started at 12:00.

| Rank | Bib | Country | Distance (m) | Points | Time difference |
|---|---|---|---|---|---|
| 1 | 9 | Norway; Ida Marie Hagen; Jens Lurås Oftebro; Jarl Magnus Riiber; Gyda Westvold Hansen | 95.0; 99.5; 107.0; 102.0 | 471.9; 105.5; 117.7; 133.1; 115.8 | |
| 2 | 7 | Japan; Haruka Kasai; Ryota Yamamoto; Akito Watabe; Yuna Kasai | 100.0; 106.0; 98.5; 94.5 | 458.3; 118.5; 133.9; 109.2; 96.7 | +0:14 |
| 3 | 10 | Germany; Jenny Nowak; Vinzenz Geiger; Julian Schmid; Nathalie Armbruster | 94.5; 102.5; 103.5; 93.5 | 443.9; 105.2; 121.2; 122.2; 95.3 | +0:28 |
| 4 | 8 | Austria; Claudia Purker; Stefan Rettenegger; Johannes Lamparter; Lisa Hirner | 86.5; 96.5; 99.5; 96.5 | 426.9; 96.8; 111.2; 113.9; 105.0 | +0:45 |
| 5 | 4 | United States; Annika Malacinski; Niklas Malacinski; Ben Loomis; Alexa Brabec | 86.0; 89.0; 95.5; 102.0 | 393.8; 86.8; 96.0; 104.1; 106.9 | +1:20 |
| 6 | 3 | Slovenia; Tia Malovrh; Gašper Brecl; Vid Vrhovnik; Ema Volavšek | 93.0; 89.0; 90.0; 90.5 | 374.6; 103.3; 93.2; 88.7; 89.4 | +1:37 |
| 7 | 5 | France; Marion Droz Vincent; Gaël Blondeau; Laurent Muhlethaler; Léna Brocard | 82.0; 87.0; 94.5; 87.5 | 359.9; 79.1; 89.7; 108.4; 82.7 | +1:52 |
| 8 | 6 | Finland; Minja Korhonen; Eero Hirvonen; Ilkka Herola; Heta Hirvonen | 90.5; 75.5; 101.0; 92.0 | 358.8; 96.9; 60.3; 115.4; 86.2 | +1:53 |
| 9 | 2 | Italy; Daniela Dejori; Aaron Kostner; Alessandro Pittin; Veronica Gianmoena | 78.0; 91.0; 81.0; 81.5 | 309.8; 71.1; 99.3; 70.4; 69.0 | +2:42 |
| 10 | 1 | Czech Republic; Tereza Koldovská; Jiří Konvalinka; Jan Vytrval; Jolana Hradilová | 65.0; 86.5; 86.5; 65.0 | 248.7; 39.1; 90.1; 88.9; 30.6 | +3:43 |

=== Cross-country skiing ===
The cross-country skiing part was started at 15:00.

| Rank | Bib | Country | Deficit | Time | Rank | Finish time | Deficit |
|---|---|---|---|---|---|---|---|
| 1st place, gold medalist(s) | 1 | Norway; Jens Lurås Oftebro; Gyda Westvold Hansen; Ida Marie Hagen; Jarl Magnus Riiber | 0:00 | 36:37.5; 11:14.0; 6:34.1; 6:43.0; 12:06.4 | 1 | 36:37.5 | |
| 2nd place, silver medalist(s) | 3 | Germany; Julian Schmid; Jenny Nowak; Nathalie Armbruster; Vinzenz Geiger | 0:28 | 37:26.3; 11:29.1; 6:54.2; 6:55.4; 12:07.6 | 2 | 37:54.3 | +1:16.8 |
| 3rd place, bronze medalist(s) | 4 | Austria; Stefan Rettenegger; Claudia Purker; Lisa Hirner; Johannes Lamparter | 0:45 | 37:47.6; 11:32.7; 7:06.6; 6:54.3; 12:14.0 | 5 | 38:32.6 | +1:55.1 |
| 4 | 2 | Japan; Akito Watabe; Yuna Kasai; Haruka Kasai; Ryota Yamamoto | 0:14 | 38:18.8; 11:55.5; 6:57.7; 6:44.7; 12:14.0 | 7 | 38:32.8 | +1:55.3 |
| 5 | 8 | Finland; Eero Hirvonen; Minja Korhonen; Heta Hirvonen; Ilkka Herola | 1:53 | 37:33.0; 11:30.5; 6:42.5; 7:10.6; 12:09.4 | 4 | 39:26.0 | +2:48.5 |
| 6 | 7 | France; Gaël Blondeau; Léna Brocard; Marion Droz Vincent; Laurent Muhlethaler | 1:52 | 38:06.0; 11:31.0; 6:44.5; 7:28.5; 12:22.0 | 6 | 39:58.0 | +3:20.5 |
| 7 | 6 | Slovenia; Vid Vrhovnik; Ema Volavšek; Tia Malovrh; Gašper Brecl | 1:37 | 38:21.6; 11:59.4; 6:38.2; 6:51.4; 12:52.6 | 8 | 39:58.6 | +3:21.1 |
| 8 | 9 | Italy; Aaron Kostner; Daniela Dejori; Veronica Gianmoena; Alessandro Pittin | 2:42 | 37:27.1; 11:36.9; 6:41.3; 7:00.4; 12:08.5 | 3 | 40:09.1 | +3:31.6 |
| 9 | 5 | United States; Niklas Malacinski; Alexa Brabec; Annika Malacinski; Ben Loomis | 1:18 | 39:24.3; 12:21.7; 6:55.6; 7:23.4; 12:43.6 | 9 | 40:42.3 | +4:04.8 |
| 10 | 10 | Czech Republic; Jan Vytrval; Tereza Koldovská; Jolana Hradilová; Jiří Konvalinka | 3:43 | 40:14.9; 11:58.5; 7:18.6; 7:43.6; 13:14.2 | 10 | 43:57.9 | +7:20.4 |
