= FIS Nordic World Ski Championships 2025 – Women's individual normal hill/5 km =

Women's individual normal hill/5 km at the FIS Nordic World Ski Championships 2025
- Venue: Granåsen Ski Centre
- Location: Trondheim, Norway
- Dates: 2 March
- Competitors: 38 from 13 nations
- Winning time: 13:42.9

Medalists
gold medal	Gyda Westvold Hansen	Norway
silver medal	Ida Marie Hagen	Norway
bronze medal	Lisa Hirner	Austria

The Women's individual normal hill/5 km competition at the FIS Nordic World Ski Championships 2025 was held on 2 March 2025.

== Results ==
=== Ski jumping ===
The ski jumping was started at 12:00.

Rank	Bib	Name	Country	Distance (m)	Points	Time difference
1	8	Ingrid Låte	Norway	97.0	122.8	
2	21	Lisa Hirner	Austria	98.0	110.2	+0:50
3	36	Ida Marie Hagen	Norway	94.5	106.6	+1:05
4	12	Teja Pavec	Slovenia	97.5	105.0	+1:11
5	34	Gyda Westvold Hansen	Norway	98.0	104.8	+1:12
6	31	Jenny Nowak	Germany	96.0	104.6	+1:13
7	37	Haruka Kasai	Japan	95.5	101.7	+1:24
8	30	Maria Gerboth	Germany	93.5	101.0	+1:27
9	35	Yuna Kasai	Japan	94.0	100.5	+1:29
10	23	Annalena Slamik	Austria	93.0	99.8	+1:32
11	3	Kira Mária Kapustíková	Slovakia	92.0	98.6	+1:37
12	18	Ronja Loh	Germany	91.5	95.7	+1:48
13	29	Ema Volavšek	Slovenia	89.5	93.9	+1:56
14	28	Alexa Brabec	United States	91.0	93.7	+1:56
15	4	Karina Kozlova	Ukraine	88.0	93.3	+1:58
16	19	Heta Hirvonen	Finland	92.5	92.9	+2:00
17	27	Claudia Purker	Austria	87.5	92.5	+2:01
18	9	Tia Malovrh	Slovenia	88.0	91.2	+2:06
19	26	Marte Leinan Lund	Norway	89.5	88.9	+2:16
20	38	Nathalie Armbruster	Germany	87.0	88.3	+2:18
21	33	Lena Brocard	France	87.0	86.8	+2:24
22	24	Yuzuki Kainuma	Japan	84.0	85.9	+2:28
23	10	Marion Droz Vincent	France	86.0	82.0	+2:43
24	32	Minja Korhonen	Finland	86.0	80.2	+2:50
25	1	Maša Likozar Brankovič	Slovenia	84.0	80.1	+2:51
26	25	Annika Malacinski	United States	83.5	79.1	+2:55
27	17	Mille Marie Hagen	Norway	84.0	78.2	+2:58
28	15	Katharina Gruber	Austria	79.0	72.4	+3:22
29	20	Sana Azegami	Japan	82.0	68.5	+3:37
30	14	Veronica Gianmoena	Italy	78.5	66.9	+3:44
31	7	Anna Senoner	Italy	77.0	63.8	+3:56
32	22	Joanna Kil	Poland	75.0	62.0	+4:03
33	13	Daniela Dejori	Italy	75.0	61.8	+4:04
34	5	Haley Brabec	United States	75.7	53.8	+4:36
35	2	Kai McKinnon	United States	70.5	48.7	+4:56
36	11	Greta Pinzani	Italy	70.5	47.6	+5:01
37	16	Tereza Koldovská	Czech Republic	68.5	43.4	+5:18
38	6	Jolana Hradilová	Czech Republic	66.0	39.4	+5:34

=== Cross-country skiing ===
The cross-country was started at 15:59.

Rank	Bib	Name	Country	Start time	Cross-country time	Cross-country rank	Finish time	Deficit
1st place, gold medalist(s)	5	Gyda Westvold Hansen	Norway	1:12	12:30.9	3	13:42.9	
2nd place, silver medalist(s)	3	Ida Marie Hagen	Norway	1:05	12:44.5	4	13:49.5	+6.6
3rd place, bronze medalist(s)	2	Lisa Hirner	Austria	0:50	13:00.4	8	13:50.4	+7.5
4	1	Ingrid Låte	Norway	0:00	14:16.3	33	14:16.3	+33.4
5	6	Jenny Nowak	Germany	1:13	13:11.0	11	14:24.0	+41.1
6	9	Yuna Kasai	Japan	1:29	12:55.3	7	14:24.3	+41.4
7	7	Haruka Kasai	Japan	1:24	13:10.0	10	14:34.0	+51.1
8	20	Nathalie Armbruster	Germany	2:18	12:27.5	1	14:45.5	+1:02.6
9	19	Marte Leinan Lund	Norway	2:16	12:30.6	2	14:46.6	+1:03.7
10	13	Ema Volavšek	Slovenia	1:56	12:51.0	5	14:47.0	+1:04.1
11	14	Alexa Brabec	United States	1:56	12:54.2	6	14:50.2	+1:07.3
12	4	Teja Pavec	Slovenia	1:11	13:47.9	25	14:58.9	+1:16.0
13	8	Maria Gerboth	Germany	1:27	13:44.9	23	15:11.9	+1:29.0
14	18	Tia Malovrh	Slovenia	2:06	13:15.0	12	15:21.0	+1:38.1
15	17	Claudia Purker	Austria	2:01	13:21.9	19	15:22.9	+1:40.0
16	16	Heta Hirvonen	Finland	2:00	13:45.1	24	15:45.1	+2:02.2
17	21	Lena Brocard	France	2:24	13:21.8	18	15:45.8	+2:02.9
18	10	Annalena Slamik	Austria	1:32	14:21.6	34	15:53.6	+2:10.7
19	24	Minja Korhonen	Finland	2:50	13:07.4	9	15:57.4	+2:14.5
20	12	Ronja Loh	Germany	1:48	14:13.3	31	16:01.3	+2:18.4
21	22	Yuzuki Kainuma	Japan	2:28	13:34.7	21	16:02.7	+2:19.8
22	25	Maša Likozar Brankovič	Slovenia	2:51	13:21.1	17	16:12.1	+2:29.2
23	27	Mille Marie Hagen	Norway	2:58	13:29.0	20	16:27.0	+2:44.1
24	26	Annika Malacinski	United States	2:55	13:36.3	22	16:31.3	+2:48.4
25	23	Marion Droz Vincent	France	2:43	14:16.0	32	16:59.0	+3:16.1
26	30	Veronica Gianmoena	Italy	3:44	13:19.3	15	17:03.3	+3:20.4
27	28	Katharina Gruber	Austria	3:22	13:48.1	26	17:10.1	+3:27.2
28	32	Joanna Kil	Poland	4:03	13:16.2	13	17:19.2	+3:36.3
29	33	Daniela Dejori	Italy	4:04	13:19.9	16	17:23.9	+3:41.0
30	29	Sana Azegami	Japan	3:37	14:04.2	29	17:41.2	+3:58.3
31	15	Karina Kozlova	Ukraine	1:58	16:07.5	37	18:05.5	+4:22.6
32	35	Kai McKinnon	United States	4:56	13:16.7	14	18:12.7	+4:29.8
33	31	Anna Senoner	Italy	3:56	14:26.3	35	18:22.3	+4:39.4
34	34	Haley Brabec	United States	4:36	14:03.9	28	18:39.9	+4:57.0
35	36	Greta Pinzani	Italy	5:01	13:54.8	27	18:55.8	+5:12.9
36	37	Tereza Koldovská	Czech Republic	5:18	14:06.6	30	19:24.6	+5:41.7
37	11	Kira Mária Kapustíková	Slovakia	1:37	18:44.7	38	20:21.7	+6:38.8
38	38	Jolana Hradilová	Czech Republic	5:34	15:14.8	36	20:48.8	+7:05.9
