= Nathalie Armbruster =

German Nordic combined skier

Natalie Armbruster
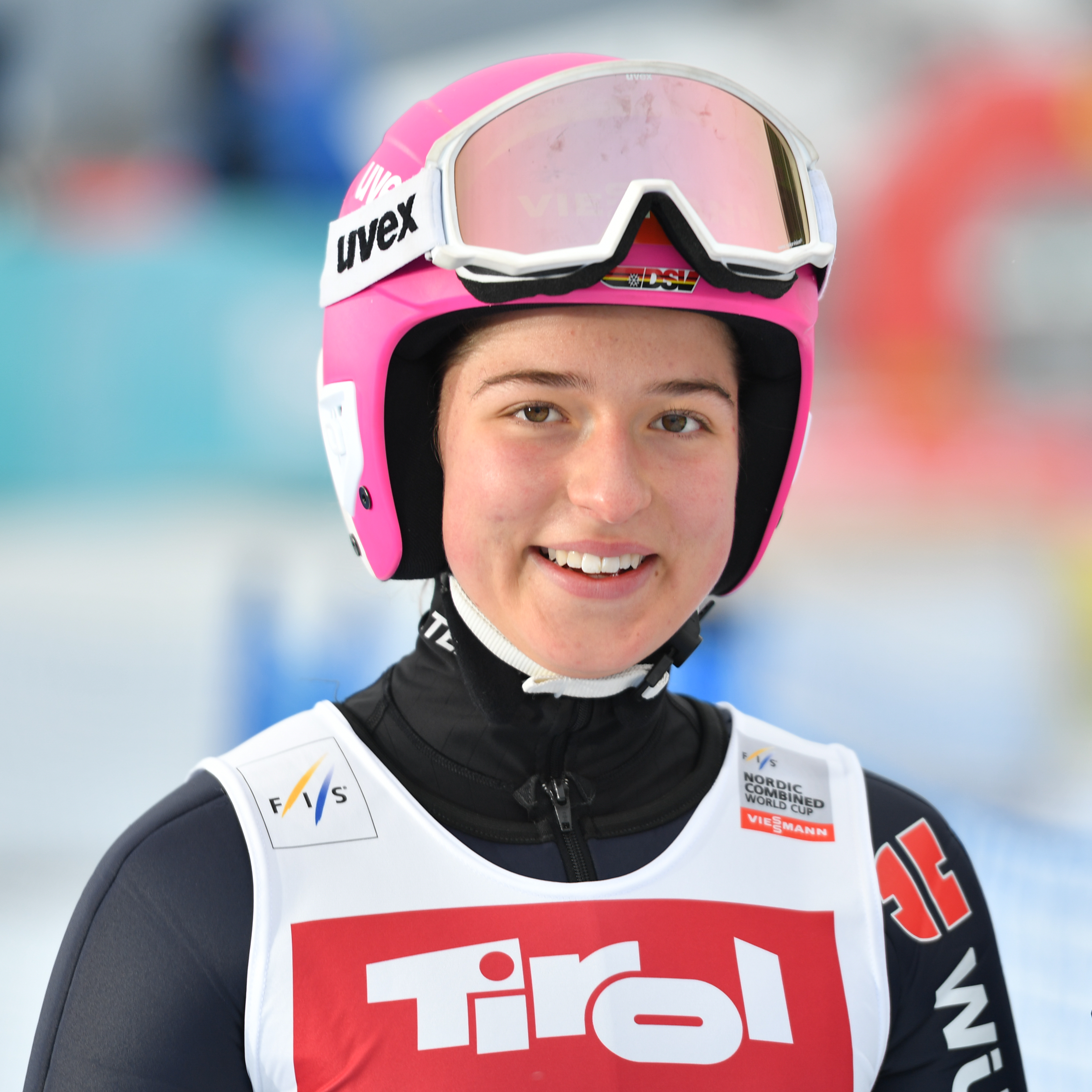
- Nathalie Armbruster in Seefeld, 2023

Personal information
- Nationality: Germany
- Born: 2 January 2006 (age 20)

Sport
- Sport: Skiing
- Club: SV-SZ Kniebis 1928

World Cup career
- Seasons: 2021–
- Indiv. starts: 41
- Indiv. podiums: 18
- Indiv. wins: 3
- Team starts: 2
- Team podiums: 2
- Team wins: 0
- Overall titles: 1 (2025)
Medal record
Women's Nordic combined
Representing Germany
World Championships
Silver medal – second place	2023 Planica	Individual NH
Silver medal – second place	2023 Planica	Mixed team
Silver medal – second place	2025 Trondheim	Mixed team
- Updated on 16 March 2025

Nathalie Armbruster (born 2 January 2006) is a German Nordic combined skier.

== Nordic combined results ==
=== World Championships ===
All results are sourced from the International Ski Federation (FIS).

=== World Championships ===
- 2 medals – (2 silver)

Year	Age	Normal hill	Mass start	Mixed team
2023	17	Silver	—N/a	Silver
2025	19	6	8	Silver

=== World Cup ===
==== Season standings ====
Season	Age	Overall	Best Jumper Trophy	Best Skier Trophy	Compact Trophy	Mass Start Trophy
2022	16	30	34	17	—N/a	—N/a
2023	17	2nd place, silver medalist(s)	3rd place, bronze medalist(s)	5	—N/a	—N/a
2024	18	5	8	2nd place, silver medalist(s)	3rd place, bronze medalist(s)	—N/a
2025	19	1st place, gold medalist(s)	4	2nd place, silver medalist(s)	1st place, gold medalist(s)	4
