= Julian Schmid (skier) =

German Nordic combined skier

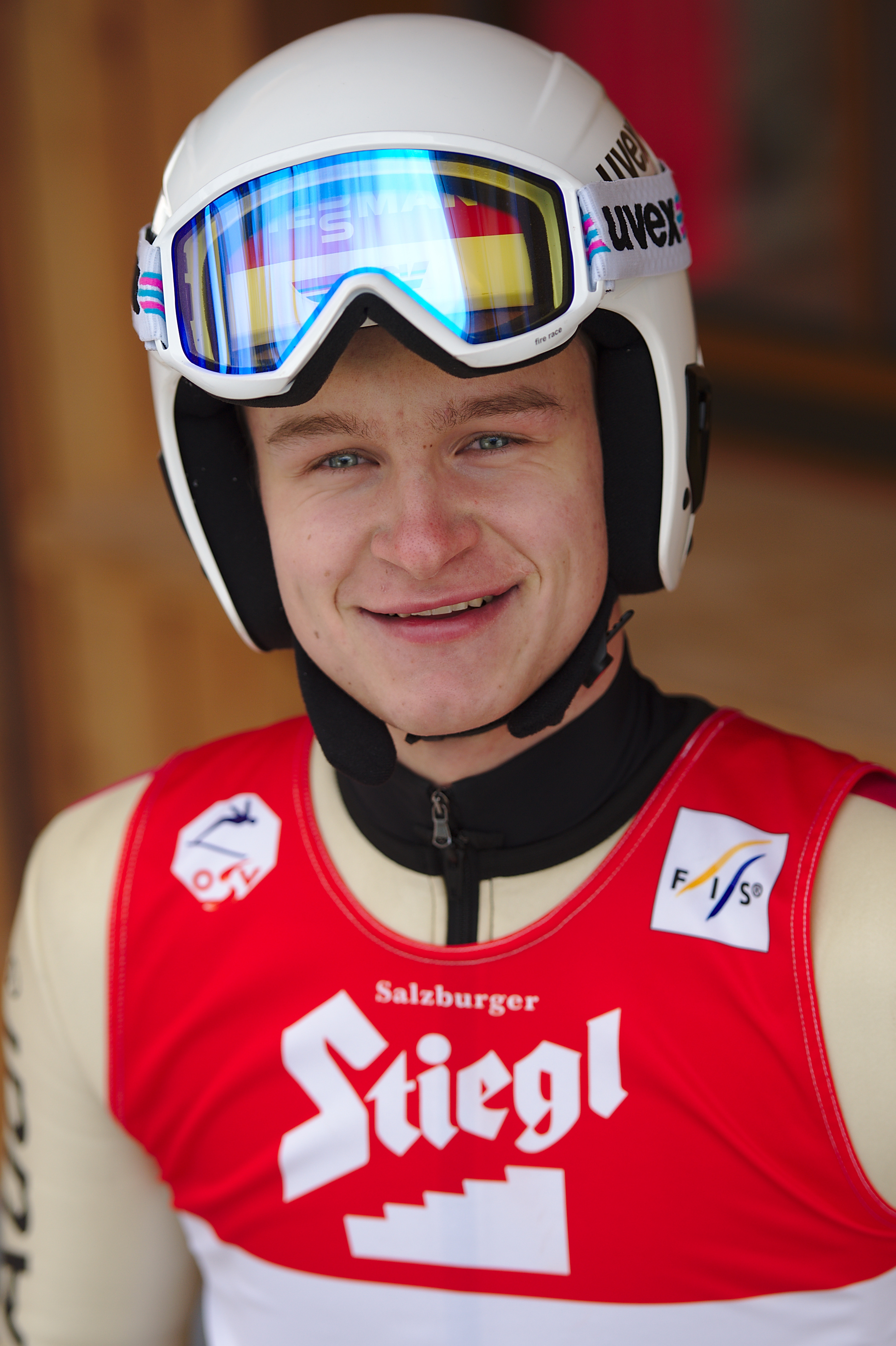
- Schmid in 2017

Personal information
- Nationality: Germany
- Born: 1 September 1999 (age 26) Oberstdorf, Germany
- Height: 1.80 m (5 ft 11 in)

Sport
- Sport: Skiing
- Club: SC 1906 Oberstdorf

World Cup career
- Seasons: 2019–
- Indiv. starts: 117
- Indiv. podiums: 16
- Indiv. wins: 3
- Team starts: 5
- Team podiums: 2
- Team wins: 1

Achievements and titles
- Personal bests: 205.0 m (672.6 ft); Oberstdorf, 17 March 2022
Medal record
Men's Nordic combined
Representing Germany
Olympic Games
Silver medal – second place	2022 Beijing	Team LH
World Championships
Gold medal – first place	2025 Trondheim	Team LH
Silver medal – second place	2023 Planica	Individual NH
Silver medal – second place	2023 Planica	Team LH
Silver medal – second place	2023 Planica	Mixed team
Silver medal – second place	2025 Trondheim	Mixed team
- Updated on 1 March 2025

Julian Schmid (born 1 September 1999) is a German Nordic combined skier.

== Career ==
=== Early career ===
Schmid, representing SC Oberstdorf and initially coached by Thomas Müller, debuted internationally at the 2014 OPA Nordic Ski Games in Gérardmer, finishing fourth in the Gundersen event. Struggling in subsequent Alpine Cup events, he gained momentum and earned silver in the 2016 OPA Games team competition. In 2017, he debuted in the Continental Cup and scored his first points in Steamboat Springs. Schmid won team silver at the 2018 Nordic Junior World Ski Championships, followed by gold and silver in 2019 Nordic Junior World Ski Championships.

=== Move to the World Cup ===
In 2019 Schmid joined Germany's senior World Cup team, earning consistent results, including a season-best 15th place in Lahti.

With international events cancelled in 2020 due to COVID-19 pandemic, Schmid competed in the German Championships, finishing ninth individually and fourth in the team sprint with Wendelin Thannheimer. He returned to action in the 2020–21 Continental Cup, claiming two victories in Park City and earning FIS Athlete of the Week honors.

At the 2022 Winter Olympics in Beijing, Schmid placed 8th on the normal hill and 10th on the large hill. In the team event, he won silver with Vinzenz Geiger, Eric Frenzel, and Manuel Faißt. He finished the season 12th in the overall World Cup standings and was named FIS "Rookie of the Year."

In summer 2022, Schmid won the mixed-team event at the Grand Prix and claimed his first individual medal (third) at the German Championships. He entered the 2022/23 World Cup season strong, with victories in Ruka, Otepää, and Oberstdorf. At the 2023 World Championships in Planica, he earned silver in the individual event behind Jarl Magnus Riiber.

Schmid's 2023/24 season was less successful, with no podium finishes, but he finished 12th in the overall standings. He began the 2024/25 season with a third-place finish in the Compact race in Ruka.

== Record ==
=== Olympic Games ===
Year	Individual NH	Individual LH	Team LH
(China) 2022 Beijing	8	10	Silver
(Italy) 2026 Milano Cortina	13	16	—

=== World Championship ===
Year	Individual LH	Individual NH	Team	Team sprint / Mixed team
2023	6	Silver	Silver	Silver
2025	4	6	—	Silver

== World Cup ==
=== Standings ===
Season	Points	Overall
2018–19	39	46
2019–20	54	32
2020–21	69	30
2021–22	480	12
2022–23	1217	3rd place, bronze medalist(s)

=== Individual victories ===
No.	Season	Date	Location	Discipline
1	2022/23	25 November 2022	(Finland) Ruka	HS142 / 5 km
2	2022/23	8 January 2023	(Estonia) Otepää	HS97 / 10 km
3	2022/23	5 February 2023	(Germany) Oberstdorf	HS137 / 10 km
