= Tara Geraghty-Moats =

American ski jumper

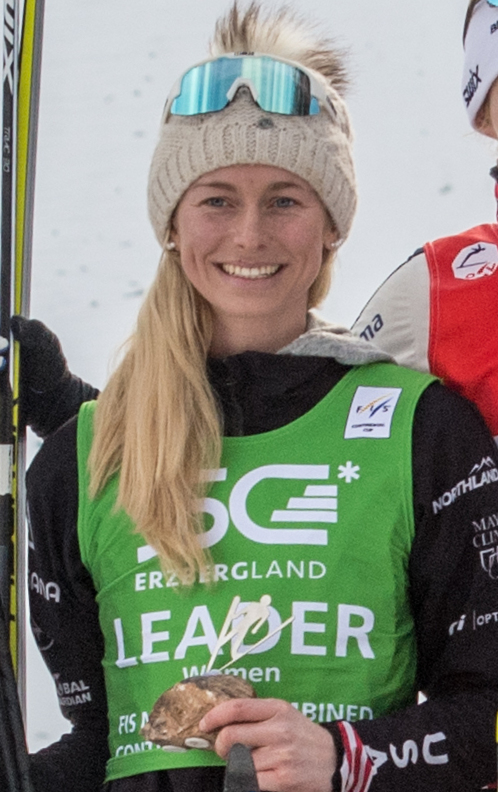
- Geraghty-Moats at the FIS Nordic Combined Continental Cup in March 2020

Personal information
- Nationality: United States
- Born: April 12, 1993 (age 33) Lebanon, New Hampshire, U.S.

Sport
- Sport: Skiing
- Club: New York Ski Educational Foundation

World Cup career
- Seasons: 2015–2019
- Indiv. starts: 42
- Team starts: 1

Achievements and titles
- Personal bests: 125 m (410 ft); Park City
- Updated on 1 February 2018

Tara Geraghty-Moats (born April 12, 1993) is an American ski jumper, Nordic combined and biathlete skier. In ski jumping she has competed at World Cup level since the 2014/15 season, with her best individual result being ninth place in Râșnov on February 8, 2015; her best team finish is seventh in Zaō on 20 January 2018.

In Nordic combined, she won the 2018/19 Continental Cup season with ten consecutive wins out of eleven competitions. In December 2020 she won the first ever Nordic combined women’s World Cup competition.

== Biathlon results ==
All results are sourced from the International Biathlon Union

=== World Championships ===
0 medals

Event	Individual	Sprint	Pursuit	Mass start	Relay	Mixed relay	Single mixed relay
(Germany) 2023 Oberhof	—	86th	—	—	—	—	—
(Czech Republic) 2024 Nové Město na Moravě	91st	58th	LAP	—	21st	—	—
