= Johannes Lamparter =

Austrian Nordic combined skier

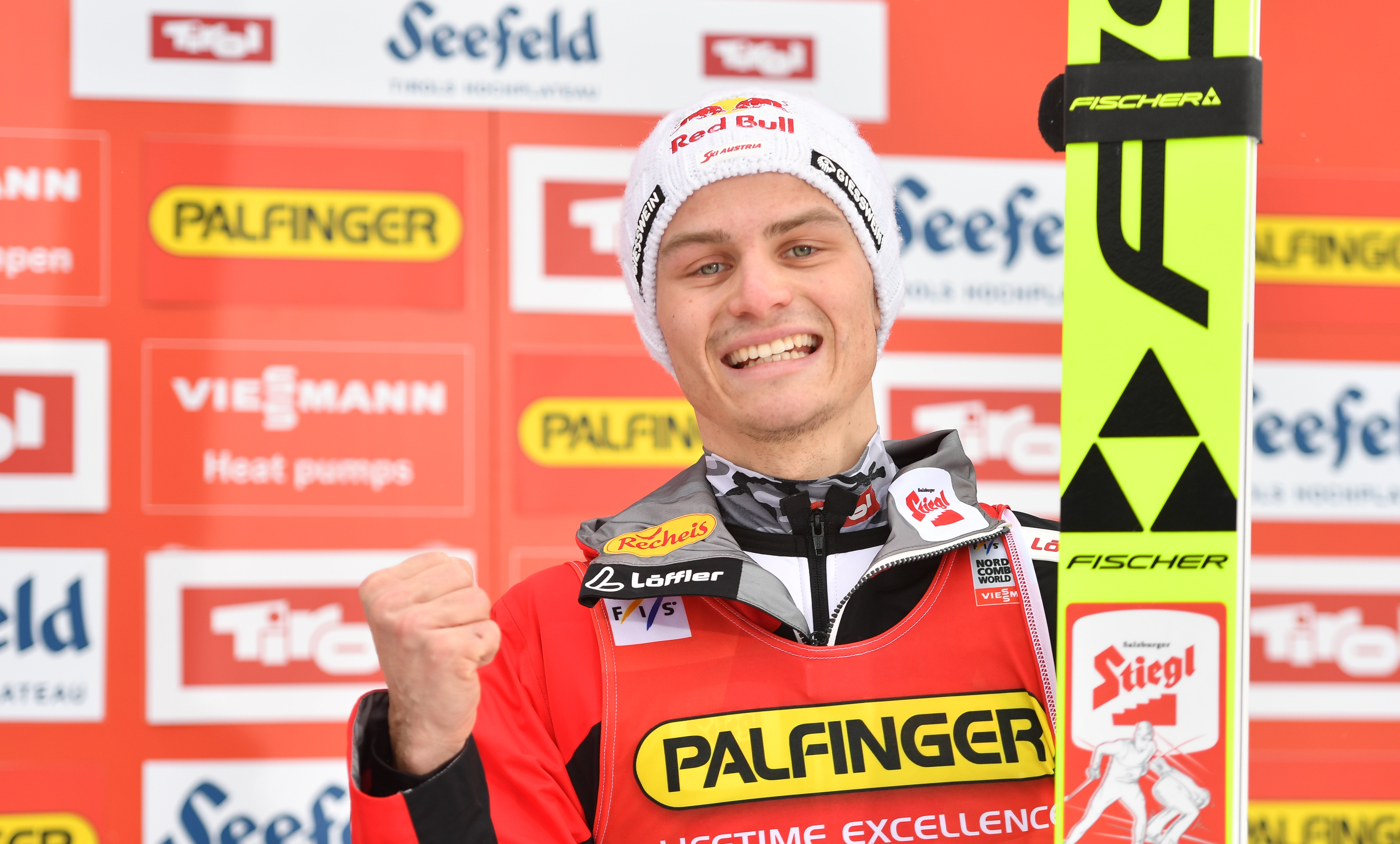

Personal information
- Nationality: Austria
- Born: 8 November 2001 (age 24) Hall in Tirol, Austria

Sport
- Sport: Skiing
- Club: Nordic Team Absam

World Cup career
- Seasons: 2019–present
- Indiv. starts: 86
- Indiv. podiums: 37
- Indiv. wins: 13
- Team starts: 3
- Team podiums: 1
- Team wins: 0
- Overall titles: 1 (2023)
- Discipline titles: 0
Medal record
Men's Nordic combined
Representing Austria
Olympic Games
Silver medal – second place	2026 Milano Cortina	Individual NH
Silver medal – second place	2026 Milano Cortina	Individual LH
Bronze medal – third place	2026 Milano Cortina	Team LH
World Championships
Gold medal – first place	2021 Oberstdorf	Individual LH
Gold medal – first place	2021 Oberstdorf	Team sprint
Silver medal – second place	2025 Trondheim	Team LH
Bronze medal – third place	2021 Oberstdorf	Team NH
Bronze medal – third place	2023 Planica	Individual LH
Bronze medal – third place	2023 Planica	Team LH
Bronze medal – third place	2023 Planica	Mixed team
Bronze medal – third place	2025 Trondheim	Mixed team
- Updated on 19 February 2026

Johannes Lamparter (born 8 November 2001) is an Austrian Nordic combined skier. He is a three-time Winter Olympic medalist and two-time World Championships gold medalist.

His breakthrough season was 2020–21 FIS Nordic Combined World Cup, when he achieved two podium results in World Cup competition. But he made even more spectacular results on FIS Nordic World Ski Championships 2021. Lamparter won two gold medals, one in individual large hill Gundersen and second in team sprint. He also took bronze medal in relay. Also in 2021, he became world junior champion, in Lahti.

== Nordic combined results ==
- All results are sourced from FIS.

=== Olympic Games ===
- 3 medals – (2 silver, 1 bronze)

Year	Individual NH	Individual LH	Team LH
2022	4	6	4
2026	Silver	Silver	Bronze

=== World Championships ===
Year	Individual NH	Individual LH	Team NH / LH	Mixed team	Team sprint LH
2021	7	Gold	Bronze	—	Gold
2023	11	Bronze	Bronze	Bronze	—
2025	4	5	Silver	Bronze	—
