= Jenny Nowak =

German Nordic combined skier and ski jumper

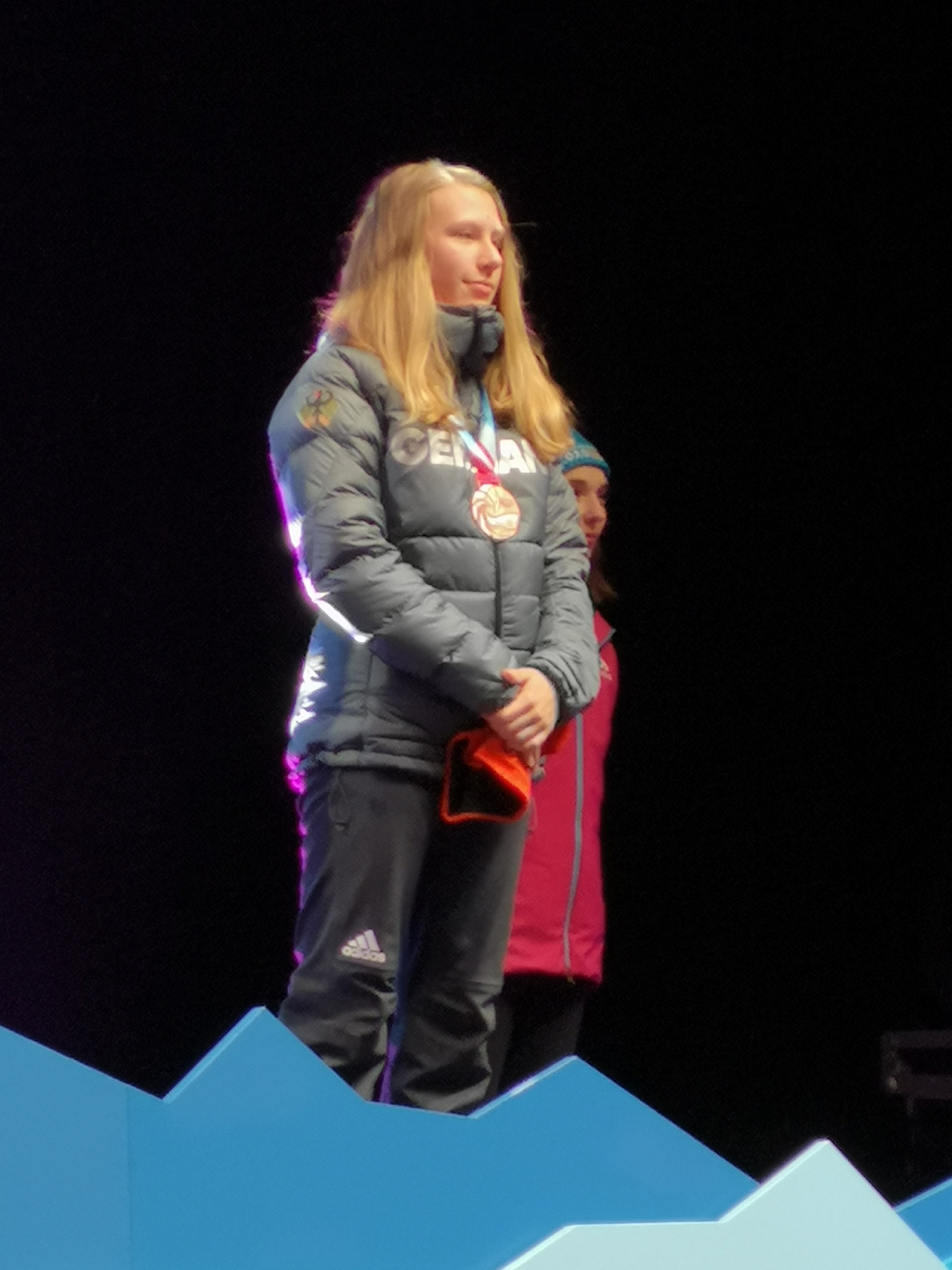

Personal information
- Nationality: Germany
- Born: 20 August 2002 (age 24)
- Height: 1.67 m (5 ft 6 in)

Sport
- Sport: Skiing
- Club: SC Sohland

World Cup career
- Seasons: 2021–present
- Indiv. starts: 30
Medal record
Representing Germany
Women's Nordic combined
World Championships
Silver medal – second place	2023 Planica	Mixed team
Silver medal – second place	2025 Trondheim	Mixed team
World Junior Championships
Gold medal – first place	2020 Oberwiesenthal	Individual NH
Gold medal – first place	2022 Zakopane	Mixed team NH
Silver medal – second place	2020 Oberwiesenthal	Mixed team NH
Youth Olympic Games
Bronze medal – third place	2020 Lausanne	Individual NH
Women's ski jumping
World Junior Championships
Silver medal – second place	2019 Lahti	Team NH

Jenny Nowak (born 20 August 2002) is a German Nordic combined skier and former ski jumper.

She has won two silver medals in the mixed team event at the FIS Nordic World Ski Championships.

== Nordic combined results ==
=== World Championships ===
Year	Normal hill	Mass start	Mixed team
2021	18	—N/a	—N/a
2023	11	—N/a	Silver
2025	5	5	Silver
