= Tehvandi Sports Center =

Complex of sports facilities in Otepää, Estonia

- Tehvandi Spordikeskus
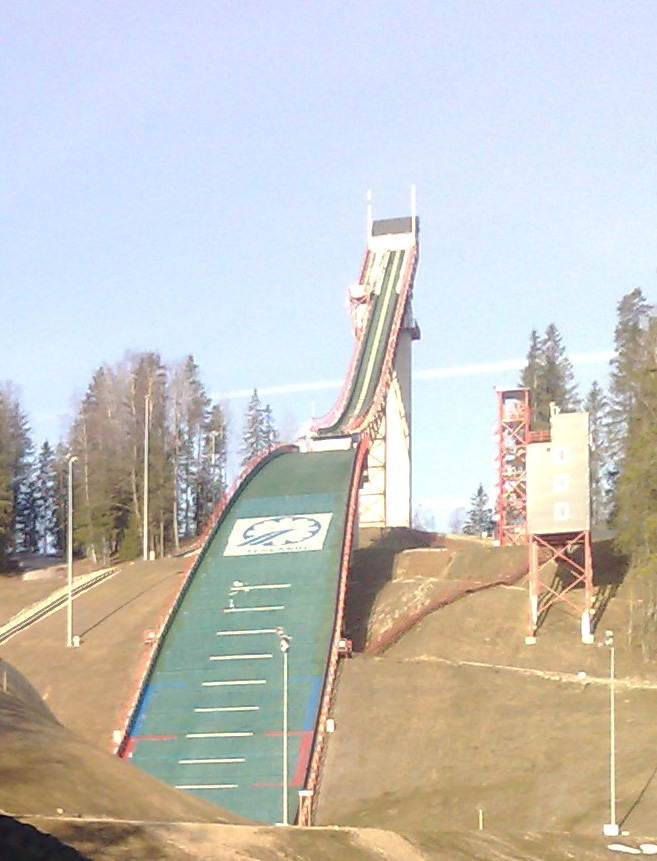
- Tehvandi ski jumping hill
- Interactive map of Tehvandi Sports Center
- Address: Ranna tee, Otepää, Nüpli, 67408, Estonia
- Location: Otepää Parish, Estonia
- Coordinates: 58°03′03″N 26°30′33″E

Website
- www.tehvandi.ee/en

Tehvandi Sports Center (Estonian: Tehvandi Spordikeskus) is a complex of sports facilities in Otepää Parish, Estonia.

It includes multi-purpose stadium (athletics and football), ski stadium, ski jumping hill K90 and biathlon shooting ranges.

== History ==
It has been a site for FIS Cross-Country World Cup 15 times, first held in 1999 and most recently in the 2018–19 season.

In 2011, it held the Nordic Junior World Ski Championships.

It was scheduled to become a site for the Nordic combined World Cup event in the 2017–18 season, but was cancelled due to lack of snow and warm temperatures. It successfully hosted the event in the next season.

In 2018, it held the Biathlon Junior World Championships.

In March 2022, it hosted the Biathlon World Cup event for the first time.

2027 Biathlon World Championships will be held in Otepää.

== Gallery ==
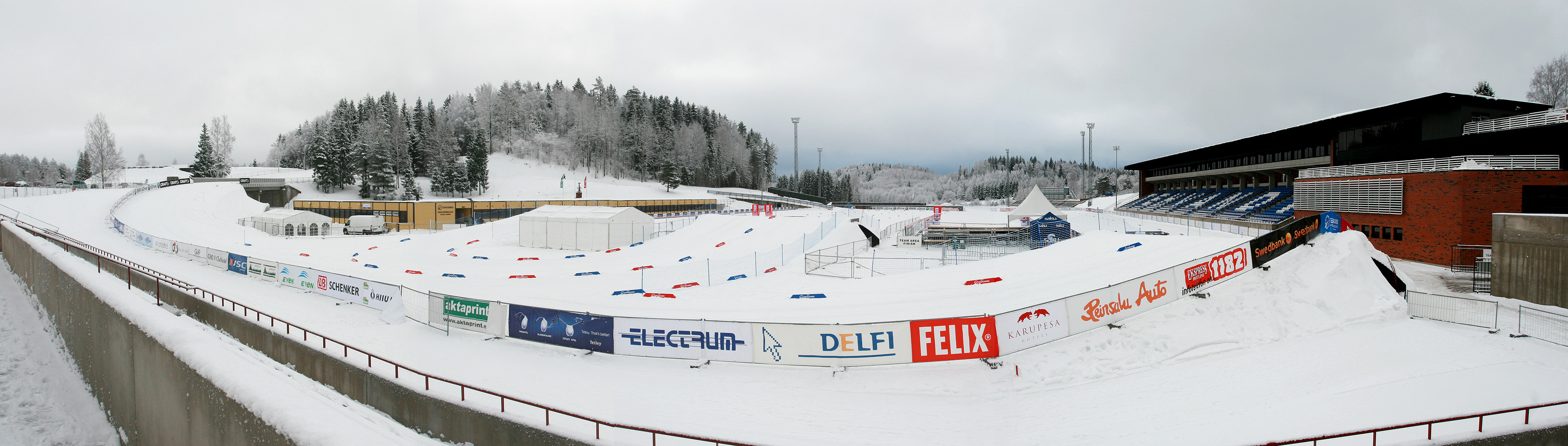
Tehvandi ski stadium in 2011

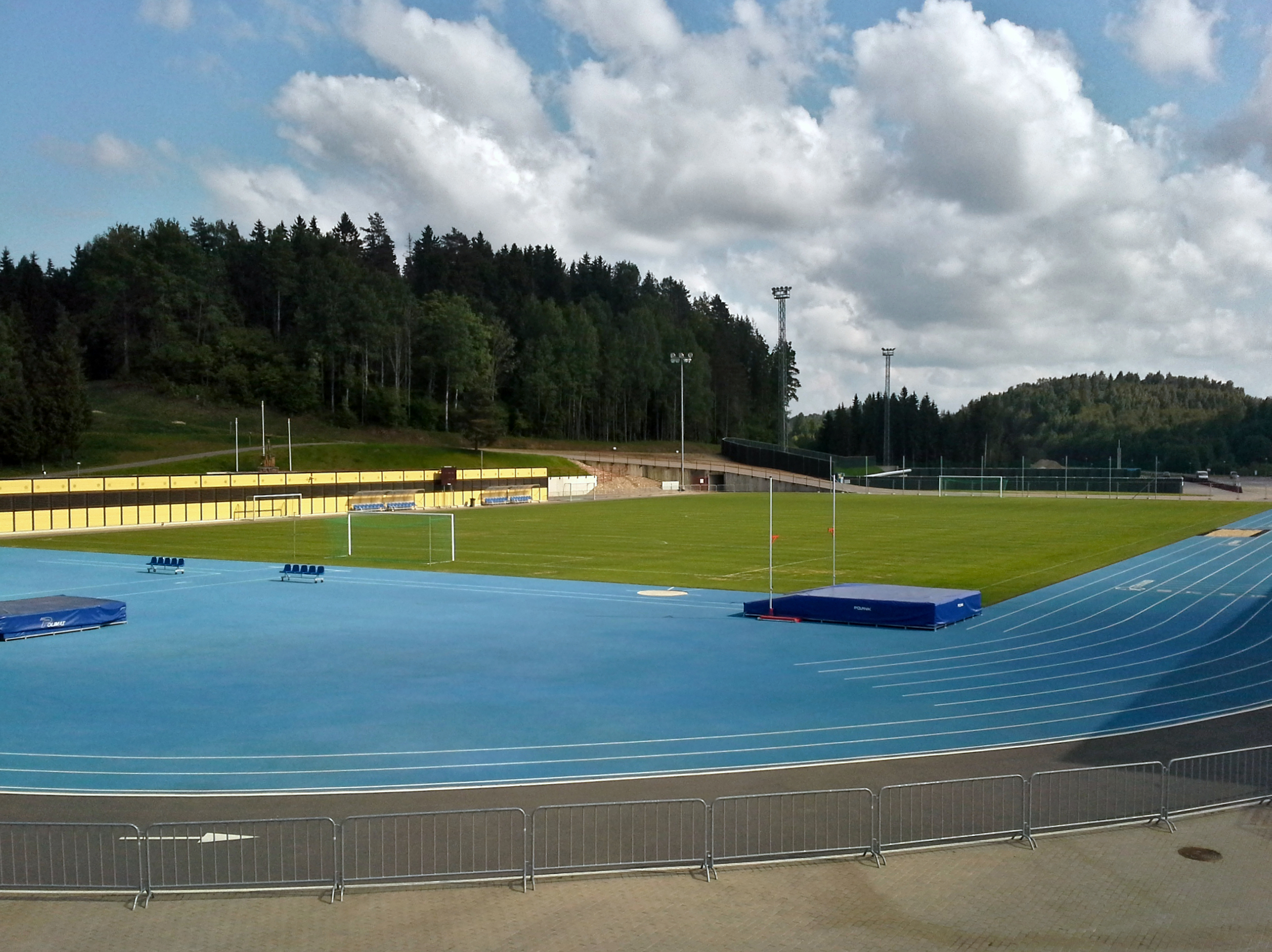
Tehvandi stadium in May 2013

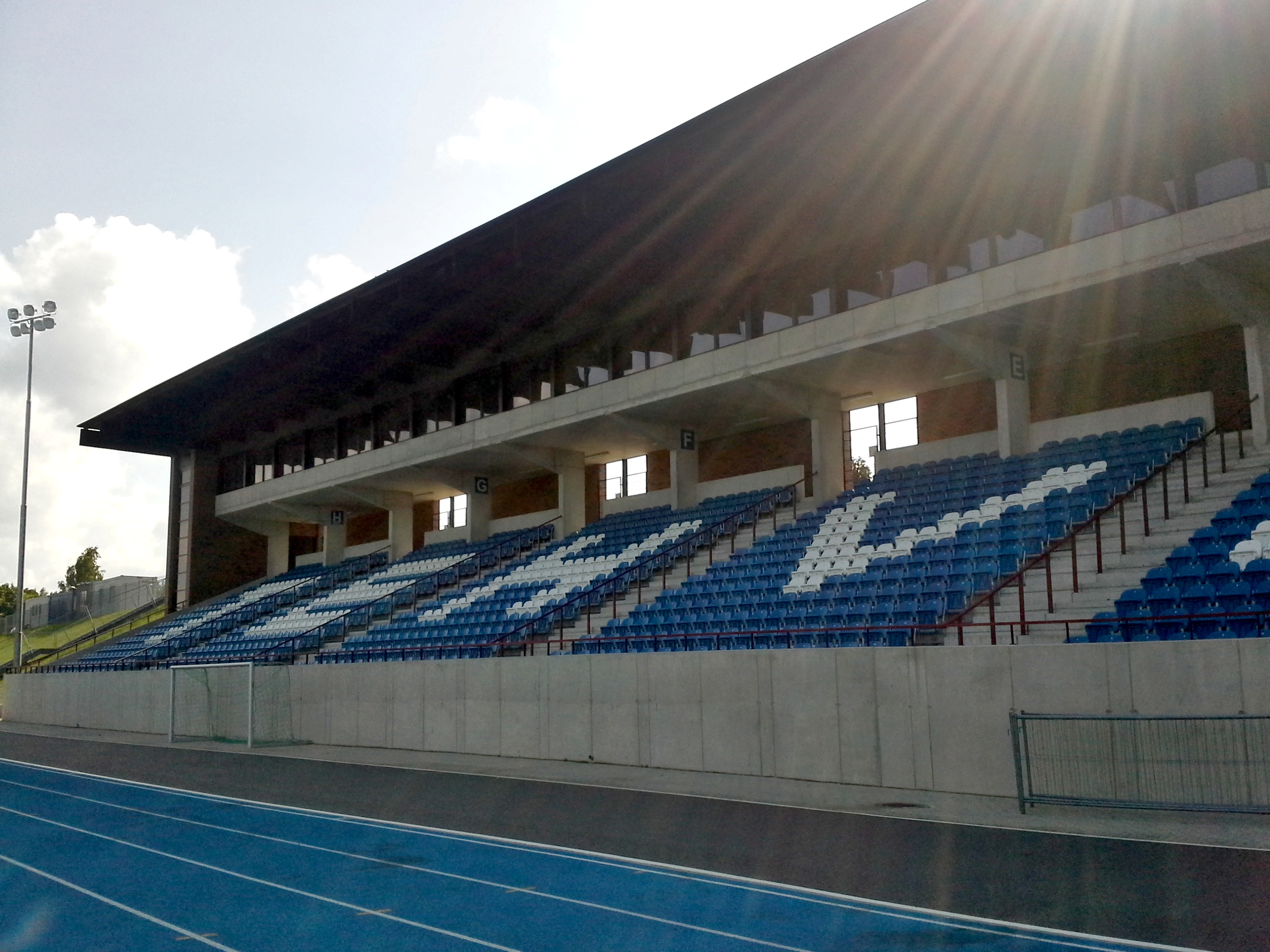
Tehvandi stadium in May 2013

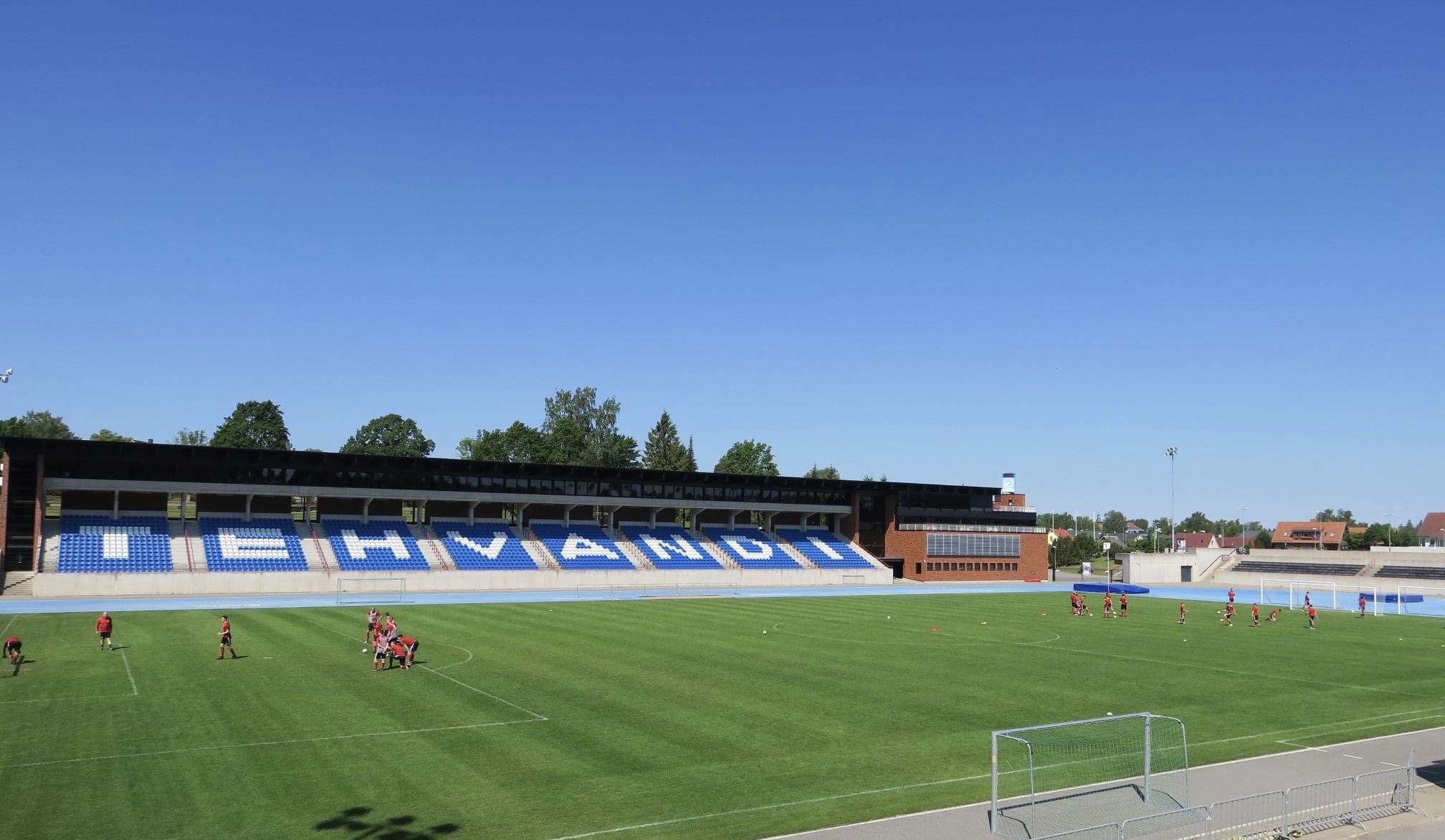
Tehvandi stadium in June 2019
