= Cross-country skiing at the 2023 Winter World University Games – Mixed team sprint =

Mixed team sprint at the Lake Placid 2023 FISU World University Games
- Cross-country skiing
- Venue: Lake Placid Olympic Sports Complex Cross Country Biathlon Center
- Date: 13 January 2023
- Competitors: 74 from 21 nations
- Teams: 37
- Winning time: 20:42.85

Medalists
1st place, gold medalist(s)		Hirose Ryo; Sobue Rin	Japan
2nd place, silver medalist(s)		Finn Sweet; Renae Anderson	United States
3rd place, bronze medalist(s)		Andreas Kirkeng; Karianne Olsvik Dengerud	Norway

The mixed team sprint competition in cross-country skiing at the 2023 Winter World University Games was held on 13 January 2023, at the Lake Placid Olympic Sports Complex Cross Country Biathlon Center.

== Results ==
=== Semifinals ===
Rank	Heat	Bib	Country	Athletes	Time	Notes
1	1	5	Finland 1	Verneri Poikonen; Hilla Niemelä	20:15.81	Q
2	1	3	Norway 1	Andreas Kirkeng; Karianne Olsvik Dengerud	20:17.09	Q
3	1	6	Poland 1	Mateusz Haratyk; Weronika Kaleta	20:18.17	q
4	1	1	Japan 1	Ryo Hirose; Rin Sobue	20:18.49	q
5	1	4	Germany 1	Marius Bauer; Anna-Maria Dietze	20:19.68	q
6	1	12	United States 2	Finn Sweet; Renae Anderson	20:27.43	q
7	1	11	France 1	Tom Mancini; Amelie Suiffet	20:34.73	q
8	1	2	Czech Republic 1	Tomáš Dufek; Barbora Antošová	20:36.80	q
9	1	8	France 2	Matteo Correia; Tania Kurek	21:09.01	
10	1	7	Japan 2	Shota Moriguchi; Nodoka Tochitani	21:32.64	
11	1	15	Switzerland 1	Gianluca Wenger; Malia Elmer	21:37.59	
12	1	9	Spain	Jaume Pueyo; Maria Iglesias	21:38.23	
13	1	13	Switzerland 2	Maxime Beguin; Clara Wöhler	21:38.55	
14	1	16	Ukraine 1	Maksym Bondar; Anastasiya Nikon	21:49.31	
15	1	17	Canada 2	Alexander Maycock; Katherine Mason	23:11.83	
16	1	14	South Korea 2	Lee Jin-bok; Kim Ga-eul	24:12.06	
17	1	10	South Korea 1	Kim Jin-hyeong; Moon So-youn	24:16.50	
18	1	19	Mongolia	Zolbayar Otgonlkhagva; Nomin-Erdene Barsnyam	25:13.79	
	1	18	Thailand	Sarawut Koedsin; Nawaphorn Phormwong	DNF	
1	2	29	Italy 1	Luca Compagnoni; Maria Eugenia Boccardi	21:01.02	Q
2	2	30	Finland 2	Juha Nurmi; Tiia Olkkonen	21:04.79	Q
3	2	20	Czech Republic 2	Kryštof Zatloukal; Adéla Nováková	21:05.74	
4	2	23	United States 1	Will Koch; Kendall Kramer	21:06.48	
5	2	21	Kazakhstan 2	Ivan Lyuft; Xeniya Shalygina	21:07.77	
6	2	25	Estonia	Christopher Kalev; Mariel Pulles	21:17.35	
7	2	27	Germany 2	Philipp Moosmayer; Celine Mayer	21:19.57	
8	2	22	Norway 2	Magnus Bøe; Henriette Sæterdal Semb	22:05.13	
9	2	31	Italy 2	Riccardo Munari; Laura Colombo	22:10.31	
10	2	34	Slovakia 1	Jáchym Cenek; Kristina Sivoková	22:13.19	
11	2	28	Australia 1	Seve de Campo; Rosie Fordham	22:13.89	
12	2	24	Kazakhstan 1	Svyatoslav Matassov; Anna Melnik	22:30.14	
13	2	26	Poland 2	Michał Skowron; Karolina Kukuczka	22:31.85	
14	2	35	Canada 1	Conor McGovern; Sophie Tremblay	22:36.25	
15	2	33	Ukraine 2	Dmytro Romanchenko; Anastasiya Ivanchenko	22:53.28	
16	2	37	Slovakia 2	Jan Mikus; Marianna Klementová	22:54.97	
17	2	32	Iceland	Dagur Benediktsson; Gígja Björnsdóttir	24:24.80	
18	2	36	Australia 2	Adam Barnett; Hannah Price	24:43.60	

=== Final ===
Rank	Bib	Country	Athletes	Time	Deficit
1st place, gold medalist(s)	1	Japan 1	Hirose Ryo; Sobue Rin	20:42.85	
2nd place, silver medalist(s)	12	United States 2	Finn Sweet; Renae Anderson	20:51.87	+9.02
3rd place, bronze medalist(s)	3	Norway 1	Andreas Kirkeng; Karianne Olsvik Dengerud	20:55.61	+12.76
4	6	Poland 1	Mateusz Haratyk; Weronika Kaleta	20:56.06	+13.21
5	30	Finland 2	Juha Nurmi; Tiia Olkkonen	21:01.83	+18.98
6	29	Italy 1	Luca Compagnoni; Maria Eugenia Boccardi	21:09.21	+26.36
7	5	Finland 1	Verneri Poikonen; Hilla Niemelä	21:19.09	+36.24
8	4	Germany 1	Marius Bauer; Anna-Maria Dietze	21:23.35	+40.50
9	11	France 1	Tom Mancini; Amelie Suiffet	21:31.90	+49.05
10	2	Czech Republic 1	Tomáš Dufek; Barbora Antošová	21:56.95	+1:14.10
