= Nordic combined at the 2023 Winter World University Games – Women's individual normal hill/5 km =

Women's individual normal hill/5 km at the Lake Placid 2023 FISU World University Games
- Nordic combined
- Venue: Lake Placid Olympic Ski Jumping Complex (ski jumping); Lake Placid Olympic Sports Complex Cross Country Biathlon Center (cross-country skiing)
- Date: 13 February
- Competitors: 6 from 3 nations
- Winning time: 14:34.6

Medalists
1st place, gold medalist(s)		Haruka Kasai	Japan
2nd place, silver medalist(s)		Yuna Kasai	Japan
3rd place, bronze medalist(s)		Ayane Miyazaki	Japan

The women's individual normal hill/5 km competition in Nordic combined at the 2023 Winter World University Games was held on 13 January, at the Lake Placid Olympic Ski Jumping Complex and Lake Placid Olympic Sports Complex Cross Country Biathlon Center.

== Results ==
=== Ski jumping ===
The ski jumping part will be held at 14:00.

Rank	Bib	Name	Country	Distance (m)	Points	Time difference
1	5	Haruka Kasai	Japan	86.0	114.0	
2	6	Yuna Kasai	Japan	80.0	100.5	+0:54
3	2	Ayane Miyazaki	Japan	88.0	97.9	+1:04
4	3	Joanna Kil	Poland	78.0	83.6	+2:02
5	4	Sana Azegami	Japan	75.0	80.2	+2:15
6	1	Tess Arnone	United States	57.5	36.3	+5:11

=== Cross-country ===
The cross-country part will be held at 18:45.

Rank	Bib	Name	Country	Start time	Cross-country		Finish time	Deficit
Rank	Bib	Name	Country	Start time	Time	Rank	Finish time	Deficit
1st place, gold medalist(s)	1	Haruka Kasai	Japan	0:00	14:34.6	2	14:34.6	
2nd place, silver medalist(s)	2	Yuna Kasai	Japan	0:54	14:29.4	1	15:23.4	+48.8
3rd place, bronze medalist(s)	3	Ayane Miyazaki	Japan	1:04	15:20.5	4	16:24.5	+2:07.9
4	4	Joanna Kil	Poland	2:02	14:44.7	3	16:46.7	+2:12.1
5	6	Tess Arnone	United States	5:11	16:09.7	5	21:20.7	+6:46.1
	5	Sana Azegami	Japan	2:15	DNS			
