= 2022–23 FIS Nordic Combined World Cup =

40th Nordic Combined World Cup season

Nordic Combined World Cup 2022/23
Discipline	Men	Women
Overall	(Austria) Johannes Lamparter (1)	(Norway) Gyda Westvold Hansen (2)
Nations Cup	Germany (14)	Norway (3)
Best Jumper Trophy	(Japan) Ryōta Yamamoto (1)	(Norway) Gyda Westvold Hansen (3)
Best Skier Trophy	(Norway) Jens Lurås Oftebro (1)	(Norway) Ida Marie Hagen (1)

Stage events
Ruka Tour	(Germany) Julian Schmid (1)	—
Triple	(Austria) Johannes Lamparter (1)	—
German Trophy	(Austria) Johannes Lamparter (1)	—

Competition
Edition	40th	3rd
Locations	10	6
Individual	22	10
Team	1	—
Mixed	1	1
Cancelled	2	1
Rescheduled	1	

The 2022/23 FIS Nordic Combined World Cup, organized by the International Ski Federation was the 40th Nordic Combined World Cup season for men, and the 3rd season for women. The men's competition started in Ruka, Finland and concluded in Lahti, Finland. The women's competition started in Lillehammer, Norway and concluded in Oslo, Norway.

Norwegians Jarl Magnus Riiber and Gyda Westvold Hansen were the defending overall champions from the 2021–22 season.

== Map of world cup hosts ==
All 11 locations hosting world cup events for men (11), for women (6) and shared (6) in this season.

Europe

Ruka Tour (Men) Triple (Men) Men Only Shared

== Men ==
World Cup history in real time

Total	GUL	GUN	MSS	GU	Sp	Pen	Hsp	Csp	Winners
592	143	94	23	239	86	4	2	1	76

after GUL event in Lahti (26 March 2023)

=== Calendar ===
GUN – Gundersen / MSS – Mass Start
All	#	Date	Place (Hill)	Discipline	Winner	Second	Third	R.
571	1	25 November 2022	(Finland) Ruka (Rukatunturi HS142)	5 km GUN _{134}	(Germany) Julian Schmid	(Japan) Ryōta Yamamoto	(Norway) Jens Lurås Oftebro	
572	2	26 November 2022	(Finland) Ruka (Rukatunturi HS142)	10 km GUN _{135}	(Norway) Jarl Magnus Riiber	(Germany) Julian Schmid	(Norway) Jens Lurås Oftebro	
573	3	27 November 2022	(Finland) Ruka (Rukatunturi HS142)	10 km MSS _{021}	(Norway) Jarl Magnus Riiber	(France) Matteo Baud	(Japan) Ryōta Yamamoto	
5th Ruka Tour (24 – 27 November 2022)					(Germany) Julian Schmid	(Norway) Jarl Magnus Riiber	(Japan) Ryōta Yamamoto	
574	4	3 December 2022	(Norway) Lillehammer (Lysgårdsbakken HS98/HS140)	10 km GUN _{086}	(Norway) Jens Lurås Oftebro	(Norway) Jarl Magnus Riiber	(Germany) Vinzenz Geiger	
575	5	4 December 2022	(Norway) Lillehammer (Lysgårdsbakken HS98/HS140)	10 km GUN _{136}	(Norway) Jarl Magnus Riiber	(Norway) Jens Lurås Oftebro	(Germany) Vinzenz Geiger	
576	6	16 December 2022	(Austria) Ramsau (W90-Mattensprunganlage HS98)	10 km GUN _{087}	(Norway) Jarl Magnus Riiber	(Norway) Jens Lurås Oftebro	(Germany) Vinzenz Geiger	
577	7	17 December 2022	(Austria) Ramsau (W90-Mattensprunganlage HS98)	10 km GUN _{088}	(Germany) Vinzenz Geiger	(Austria) Johannes Lamparter	(Norway) Jarl Magnus Riiber	
578	8	7 January 2023	(Estonia) Otepää (Tehvandi HS97)	10 km MSS _{022}	(Austria) Johannes Lamparter	(Finland) Ilkka Herola	(Austria) Thomas Rettenegger	
579	9	8 January 2023	(Estonia) Otepää (Tehvandi HS97)	10 km GUN _{089}	(Germany) Julian Schmid	(Austria) Johannes Lamparter	(Austria) Franz-Josef Rehrl	
580	10	21 January 2023	(Germany) Klingenthal (Vogtland Arena HS140)	10 km MSS _{023}	(Austria) Johannes Lamparter	(Austria) Franz-Josef Rehrl	(Norway) Jarl Magnus Riiber	
581	11	22 January 2023	(Germany) Klingenthal (Vogtland Arena HS140)	10 km GUN _{137}	(Austria) Johannes Lamparter	(Norway) Jarl Magnus Riiber	(Austria) Franz-Josef Rehrl	
		21 January 2023	(France) Chaux-Neuve (La Côte Feuillée)	cancelled due to lack of snow				
		22 January 2023	(France) Chaux-Neuve (La Côte Feuillée)	cancelled due to lack of snow				
582	12	27 January 2023	(Austria) Seefeld (Toni-Seelos-Olympiaschanze HS109)	7.5 km GUN _{090}	(Norway) Jens Lurås Oftebro	(Austria) Johannes Lamparter	(Germany) Julian Schmid	
583	13	28 January 2023	(Austria) Seefeld (Toni-Seelos-Olympiaschanze HS109)	10 km GUN _{091}	(Austria) Johannes Lamparter	(Germany) Vinzenz Geiger	(Germany) Julian Schmid	
584	14	29 January 2023	(Austria) Seefeld (Toni-Seelos-Olympiaschanze HS109)	12.5 km GUN _{092}	(Austria) Johannes Lamparter	(Germany) Julian Schmid	(Norway) Jens Lurås Oftebro	
10th Nordic Combined Triple (27 – 29 January 2023)
585	15	4 February 2023	(Germany) Oberstdorf (Schattenbergschanze HS137)	10 km GUN _{138}	(Austria) Johannes Lamparter	(Norway) Jens Lurås Oftebro	(Austria) Franz-Josef Rehrl	
586	16	5 February 2023	(Germany) Oberstdorf (Schattenbergschanze HS137)	10 km GUN _{139}	(Germany) Julian Schmid	(Norway) Jens Lurås Oftebro	(Austria) Franz-Josef Rehrl	
587	17	11 February 2023	(Germany) Schonach (Langenwaldschanze HS100)	10 km GUN _{093}	(Norway) Jens Lurås Oftebro	(Austria) Johannes Lamparter	(Estonia) Kristjan Ilves	
588	18	12 February 2023	(Germany) Schonach (Langenwaldschanze HS100)	10 km GUN _{094}	(Austria) Johannes Lamparter	(Norway) Jens Lurås Oftebro	(France) Laurent Muhlethaler	
1st German Trophy (21 January – 12 February 2023)					(Austria) Johannes Lamparter	(Germany) Julian Schmid	(Norway) Jens Lurås Oftebro	
FIS Nordic World Ski Championships 2023 (22 February – 5 March) (Note: not included in the World Cup)
WCH		25 February 2023	(Slovenia) Planica (Srednja Bloudkova) / Bloudkova velikanka) HS102/138)	10 km GUN	(Norway) Jarl Magnus Riiber	(Germany) Julian Schmid	(Austria) Franz-Josef Rehrl	
WCH		4 March 2023	(Slovenia) Planica (Srednja Bloudkova) / Bloudkova velikanka) HS102/138)	10 km GUN	(Norway) Jarl Magnus Riiber	(Norway) Jens Lurås Oftebro	(Austria) Johannes Lamparter	
589	19	11 March 2023	(Norway) Oslo (Holmenkollbakken HS134)	10 km GUN _{140}	(Norway) Jarl Magnus Riiber	(Germany) Julian Schmid	(Austria) Johannes Lamparter	
590	20	12 March 2023	(Norway) Oslo (Holmenkollbakken HS134)	10 km GUN _{141}	(Norway) Jarl Magnus Riiber	(Germany) Vinzenz Geiger	(Germany) Julian Schmid	
591	21	25 March 2023	(Finland) Lahti (Salpausselkä HS130)	10 km GUN _{142}	(Norway) Jarl Magnus Riiber	(Estonia) Kristjan Ilves	(Norway) Jens Lurås Oftebro	
592	22	26 March 2023	(Finland) Lahti (Salpausselkä HS130)	10 km GUN _{143}	(Norway) Jarl Magnus Riiber	(Norway) Jens Lurås Oftebro	(Estonia) Kristjan Ilves	

=== Men's team ===
World Cup history in real time

Total	Relay	Sprint	Mass Start	Winners
49	25	22	2	5

after Sprint in Lahti (24 March 2023)

Num	Season	Date	Place	Hill	Discipline	Winner	Second	Third	Yellow bib	Ref.
FIS Nordic World Ski Championships 2023 (22 February – 5 March)
World Championships
World Championships		1 March 2023	(Slovenia) Planica	Bloudkova velikanka	HS138 / 4x5 km Relay	Norway Espen Andersen; Jens Lurås Oftebro; Jørgen Graabak; Jarl Magnus Riiber	Germany Eric Frenzel; Vinzenz Geiger; Johannes Rydzek; Julian Schmid	Austria Martin Fritz; Lukas Greiderer; Stefan Rettenegger; Johannes Lamparter	not included in the World Cup	
49	1	24 March 2023	(Finland) Lahti	Salpausselkä	HS130 / 2x7.5 km Sprint _{022}	Germany Julian Schmid; Vinzenz Geiger	Norway Jørgen Graabak; Jarl Magnus Riiber	France Matteo Baud; Laurent Muhlethaler	Germany	

=== Overall leaders ===
==== Individual ====
No.	Holder	Date gained	Place	Date forfeited	Place	Number of competitions
1.	(Germany) Julian Schmid	25 November 2022	(Finland) Ruka	3 December 2022	(Norway) Lillehammer	3
2.	(Norway) Jarl Magnus Riiber	3 December 2022	(Norway) Lillehammer	29 January 2023	(Austria) Seefeld	10
3.	(Austria) Johannes Lamparter	29 January 2023	(Austria) Seefeld	Overall Winner		9

=== Standings ===
==== Overall ====
Rank	after all 22 events	Points
	(Austria) Johannes Lamparter	1367
2	(Norway) Jens Lurås Oftebro	1313
3	(Germany) Julian Schmid	1217
4	(Norway) Jarl Magnus Riiber	1123
5	(Estonia) Kristjan Ilves	753
6	(Austria) Franz-Josef Rehrl	704
7	(Germany) Vinzenz Geiger	693
8	(France) Laurent Muhlethaler	592
9	(Finland) Ilkka Herola	583
10	(Germany) Manuel Faißt	548

==== Nations Cup ====
Rank	after all 24 events	Points
	Germany	4295
2	Norway	4168
3	Austria	4053
4	France	1393
5	Finland	1247
6	Japan	1056
7	Estonia	753
8	Italy	435
9	United States	87
10	Slovenia	67

==== German Trophy ====
Rank	after all 6 events	Time
1	(Austria) Johannes Lamparter	2:02:06
2	(Germany) Julian Schmid	+3:16
3	(Norway) Jens Lurås Oftebro	+4:23
4	(Estonia) Kristjan Ilves	+4:38
5	(Finland) Ilkka Herola	+7:09
6	(Austria) Mario Seidl	+7:10
7	(France) Laurent Muhlethaler	+7:57
8	(Austria) Martin Fritz	+10:42
9	(Austria) Lukas Greiderer	+11.19
10	(Germany) Jakob Lange	+12:26

==== Best Jumper Trophy ====
Rank	after all 22 events	Points
Blue bib	(Japan) Ryōta Yamamoto	1308
2	(Austria) Franz-Josef Rehrl	1186
3	(Norway) Jarl Magnus Riiber	1063
4	(Austria) Johannes Lamparter	1015
5	(Germany) Julian Schmid	889
6	(Norway) Jens Lurås Oftebro	801
7	(Estonia) Kristjan Ilves	790
8	(Austria) Mario Seidl	701
9	(France) Laurent Muhlethaler	679
10	(Japan) Yoshito Watabe	559

==== Best Skier Trophy ====
Rank	after all 22 events	Points
Red bib	(Norway) Jens Lurås Oftebro	1397
2	(Germany) Vinzenz Geiger	933
3	(Germany) Fabian Rießle	896
4	(Finland) Ilkka Herola	768
5	(Finland) Eero Hirvonen	766
6	(Germany) Jakob Lange	757
7	(Austria) Johannes Lamparter	736
8	(Germany) Johannes Rydzek	648
9	(Norway) Einar Lurås Oftebro	616
10	(Norway) Jørgen Graabak	599

==== Prize money ====
Rank	after all 29 payouts	CHF
1	(Austria) Johannes Lamparter	132 546
2	(Norway) Jens Lurås Oftebro	117 206
3	(Germany) Julian Schmid	107 950
4	(Norway) Jarl Magnus Riiber	101 402
5	(Germany) Vinzenz Geiger	49 305
6	(Austria) Franz-Josef Rehrl	41 278
7	(Estonia) Kristjan Ilves	38 502
8	(Japan) Ryōta Yamamoto	32 100
9	(Norway) Jørgen Graabak	29 232
10	(France) Laurent Muhlethaler	27 492

== Women ==
World Cup history in real time

Total	Gundersen	MSS	Winners
19	17	2	3

after GUN event in Oslo (11 March 2023)

=== Calendar ===
GUN – Gundersen / MSS – Mass Start
All	#	Date	Place (Hill)	Discipline	Winner	Second	Third	R.
10	1	2 December 2022	(Norway) Lillehammer (Lysgårdsbakken HS98)	5 km GUN _{008}	(Norway) Gyda Westvold Hansen	(Italy) Annika Sieff	(Germany) Nathalie Armbruster	
11	2	3 December 2022	(Norway) Lillehammer (Lysgårdsbakken HS98)	5 km GUN _{009}	(Norway) Gyda Westvold Hansen	(Norway) Ida Marie Hagen	(Austria) Lisa Hirner	
12	3	16 December 2022	(Austria) Ramsau (W90-Mattensprunganlage HS98)	5 km GUN _{010}	(Norway) Gyda Westvold Hansen	(Austria) Lisa Hirner	(Germany) Nathalie Armbruster	
13	4	17 December 2022	(Austria) Ramsau (W90-Mattensprunganlage HS98)	5 km GUN _{011}	(Norway) Gyda Westvold Hansen	(Italy) Annika Sieff	(Germany) Nathalie Armbruster	
		7 January 2023	(Estonia) Otepää (Tehvandi HS97)	5 km MSS	Cancelled due to strong wind.			
14	5	8 January 2023	(Estonia) Otepää (Tehvandi HS97)	HS97 / 5 km _{012}	(Norway) Gyda Westvold Hansen	(Germany) Nathalie Armbruster	(Austria) Lisa Hirner	
15	6	27 January 2023	(Austria) Seefeld (Toni-Seelos-Olympiaschanze HS109)	5 km GUN _{013}	(Norway) Gyda Westvold Hansen	(Germany) Nathalie Armbruster	(Norway) Ida Marie Hagen	
16	7	28 January 2023	(Austria) Seefeld (Toni-Seelos-Olympiaschanze HS109)	5 km GUN _{014}	(Norway) Gyda Westvold Hansen	(Italy) Annika Sieff	(Germany) Nathalie Armbruster	
17	8	11 February 2023	(Germany) Schonach (Langenwaldschanze HS100)	5 km GUN _{015}	(Norway) Gyda Westvold Hansen	(Germany) Jenny Nowak	(Japan) Yuna Kasai	
18	9	12 February 2023	(Germany) Schonach (Langenwaldschanze HS100)	5 km GUN _{016}	(Norway) Gyda Westvold Hansen	(Norway) Ida Marie Hagen	(Germany) Nathalie Armbruster	
FIS Nordic World Ski Championships 2023 (22 February – 5 March)
WCH		24 February 2023	(Slovenia) Planica (Srednja Bloudkova) HS102)	5 km GUN	(Norway) Gyda Westvold Hansen	(Germany) Nathalie Armbruster	(Japan) Haruka Kasai	
19	10	(Note: 9 March Ski Jumping part, 11 March 5km race.)9+11 March 2023	(Norway) Oslo (Midtstubakken HS106)	5 km GUN _{017}	(Norway) Gyda Westvold Hansen	(Norway) Ida Marie Hagen	(Japan) Anju Nakamura	

=== Overall leaders ===
==== Individual ====
No.	Holder	Date gained	Place	Date forfeited	Place	Number of competitions
1.	(Norway) Gyda Westvold Hansen	2 December 2022	(Norway) Lillehammer	Overall Winner		10

=== Standings ===
==== Overall ====
Rank	after all 10 events	Points
	(Norway) Gyda Westvold Hansen	1000
2	(Germany) Nathalie Armbruster	589
3	(Norway) Ida Marie Hagen	542
4	(Italy) Annika Sieff	541
5	(Austria) Lisa Hirner	454
6	(Japan) Yuna Kasai	398
7	(Japan) Haruka Kasai	330
8	(Germany) Jenny Nowak	325
9	(Japan) Anju Nakamura	269
10	(France) Lena Brocard	239

==== Nations Cup ====
Rank	after all 11 events	Points
	Norway	2209
2	Germany	1750
3	Japan	1201
4	Italy	897
5	Austria	887
6	Slovenia	336
7	Finland	239
8	France	239
9	United States	125
10	Czech Republic	50

==== Best Jumper Trophy ====
Rank	after all 10 events	Points
Blue bib	(Norway) Gyda Westvold Hansen	980
2	(Italy) Annika Sieff	690
3	(Germany) Nathalie Armbruster	538
4	(Austria) Lisa Hirner	437
5	(Japan) Yuna Kasai	402
6	(Germany) Svenja Würth	372
7	(Germany) Jenny Nowak	369
8	(Japan) Haruka Kasai	331
9	(Austria) Annalena Slamik	298
10	(Norway) Ida Marie Hagen	263

==== Best Skier Trophy ====
Rank	after all 10 events	Points
Red bib	(Norway) Ida Marie Hagen	1000
2	(Norway) Marte Leinan Lund	601
3	(Norway) Gyda Westvold Hansen	535
4	(Japan) Anju Nakamura	447
5	(Germany) Nathalie Armbruster	394
6	(Japan) Haruka Kasai	352
7	(Slovenia) Ema Volavšek	326
8	(Austria) Lisa Hirner	311
9	(Italy) Veronica Gianmoena	281
10	(France) Lena Brocard	269

==== Prize money ====
Rank	after all 14 payouts	CHF
1	(Norway) Gyda Westvold Hansen	52 400
2	(Norway) Ida Marie Hagen	20 350
3	(Germany) Nathalie Armbruster	19 180
4	(Italy) Annika Sieff	13 365
5	(Austria) Lisa Hirner	11 000
6	(Germany) Jenny Nowak	9 680
7	(Japan) Yuna Kasai	7 095
8	(Japan) Haruka Kasai	5 555
9	(Japan) Anju Nakamura	4 345
10	(Slovenia) Ema Volavšek	3 905

== Mixed team ==
World Cup history in real time

Total	Relay	Winners
2	2	1

after Relay event in Otepää (6 January 2023)

Num	Season	Date	Place	Hill	Discipline	Winner	Second	Third	Yellow bib	Ref.
2	1	6 January 2023	(Estonia) Otepää	Tehvandi	HS97/ 2x2.5 km + 2x5 km Relay _{002}	Norway Jens Lurås Oftebro; Ida Marie Hagen; Gyda Westvold Hansen; Jørgen Graabak	Germany Manuel Faißt; Jenny Nowak; Nathalie Armbruster; Julian Schmid	Austria Franz-Josef Rehrl; Lisa Hirner; Annalena Slamik; Lukas Greiderer	Norway (men) & (women)	
FIS Nordic World Ski Championships 2023 (22 February – 5 March)
World Championships		26 February 2023	(Slovenia) Planica	Srednja Bloudkova	HS102 / 4x5 km Relay	Norway Jens Lurås Oftebro; Ida Marie Hagen; Gyda Westvold Hansen; Jarl Magnus Riiber	Germany Vinzenz Geiger; Jenny Nowak; Nathalie Armbruster; Julian Schmid	Austria Stefan Rettenegger; Annalena Slamik; Lisa Hirner; Johannes Lamparter	not included in the World Cup	

== Provisional Competition Rounds (PCR) ==
=== Men ===
No.	Place	Provisional Round	Competition	Size	Winner	Ref.
1	(Finland) Ruka	24 November 2022	25, 26, 27 November 2022	LH	(Austria) Mario Seidl	
2	(Norway) Lillehammer	2 December 2022	3 December 2022	NH	(Norway) Jarl Magnus Riiber	
3	(Austria) Ramsau	15 December 2022	16, 17 December 2022	NH	(Japan) Ryōta Yamamoto	
4	(Estonia) Otepää	6 January 2023	7, 8 January 2023	NH	(Germany) Julian Schmid	
	(France) Chaux-Neuve	20 January 2023	21, 22 January 2023	LH	cancelled due to lack of snow	
	(Germany) Klingenthal	20 January 2023	21, 22 January 2023	LH	cancelled due to strong wind	
5	(Austria) Seefeld	26 January 2023	27, 28, 29 January 2023	NH	(Japan) Ryōta Yamamoto	
6	(Germany) Oberstdorf	3 February 2023	4, 5 February 2023	LH	(Austria) Johannes Lamparter	
7	(Germany) Schonach	10 February 2023	11, 12 February 2023	NH	(Japan) Ryōta Yamamoto	
8	(Norway) Oslo	10 March 2023	11, 12 March 2023	LH	(Norway) Jarl Magnus Riiber	
9	(Finland) Lahti	24 March 2023	25, 26 March 2023	LH	(Norway) Jarl Magnus Riiber	

=== Women ===
No.	Place	Provisional Round	Competition	Size	Winner	Ref.
1	(Norway) Lillehammer	1 December 2022	2, 3 December 2022	NH	(Norway) Gyda Westvold Hansen	
2	(Austria) Ramsau	15 December 2022	16, 17 December 2022	NH	(Norway) Gyda Westvold Hansen	
3	(Estonia) Otepää	6 January 2023	7, 8 January 2023	NH	(Norway) Gyda Westvold Hansen	
4	(Austria) Seefeld	26 January 2023	27, 28 January 2023	NH	(Norway) Gyda Westvold Hansen	
5	(Germany) Schonach	10 February 2023	11, 12 February 2023	NH	(Norway) Gyda Westvold Hansen	
6	(Norway) Oslo	9 March 2023	9 March 2023	NH	(Norway) Gyda Westvold Hansen	

== Podium table by nation ==
Table showing the World Cup podium places (gold–1st place, silver–2nd place, bronze–3rd place) by the countries represented by the athletes.

Rank	Nation	Gold	Silver	Bronze	Total
1	Norway	22	12	7	41
2	Austria	7	6	9	22
3	Germany	5	9	11	25
4	Italy	0	3	0	3
5	Japan	0	1	3	4
6	Estonia	0	1	2	3
6	France	0	1	2	3
8	Finland	0	1	0	1
Totals (8 entries)		34	34	34	102

== Points distribution ==
The table shows the number of points won in the 2022/23 FIS Nordic Combined World Cup for men and women.

Place	1	2	3	4	5	6	7	8	9	10	11	12	13	14	15	16	17	18	19	20	21	22	23	24	25	26	27	28	29	30
Individual	100	80	60	50	45	40	36	32	29	26	24	22	20	18	16	15	14	13	12	11	10	9	8	7	6	5	4	3	2	1
Nordic Combined Triple – Days 1 & 2	50	40	30	25	23	20	18	16	15	13	12	11	10	9	8		7		6		5		4		3		2		1
Nordic Combined Triple – Day 3	200	160	120	100	90	80	72	64	58	52	48	44	40	36	32	30	29	26	24	22	20	18	16	14	12	10	8	6	4	2
Relay, Mixed Team	400	350	300	250	200	150	100	50
Team Sprint	200	175	150	125	100	75	50	25

== Achievements ==
First World Cup career victory

Men

- (Germany) Julian Schmid (23), in his 5th season – the WC 1 in Ruka

Women

First World Cup podium

Men

- (France) Matteo Baud (20), in his 3rd season – the WC 3 in Ruka – 2nd place
- (Austria) Thomas Rettenegger (22) in his 3rd season – the WC 8 in Otepää – 3rd place
- (France) Laurent Muhlethaler (25) in his 7th season – the WC 18 in Schonach – 3rd place

Women

- (Germany) Nathalie Armbruster (16), in her 2nd season – the WC 1 in Lillehammer – 3rd place
- (Germany) Jenny Nowak (20), in her 3rd season – the WC 8 in Schonach – 2nd place

Number of wins this season (in brackets are all-time wins)

Men

- (Norway) Jarl Magnus Riiber – 8 (57)
- (Austria) Johannes Lamparter – 7 (10)
- (Norway) Jens Lurås Oftebro – 3 (4)
- (Germany) Julian Schmid – 3 (3)
- (Germany) Vinzenz Geiger – 1 (10)

Women

- (Norway) Gyda Westvold Hansen – 10 (17)

== Retirements ==
Following are notable Nordic combined skiers who announced their retirement:

Men

- (Germany) Eric Frenzel
- (United States) Jasper Good
- (Austria) Philipp Orter

Women
