= FIS Nordic World Ski Championships 2021 – Team sprint large hill/2 × 7,5 km =

Team sprint large hill/2 × 7,5 km at the FIS Nordic World Ski Championships 2021
- Location: Oberstdorf, Germany
- Date: 6 March
- Competitors: 28 from 14 nations
- Teams: 14
- Winning time: 29:29.7

Medalists
gold medal	Johannes Lamparter; Lukas Greiderer	Austria
silver medal	Espen Andersen; Jarl Magnus Riiber	Norway
bronze medal	Fabian Rießle; Eric Frenzel	Germany

The Team sprint large hill/2 × 7,5 km competition at the FIS Nordic World Ski Championships 2021 was held on 6 March 2021.

== Results ==
=== Ski jumping ===
The ski jumping part was started at 10:00.

Rank	Bib	Country	Distance (m)	Points	Time difference
1	11	Japan; Akito Watabe; Ryōta Yamamoto	136.0; 136.0	296.0; 147.3; 148.7	
2	12	Austria; Johannes Lamparter; Lukas Greiderer	140.5; 133.0	295.0; 152.5; 142.5	+0:02
3	13	Norway; Espen Andersen; Jarl Magnus Riiber	133.5; 130.5	278.8; 141.3; 137.5	+0:34
4	14	Germany; Eric Frenzel; Fabian Rießle	132.0; 123.0	260.2; 139.0; 121.2	+1:12
5	9	France; Matteo Baud; Laurent Mühlethaler	123.0; 127.5	255.2; 121.6; 133.6	+1:22
6	10	Finland; Eero Hirvonen; Ilkka Herola	120.5; 127.0	244.6; 115.9; 128.7	+1:43
7	4	Slovenia; Vid Vrhovnik; Gašper Brecl	116.5; 108.0	206.3; 110.6; 95.7	+2:59
8	7	Czech Republic; Ondřej Pažout; Jan Vytrval	116.5; 103.5	196.9; 111.7; 85.2	+3:18
9	5	Poland; Szczepan Kupczak; Andrzej Szczechowicz	120.5; 98.0	193.8; 120.7; 73.1	+3:24
10	8	Estonia; Kristjan Ilves; Andreas Ilves	124.5; 88.0	181.7; 127.2; 54.5	+3:49
11	6	United States; Ben Loomis; Taylor Fletcher	109.0; 97.5	171.5; 95.2; 76.3	+4:09
12	3	Russian Ski Federation; Aleksandr Milanin; Samir Mastiev	97.0; 89.0	131.2; 73.3; 57.9	+5:30
13	2	Ukraine; Viktor Pasichnyk; Dmytro Mazurchuk	89.0; 92.5	123.0; 61.0; 62.0	+5:46
14	1	Kazakhstan; Magzhan Amankeldiuly; Chingiz Rakparov	87.0; 81.0	97.7; 53.2; 44.5	+6:37

=== Cross-country skiing ===
The cross-country skiing part was started at 15:00.

Rank	Bib	Country	Start time	Cross-country time	Rank	Finish time	Deficit
1st place, gold medalist(s)	2	Austria; Johannes Lamparter; Lukas Greiderer	0:02	29:27.7; 14:24.4; 15:03.3	2	29:29.7	
2nd place, silver medalist(s)	3	Norway; Espen Andersen; Jarl Magnus Riiber	0:34	29:35.3; 14:35.6; 14:59.7	4	30:09.3	+39.6
3rd place, bronze medalist(s)	4	Germany; Fabian Rießle; Eric Frenzel	1:12	29:25.1; 14:12.9; 15:12.2	1	30:37.1	+1:07.4
4	1	Japan; Ryōta Yamamoto; Akito Watabe	0:00	30:38.9; 15:14.3; 15:24.6	9	30:38.9	+1:09.2
5	6	Finland; Ilkka Herola; Eero Hirvonen	1:43	29:29.4; 14:17.8; 15:11.6	3	31:12.4	+1:42.7
6	5	France; Laurent Mühlethaler; Matteo Baud	1:22	30:14.2; 14:55.0; 15:19.2	7	31:36.2	+2:06.5
7	8	Czech Republic; Ondřej Pažout; Jan Vytrval	3:18	30:22.3; 14:58.4; 15:23.9	8	33:40.3	+4:10.6
8	10	Estonia; Andreas Ilves; Kristjan Ilves	3:49	30:11.3; 14:56.2; 15:15.1	6	34:00.3	+4:30.6
9	11	United States; Taylor Fletcher; Ben Loomis	4:09	30:07.1; 14:23.7; 15:43.4	5	34:16.1	+4:46.4
10	7	Slovenia; Vid Vrhovnik; Gašper Brecl	2:59	Lapped			
11	9	Poland; Szczepan Kupczak; Andrzej Szczechowicz	3:24	Lapped			
12	13	Ukraine; Viktor Pasichnyk; Dmytro Mazurchuk	5:46	Lapped			
13	12	Russian Ski Federation; Samir Mastiev; Aleksandr Milanin	5:30	Lapped			
14	14	Kazakhstan; Chingiz Rakparov; Magzhan Amankeldiuly	6:37	Lapped			
