= Cross-country skiing at the 2017 Asian Winter Games – Women's sprint classical =

Asian Winter Games

Women's sprint classical at the 2017 Asian Winter Games
- Venue: Shirahatayama Open Stadium
- Dates: 20 February 2017
- Competitors: 18 from 7 nations

Medalists
gold medal	Man Dandan	China
silver medal	Yelena Kolomina	Kazakhstan
bronze medal	Ju Hye-ri	South Korea

The women's sprint classical at the 2017 Asian Winter Games was held on 20 February 2017 at the Shirahatayama Open Stadium in Sapporo, Japan.

== Schedule ==
All times are Japan Standard Time (UTC+09:00)

Date	Time	Event
Monday, 20 February 2017	09:30	Qualification
Monday, 20 February 2017	11:00	Quarterfinals
Monday, 20 February 2017	11:40	Semifinals
Monday, 20 February 2017	12:05	Finals

== Results ==
=== Qualification ===
Rank	Athlete	Time
1	Casey Wright (AUS)	3:52.84
2	Man Dandan (CHN)	3:57.92
3	Yuki Kobayashi (JPN)	3:59.17
4	Hikari Miyazaki (JPN)	4:00.82
5	Marina Matrossova (KAZ)	4:03.95
6	Angelina Shuryga (KAZ)	4:03.98
7	Yelena Kolomina (KAZ)	4:04.79
8	Ju Hye-ri (KOR)	4:04.90
9	Kozue Takizawa (JPN)	4:05.87
10	Li Hongxue (CHN)	4:06.30
11	Chi Chunxue (CHN)	4:06.61
12	Han Da-som (KOR)	4:08.41
13	Je Sang-mi (KOR)	4:09.05
14	Tamara Ebel (KAZ)	4:10.61
15	Karen Chanloung (THA)	4:11.94
16	Li Xin (CHN)	4:12.14
17	Choe Shin-ae (KOR)	4:19.79
18	Kunduz Abdykadyrova (KGZ)	5:42.65

=== Quarterfinals ===
==== Heat 1 ====
Rank	Athlete	Time
1	Ju Hye-ri (KOR)	3:54.58
2	Casey Wright (AUS)	3:54.58
3	Kozue Takizawa (JPN)	4:01.09
4	Li Xin (CHN)	4:01.09

==== Heat 2 ====
Rank	Athlete	Time
1	Marina Matrossova (KAZ)	4:00.40
2	Hikari Miyazaki (JPN)	4:00.40
3	Je Sang-mi (KOR)	4:01.82
4	Han Da-som (KOR)	4:04.31

==== Heat 3 ====
Rank	Athlete	Time
1	Man Dandan (CHN)	3:53.05
2	Yelena Kolomina (KAZ)	3:55.54
3	Li Hongxue (CHN)	3:57.16
4	Karen Chanloung (THA)	4:06.83

==== Heat 4 ====
Rank	Athlete	Time
1	Angelina Shuryga (KAZ)	3:54.64
2	Tamara Ebel (KAZ)	3:55.30
3	Chi Chunxue (CHN)	3:55.30
4	Yuki Kobayashi (JPN)	3:55.30

=== Semifinals ===
==== Heat 1 ====
Rank	Athlete	Time
1	Casey Wright (AUS)	3:58.18
2	Ju Hye-ri (KOR)	3:58.82
3	Marina Matrossova (KAZ)	4:03.09
4	Hikari Miyazaki (JPN)	4:03.78

==== Heat 2 ====
Rank	Athlete	Time
1	Man Dandan (CHN)	3:52.72
2	Yelena Kolomina (KAZ)	3:55.51
3	Tamara Ebel (KAZ)	3:59.70
4	Angelina Shuryga (KAZ)	4:02.17

=== Finals ===
==== Final B ====
Rank	Athlete	Time
1	Angelina Shuryga (KAZ)	4:04.98
2	Tamara Ebel (KAZ)	4:04.98
3	Hikari Miyazaki (JPN)	4:07.46
4	Marina Matrossova (KAZ)	4:14.14

==== Final A ====
Rank	Athlete	Time
1st place, gold medalist(s)	Man Dandan (CHN)	3:48.29
2nd place, silver medalist(s)	Yelena Kolomina (KAZ)	3:53.35
3	Casey Wright (AUS)	3:58.78
3rd place, bronze medalist(s)	Ju Hye-ri (KOR)	4:08.58

- Ju Hye-ri was awarded bronze because Australia as guest nation, was ineligible to win any medals.
