= Cross-country skiing at the 2017 Asian Winter Games – Men's 4 × 7.5 kilometre relay =

Men's 4 × 7.5 kilometre relay at the 2017 Asian Winter Games
- Venue: Shirahatayama Open Stadium
- Dates: 24 February 2017
- Competitors: 16 from 4 nations

Medalists
gold medal	Japan; Nobuhito Kashiwabara, Kohei Shimizu, Naoto Baba, Akira Lenting
silver medal	Kazakhstan; Sergey Cherepanov, Yerdos Akhmadiyev, Nikolay Chebotko, Rinat Mukhin
bronze medal	South Korea; Hwang Jun-ho, Park Seong-beom, Kim Min-woo, Magnus Kim

The men's 4 × 7.5 kilometre relay at the 2017 Asian Winter Games was held on 24 February 2017 at the Shirahatayama Open Stadium in Sapporo, Japan.

== Schedule ==
All times are Japan Standard Time (UTC+09:00)

Date	Time	Event
Friday, 24 February 2017	12:30	Final

== Results ==
Rank	Team	Time
1st place, gold medalist(s)	Japan (JPN)	1:27:30.3
	Nobuhito Kashiwabara	23:54.4
	Kohei Shimizu	21:27.1
	Naoto Baba	21:18.1
	Akira Lenting	20:50.7
2nd place, silver medalist(s)	Kazakhstan (KAZ)	1:27:49.4
	Sergey Cherepanov	23:42.1
	Yerdos Akhmadiyev	21:45.0
	Nikolay Chebotko	21:13.1
	Rinat Mukhin	21:09.2
3rd place, bronze medalist(s)	South Korea (KOR)	1:30:12.2
	Hwang Jun-ho	23:53.6
	Park Seong-beom	21:53.9
	Kim Min-woo	22:47.8
	Magnus Kim	21:36.9
4	China (CHN)	1:33:50.4
	Sun Qinghai	23:56.2
	Shang Jincai	21:37.3
	Zhu Mingliang	23:18.7
	Wang Qiang	24:58.2
