= 2024 World Single Distances Speed Skating Championships – Women's team sprint =

Women's team sprint at the 2024 World Single Distances Speed Skating Championships
- Venue: Olympic Oval
- Location: Calgary, Canada
- Dates: February 15
- Competitors: 24 from 8 nations
- Teams: 8
- Winning time: 1:25.14

Medalists
gold medal	Carolina Hiller; Maddison Pearman; Ivanie Blondin	Canada
silver medal	Sarah Warren; Erin Jackson; Brittany Bowe	United States
bronze medal	Andżelika Wójcik; Iga Wojtasik; Karolina Bosiek	Poland

The Women's team sprint competition at the 2024 World Single Distances Speed Skating Championships was held on February 15, 2024.

== Results ==
The race was started at 15:27.

Rank	Pair	Lane	Country	Time	Diff
1st place, gold medalist(s)	2	o	Canada; Carolina Hiller; Maddison Pearman; Ivanie Blondin	1:25.14	
2nd place, silver medalist(s)	2	i	United States; Sarah Warren; Erin Jackson; Brittany Bowe	1:26.04	+0.90
3rd place, bronze medalist(s)	3	i	Poland; Andżelika Wójcik; Iga Wojtasik; Karolina Bosiek	1:26.63	+1.49
4	3	o	Netherlands; Marrit Fledderus; Jutta Leerdam; Antoinette Rijpma-de Jong	1:26.86	+1.72
5	1	i	Kazakhstan; Inessa Shumekova; Alina Dauranova; Yekaterina Aydova	1:27.23	+2.09
6	4	i	Germany; Josephine Heimerl; Lea Sophie Scholz; Michelle Uhrig	1:29.30	+4.16
7	1	o	South Korea; Lee Na-hyun; Kim Min-sun; Kang Soo-min	1:29.77	+4.63
8	4	o	China; Pei Chong; Tian Ruining; Jin Wenjing	1:30.34	+5.20
