= Poland at the 2023 Winter World University Games =

- IOC code: POL
- NOC: University Sports Association of Poland
- Website: azs.pl

in Lake Placid, United States 12 January 2023 – 22 January 2023
- Competitors: 55 (30 men and 25 women) in 8 sports
- Flag bearer: Marek Kania (speed skating)
- Medals: Gold 5 Silver 6 Bronze 7 Total 18

Winter Universiade appearances
- 1960; 1962; 1964; 1966; 1968; 1972; 1978; 1981; 1983; 1985; 1987; 1989; 1991; 1993; 1995; 1997; 1999; 2001; 2003; 2005; 2007; 2009; 2011; 2013; 2015; 2017; 2019; 2023; 2025

Poland competed at the 2023 Winter World University Games in Lake Placid, United States, from 12 to 22 January 2023.

The flagbearer at the opening ceremony was Marek Kania.

== Medalists ==
Medal	Name	Sport	Event
Gold	Nicole Konderla	Ski Jumping	Women's NH Individual
Gold	Anna Nędza-Kubiniec	Biathlon	Women's 7.5km Sprint
Gold	Nicole Konderla, Adam Niżnik	Ski Jumping	Mixed event Team normal hill
Gold	Olga Kaczmarek, Natalia Jabrzyk, Iga Wojtasik	Speed Skating	Women's Team Pursuit
Silver	Barbara Skrobiszewska	Biathlon	Women's 12.5 km short individual
Silver	Iga Wojtasik	Speed Skating	Women's 1000m
Silver	Natalia Jabrzyk	Speed Skating	Women's 1500m
Bronze	Joanna Kil	Nordic Combined	Women's Individual Mass Start (5km / NH)
Bronze	Kinga Rajda	Ski Jumping	Women's NH Individual
Bronze	Kinga Rajda, Szymon Jojko	Ski Jumping	Mixed event Team normal hill
Bronze	Marek Kania	Speed Skating	Men's 500m

== Competitors ==
At the 2023 Winter World University Games will participate 55 athletes. 7 of them also competed at the 2019 Winter Universiade.

Athlete	Date of birth	Sport	Club	Sex
Martyna Baran	19 February 2001	Speed skating	WTŁ Stegny Warszawa	F
Szymon Bębenek	6 January 1998	Alpine skiing	AZS Zakopane	M
Michał Boreczek	15 February 2000	Cross-country skiing	KS AZS AWF Katowice	M
Sebastian Bryja	10 February 2002	Cross-country skiing	UKS Regle Kościelisko	M
Patryk Bryn	9 November 1998	Biathlon	KS AZS AWF Katowice	M
Błażej Budz	30 May 2003	Alpine skiing	Mitanski Zakopane	M
Robert Bugara	10 February 2002	Cross-country skiing	UKS Regle Kościelisko	M
Wiktoria Celczyńska	25 October 2000	Biathlon	KS AZS AWF Katowice	F
Maria Chyc	20 February 1999	Snowboarding	AZS Zakopane	F
Maja Chyla	8 October 2001	Alpine skiing	KS Yeti	F
Paulina Cieślar	5 April 2002	Ski jumping	KS AZS AWF Katowice	F
Zuzanna Czapska	8 April 1998	Alpine skiing	Warszawski Klub Narciarski	F
Wojciech Filip	25 June 1999	Biathlon	KS AZS AWF Wrocław	M
Mateusz Gruszka	4 April 2001	Ski jumping	AZS Zakopane	M
Mateusz Haratyk	27 May 1998	Cross-country skiing	NKS Trójwieś Beskidzka	M
Natalia Jabrzyk	3 March 2001	Speed skating	KS Pilica Tomaszów Mazowiecki	F
Wojciech Janik	12 March 2000	Biathlon	KS AZS AWF Wrocław	M
Jan Jaromin	5 December 2001	Snowboarding	KS AZS AWF Katowice	M
Szymon Jojko	24 July 2001	Ski jumping	KS AZS AWF Katowice	M
Olga Kaczmarek	4 October 1999	Speed skating	KS AZS AWF Katowice	F
Karolina Kaleta	10 November 2002	Cross-country skiing	LKS MARKAM Wisniowa-Osieczany	F
Weronika Kaleta	21 June 1999	Cross-country skiing	LKS MARKAM Wisniowa-Osieczany	F
Marek Kania	2 April 1999	Speed skating	Fundacja ŁiSW Legia Warszawa	M
Karol Karczewski	27 February 2001	Speed skating	Fundacja ŁiSW Legia Warszawa	M
Joanna Kil	9 July 2002	Nordic combined	KS Chochołów	F
Nicole Konderla	8 December 2001	Ski jumping	KS AZS AWF Katowice	F
Daria Krajewska	6 January 1998	Alpine skiing	AZS Zakopane	F
Karolina Kukuczka	14 December 2002	Cross-country skiing	MKS Istebna	F
Ekaterina Kurakova	24 June 2002	Figure skating	MKS Axel Toruń	F
Olimpia Kwiatkowska	31 January 2000	Snowboarding	AZS Zakopane	F
Patryk Majerczyk	6 August 2003	Snowboarding	F2 Dawidek Team	M
Juliusz Mitan	12 March 1999	Alpine skiing	Mitanski Zakopane	M
Piotr Nałęcki	9 July 2000	Speed skating	KS AZS AWF Katowice	M
Anna Nędza-Kubiniec	4 July 2003	Biathlon	BKS WP Kościelisko	F
Karol Niemczyk	6 May 2001	Ski jumping	LKS Klimczok Bystra	M
Adam Niżnik	7 October 2002	Ski jumping	TS Wisła Zakopane	M
Gaweł Oficjalski	7 December 1998	Speed skating	KS AZS AWF Katowice	M
Krzysztof Owczarek	31 December 2004	Snowboarding	Stowarzyszenie HIGH 5	M
Przemysław Pancerz	30 September 1998	Biathlon	KS AZS AWF Wrocław	M
Jakub Piotrowski	27 February 2000	Speed skating	KS Pilica Tomaszów Mazowiecki	M
Natasza Piwowarczyk	9 September 2004	Snowboarding	F2 Dawidek Team	F
Maja Płończyk	21 June 2001	Speed skating	KS AZS AWF Katowice	F
Kinga Rajda	22 December 2000	Ski jumping	KS AZS AWF Katowice	F
Mikołaj Rutkowski	25 September 1999	Snowboarding	AZS Zakopane	M
Maksymilian Rzepka	19 August 2003	Speed skating	KS SNPTT 1907 ZAKOPANE	M
Michał Skowron	5 September 1998	Cross-country skiing	KS AZS AWF Katowice	M
Barbara Skrobiszewska	5 January 2003	Biathlon	MKS Karkonosze	F
Adam Skupień	31 March 2002	Nordic combined	LKS Poroniec Poronin	M
Magdalena Smędzik	19 September 2003	Speed skating		F
Andrzej Szczechowicz	14 September 2000	Nordic combined	TS Wisła Zakopane	M
Paweł Szyndlar	19 July 2000	Nordic combined	SS-R LZS Sokół Szczyrk	M
Klaudia Topór	5 October 2002	Biathlon	BKS WP Kościelisko	F
Anna Twardosz	12 April 2001	Ski jumping	KS AZS AWF Katowice	F
Iga Wojtasik	28 June 2000	Speed skating	KS AZS AWF Katowice	F
Szymon Zapotoczny	6 May 2003	Ski jumping	KS Evenement Zakopane	M
