= Ryo Hirose =

Japanese cross-country skier (born 2000)

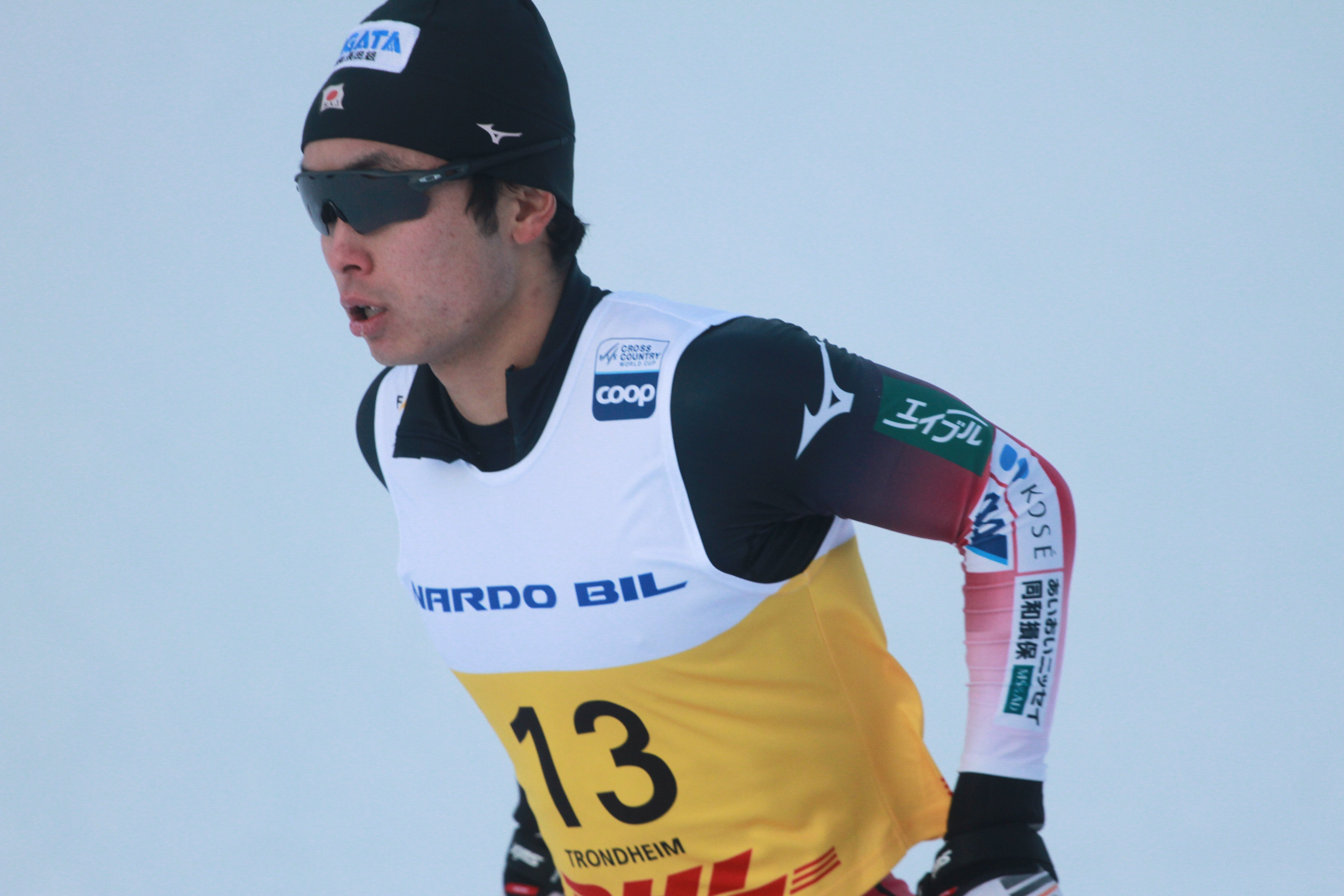

Personal information
- Nationality: Japan
- Born: 6 November 2000 (age 25) Toyama, Japan

Sport
- Sport: Skiing
- Club: Waseda University

World Cup career
- Seasons: 1 – (2022–present)
- Indiv. starts: 1
- Indiv. podiums: 0
- Team starts: 1
- Team podiums: 0
- Overall titles: 0
- Discipline titles: 0
Medal record
Winter Universiade
Gold medal – first place	2023 Lake Placid	Mixed team sprint
Gold medal – first place	2023 Lake Placid	10 km classical
Gold medal – first place	2023 Lake Placid	10 km freestyle pursuit
Bronze medal – third place	2023 Lake Placid	4 × 7.5 km relay
- Updated on 16 March 2022

Ryo Hirose (廣瀬崚, Hirose Ryo; born 6 November 2000) is a Japanese cross-country skier who competes internationally. He represented his country at the 2022 Winter Olympics.

== Cross-country skiing results ==
All results are sourced from the International Ski Federation (FIS).

=== Olympic Games ===
Year	Age	15 km individual	30 km skiathlon	50 km mass start	Sprint	4 × 10 km relay	Team sprint
2022	21	43	41	—^{[a]}	—	10	—

^{a} Distance reduced to 30 km due to weather conditions.

=== World Championships ===
Year	Age	15 km individual	30 km skiathlon	50 km mass start	Sprint	4 × 10 km relay	Team sprint
2023	22	—	23	29	—	10	—

=== World Cup ===
==== Season standings ====
Season	Age	Discipline standings				Ski Tour standings
Season	Age	Overall	Distance	Sprint	U23	Tour de Ski
2022	21	NC	NC	—	NC	—
