= Speed skating at the 2023 Winter World University Games =

Speed skating at the Lake Placid 2023 FISU World University Games
- Speed skating pictogram
- Venue: James B. Sheffield Olympic Skating Rink, Lake Placid, New York, United States
- Dates: 15–20 January 2023

Speed skating at the 2023 Winter World University Games was held from 15 to 20 January 2023 at the James B. Sheffield Olympic Skating Rink.

== Men's events ==
Event	Gold		Silver		Bronze	
500 metres	Wataru Morishige; Japan	35.30	Kazuya Yamada; Japan	35.84	Marek Kania; Poland	35.99
1000 metres	Kazuya Yamada; Japan	1:12.38	Taiyo Nonomura; Japan	1:12.50	David La Rue; Canada	1:12.57
1500 metres	Taiyo Nonomura; Japan	1:49.93	Kazuya Yamada; Japan	1:50.08	Motonaga Arito; Japan	1:50.42
5000 metres	Riccardo Lorello; Italy	6:53.22	Daniele Di Stefano; Italy	6:55.20	Motonaga Arito; Japan	7:03.03
Mass start	David La Rue; Canada	60 pts	Daniele Di Stefano; Italy	42 pts	Hubert Marcotte; Canada	20 pts
Team pursuit	Japan; Motonaga Arito; Yuto Tanigaki; Kazuya Yamada	4:07.52	South Korea; Ahn Hyun-jun; Chung Yang-hun; Park Sang-eon	4:09.62	Canada; David La Rue; Hubert Marcotte; Joshua Telizyn	4:11.28

== Women's events ==
Event	Gold		Silver		Bronze	
500 metres	Kim Min-sun; South Korea	38.53	Moe Kumagai; Japan	39.41	Park Chae-eun; South Korea	40.01
1000 metres	Kim Min-sun; South Korea	1:20.46	Iga Wojtasik; Poland	1:21.78	Park Chae-eun; South Korea	1:21.85
1500 metres	Park Ji-woo; South Korea	2:04.41	Natalia Jabrzyk; Poland	2:06.19	Veronika Antošová; Czech Republic	2:06.63
3000 metres	Laura Hall; Canada	4:25.70	Park Ji-woo; South Korea	4:28.18	Rose-Anne Grenier; Canada	4:29.10
Mass start	Misaki Shinno; Japan	60 pts	Yuka Takahashi; Japan	40 pts	Josephine Heimerl; Germany	20 pts
Team pursuit	Poland; Natalia Jabrzyk; Olga Kaczmarek; Iga Wojtasik	3:22.10	South Korea; Kang Soo-min; Kim Dong-hee; Park Ji-woo	3:25.35	Japan; Maho Karai; Kokoro Morino; Misaki Shinno	3:26.82

== Mixed events ==
Event	Gold		Silver		Bronze	
Mixed relay	South Korea; Ahn Hyun-jun; Kim Min-sun	3:10.84	Japan; Kotaro Kasahara; Yuka Takahashi	3:12.03	Spain; Alexander Rezzonico; Sara Cabrera	3:12.14

== Medal table ==
Rank	Nation	Gold	Silver	Bronze	Total
1	Japan	5	6	3	14
2	South Korea	4	3	2	9
3	Canada	2	0	4	6
4	Poland	1	2	1	4
5	Italy	1	2	0	3
6	Czech Republic	0	0	1	1
6	Germany	0	0	1	1
6	Spain	0	0	1	1
Totals (8 entries)		13	13	13	39

== Participating nations ==
- Austria (1)
- Canada (8)
- Czech Republic (2)
- Finland (2)
- France (2)
- Germany (2)
- Great Britain (3)
- Hungary (4)
- Italy (3)
- Japan (17)
- Kazakhstan (6)
- Netherlands (1)
- Norway (8)
- Poland (12)
- South Korea (15)
- Spain (4)
- Switzerland (3)
- United States (7)
