= Haruka Kasai =

Japanese Nordic combined skier (born 2004)

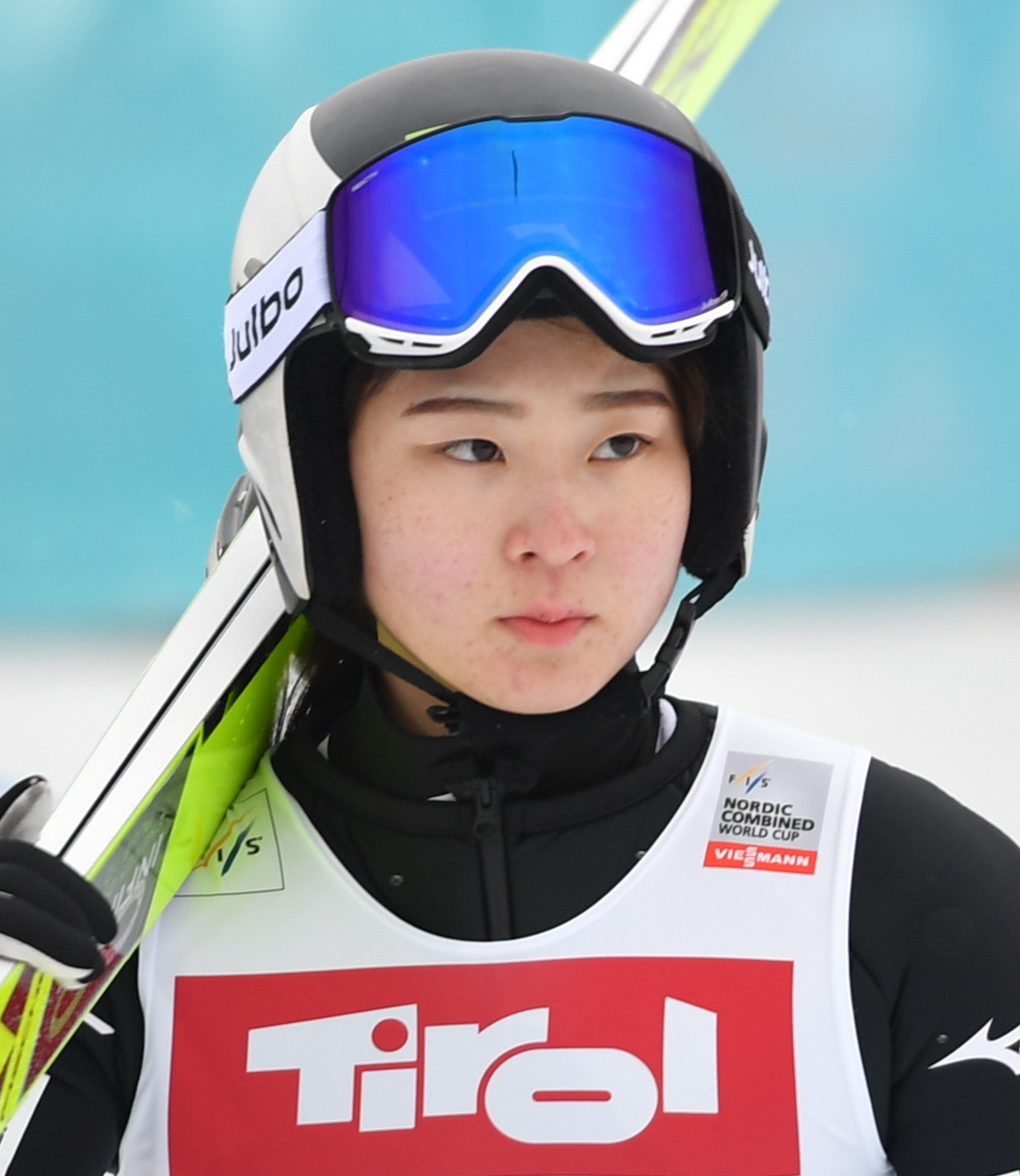
- Kasai in Seefeld in 2023

Personal information
- Nationality: Japanese
- Born: 4 February 2004 (age 22) Sapporo, Hokkaido, Japan

Sport
- Sport: Skiing
- Club: Waseda University

World Cup career
- Seasons: 2022–
- Indiv. podiums: 3
Medal record
Women's Nordic combined
Representing Japan
World Championships
Bronze medal – third place	2023 Planica	Individual
Bronze medal – third place	2025 Trondheim	Mass start
Winter Universiade
Gold medal – first place	2023 Lake Placid	Individual
Silver medal – second place	2023 Lake Placid	Mass start

Haruka Kasai (Japanese: 葛西 春香, Hepburn: Kasai Haruka; born 4 February 2004) is a Japanese Nordic combined skier and ski jumper. She has won two bronze medals at the FIS Nordic World Ski Championships.

== Early life ==
Kasai was born on 4 February 2004 in Sapporo, Hokkaido, and has an older twin sister, Yuna Kasai.

She graduated from Nishino Junior High School and Tokai University Sapporo High School. She is currently a part of the Waseda University Ski Club.

== Career ==
Kasai represented Japan at the 2020 Winter Youth Olympics, where she ranked 9th in the girls' individual Nordic combined event.

In December 2021, Kasai won the women's championship at the Nordic Ski Yoshida Cup Jump Tournament. She won silver medal in both individual Nordic combined event and the team ski jumping event at the 2022 Nordic Junior World Ski Championships. At the 2021–22 FIS Nordic Combined World Cup Kasai ranked second in her two competitions.

Kasai medaled bronze at the FIS Nordic World Ski Championships 2023, the first Japanese medal in her event. She also participated in the mixed team ski jumping event as part of the Japanese team, which ranked fifth. At the 2023 Winter World University Games in Lake Placid, Kasai medaled gold in the women's individual Nordic combined event and silver in the mass start event behind her sister. In the 2022–23 FIS Nordic Combined World Cup, Kasai ranked seventh overall.

== Statistics ==
=== World Championships ===
Year	Normal Hill	Mass Start Normal Hill	Mixed Team
2023	Bronze	—N/a	5
2025	7	Bronze	4

=== World Cup ===
==== Season titles ====
Season	Discipline
2025	Mass Start Trophy

==== Season standings ====
Season	Age	Overall	Best Jumper Trophy	Best Skier Trophy	Compact Trophy	Mass Start Trophy
2022	18	14	13	19	—N/a	—N/a
2023	19	7	8	6	—N/a	—N/a
2024	20	4	4	7	4	—N/a
2025	21	3rd place, bronze medalist(s)	2nd place, silver medalist(s)	4	4	1st place, gold medalist(s)
