= Ski jumping at the 2023 Winter World University Games =

Ski jumping competition

Ski jumping at the Lake Placid 2023 FISU World University Games
- Venue: Lake Placid Olympic Ski Jumping Complex
- Dates: 16–20 January 2023

Ski jumping at the 2023 Winter World University Games was held at the Lake Placid Olympic Ski Jumping Complex from 16 to 20 January 2023.

== Men's events ==
Event	Gold		Silver		Bronze	
Individual normal hill	Danil Vassilyev; Kazakhstan	257.3	Maximilian Lienher; Austria	251.4	Timon Kahofer; Austria	248.8
Team normal hill	Austria I Timon-Pascal Kahofer; Maximilian Lienher	470.5	Kazakhstan I Sergey Tkachenko; Danil Vassilyev	470.3	Japan I Sakutaro Kobayashi; Ryusei Ikeda	452.9

== Women's events ==
Event	Gold		Silver		Bronze	
Individual normal hill	Nicole Konderla; Poland	231.6	Machiko Kubota; Japan	224.8	Kinga Rajda; Poland	209.7
Team normal hill	Poland I Kinga Rajda; Nicole Konderla	397.9	Poland II; Paulina Cieślar; Anna Twardosz	357.0	Japan I Miki Ikeda; Machiko Kubota	327.4

== Mixed event ==
Event	Gold		Silver		Bronze	
Team normal hill	Poland; Nicole Konderla; Adam Niżnik	421.3	Japan; Machiko Kubota; Ryusei Ikeda	405.0	Poland; Kinga Rajda; Szymon Jojko	369.6

== Medal table ==
Rank	Nation	Gold	Silver	Bronze	Total
1	Poland	3	1	2	6
2	Austria	1	1	1	3
3	Kazakhstan	1	1	0	2
4	Japan	0	2	2	4
Totals (4 entries)		5	5	5	15

== Participating nations ==
7 nations participated.

- Austria (4)
- Czech Republic (1)
- Japan (9)
- Kazakhstan (6)
- Norway (2)
- Poland (9)
- United States (3)
