= Yuna Kasai =

Japanese Nordic combined skier

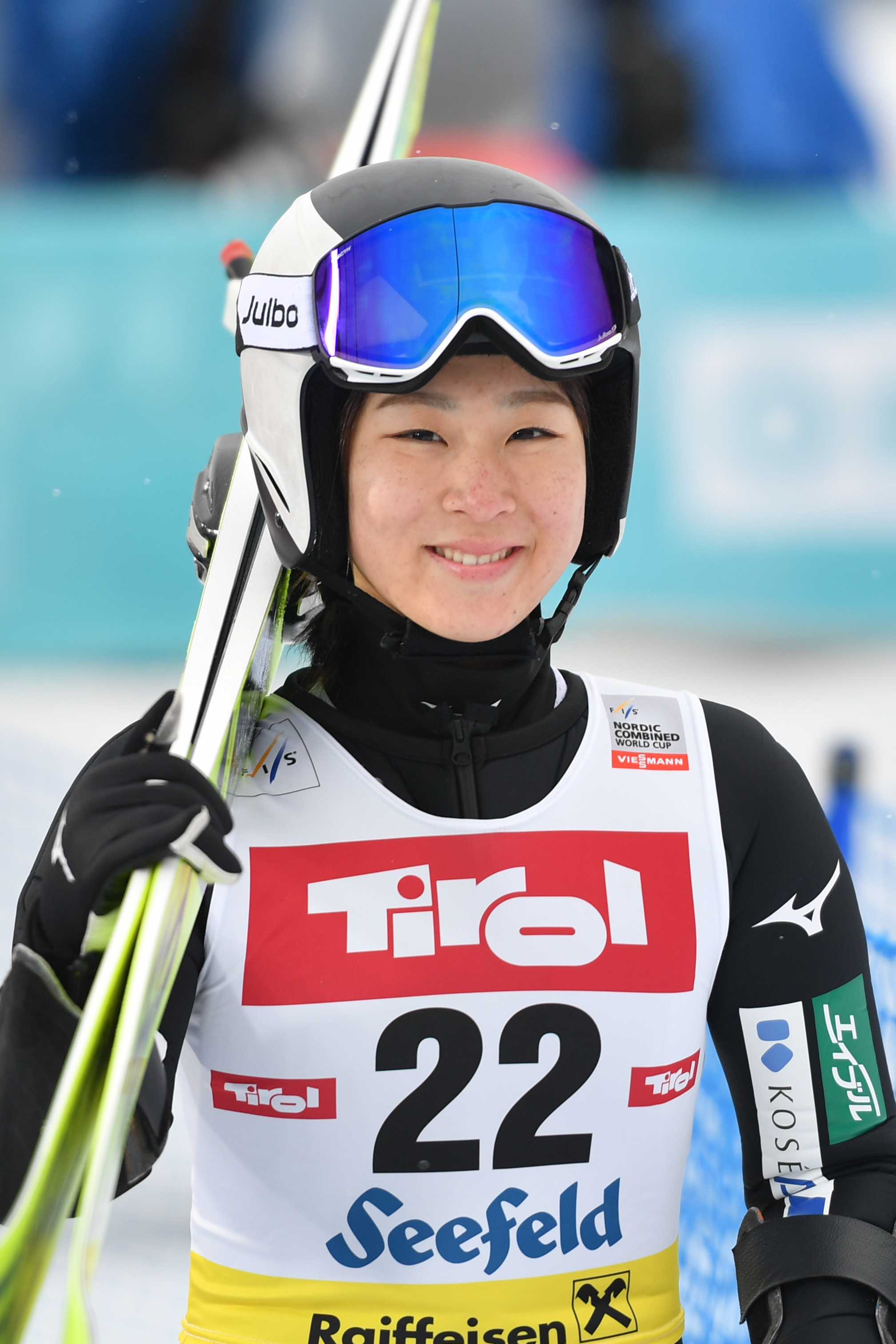
- Kasai in Seefeld in January 2023

Personal information
- Nationality: Japan
- Born: 4 February 2004 (age 22) Sapporo, Hokkaido, Japan
- Height: 165 cm (5 ft 5 in)

Sport
- Sport: Skiing
- Club: Waseda University

World Cup career
- Seasons: 2021–
- Indiv. podiums: 2
- Overall titles: 0 – (14th in 2021)
- Discipline titles: 0 –
Medal record
Women's Nordic combined
Representing Japan
World Championships
Gold medal – first place	2025 Trondheim	Mass start
Winter Universiade
Gold medal – first place	2023 Lake Placid	Mass start
Silver medal – second place	2023 Lake Placid	Individual

Yuna Kasai (葛西 優奈, Kasai Yūna; born February 4, 2004) is a Japanese Nordic combined skier and ski jumper. At the 2025 World Championships, she won gold in the mass start. At the 2021 Nordic Combined World Cup, she won bronze in both mass start and individual Nordic combined.

== Life ==
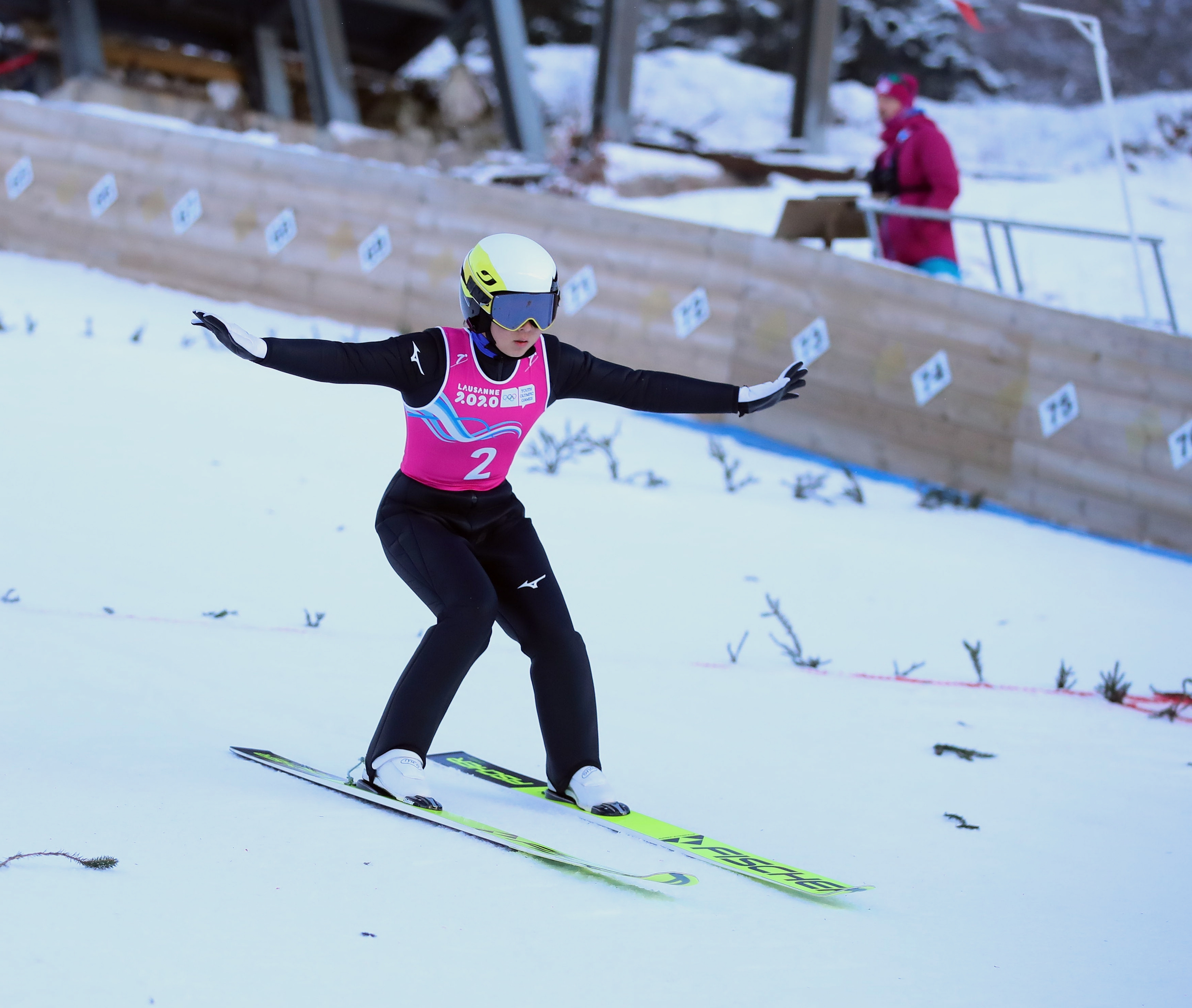
Kasai ski jumping at the 2020 Winter Youth Olympics

Kasai was born on February 4, 2004, in Sapporo, Hokkaido, Japan. She has a younger twin sister, Haruka Kasai. She joined the Sapporo Jump Shōnen Club. In March 2018, at the age of 14, she participated in the 96th Japan Ski Championship held in Nayoro, and finished fourth in Nordic combined/5 km, missing the bronze medal by 38 seconds. At the 97th Japan Ski Championship in 2019, she won her first national medal in Hakuba, Nagano Prefecture, after finishing second behind Ayane Miyazaki.

After graduating from Sapporo Nishino Middle School, she entered Tokai University Sapporo High School. At the 2020 Winter Youth Olympics in Lausanne, she finished sixth in individual ski jumping. At the 2021 Nordic Junior World Ski Championships held in Lahti, she finished fourth in individual Nordic combined. The same year at the Nordic Combined World Cup, she won bronze in mass start Nordic combined and also bronze in the individual category in Otepää.

In 2022, at the Nordic Combined World Cup, she placed fourth in both the individual and mass start category in Val di Fiemme.

== Statistics ==
=== World Championships ===
Year	Age	Normal Hill	Mass Start Normal Hill	Mixed Team
2021	17	15	—N/a	—N/a
2023	19	5	—N/a	5
2025	21	6	Gold	4

=== World Cup ===
==== Season standings ====
Season	Age	Overall	Best Jumper Trophy	Best Skier Trophy	Compact Trophy	Mass Start Trophy
2022	18	8	5	16	—N/a	—N/a
2023	19	6	5	12	—N/a	—N/a
2024	20	9	12	12	15	—N/a
2025	21	4	3rd place, bronze medalist(s)	10	5	3rd place, bronze medalist(s)

=== Continental Cup ===
==== Season standings ====
Season	Placement	Points
2019/20	28th	58
2020/21	25th	63
