= Motonaga Arito =

Japanese speed skater (born 2002)

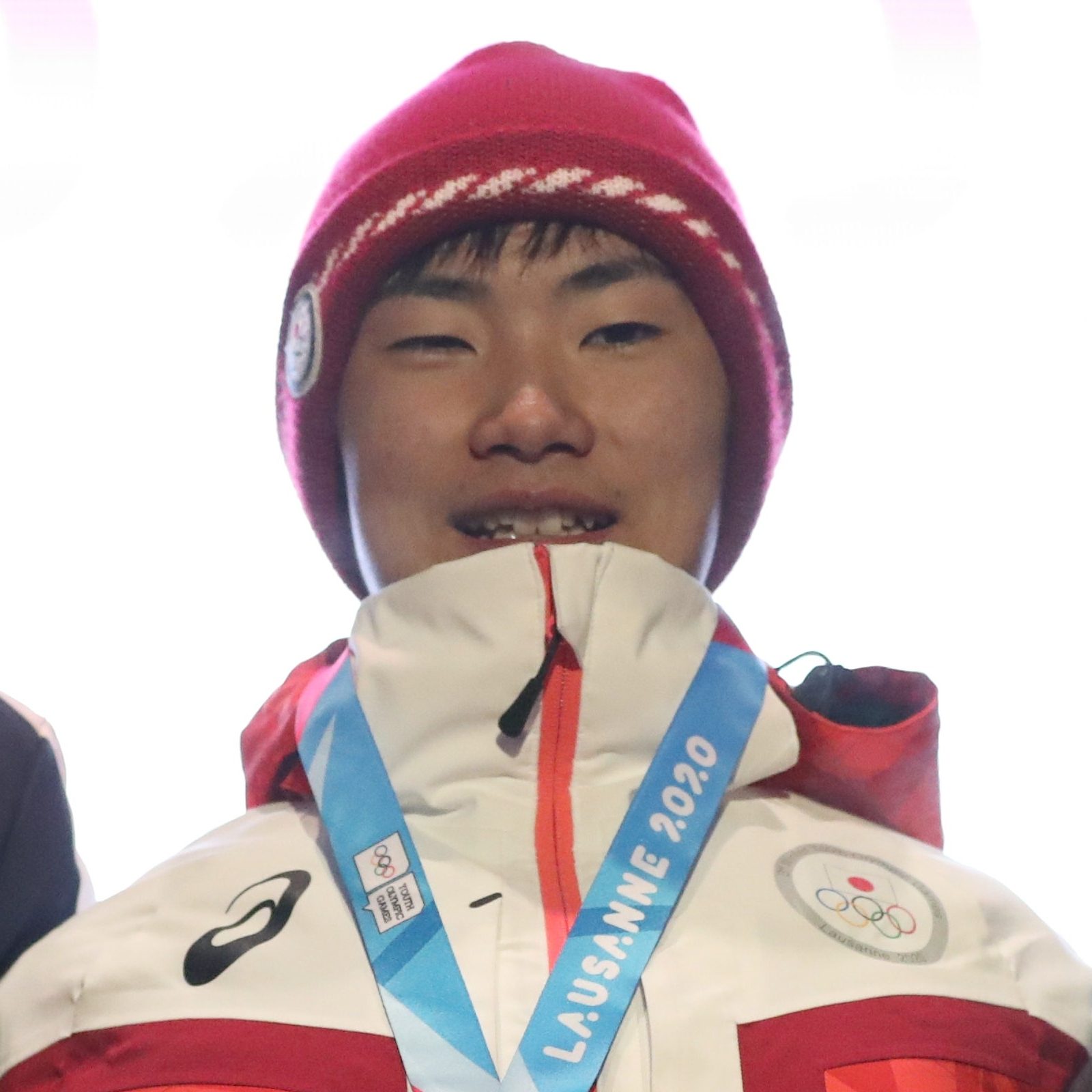
- Arito at the 2020 Winter Youth Olympics

Personal information
- Nationality: Japanese
- Born: 18 March 2002 (age 24) Hokkaido, Japan

Sport
- Country: Japan
- Sport: Speed skating
- Event(s): 1500 m, 5000 m, team pursuit
Medal record
Men's speed skating
Representing Japan
World University Games
Gold medal – first place	2023 Lake Placid	Team pursuit
Bronze medal – third place	2023 Lake Placid	1500 m
Bronze medal – third place	2023 Lake Placid	5000 m
Asian Games
Bronze medal – third place	2025 Harbin	Team pursuit
Winter Youth Olympics
Gold medal – first place	2020 Gangwon	1500 m
Gold medal – first place	2020 Gangwon	Mass start

Motonaga Arito 蟻戸 一永 (born 18 March 2002) is a Japanese speed-skater.

== Career ==
Arito represented Japan at the 2020 Winter Youth Olympics and won a gold medal in the 1500 metres with a time of 1:52.24. He also won a gold medal in the mass start with a time of 6:29.72.

He competed at the 2023 Winter World University Games and won a gold medal in the team pursuit with a time of 4:07.52. He also won bronze medals in the 1500 metres and 5000 metres.
