= Marina Matrossova =

Kazakhstani cross-country skier (born 1990)

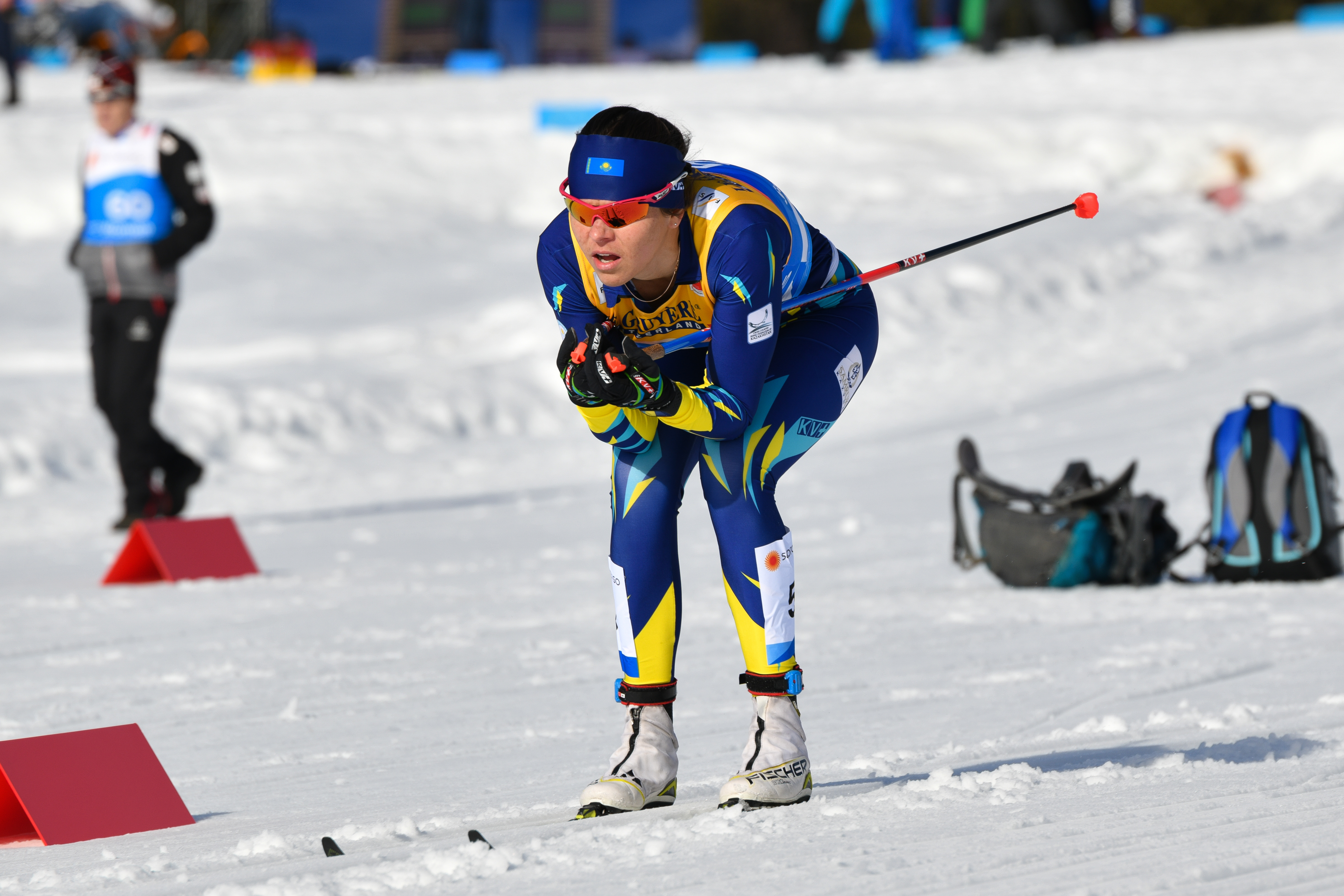
Marina Matrosova

Marina Matrosova (born 2 July 1990) is a cross-country skier from Kazakhstan who has competed since 2008. At the 2010 Winter Olympics in Vancouver, she finished 35th in the 30 km event and 48th both in the individual sprint and 7.5 km + 7.5 km double pursuit events.

Matrosova's best World Cup finish was 12th in a team sprint event while her best individual finish was 40th in a 15 km event at Slovenia in December 2009.
