= Lukas Greiderer =

Austrian Nordic combined skier (born 1993)

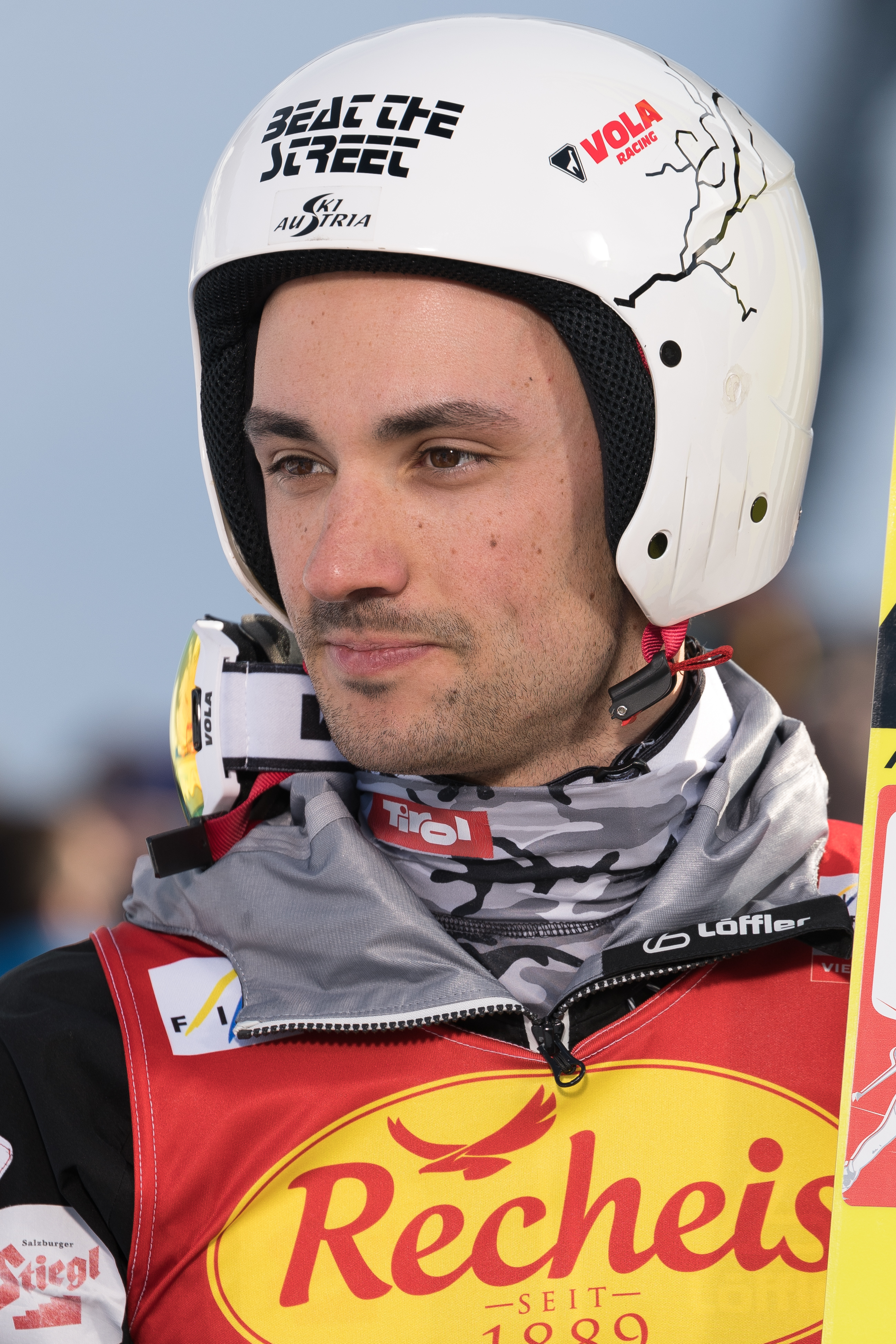
- Greiderer in 2018

Personal information
- Nationality: Austria
- Born: 8 July 1993 (age 33)
- Height: 1.84 m (6 ft 0 in)

Sport
- Sport: Skiing
- Club: HSV Absam Bergisel-Tirol

World Cup career
- Seasons: 2014–2026
- Indiv. starts: 167
- Indiv. podiums: 3
- Indiv. wins: 0
- Team starts: 8
- Team podiums: 5
- Team wins: 0
- Overall titles: 0 – (9th in 2021)
- Discipline titles: 0
Medal record
Men's Nordic combined
Representing Austria
Olympic Games
Bronze medal – third place	2022 Beijing	Individual NH
World Championships
Gold medal – first place	2021 Oberstdorf	Team sprint
Bronze medal – third place	2021 Oberstdorf	Team NH
Bronze medal – third place	2023 Planica	Team LH

Lukas Greiderer (born 8 July 1993) is an Austrian former Nordic combined skier.

He participated at the team event at the FIS Nordic World Ski Championships 2021, where he won gold and bronze medal in team events.

At the 2022 Winter Olympics, Greiderer won a bronze medal in the individual normal hill/10 km event.
