= Kinga Rajda =

Polish ski jumper

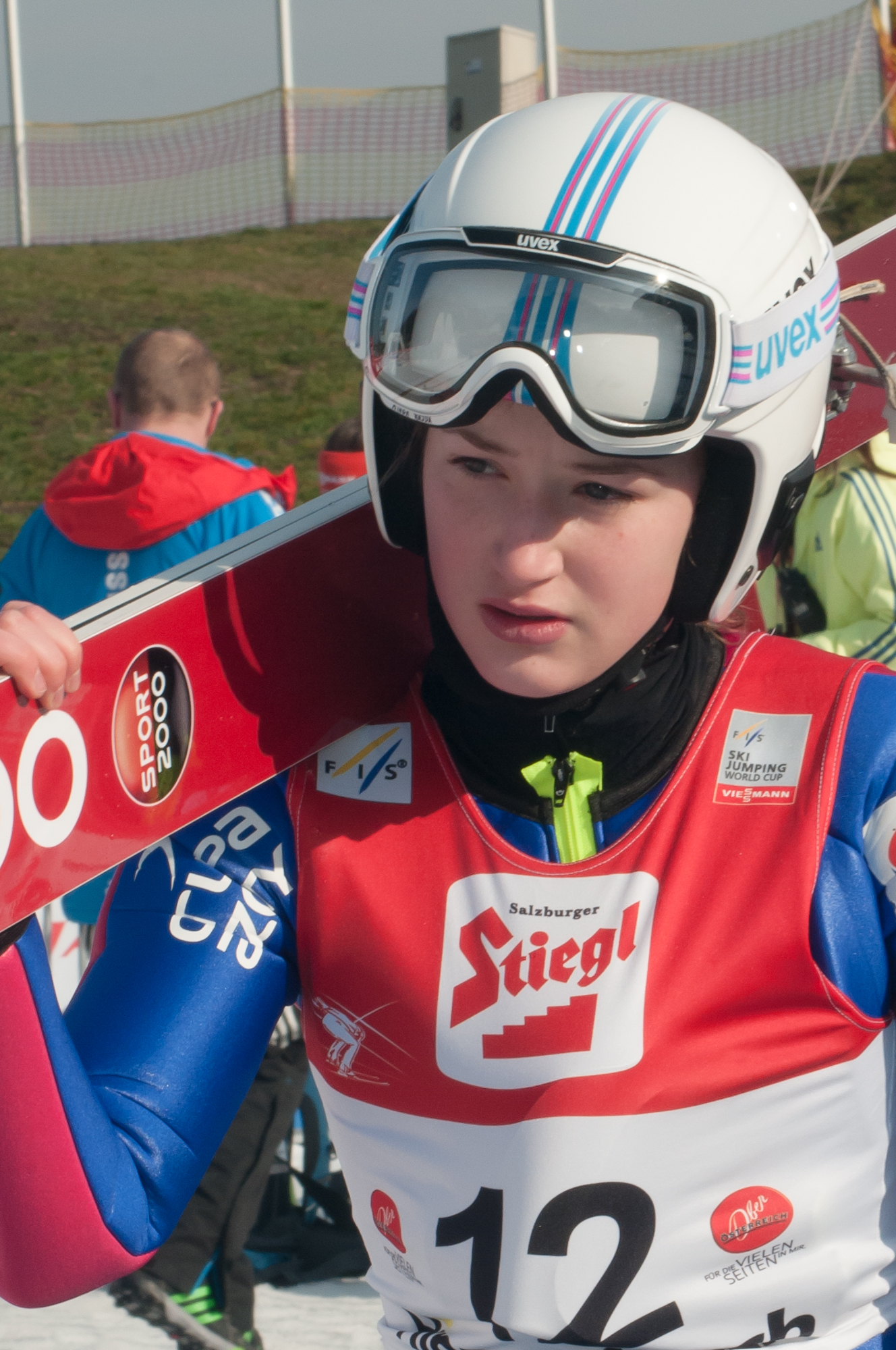
- Rajda in 2015

Personal information
- Nationality: Poland
- Born: 22 December 2000 (age 25) Szczyrk, Poland

Sport
- Sport: Skiing
- Club: SSR LZS Sokół Szczyrk

World Cup career
- Seasons: 2016–present
- Indiv. starts: 6
Medal record
Winter Universiade
Bronze medal – third place	2023 Lake Placid	Individual
Bronze medal – third place	2023 Lake Placid	Mixed events
- Updated on 19 January 2023

Kinga Rajda (born 22 December 2000) is a Polish ski jumper. She is a member of the national team, a two-time Polish Champion (2015, 2016) and competed at the 2019 World Championships.

On 30 January 2016 in Oberstdorf, after jumping to 86.5 and 83.0 meters, she took 30th place in the World Cup competition, thus becoming the second female Polish ski jumper in history (after Magdalena Pałasz), who scored points in this competition.

On 2 March 2019, she took part in the mixed team, alongside Kamil Stoch, Dawid Kubacki and Kamila Karpiel, at the 2019 World Championships, it was Poland's debut in the mixed team at World Championships. The Polish mixed team was surprisingly in third after the first round and took 6th place at the end.

== World Championships ==
Place	Day	Year	Locality	Hill	Point K	HS	Competition	Jump 1	Jump 2	Note (points)	Loss (points)	Winner
34.	27 February	2019	Seefeld	Toni-Seelos-Olympiaschanze	K-99	HS-109	individual	91.0 m	—	90.8	168.8	Maren Lundby
6.	2 March	2019	Seefeld	Toni-Seelos-Olympiaschanze	K-99	HS-109	mixed team	91.5 m	97.0 m	914.9 (194.1)	97.3	Germany

== World Junior Championships ==
Place	Day	Year	Locality	Hill	Point K	HS	Competition	Jump 1	Jump 2	Note (points)	Loss (points)	Winner
12.	23 February	2016	Râșnov	Râșnov Ski Jump	K-90	HS-100	individual	77.5 m	86.0 m	164.8	44.2	Chiara Hölzl
11.	24 February	2016	Râșnov	Râșnov Ski Jump	K-90	HS-100	mixed team	83.0 m	—	332.1 (88.2)	550.7	Slovenia
13.	1 February	2017	Park City	Utah Olympic Park Jumps	K-90	HS-100	individual	80.5 m	84.0 m	195.6	44.2	Manuela Malsiner
7.	5 February	2017	Park City	Utah Olympic Park Jumps	K-90	HS-100	mixed team	87.0 m	77.0 m	778.2 (178.9)	147.1	Slovenia
48.	2 February	2018	Kandersteg	Lötschberg-Schanze	K-95	HS-106	individual	63.5 m	—	38.4	224.2	Nika Križnar
9.	3 February	2018	Kandersteg	Lötschberg-Schanze	K-95	HS-106	team	81.5 m	—	163.5 (52.8)	569.6	Slovenia
8.	4 February	2018	Kandersteg	Lötschberg-Schanze	K-95	HS-106	mixed team	77.0 m	75.0 m	615.6 (122.1)	253.7	Norway

== World Cup ==
=== Season standings ===
Season	Overall
2015–16	53
2016–17	–
2017–18	–
2018–19	

== Continental Cup ==
=== Season standings ===
Season	Overall
2014–15	32
2017–18	31
