= Rinat Mukhin =

Kazakhstani cross-country skier (born 1994)

Personal information
- Full name: Rinat Mukhin
- Born: 29 January 1994 (age 32)

Sport
- Sport: Skiing
Medal record
Men's cross-country skiing
Representing Kazakhstan

Rinat Mukhin (Ринат Александрович Мухин, born 29 January 1994) is a Kazakhstani cross-country skier.

He represented Kazakhstan at the FIS Nordic World Ski Championships 2015 in Falun.
