= Iga Wojtasik =

Polish speed skater (born 2000)

Personal information
- Born: 28 June 2000 (age 26) Elbląg, Poland

Sport
- Country: Poland
- Sport: Speed skating
Medal record
Women's speed skating
Representing Poland
World Single Distances Championships
Bronze medal – third place	2024 Calgary	Team sprint
European Championships
Silver medal – second place	2024 Heerenveen	Team sprint
World University Games
Gold medal – first place	2023 Lake Placid	Team pursuit
Silver medal – second place	2023 Lake Placid	1000 m

Iga Wojtasik (born 28 June 2000) is a Polish speed skater. She is a medalist at the World Single Distances Championships and the European Championships.

== Career ==
In the 2021/22 season, Wojtasik became Polish champion in the team race and team sprint, and won the team pursuit at the World University Championships in Lake Placid. A year later, she competed for the first time at the European Championships in Hamar, where she finished 13th in the sprint total, followed by silver in the 1000 m and gold in the team race at the Winter Universiade in Lake Placid.

At the 2024 World Single Distance Championships in Calgary, Wojtasik won a bronze medal in the team sprint. She also won a silver medal in the team sprint at the 2024 European Speed Skating Championships in Heerenveen. She finished seventh in the 500 m race there. In 2024, Wojtasik took part in the World Sprint Speed Skating Championships in Inzell, where she finished the competition in 16th position.
