= Kendall Kramer =

American cross-country skier (born 2002)

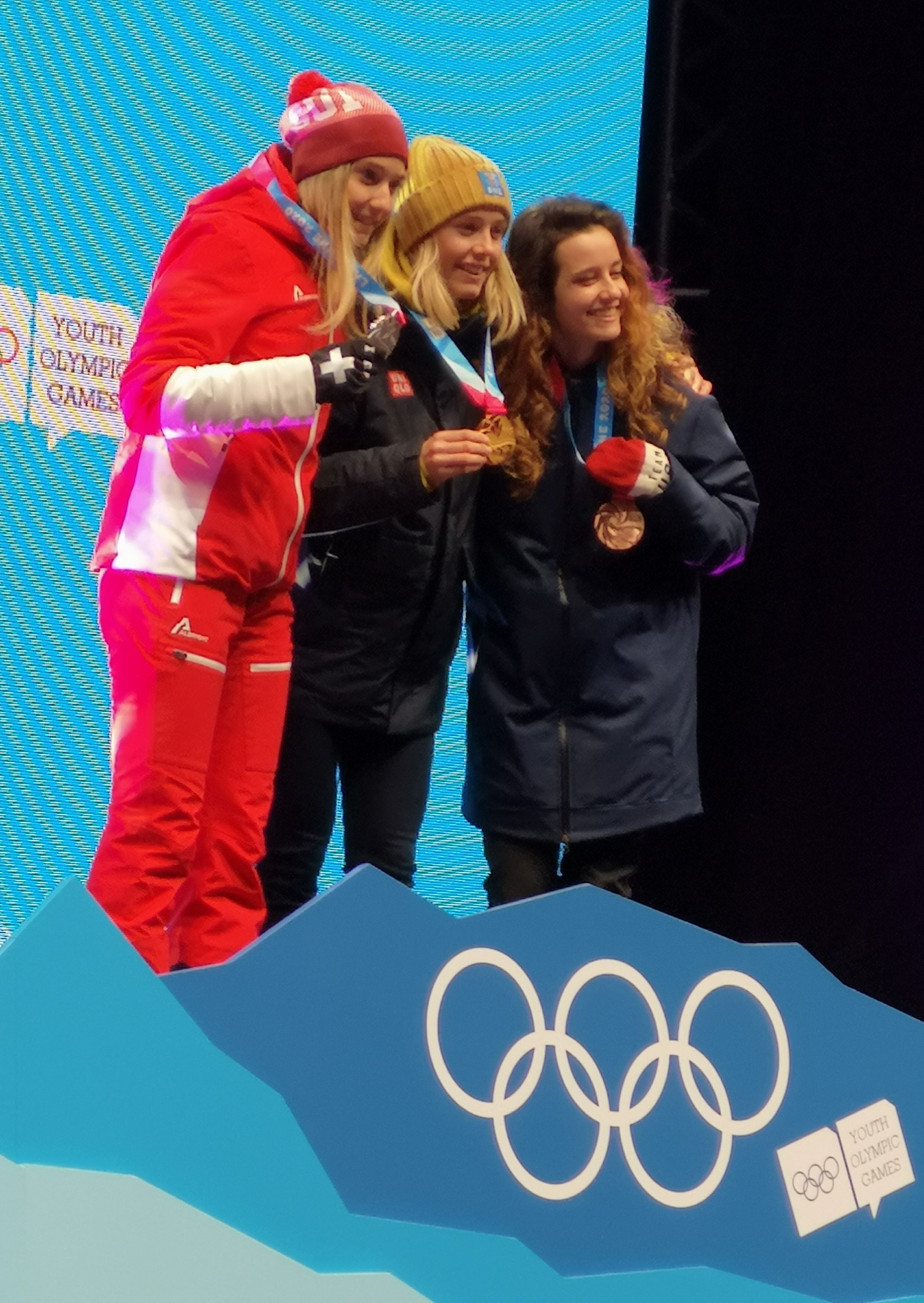
- Kramer (right) with Märta Rosenberg and Siri Wigger in 2020

Personal information
- Born: June 26, 2002 (age 24) Fairbanks, Alaska, U.S.

Sport
- Country: United States
- Sport: Skiing
- Club: Alaska Pacific University Nordic Ski Center
Medal record
Women's cross-country skiing
Representing United States
World University Games
Silver medal – second place	2023 Lake Placid	15 km freestyle
Youth Olympic Games
Bronze medal – third place	2020 Lausanne	5 km classical
Junior World Championships
Silver medal – second place	2020 Oberwiesenthal	4 × 3.33 km relay

Kendall Kramer (born June 26, 2002) is an American cross-country skier. She represented the United States in cross-country skiing at the 2026 Winter Olympics.

== Early life and education ==
Born and raised in Fairbanks, Alaska, Kramer attended West Valley High School. She began cross-country skiing in seventh grade and competed at West Valley High School in cross country, Nordic skiing, and track and field, where she was a 14-time state champion. Kramer majored in psychology at the University of Alaska Fairbanks, graduating in 2025.

== Career ==
As a U18, Kramer represented the United States at the 2019 Junior World Championships in Lahti, Finland, where she finished fourth in the individual classic, her first-ever 15 km race. Later that year, Kramer swept the individual races the 2019 U.S. Cross Country Junior National Championships in Anchorage, Alaska, placing first in the individual freestyle, the sprint classic and the mass start classic. She made her World Cup debut in March 2019 in Quebec City, where she skied all three races in the 2018–19 FIS Cross-Country World Cup Finals.

At the 2020 Winter Youth Olympic Games in Lausanne, Switzerland, Kramer earned a bronze medal in the 5 km individual classic race. Kramer won a silver medal as part of the 4 × 3.3 km women's relay team at the 2020 Nordic Junior World Ski Championships in Oberwiesenthal, Germany.

== Cross-country skiing results ==
All results are sourced from the International Ski Federation (FIS).

=== Olympic Games ===
Year	Age	Individual	Skiathlon	Mass start	Sprint	Relay	Team sprint
2026	23	38	—	26	—	—	—

=== World Championships ===
Year	Age	Individual	Skiathlon	Mass start	Sprint	Relay	Team sprint
2025	22	—	—	—	—	—	—
