= Cross-country skiing at the 2023 Winter World University Games =

Cross-country skiing at the Lake Placid 2023 FISU World University Games
- Venue: Lake Placid Olympic Sports Complex Cross Country Biathlon Center
- Dates: 15–22 January 2023

Cross-country skiing at the 2023 Winter World University Games was held at the Lake Placid Olympic Sports Complex Cross Country Biathlon Center from 15 to 22 January 2023.

== Men's events ==
Event	Gold		Silver		Bronze	
10 kilometre classical	Ryo Hirose; Japan	24:37.0	Magnus Bøe; Norway	24:52.8	Andreas Kirkeng; Norway	24:54.6
10 kilometre freestyle pursuit	Ryo Hirose; Japan	22:44.9; 47:21.9	Andreas Kirkeng; Norway	22:36.9; 47:30.9	John Hagenbuch; United States	22:21.2; 47:35.2
30 kilometre freestyle	John Hagenbuch; United States	1:12:48.8	Magnus Bøe; Norway	1:12:51.3	Luca Compagnoni; Italy	1:12:52.9
4 × 7.5 kilometre relay	France; Gianni Giachino; Mattéo Correia; Simon Chappaz; Tom Mancini	1:17:01.5	Norway; Fredrik Lütcherath Nilsen; Magnus Bøe; Øyvind Haugan; Andreas Kirkeng	1:17:29.8	Japan; Shota Moriguchi; Yoshiki Hoshino; Yuito Habuki; Ryo Hirose	1:17:56.7
Sprint freestyle	Verneri Poikonen; Finland	2:34.74	Jaume Pueyo; Spain	2:35.27	Tom Mancini; France	2:35.93

== Women's events ==
Event	Gold		Silver		Bronze	
5 kilometre classical	Hilla Niemelä; Finland	13:20.8	Mariel Merlii Pulles; Estonia	13:38.2	Maria Eugenia Boccardi; Italy	13:43.0
5 kilometre freestyle pursuit	Hilla Niemelä; Finland	12:27.8; 25:47.8	Mariel Merlii Pulles; Estonia	12:17.6; 25:55.6	Maria Eugenia Boccardi; Italy	12:18.6; 26:01.6
15 kilometre freestyle	Mariel Merlii Pulles; Estonia	39:38.4	Kendall Kramer; United States	39:38.8	Xeniya Shalygina; Kazakhstan	39:50.1
3 × 5 kilometre relay	Finland; Tiia Olkkonen; Vilja Kauranen; Hilla Niemelä	43:49.6	Norway; Astrid Stav; Selma Andersen; Karianne Olsvik Dengerud	43:50.3	Kazakhstan; Aisha Rakisheva; Nadezhda Stepashkina; Xeniya Shalygina	44:02.0
Sprint freestyle	Mariel Merlii Pulles; Estonia	2:54.57	Tiia Olkkonen; Finland	2:55.20	Anna-Maria Dietze; Germany	2:55.50

== Mixed event ==
Event	Gold		Silver		Bronze	
Mixed team sprint classical	Japan; Ryo Hirose; Rin Sobue	20:42.85	United States; Finn Sweet; Renae Anderson	20:51.87	Norway; Andreas Kirkeng; Karianne Olsvik Dengerud	20:55.61

== Medal table ==
* Host nation (United States)

Rank	Nation	Gold	Silver	Bronze	Total
1	Finland	4	1	0	5
2	Japan	3	0	1	4
3	Estonia	2	2	0	4
4	United States*	1	2	1	4
5	France	1	0	1	2
6	Norway	0	5	2	7
7	Spain	0	1	0	1
8	Italy	0	0	3	3
9	Kazakhstan	0	0	2	2
10	Germany	0	0	1	1
Totals (10 entries)		11	11	11	33

== Participating nations ==
A total of 172 athletes (91 men and 81 women) competed from 28 countries.

- Argentina (1)
- Armenia (1)
- Australia (9)
- Brazil (1)
- Canada (12)
- Croatia (1)
- Czech Republic (7)
- Estonia (3)
- Finland (11)
- France (8)
- Germany (11)
- Haiti (1)
- Iceland (2)
- Italy (8)
- Japan (8)
- Kazakhstan (14)
- Mongolia (3)
- Netherlands (1)
- Norway (11)
- Poland (7)
- Slovakia (6)
- Slovenia (1)
- South Korea (6)
- Spain (2)
- Switzerland (10)
- Thailand (2)
- Ukraine (9)
- United States (16)
