= Magnus Bøe =

South Korean-born Norwegian cross-country skier

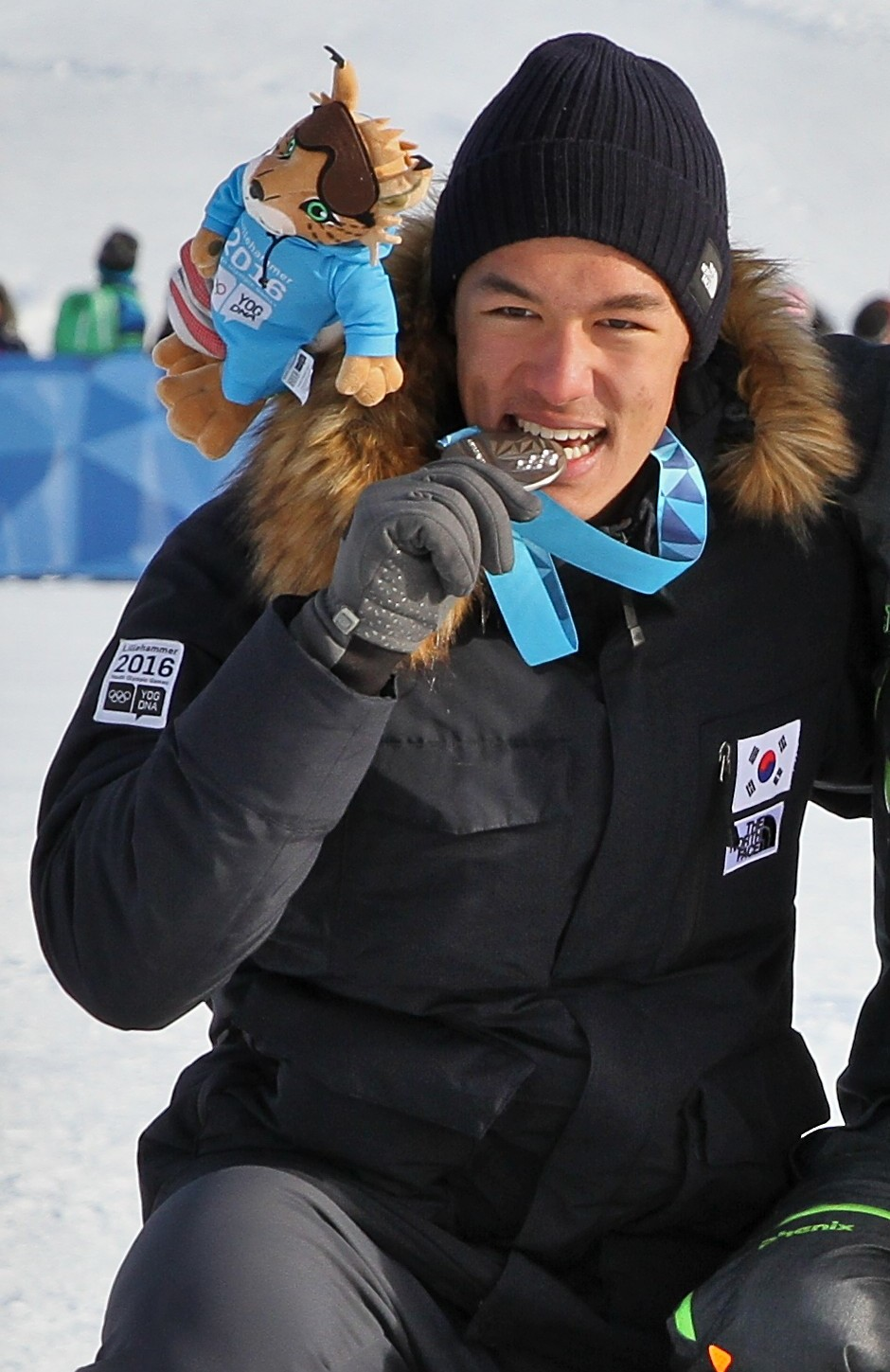
- Bøe after winning silver medal at the 2016 Winter Youth Olympics in Lillehammer

Personal information
- Nationality: Norway; South Korea
- Born: 21 July 1998 (age 28) Busan, South Korea

Sport
- Sport: Skiing
- Club: Fossum IF

World Cup career
- Seasons: 2016–2018
- Indiv. starts: 21
- Indiv. podiums: 0
- Team starts: 0
- Overall titles: 0 – (113th in 2018)
- Discipline titles: 0
Medal record
Men's cross-country skiing
Representing Norway
Winter Universiade
Silver medal – second place	2023 Lake Placid	10 km classical
Silver medal – second place	2023 Lake Placid	30 km freestyle
Silver medal – second place	2023 Lake Placid	4 × 7.5 km relay
Representing South Korea
Asian Winter Games
Gold medal – first place	2017 Sapporo	Individual sprint
Silver medal – second place	2017 Sapporo	10 km classical
Bronze medal – third place	2017 Sapporo	4 × 7.5 km relay
Junior World Championships
Silver medal – second place	2016 Râșnov	10 km classical
Silver medal – second place	2016 Râșnov	Individual sprint
Winter Youth Olympic Games
Gold medal – first place	2016 Lillehammer	10 km freestyle
Gold medal – first place	2016 Lillehammer	Cross-country cross
Silver medal – second place	2016 Lillehammer	Individual sprint
- Updated on 20 November 2021

Magnus Bøe, also known as Kim Magnus (Korean: 킴매그너스; born 21 July 1998) is a South Korean-born Norwegian cross-country skier. He competed in the 2018 Winter Olympics.

== Personal life ==
Magnus was born in Busan, South Korea, to a Norwegian father and South Korean mother. The family settled in Bærum, Norway, where Magnus joined the skiing club Fossum IF.

With the 2018 Winter Olympics being held in his country of birth South Korea, Magnus realized that the competition in Norway was too tough for him to gain an Olympic spot at the age of 20. He declared his allegiance for South Korea already in 2016. He competed under the South Korean surname Kim. He went to school in Norway, the Norwegian School of Elite Sport at Geilo. On 19 May 2018 he changed his nationality back to Norway. He took a cross-country skiing scholarship with the University of Colorado.

== Career ==
His breakthrough came at the 2016 Winter Youth Olympics, where he won two gold medals in 10 kilometre freestyle and cross-country cross, and the silver medal in sprint. At the 2016 Junior World Championships he followed up with two silver medals in the 10 kilometres and the sprint.

He had made his Cross-Country Skiing World Cup in December 2015 in Lillehammer, finishing a lowly 66th. His first and only top-30 placements came in sprint events in March 2018, finishing 19th in Drammen and 27th in Falun.

In 2017 he won the sprint gold medal at the 2017 Asian Winter Games, following up with a 10 kilometre silver and a relay bronze.Official Results Book – Cross-country Skiing He competed in two events at the 2018 Junior World Championships, finishing no higher than 9th. Competing at the 2018 Olympics, he managed a 26th place in the team sprint as well as 42nd, 43rd and 47th places in the individual events.

Bøe also competed at the Biathlon Junior World Championships 2019, placing a lowly 66th.

== Cross-country skiing results ==
All results are sourced from the International Ski Federation (FIS).

=== Olympic Games ===
Year	Age	15 km individual	30 km skiathlon	50 km mass start	Sprint	4 × 10 km relay	Team sprint
2018	19	42	—	47	50	—	26

=== World Cup ===
==== Season standings ====
Season	Age	Discipline standings				Ski Tour standings			
Season	Age	Overall	Distance	Sprint	U23	Nordic Opening	Tour de Ski	World Cup Final	Ski Tour Canada
2016	17	NC	NC	NC	NC	—	—	—N/a	—
2017	18	NC	NC	NC	NC	77	—	—	—N/a
2018	19	113	NC	59	15	DNF	—	75	—N/a
