= 2020–21 FIS Nordic Combined World Cup =

International skiing competition

Nordic Combined World Cup 2020/21
Discipline	Men	Women
Overall	(Norway) Jarl Magnus Riiber (3)	(United States) Tara Geraghty-Moats (1)
Nations Cup	Germany (13)	Norway (1)
Best Jumper Trophy	(Norway) Jarl Magnus Riiber (2)	(Norway) Gyda Westvold Hansen (1)
Best Skier Trophy	(Finland) Ilkka Herola (2)	(United States) Tara Geraghty-Moats (1)

Stage events
Ruka Tour	(Norway) Jarl Magnus Riiber (2)	—
Triple	(Norway) Jarl Magnus Riiber (2)	—

Competition
Edition	38th	1st
Locations	7	1
Individual	15	1
Team	2	—
Cancelled	8	6

The 2020/21 FIS Nordic Combined World Cup, organized by the International Ski Federation was the 38th Nordic Combined World Cup season for men, and the 1st season for women. The men's competition started on 27 November 2020 in Ruka, Finland, and concluded on 21 March 2021 in Klingenthal, Germany. The women's inaugural competition started on 18 December 2020 in Ramsau, Austria.

== Calendar ==
=== Men ===
World Cup history in real time

Total	GUL	GUN	GU	Sp	MSS	Pen	Hsp	Csp	Winners
550	124	75	239	86	19	4	2	1	73

after GUL event in Klingenthal (21 March 2021)

Num	Season	Date	Place	Hill	Discipline	Winner	Second	Third	Yellow bib	Ref.
536	1	27 November 2020	(Finland) Ruka	Rukatunturi	HS142 / 5 km _{117}	(Norway) Jarl Magnus Riiber	(Austria) Johannes Lamparter	(Norway) Jens Lurås Oftebro	(Norway) Jarl Magnus Riiber	
537	2	28 November 2020	(Finland) Ruka	Rukatunturi	HS142 / 10 km _{118}	(Norway) Jarl Magnus Riiber	(Germany) Eric Frenzel	(Japan) Akito Watabe	(Norway) Jarl Magnus Riiber	
538	3	29 November 2020	(Finland) Ruka	Rukatunturi	HS142 / 10 km _{119}	(Norway) Jens Lurås Oftebro	(Germany) Fabian Rießle	(Germany) Manuel Faißt	(Norway) Jarl Magnus Riiber	
3rd Ruka Tour (26–29 November 2020)						(Norway) Jarl Magnus Riiber	(Norway) Jens Lurås Oftebro	(Austria) Johannes Lamparter		
		5 December 2020	(Norway) Lillehammer	Lysgårdsbakken	HS98 / 10 km	Cancelled due to the COVID-19 pandemic				
		6 December 2020	(Norway) Lillehammer	Lysgårdsbakken	HS140 / 10 km	Cancelled due to the COVID-19 pandemic				
539	4	19 December 2020	(Austria) Ramsau	W90-Mattensprunganlage	HS98 / 10 km _{69}	(Germany) Vinzenz Geiger	(Norway) Jarl Magnus Riiber	(Austria) Lukas Greiderer	(Norway) Jarl Magnus Riiber	
540	5	20 December 2020	(Austria) Ramsau	W90-Mattensprunganlage	HS98 / 10 km _{70}	(Germany) Vinzenz Geiger	(Norway) Jarl Magnus Riiber	(Germany) Fabian Rießle	(Norway) Jarl Magnus Riiber	
		2 January 2021	(Estonia) Otepää	Tehvandi	HS97 / 10 km	Cancelled due to the COVID-19 pandemic				
		3 January 2021	(Estonia) Otepää	Tehvandi	HS97 / 10 km	Cancelled due to the COVID-19 pandemic				
541	6	15 January 2021	(Italy) Val di Fiemme	Trampolino dal Ben	HS106 / 10 km _{71}	(Norway) Jarl Magnus Riiber	(Finland) Ilkka Herola	(Germany) Vinzenz Geiger	(Norway) Jarl Magnus Riiber	
542	7	17 January 2021	(Italy) Val di Fiemme	Trampolino dal Ben	HS106 / 10 km _{72}	(Norway) Jarl Magnus Riiber	(Germany) Eric Frenzel	(Germany) Vinzenz Geiger	(Norway) Jarl Magnus Riiber	
543	8	24 January 2021	(Finland) Lahti	Salpausselkä	HS130 / 10 km _{120}	(Japan) Akito Watabe	(Norway) Jarl Magnus Riiber	(Japan) Ryōta Yamamoto	(Norway) Jarl Magnus Riiber	
544	9	29 January 2021	(Austria) Seefeld	Toni-Seelos-Olympiaschanze	HS109 / 5 km _{73}	(Norway) Jarl Magnus Riiber	(Japan) Akito Watabe	(Germany) Vinzenz Geiger	(Norway) Jarl Magnus Riiber	
545	10	30 January 2021	(Austria) Seefeld	Toni-Seelos-Olympiaschanze	HS109 / 10 km _{74}	(Norway) Jarl Magnus Riiber	(Japan) Akito Watabe	(Finland) Ilkka Herola	(Norway) Jarl Magnus Riiber	
546	11	31 January 2021	(Austria) Seefeld	Toni-Seelos-Olympiaschanze	HS109 / 15 km _{75}	(Norway) Jarl Magnus Riiber	(Finland) Ilkka Herola	(Japan) Akito Watabe	(Norway) Jarl Magnus Riiber	
8th Nordic Combined Triple (29–31 January 2021)
547	12	6 February 2021	(Germany) Klingenthal	Vogtland Arena	HS140 / 10 km _{121}	(Germany) Vinzenz Geiger	(Germany) Fabian Rießle	(Germany) Eric Frenzel	(Norway) Jarl Magnus Riiber	
548	13	7 February 2021	(Germany) Klingenthal	Vogtland Arena	HS140 / 10 km _{122}	(Germany) Vinzenz Geiger	(Japan) Akito Watabe	(Austria) Lukas Greiderer	(Norway) Jarl Magnus Riiber	
		13 February 2021	(China) Beijing	Kuyangshu	HS140 / 10 km	Cancelled due to the COVID-19 pandemic; moved to Lillehammer				
		13 February 2021	(Norway) Lillehammer	Lysgårdsbakken	HS98 / 10 km	Cancelled due to the COVID-19 pandemic				
		14 February 2021	(Norway) Lillehammer	Lysgårdsbakken	HS140 / 10 km	Cancelled due to the COVID-19 pandemic				
FIS Nordic World Ski Championships 2021 (22 February – 7 March)
		13 March 2021	(Norway) Oslo	Holmenkollbakken	HS134 / 10 km	Cancelled due to the COVID-19 pandemic				
		14 March 2021	(Norway) Oslo	Holmenkollbakken	HS134 / 10 km	Cancelled due to the COVID-19 pandemic				
		20 March 2021	(Germany) Schonach	Langenwaldschanze	HS106 / 10 km	Cancelled due to the lack of snow; moved to Klingenthal				
		21 March 2021	(Germany) Schonach	Langenwaldschanze	HS106 / 15 km	Cancelled due to the lack of snow; moved to Klingenthal				
549	14	20 March 2021	(Germany) Klingenthal	Vogtland Arena	HS140 / 10 km _{123}	(Norway) Jarl Magnus Riiber	(Japan) Akito Watabe	(Austria) Johannes Lamparter	(Norway) Jarl Magnus Riiber	
550	15	21 March 2021	(Germany) Klingenthal	Vogtland Arena	HS140 / 10 km _{124}	(Norway) Jarl Magnus Riiber	(Norway) Espen Bjørnstad	(Germany) Fabian Rießle	(Norway) Jarl Magnus Riiber	

=== Women ===
World Cup history in real time

Total	Gundersen	Winners
1	1	1

after Gundersen event in Ramsau (18 December 2020)

Num	Season	Date	Place	Hill	Discipline	Winner	Second	Third	Yellow bib	Ref.
		4 December 2020	(Norway) Lillehammer	Lysgårdsbakken	HS98 / 5 km	Cancelled due to the COVID-19 pandemic				
		5 December 2020	(Norway) Lillehammer	Lysgårdsbakken	HS98 / 5 km	Cancelled due to the COVID-19 pandemic				
1	1	18 December 2020	(Austria) Ramsau	W90-Mattensprunganlage	HS98 / 5 km _{1}	(United States) Tara Geraghty-Moats	(Norway) Gyda Westvold Hansen	(Japan) Anju Nakamura	(United States) Tara Geraghty-Moats	
		2 January 2021	(Estonia) Otepää	Tehvandi	HS97 / 5 km	Cancelled due to the COVID-19 pandemic				
		3 January 2021	(Estonia) Otepää	Tehvandi	HS97 / 5 km	Cancelled due to the COVID-19 pandemic				
		12 February 2021	(Norway) Lillehammer	Lysgårdsbakken	HS98 / 5 km	Cancelled due to the COVID-19 pandemic				
		13 February 2021	(Norway) Lillehammer	Lysgårdsbakken	HS98 / 5 km	Cancelled due to the COVID-19 pandemic				
FIS Nordic World Ski Championships 2021 (22 February – 7 March)

=== Men's team ===
World Cup history in real time

Total	Relay	Sprint	Mass Start	Winners
46	24	20	2	5

after Sprint event in Lahti (23 January 2021)

Num	Season	Date	Place	Hill	Discipline	Winner	Second	Third	Yellow bib	Ref.
45	1	16 January 2021	(Italy) Val di Fiemme	Trampolino dal Ben	HS106 / 2x7.5 km Sprint _{19}	Germany I Eric Frenzel; Fabian Rießle	Austria I Johannes Lamparter; Lukas Greiderer	Finland I Ilkka Herola; Eero Hirvonen	Germany	
46	2	23 January 2021	(Finland) Lahti	Salpausselkä	HS130 / 2x7.5 km Sprint _{20}	Norway I Jørgen Graabak; Jarl Magnus Riiber	Germany I Fabian Rießle; Vinzenz Geiger	Japan I Ryōta Yamamoto; Akito Watabe	Germany	
		14 February 2021	(China) Beijing	Kuyangshu	HS 140 / 4x5 km Relay	Cancelled due to the COVID-19 pandemic				
FIS Nordic World Ski Championships 2021 (22 February – 7 March)

== Men's standings ==
=== Overall ===
Rank	after all 15 events	Points
	(Norway) Jarl Magnus Riiber	1140
2	(Germany) Vinzenz Geiger	810
3	(Japan) Akito Watabe	757
4	(Germany) Fabian Rießle	687
5	(Germany) Eric Frenzel	608
6	(Austria) Johannes Lamparter	602
7	(Finland) Ilkka Herola	594
8	(Norway) Jens Lurås Oftebro	491
9	(Austria) Lukas Greiderer	425
10	(Germany) Manuel Faißt	425

=== Best Jumper Trophy ===
Rank	after all 15 events	Points
	(Norway) Jarl Magnus Riiber	1010
2	(Japan) Ryōta Yamamoto	822
3	(Japan) Akito Watabe	792
4	(Austria) Johannes Lamparter	604
5	(Germany) Manuel Faißt	524
6	(Japan) Yoshito Watabe	509
7	(France) Laurent Muhlethaler	491
8	(Germany) Terence Weber	461
9	(Germany) Fabian Rießle	432
10	(Austria) Lukas Greiderer	390

=== Best Skier Trophy ===
Rank	after all 15 events	Points
	(Finland) Ilkka Herola	1126
2	(Norway) Jørgen Graabak	979
3	(Germany) Vinzenz Geiger	803
4	(Germany) Fabian Rießle	596
5	(Germany) Eric Frenzel	586
6	(Finland) Eero Hirvonen	562
7	(Germany) Johannes Rydzek	536
8	(Norway) Jens Lurås Oftebro	463
9	(United States) Taylor Fletcher	423
10	(Austria) Lukas Greiderer	379

=== Nations Cup ===
Rank	after all 17 events	Points
	Germany	3597
2	Norway	3127
3	Austria	2166
4	Japan	1552
5	Finland	1043
6	Italy	412
7	France	312
8	Estonia	187
9	Czech Republic	96
10	United States	81

=== Prize money ===
Rank	after all 21 events	CHF
1	(Norway) Jarl Magnus Riiber	118.640
2	(Germany) Vinzenz Geiger	63.165
3	(Japan) Akito Watabe	50.677
4	(Germany) Fabian Rießle	47.391
5	(Germany) Eric Frenzel	39.560
6	(Finland) Ilkka Herola	37.210
7	(Austria) Johannes Lamparter	34.960
8	(Norway) Jens Lurås Oftebro	28.440
9	(Austria) Lukas Greiderer	21.998
10	(Norway) Jørgen Graabak	18.630

== Women's standings ==
=== Overall ===
Rank	after all 1 event	Points
	(United States) Tara Geraghty-Moats	100
2	(Norway) Gyda Westvold Hansen	80
3	(Japan) Anju Nakamura	60
4	(Norway) Marte Leinan Lund	50
5	(Austria) Sigrun Kleinrath	45
6	(Austria) Lisa Hirner	40
7	(Norway) Mari Leinan Lund	36
8	(Italy) Veronica Gianmoena	32
9	(Italy) Annika Sieff	29
10	(Russia) Anastasia Goncharova	26

=== Best Jumper Trophy ===
Rank	after all 1 event	Points
	(Norway) Gyda Westvold Hansen	100
2	(Italy) Veronica Gianmoena	80
3	(Japan) Anju Nakamura	60
4	(Austria) Claudia Purker	50
5	(Austria) Sigrun Kleinrath	45
6	(United States) Tara Geraghty-Moats	40
7	(Italy) Annika Sieff	36
8	(Austria) Lisa Hirner	32
9	(Italy) Daniela Dejori	29
10	(Norway) Mari Leinan Lund	26

=== Best Skier Trophy ===
Rank	after all 1 event	Points
	(United States) Tara Geraghty-Moats	100
2	(Japan) Anju Nakamura	80
3	(Norway) Gyda Westvold Hansen	60
4	(Norway) Marte Leinan Lund	50
5	(Russia) Anastasia Goncharova	45
6	(Norway) Hanna Midtsundstad	40
7	(Austria) Lisa Hirner	36
8	(Austria) Sigrun Kleinrath	32
9	(Norway) Mari Leinan Lund	29
10	(Japan) Ayane Miyazaki	26

=== Nations Cup ===
Rank	after all 1 event	Points
	Norway	166
2	United States	105
3	Austria	97
4	Japan	92
5	Italy	83
6	Russia	48
7	Germany	41
8	Slovenia	19
9	France	9

=== Prize money ===
Rank	after all 1 payout	CHF
1	(United States) Tara Geraghty-Moats	2,800
2	(Norway) Gyda Westvold Hansen	2,000
3	(Japan) Anju Nakamura	1,450
4	(Norway) Marte Leinan Lund	1,100
5	(Austria) Sigrun Kleinrath	850
6	(Austria) Lisa Hirner	600
7	(Norway) Mari Leinan Lund	450
8	(Italy) Veronica Gianmoena	350
9	(Italy) Annika Sieff	250
10	(Russia) Anastasia Goncharova	150

== Provisional Rounds ==
=== Men ===
No.	Place	Provisional Round	Competition	Size	Winner
1	(Finland) Ruka	26 November 2020	27, 28, 29 November 2020	LH	(Germany) Manuel Faißt
2	(Austria) Ramsau	18 December 2020	19, 20 December 2020	NH	(Norway) Jarl Magnus Riiber
3	(Italy) Val di Fiemme	14 January 2021	15, 17 January 2021	NH	(Japan) Akito Watabe
4	(Finland) Lahti	22 January 2021	23 January 2021	LH	(Japan) Ryōta Yamamoto
5	(Austria) Seefeld	29 January 2021		NH	(Norway) Jarl Magnus Riiber
6	(Austria) Seefeld	30 January 2021	30, 31 January 2021	NH	(Norway) Jarl Magnus Riiber
7	(Germany) Klingenthal	5 February 2021	6, 7 February 2021	LH	(Japan) Ryōta Yamamoto
8	(Germany) Klingenthal	20 March 2021	20, 21 March 2021	LH	(Japan) Akito Watabe

=== Women ===
No.	Place	Provisional Round	Competition	Size	Winner
1	(Austria) Ramsau	17 December 2020	18 December 2020	NH	(Italy) Annika Sieff

== Points distribution ==
The table shows the number of points won in the 2020/21 FIS Nordic Combined World Cup for men and women.

Place	1	2	3	4	5	6	7	8	9	10	11	12	13	14	15	16	17	18	19	20	21	22	23	24	25	26	27	28	29	30
Individual	100	80	60	50	45	40	36	32	29	26	24	22	20	18	16	15	14	13	12	11	10	9	8	7	6	5	4	3	2	1
Nordic Combined Triple – Days 1 & 2	50	40	30	25	23	20	18	16	15	13	12	11	10	9	8	8	7	7	6	6	5	5	4	4	3	3	2	2	1	1
Nordic Combined Triple – Day 3	200	160	120	100	90	80	72	64	58	52	48	44	40	36	32	30	29	26	24	22	20	18	16	14	12	10	8	6	4	2
Team Sprint	200	175	150	125	100	75	50	25

== Achievements ==
First World Cup career victory

Men

- (Norway) Jens Lurås Oftebro – 20, (4th season) – the WC 3 in Ruka; first podium was 2019–20 WC 1 in Ruka

Women

- (United States) Tara Geraghty-Moats – 27, (1st season) – the WC 1 in Ramsau; it also was her first podium

First World Cup podium

Men

- (Austria) Johannes Lamparter – 19, (3rd season) – no. 2 in the WC 1 in Ruka
- (Japan) Ryōta Yamamoto – 23, (5th season) – no. 3 in the WC 8 in Lahti

Women

- (United States) Tara Geraghty-Moats – 27, (1st season) – no. 1 in the WC 1 in Ramsau
- (Norway) Gyda Westvold Hansen – 18, (1st season) – no. 2 in the WC 1 in Ramsau
- (Japan) Anju Nakamura – 20, (1st season) – no. 3 in the WC 1 in Ramsau

Number of wins this season (in brackets are all-time wins)

Men

- (Norway) Jarl Magnus Riiber, 9 (36) first places
- (Germany) Vinzenz Geiger, 4 (7) first places
- (Japan) Akito Watabe, 1 (19) first place
- (Norway) Jens Lurås Oftebro, 1 (1) first place

Women

- (United States) Tara Geraghty-Moats, 1 (1) first place

== Retirements ==
Following are notable Nordic combined skiers who announced their retirement:

=== Men ===
- (Austria) Bernhard Gruber
- (Norway) Magnus Krog

=== Women ===
- (United States) Tara Geraghty-Moats
