= Nordic combined at the 2023 Winter World University Games =

Nordic combined at the Lake Placid 2023 FISU World University Games
- Venue: Lake Placid Olympic Ski Jumping Complex (ski jumping); Lake Placid Olympic Sports Complex Cross Country Biathlon Center (cross-country skiing)
- Dates: 13–19 January

Nordic combined at the 2023 Winter World University Games was held at the Lake Placid Olympic Ski Jumping Complex & Lake Placid Olympic Sports Complex Cross Country Biathlon Center from 13–19 January. This was the first time that the women's events were held in a World Winter World University Games.

== Men's events ==
Event	Gold		Silver		Bronze	
Individual normal hill/10 km	Sakutaro Kobayashi; Japan	24:52.2	Niklas Malacinski; United States	26:28.6	Rasmus Ähtävä; Finland	26:35.2
Individual mass start 10 km/normal hill	Sakutaro Kobayashi; Japan	124.6	Niklas Malacinski; United States	119.2	Evan Nichols; United States	105.7
Team sprint normal hill/2 × 4 × 1.5 km	United States I Evan Nichols; Niklas Malacinski	24:51.1	Japan I Takuya Nakazawa; Sakutaro Kobayashi	24:58.5	Ukraine; Dmytro Mazurchuk; Vitalii Hrebeniuk	25:33.2

== Women's events ==
Event	Gold		Silver		Bronze	
Individual normal hill/5 km	Haruka Kasai; Japan	14:34.6	Yuna Kasai; Japan	15:23.4	Ayane Miyazaki; Japan	16:42.5
Individual mass start 5 km/normal hill	Yuna Kasai; Japan	122.2	Haruka Kasai; Japan	113.6	Joanna Kil; Poland	87.9

== Mixed event ==
Event	Gold		Silver		Bronze	
Team normal hill/2 × 2.5 km	Japan I Machiko Kubota; Sakutaro Kobayashi; Rin Sobue	12:14.7	Poland I Nicole Konderla; Andrzej Szczechowicz; Weronika Kaleta	12:55.2	United States I Cara Larson; Niklas Malacinski; Erin Bianco	13:03.2

== Medal table ==
* Host nation (United States)

Rank	Nation	Gold	Silver	Bronze	Total
1	Japan	5	3	1	9
2	United States*	1	2	2	5
3	Poland	0	1	1	2
4	Finland	0	0	1	1
4	Ukraine	0	0	1	1
Totals (5 entries)		6	6	6	18

== Participating nations ==
- Czech Republic (1)
- Finland (1)
- Japan (8)
- Kazakhstan (2)
- Poland (4)
- Ukraine (3)
- United States (5)
