= Mattéo Baud =

French cross-country skier (born 2002)

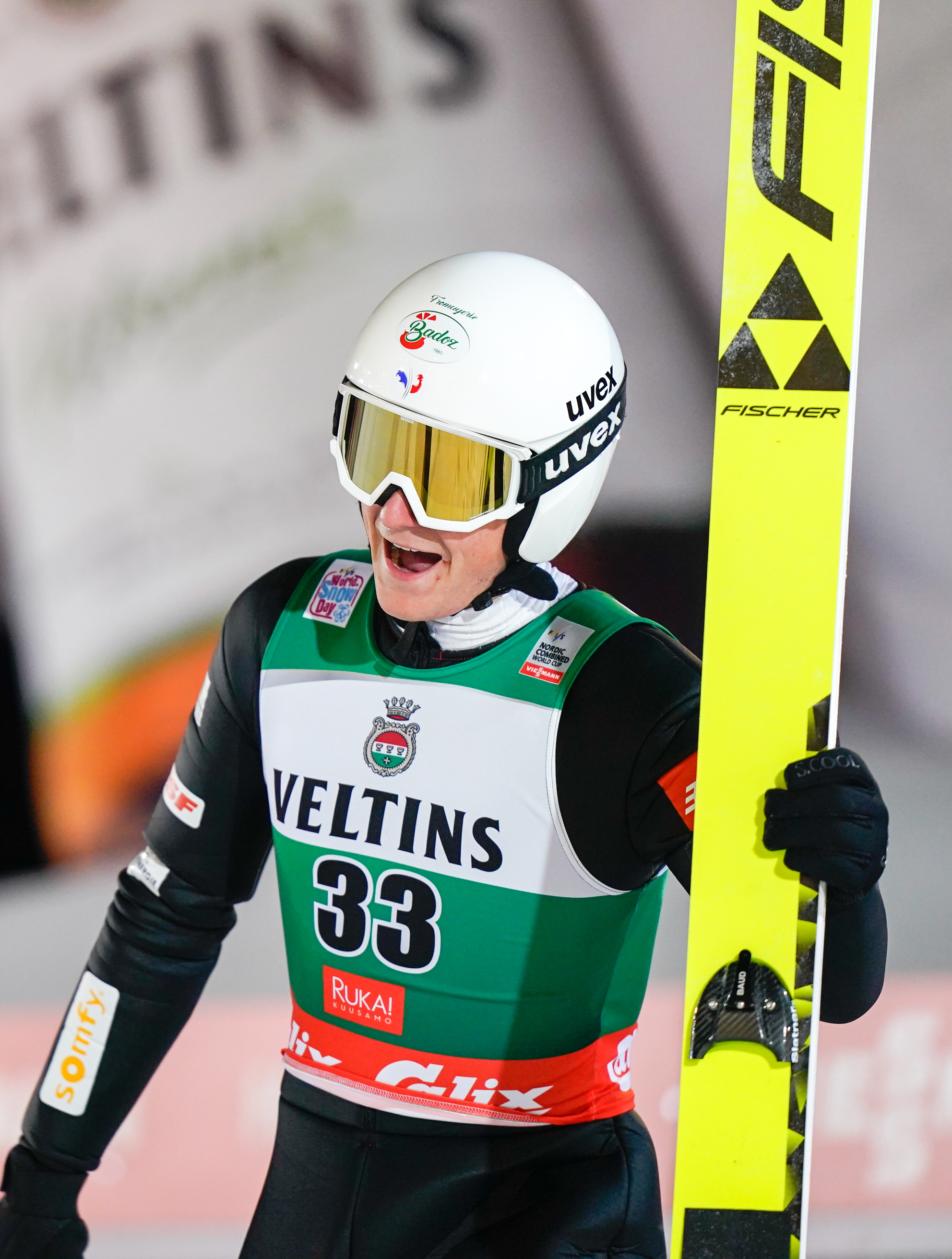
- Baud in 2020

Personal information
- Nationality: France
- Born: 26 June 2002 (age 24) Pontarlier, France

Sport
- Sport: Skiing
- Club: Olympique Mont d'Or

World Cup career
- Seasons: 4 – (2021–present)
- Indiv. starts: 53
- Indiv. podiums: 1
- Indiv. wins: 0
- Team podiums: 1
- Overall titles: 0 – (13th in 2023)
- Discipline titles: 0
Medal record
Men's Nordic combined
Representing France
Junior World Championships
Silver medal – second place	2020 Oberwiesenthal	Team NH
Silver medal – second place	2021 Lahti	Individual NH
- Updated on 7 December 2023

Mattéo Baud (born 26 June 2002) is a French Nordic combined skier. He competed in the individual normal hill, individual large hill and team large hill events at the 2022 Winter Olympics.
