= Ski jumping at the FIS Nordic World Ski Championships 2017 =

Ski jumping events at the 2017 FIS Nordic World Ski Championships in Lahti, Finland

Ski jumping at the FIS Nordic World Ski Championships 2017 was held from 23 February to 4 March 2017 in Lahti, Finland, as part of the FIS Nordic World Ski Championships 2017. All competitions took place at the Salpausselkä ski jumping complex, featuring three individual events (men's and women's on the HS 100 hill, and men's on the HS 130 hill) and two team events (men's team on the HS 130 hill and a mixed team event on the HS 100 hill).

Defending champions from the 2015 championships in Falun included Carina Vogt (women's individual on the normal hill), the Norwayn men's team (men's team on the large hill), and the German mixed team (mixed team on the normal hill). The men's individual defending champions, Rune Velta (normal hill) and Severin Freund (large hill), did not compete. Velta retired in the summer of 2016, and Freund was sidelined by an injury during the 2016/2017 season.

A total of 128 athletes (51 women and 77 men) from 23 national teams were registered, though 2 women and 11 men did not compete in any events. Notable returns included a Georgian athlete after a 24-year absence, and the Romanian team after a four-year break. Women's events saw debuts from Kazakhstan and Latvia, while a Turkish athlete debuted in the men's events. Absent from the previous championships were athletes from Greece, South Korea, Sweden, and Hungary.

In the women's individual event on the normal hill, Carina Vogt successfully defended her title, with Yuki Ito earning silver (as in 2015) and Sara Takanashi taking bronze.

In the men's individual event on the normal hill, Stefan Kraft won gold, followed by Andreas Wellinger (silver) and Markus Eisenbichler (bronze).

The mixed team event was won by the German team (Carina Vogt, Markus Eisenbichler, Svenja Würth, Andreas Wellinger), with Austria (Daniela Iraschko-Stolz, Michael Hayböck, Jacqueline Seifriedsberger, Stefan Kraft) taking silver, and Japan (Sara Takanashi, Taku Takeuchi, Yuki Ito, Daiki Ito) securing bronze.

The men's individual event on the large hill was also won by Stefan Kraft, with Andreas Wellinger again taking silver and Piotr Żyła earning bronze. Kraft's dual victories made him the fifth athlete in history to win both individual events at a single championship, joining Bjørn Wirkola, Gariy Napalkov, Hans-Georg Aschenbach, and Adam Małysz.

The men's team event on the large hill saw the Polish team (Piotr Żyła, Dawid Kubacki, Maciej Kot, Kamil Stoch) claim their first-ever world championship title. Norway (Anders Fannemel, Johann André Forfang, Daniel-André Tande, Andreas Stjernen) took silver, and Austria (Michael Hayböck, Manuel Fettner, Gregor Schlierenzauer, Stefan Kraft) earned bronze.

== Before the championships ==
=== Historical context ===
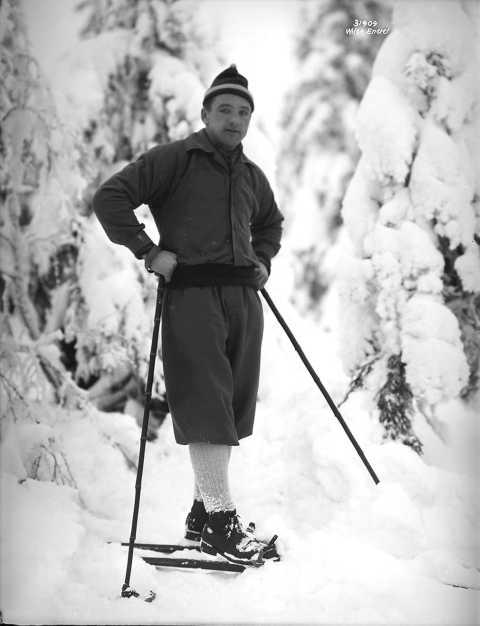
Jacob Tullin Thams, the first ski jumping world champion in Lahti (1926)

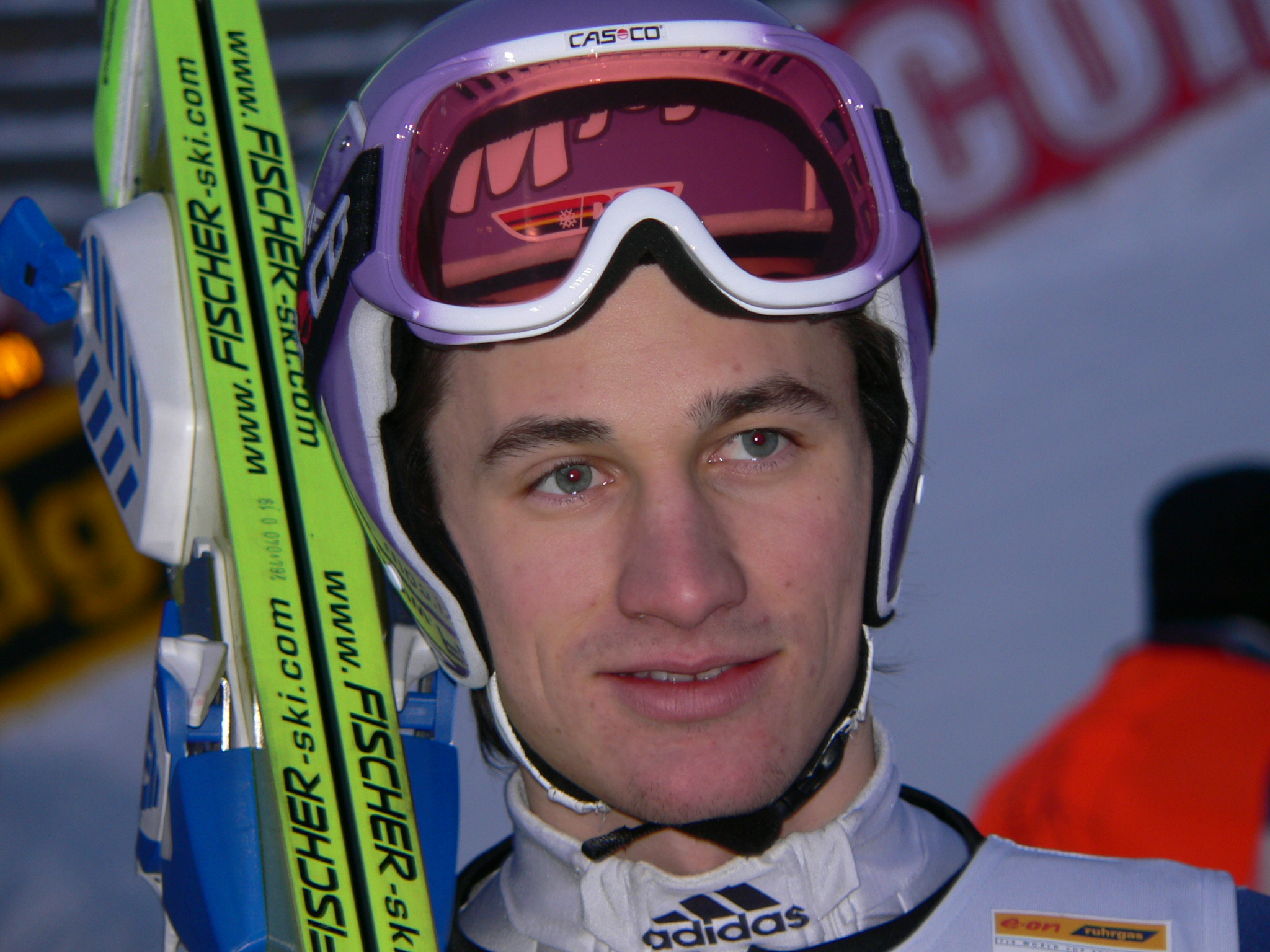
Martin Schmitt, winner of four medals at the 2001 Championships

The first championships in Lahti occurred in 1926, with Norwayn athletes Jacob Tullin Thams, Otto Aasen, and Georg Østerholt sweeping the podium. In 1938, Asbjørn Ruud (Norway) won gold, followed by Stanisław Marusarz (Poland) and Hilmar Myhra (Norway). The 1958 event saw Finnish athletes Juhani Kärkinen and Ensio Hyytiä take gold and silver, with Helmut Recknagel (East Germany) earning bronze.

Later championships in Lahti expanded the number of ski jumping events. In 1978, the normal hill event was won by Matthias Buse, followed by Henry Glaß (both East Germany) and Aleksey Borovitin (Soviet Union). On the large hill, Tapio Räisänen (Finland) won, ahead of Alois Lipburger (Austria) and Falko Weißpflog (East Germany). In a demonstration team event East Germany was first, followed by Finland and Norway.

In 1989, the normal hill event (one round due to weather) was won by Jens Weißflog (East Germany), followed by Ari-Pekka Nikkola (Finland) and Heinz Kuttin (Austria). On the large hill, Jari Puikkonen (Finland) took gold, followed by Jens Weißflog and Matti Nykänen (Finland). The official team event saw Finland, Norway, and Czechoslovakia on the podium.

In 2001, Adam Małysz (Poland) won the normal hill event, followed by Martin Schmitt (Germany) and Martin Höllwarth (Austria). On the large hill, Martin Schmitt took gold, with Adam Małysz and Janne Ahonen (Finland) earning silver and bronze. Two team events were held for the first time: Austria, Finland, and Germany won on the normal hill, while Germany, Austria, and Finland won on the large hill.

=== Defending champions ===
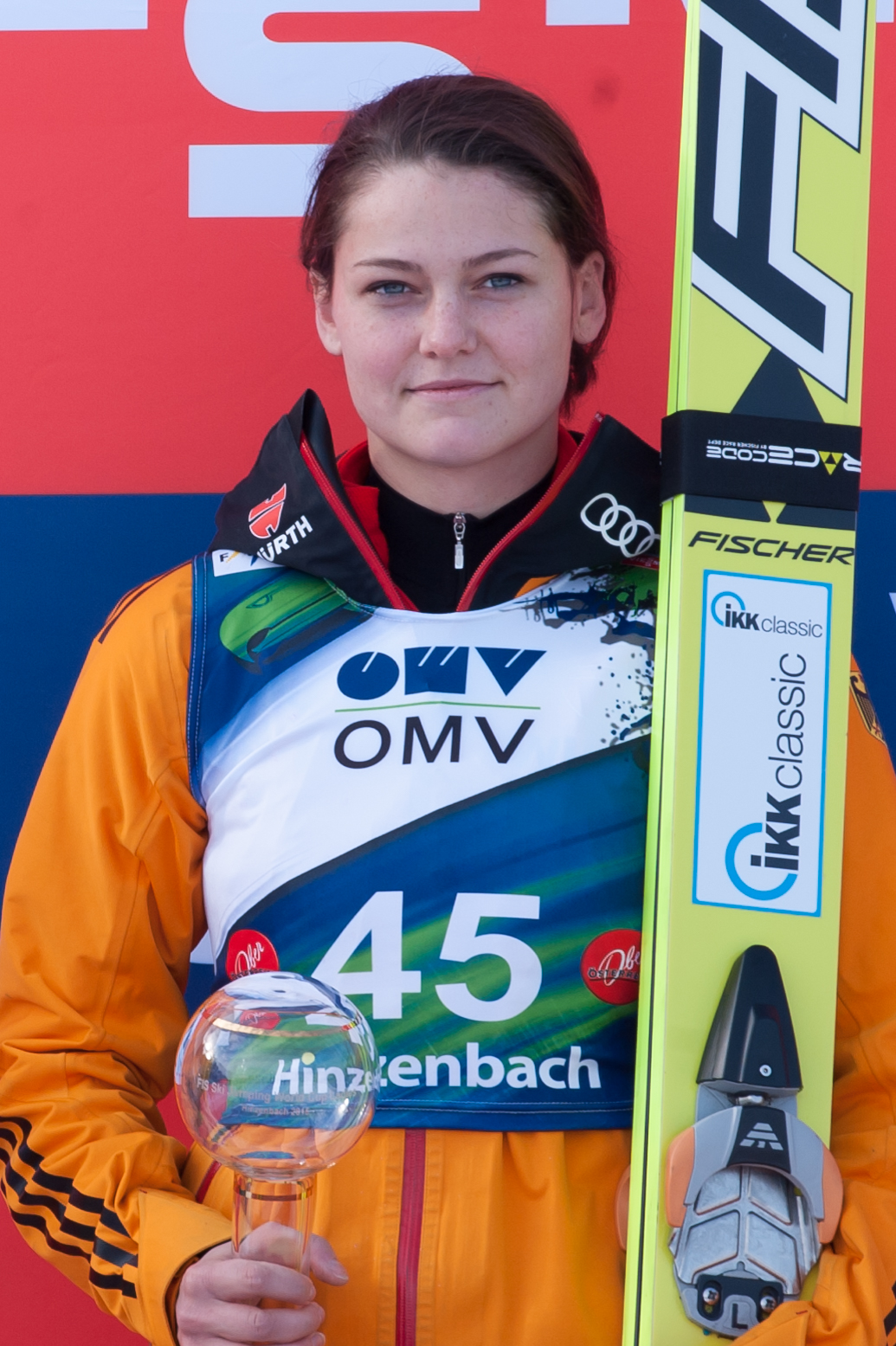
Carina Vogt, defending champion in the women's individual and mixed team events

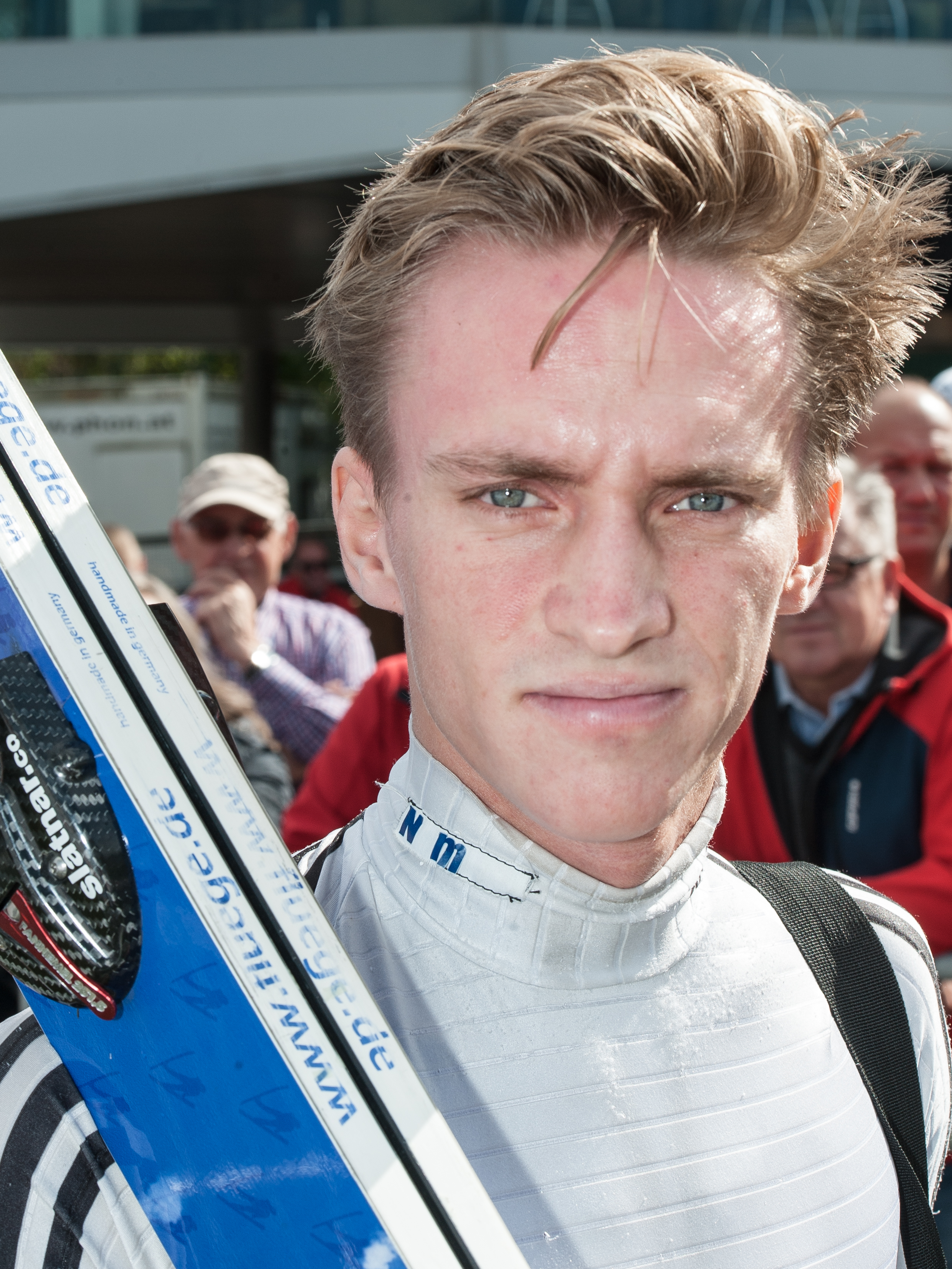
Anders Fannemel, defending champion in the men's team event

In the women's normal hill event, Carina Vogt (Germany) won gold, followed by Yuki Ito (silver) and Daniela Iraschko-Stolz (bronze).

In the men's normal hill event, Rune Velta (Norway) won gold, followed by Severin Freund (Germany) and Stefan Kraft (Austria). On the large hill, Severin Freund took gold, with Gregor Schlierenzauer (Austria) and Rune Velta earning silver and bronze. The men's team event on the large hill was won by Norway (Anders Bardal, Anders Jacobsen, Anders Fannemel, Rune Velta), followed by Austria (Stefan Kraft, Michael Hayböck, Manuel Poppinger, Gregor Schlierenzauer) and Poland (Piotr Żyła, Klemens Murańka, Jan Ziobro, Kamil Stoch).

The mixed team event was won by Germany (Carina Vogt, Richard Freitag, Katharina Schmid, Severin Freund), with Norway (Line Jahr, Anders Bardal, Maren Lundby, Rune Velta) taking silver and Japan (Sara Takanashi, Noriaki Kasai, Yuki Ito, Taku Takeuchi) earning bronze.

=== World Cup standings ===
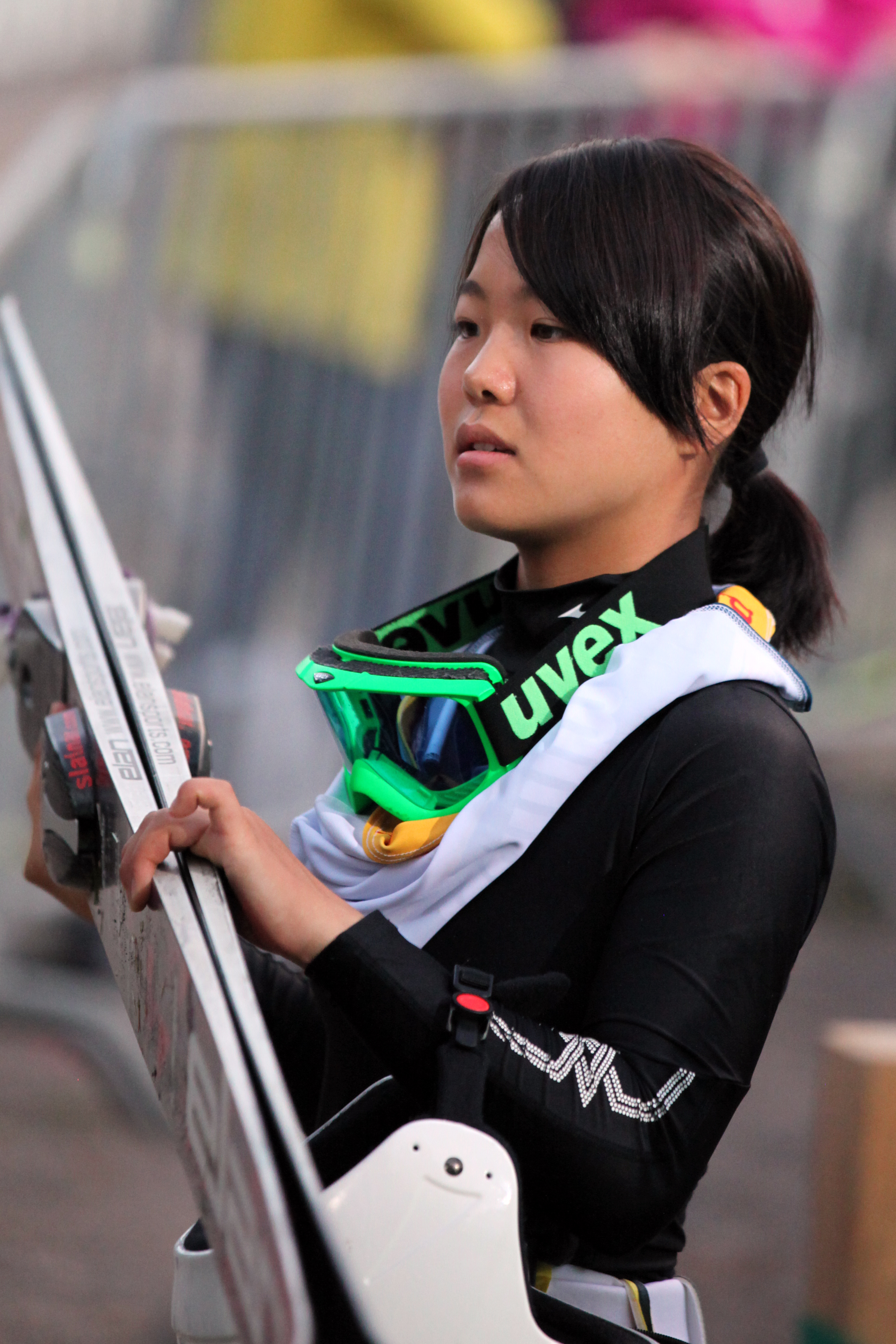
Sara Takanashi

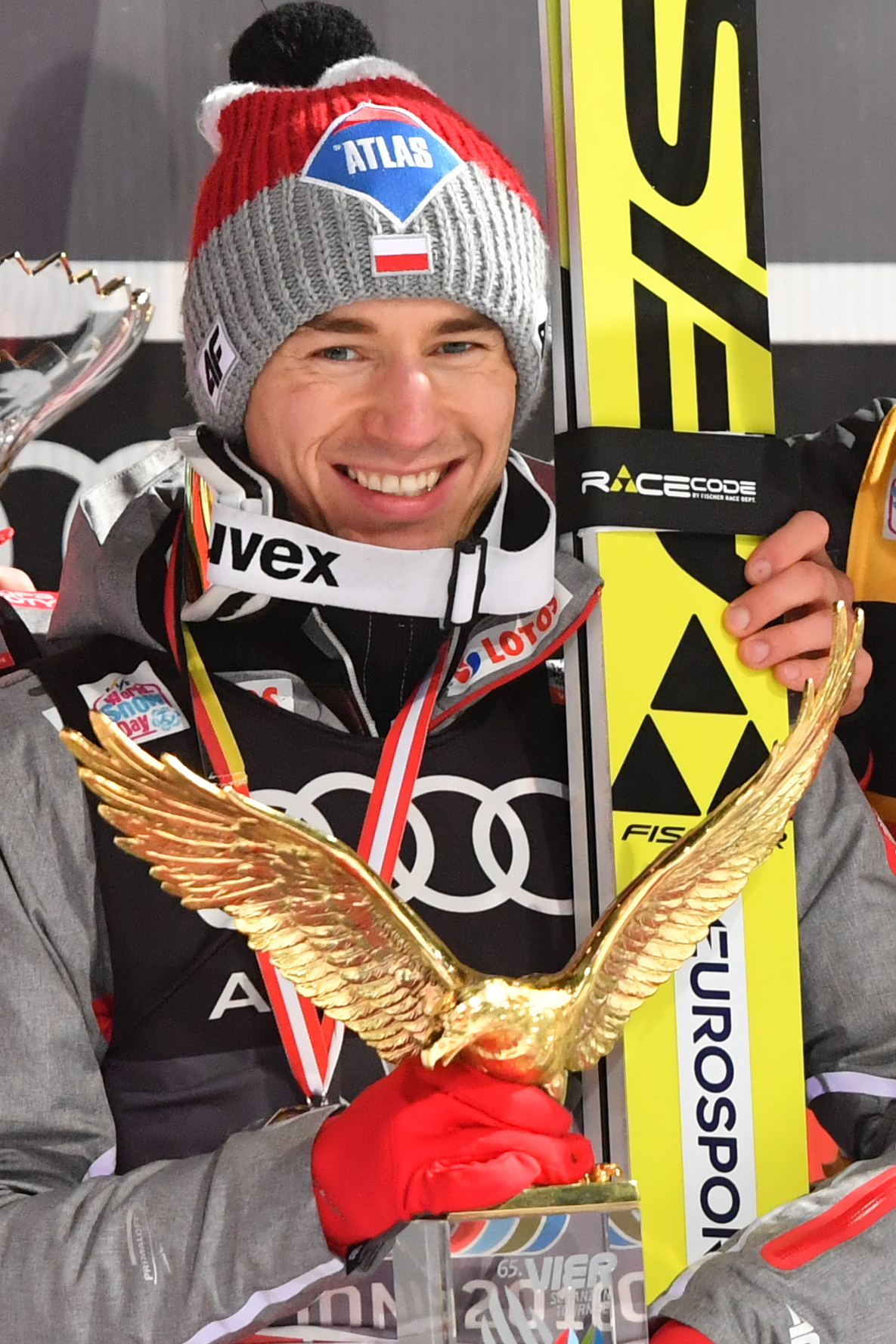
Kamil Stoch

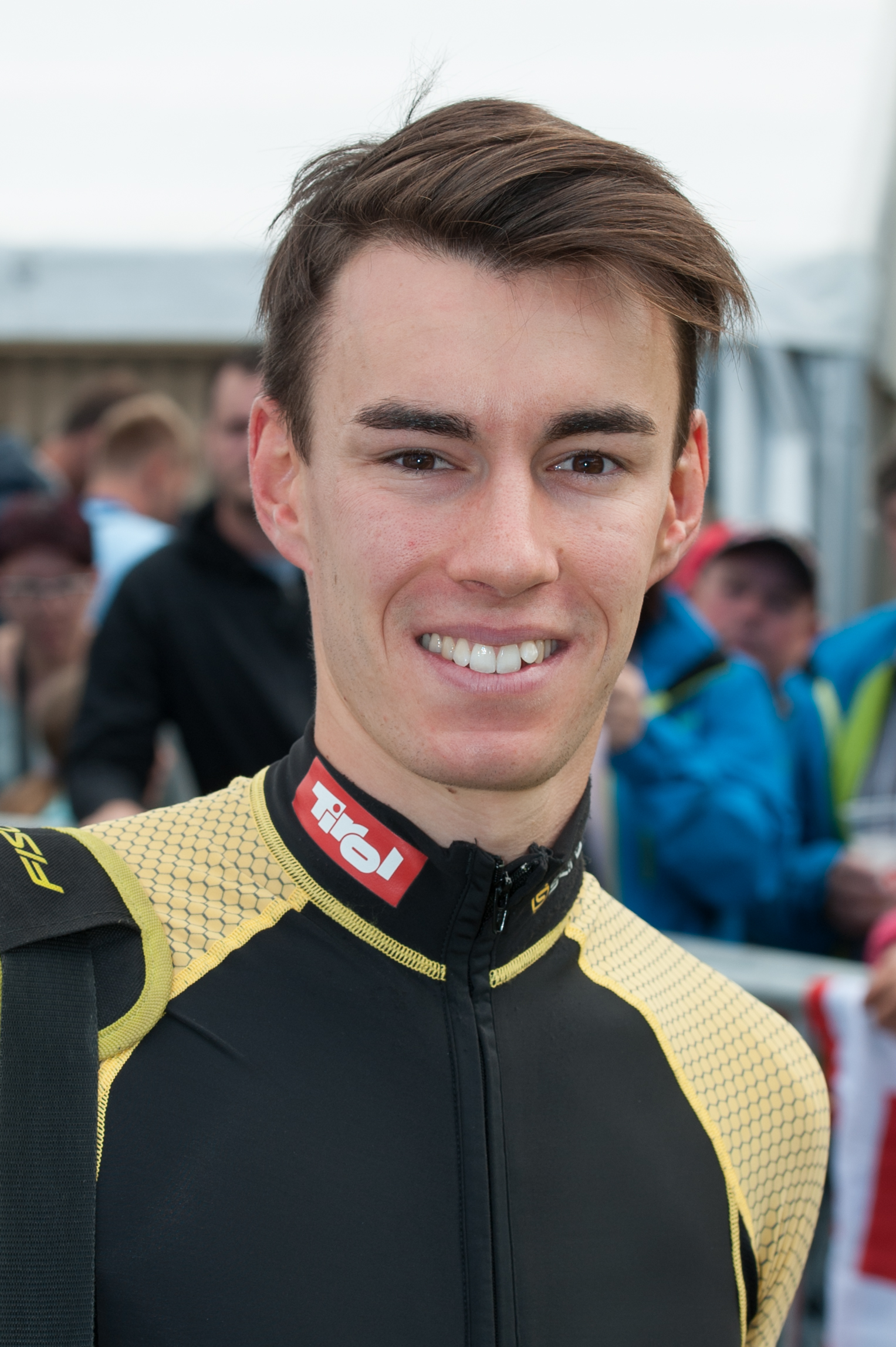
Stefan Kraft

In the Women's World Cup, Sara Takanashi secured the overall title before the championships, winning nine of the 18 competitions. Yuki Ito and Maren Lundby each won four contests, while Katharina Schmid won one. Takanashi led the overall standings with 1375 points, followed by Ito (1108 points) and Lundby (1049 points). The final pre-championship events in Pyeongchang saw victories by Ito and Takanashi.

==== Women's ski jumping World Cup standings before the start of the World Championships ====
Place	Athlete	Appearances	Points
1.	(Japan) Sara Takanashi	16	1375
2.	(Japan) Yuki Ito	16	1108
3.	(Norway) Maren Lundby	18	1049
4.	(Germany) Katharina Schmid	16	726
5.	(Austria) Daniela Iraschko-Stolz	16	717
6.	(Germany) Carina Vogt	16	687
7.	(Slovenia) Ema Klinec	14	590
8.	(Russia) Irina Avvakumova	14	531
9.	(Austria) Jacqueline Seifriedsberger	16	499
10.	(Germany) Svenja Würth	16	468
11.	(Slovenia) Maja Vtič	18	453
12.	(Japan) Yūka Setō	16	380
13.	(Austria) ] Chiara Kreuzer	16	355
14.	(United States) Sarah Hendrickson	14	301
15.	(Italy) Manuela Malsiner	12	298
16.	(United States) Nita Englund	17	268
17.	(Slovenia) Špela Rogelj	16	255
18.	(Japan) Kaori Iwabuchi	17	246
19.	(Germany) Ramona Straub	17	239
20.	(Finland) Julia Kykkänen	18	211
21.	(France) Lucile Morat	15	155
22.	(Slovenia) Urša Bogataj	17	151
23.	(France) Léa Lemare	16	150
24.	(Italy) Elena Runggaldier	15	149
25.	(Russia) Anastasiya Barannikova	18	139
26.	(Germany) Anna Hollandt	4	127
27.	(Russia) Sofia Tikhonova	14	116
28.	(United States) Abby Ringquist	14	100
29.	(Germany) Juliane Seyfarth	15	88
30.	(Italy) Evelyn Insam	13	84
31.	(Germany) Gianina Ernst	8	80
32.	(France) Coline Mattel	13	78
33.	(Canada) Taylor Henrich	11	74
33.	(Slovenia) Nika Vodan	9	74
35.	(Russia) Aleksandra Kustova	11	61
36.	(Russia) Ksenia Kablukova	11	58
37.	(Romania) Daniela Haralambie	13	57
37.	(Slovenia) Eva Logar	12	57
37.	(Germany) Agnes Reisch	6	57
40.	(United States) Tara Geraghty-Moats	13	52
41.	(Germany) Luisa Görlich	4	50
42.	(France) Océane Avocat Gros	11	47
43.	(Germany) Pauline Heßler	3	28
44.	(Canada) Natasha Bodnarchuk	4	21
44.	(Canada) Atsuko Tanaka	11	21
46.	(Norway) Anniken Mork	13	17
47.	(Italy) Lara Malsiner	5	16
48.	(Canada) Nicole Maurer	2	12
49.	(Japan) Misaki Shigeno	4	11
50.	(Japan) Haruka Iwasa	4	9
51.	(Czech Republic) Barbora Blažková	7	8
51.	(China) Li Xueyao	6	8
51.	(United States) Nina Lussi	6	8
54.	(France) Romane Dieu	4	6
55.	(Canada) Natalie Eilers	2	5
55.	(Canada) Abigail Strate	3	5
57.	(Austria) Marita Kramer	4	2
58.	(South Korea) Park Guy-lim	2	1
58.	(Austria) Eva Pinkelnig	4	1

In the Women's Nations Cup, Japan led with 3,129 points, followed by Germany (2,550 points) and Slovenia (1,580 points).

==== Nations Cup standings in women's ski jumping before the start of the World Championships ====
Place	Nation	Appearances	Points
1.	Japan	18	3129
2.	Germany	18	2550
3.	Slovenia	18	1580
4.	Austria	16	1574
5.	Norway	18	1066
6.	Russia	18	905
7.	United States	18	729
8.	Italy	16	547
9.	France	18	436
10.	Finland	18	211
11.	Canada	16	138
12.	Romania	13	57
13.	China	6	8
13.	Czech Republic	7	8
15.	South Korea	2	1

In the Men's World Cup, 21 individual and three team competitions were held before the championships. Kamil Stoch led with six individual victories, followed by Stefan Kraft and Domen Prevc (four each), Maciej Kot and Daniel-André Tande (two each), and Severin Freund, Michael Hayböck, Peter Prevc, and Andreas Wellinger (one each). Stoch led the overall standings with 1,280 points, followed by Kraft (1,220 points) and Tande (1,119 points). The final pre-championship events in Pyeongchang saw victories by Kraft (large hill) and Kot (normal hill).

==== Men's ski jumping World Cup standings before the start of the World Championships ====
Place	Athlete	Appearances	Points
1.	(Poland) Kamil Stoch	21	1280
2.	(Austria) Stefan Kraft	20	1220
3.	(Norway) Daniel-André Tande	21	1119
4.	(Slovenia) Domen Prevc	21	899
5.	(Poland) Maciej Kot	21	883
6.	(Germany) Andreas Wellinger	21	848
7.	(Austria) Michael Hayböck	20	671
8.	(Austria) Manuel Fettner	21	622
9.	(Germany) Markus Eisenbichler	19	587
10.	(Slovenia) Peter Prevc	19	559
11.	(Poland) Piotr Żyła	21	529
12.	(Germany) Richard Freitag	20	435
13.	(Norway) Andreas Stjernen	21	399
14.	(France) Vincent Descombes Sevoie	21	348
15.	(Russia) Evgenii Klimov	21	346
16.	(Germany) Karl Geiger	21	316
17.	(Germany) Severin Freund	9	309
18.	(Austria) Andreas Kofler	15	306
19.	(Poland) Dawid Kubacki	21	299
20.	(Germany) Stephan Leyhe	19	290
21.	(Norway) Robert Johansson	18	288
22.	(Slovenia) Jurij Tepeš	21	249
23.	(Japan) Daiki Ito	16	175
23.	(Japan) Noriaki Kasai	21	175
25.	(Czech Republic) Roman Koudelka	18	146
26.	(Norway) Anders Fannemel	14	120
27.	(Poland) Jan Ziobro	14	119
28.	(Japan) Taku Takeuchi	17	115
29.	(Slovenia) Jernej Damjan	14	112
30.	(Poland) Stefan Hula	20	110
31.	(Czech Republic) Vojtěch Štursa	12	88
32.	(Slovenia) Anže Lanišek	11	85
33.	(Germany) Andreas Wank	13	84
34.	(Switzerland) Simon Ammann	15	81
34.	(Austria) Markus Schiffner	16	81
36.	(Austria) Gregor Schlierenzauer	5	80
37.	(Czech Republic) Jakub Janda	17	78
38.	(Russia) Denis Kornilov	19	77
39.	(Slovenia) Cene Prevc	15	67
40.	(Canada) Mackenzie Boyd-Clowes	17	52
40.	(Norway) Johann André Forfang	8	52
42.	(Austria) Clemens Aigner	8	50
43.	(United States) Kevin Bickner	19	34
44.	(Norway) Halvor Egner Granerud	12	31
45.	(Italy) Sebastian Colloredo	5	29
46.	(Czech Republic) Lukáš Hlava	15	26
47.	(Finland) Janne Ahonen	7	24
47.	(Finland) Jarkko Määttä	11	24
49.	(Japan) Junshirō Kobayashi	6	20
50.	(Czech Republic) Viktor Polášek	2	18
50.	(Czech Republic) Tomáš Vančura	11	18
52.	(Russia) Alexey Romashov	4	17
53.	(Norway) Tom Hilde	8	16
53.	(Finland) Ville Larinto	10	16
53.	(Slovenia) Anže Semenič	9	16
56.	(Russia) Dmitriy Vassiliev	9	15
57.	(Austria) Stefan Huber	5	12
57.	(Germany) David Siegel	2	12
59.	(Japan) Kento Sakuyama	13	9
59.	(Poland) Aleksander Zniszczoł	8	9
61.	(Switzerland) Gregor Deschwanden	8	8
62.	(Austria) Florian Altenburger	4	4
62.	(Italy) Davide Bresadola	3	4
62.	(Poland) Klemens Murańka	9	4
65.	(United States) Michael Glasder	9	3
65.	(Slovenia) Bor Pavlovčič	3	3
67.	(Estonia) Kaarel Nurmsalu	6	2
67.	(Austria) Elias Tollinger	3	2
68.	(Austria) Daniel Huber	4	1
68.	(Japan) Yūken Iwasa	2	1
68.	(Switzerland) Gabriel Karlen	4	1

In the men's team events, Poland won two competitions, and Germany won one. In the Men's Nations Cup, Poland led with 4,383 points, followed by Austria (3,949 points) and Germany (3,931 points).

==== Nations Cup standings in men's ski jumping before the start of the World Championships ====
Place	Nation	Appearances	Individual	Team	Total
1.	Poland	24	3233	1150	4383
2.	Austria	24	3049	900	3949
3.	Germany	24	2881	1050	3931
4.	Slovenia	24	1990	750	2740
5.	Norway	24	2025	650	2675
6.	Russia	24	455	250	705
7.	Japan	24	495	200	695
8.	Czech Republic	24	374	300	674
9.	France	21	348	–	348
10.	Finland	21	64	100	164
11.	Switzerland	16	90	50	140
12.	Canada	17	52	–	52
13.	United States	20	37	0	37
14.	Italy	7	33	–	33
15.	Estonia	6	2	–	2

The mixed team event start list was based on combined women's and men's Nations Cup points. Germany led with 6,481 points, followed by Austria (5,523 points) and Poland (4,383 points), though Poland did not enter the mixed event due to a lack of female competitors.

==== Combined Nations Cup standings for women and men before the start of the World Championships ====
Place	Nation	Women	Men	Total
1.	Germany	2550	3931	6481
2.	Austria	1574	3949	5523
3.	Poland	0	4383	4383
4.	Slovenia	1580	2740	4320
5.	Japan	3129	695	3824
6.	Norway	1066	2675	3741
7.	Russia	905	705	1610
8.	France	436	348	784
9.	United States	729	37	766
10.	Czech Republic	8	674	682
11.	Italy	547	33	580
12.	Finland	211	164	375
13.	Canada	138	52	190
14.	Switzerland	0	140	140
15.	Romania	57	0	57
16.	China	8	–	8
17.	Estonia	–	2	2
18.	South Korea	1	0	1

== Competition schedule ==
Training sessions on the normal hill scheduled for 22 February were cancelled due to strong winds.

Event	Date																										
Event	21 Feb		22 Feb		23 Feb				24 Feb				25 Feb		26 Feb	27 Feb	28 Feb		1 Mar			2 Mar		3 Mar		4 Mar	
HS 100 Men's Individual			TB 10:00 AM	~~T~~ ~~1:30 PM~~	T 4:30 PM		TB 7:00 PM		TR 1:00 PM		Q 2:30 PM	TB 4:00 PM	TR 4:30 PM	C 5:30 PM													
HS 130 Men's Individual																T 9:00 AM	T 5:00 PM	TB 7:00 PM	TR 4:00 PM	Q 6:00 PM	TB 7:00 PM	TR 5:30 PM	C 6:30 PM				
HS 130 Men's Team																								T 5:30 PM	TB 7:00 PM	TR 4:15 PM	C 5:15 PM
HS 100 Women's Individual	TB 10:00 AM	TB 2:00 PM	T 10:00 AM			TB 12:30 PM	TR 2:30 PM	Q 4:00 PM	TB 5:30 PM	TR 10:00 AM	C 11:00 AM																
HS 100 Mixed Team																			T 4:00 PM	TB 5:30 PM	TR 4:00 PM	C 5:00 PM					

TB: Technical briefing, T: Training, TR: Trial round, Q: Qualification, C: Competition

== Ski jumps ==
Name of the hill	City	K-point	Hill size	Hill record			Gate compensation	Wind compensation
Salpausselkä	(Finland) Lahti	K-90	HS 100	99.5 m	(Japan) Sara Takanashi	19 February 2016	±7.00 pts / m	headwind: –8.00 pts / m/s tailwind: +9.68 pts / m/s
Salpausselkä	(Finland) Lahti	K-90	HS 100	101,.0 m	(Slovenia) Jurij Tepeš	03 March 2012	±7.00 pts / m	headwind: –8.00 pts / m/s tailwind: +9.68 pts / m/s
Salpausselkä	(Finland) Lahti	K-116	HS 130	135.5 m	(Austria) Andreas Widhölzl	04 March 2006	±7.56 pts / m	headwind: –8.46 pts / m/s tailwind: +10.24 pts / m/s

== Jury ==
On behalf of the International Ski Federation, the competition directors were Chika Yoshida (director of the Women's World Cup) and Walter Hofer (director of the Men's World Cup). As in the World Cup competitions, Yoshida's assistant was Miran Tepeš, and Hofer's assistant was Borek Sedlák. Additionally, the competition manager appointed by the organizers was Mika Jukkara. The technical delegate for all events was Geir Steinar Loeng from Norway, assisted by Sašo Komovec from Slovenia. Equipment control was handled by Agnieszka Baczkowska (for the women's competitions) and Sepp Gratzer (for the men's events).

Judge	Country	Judges tower position				
Judge	Country	Women's Ind. HS 100	Men's Ind. HS 100	Mixed Team HS 100	Men's Ind. HS 130	Men's Team HS 130
Pirjo Karlajainen	Finland	A	E	–	D	A
Christian Kathol	Austria	B	–	A	E	B
Yutaka Minemura	Japan	C	A	B	–	C
Kazimierz Bafia	Poland	D	B	C	A	D
Bojan Jošt	Slovenia	E	C	D	B	–
Mark Levasseur	United States	–	D	E	C	E

== Course of the competition ==
=== Official women's training rounds ===
On 21 February, three official women's training rounds were held. In the first round, Sara Takanashi received the highest score, reaching a distance of 97 metres. She was followed by Yuki Ito (95.5 m) and Kaori Iwabuchi (97.5 m; she jumped from a higher start gate than the other two athletes). In the second training round, the best result was achieved by Ito with a jump of 93.5 metres. The next places went to Takanashi (95 m) and Katharina Schmid (97 m; she also jumped from a longer inrun). In the third round, the highest scores again went to Ito (99 m) and Takanashi (96.5 m; the only athlete in the series to jump from a lower gate), with the third-best result going to Svenja Würth (94 m). In each of the training rounds, over a dozen registered competitors did not jump.

Further training rounds were scheduled for the following day, but the first one was interrupted after 21 attempts due to excessively strong wind.

=== Official men's training rounds on the normal hill ===
The first men's training rounds were scheduled for 22 February, but – similar to the women's competition – unfavourable wind conditions made it impossible to carry them out. The training was successfully held the following day. In the first round, the best result was achieved by Dawid Kubacki with a jump of 92.5 metres. The second-best distance score was shared by Maciej Kot (93.5 m) and Johann André Forfang (93 m). In the second round, the longest jump was made by Manuel Fettner, who reached 97 metres. He was followed by Kamil Stoch (96.5 m) and Kot (95 m). In the third training round, Markus Eisenbichler earned the highest score with a jump of 98.5 metres. He was followed by Stephan Leyhe (98 m) and Michael Hayböck (95.5 m).

=== Qualifications for the women's individual competition ===
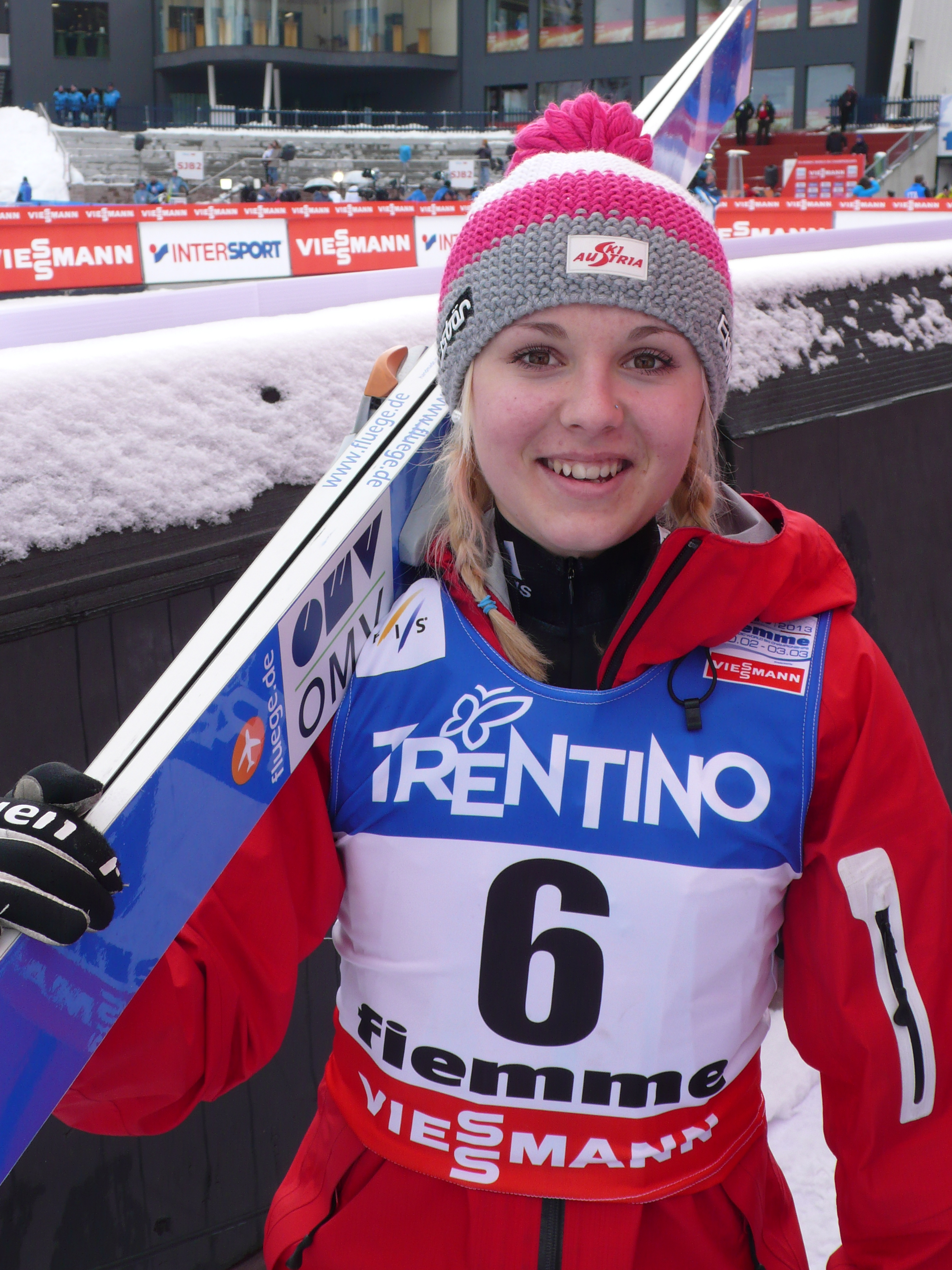
Chiara Kreuzer – the best in the women's competition qualifications

In the practice round before the women's competition qualifications, Sara Takanashi jumped the furthest, reaching 95 m. The next places were taken by Svenja Würth and Katharina Schmid.

In the qualification round held on February 23, 49 athletes from 16 countries participated, including a group of 10 pre-qualified jumpers. Chiara Kreuzer took first place with a jump of 96.5 m. Directly behind her were Elena Runggaldier and Manuela Malsiner. Among the jumpers with automatic qualification rights, Jacqueline Seifriedsberger, Carina Vogt, and Svenja Würth jumped the furthest, each reaching 93 m. All athletes representing Germany (five), Japan, Russia, Slovenia, and Italy (four each), Austria, Canada, and Norway (three each), as well as France and the United States (two each), and two jumpers each from China and the Czech Republic, and one each from Finland and Romania advanced to the main competition.

Both representatives from Kazakhstan, two athletes each from China and Finland, one Czech, and one Romanian failed to qualify. Additionally, the only jumper from Latvia was disqualified.

=== Qualifications for the men's normal hill competition ===
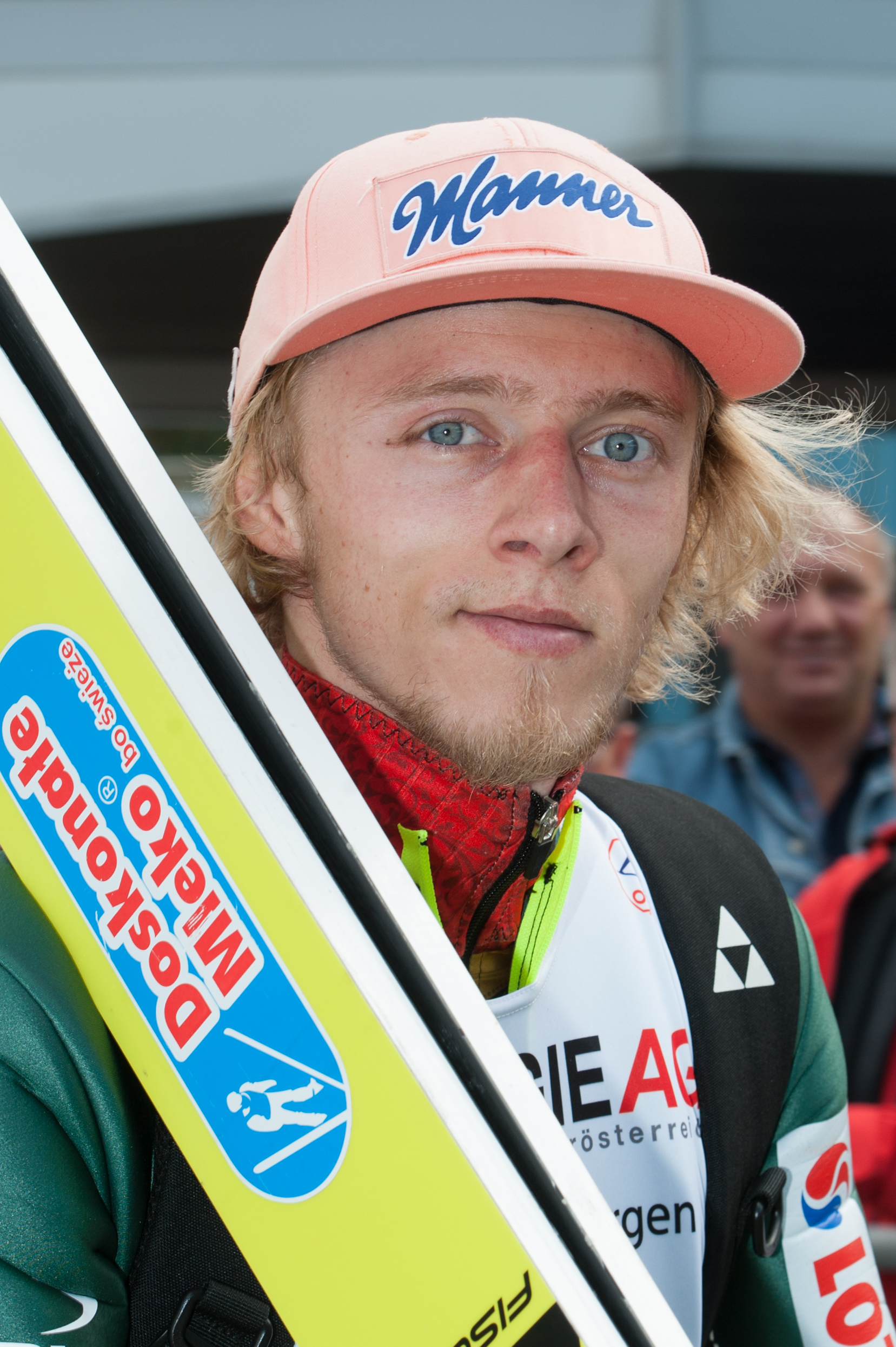
Dawid Kubacki – winner of the qualifications for the men's normal hill competition

In the practice round held before the qualifications for the men's competition on the smaller hill, Kamil Stoch achieved the highest score with a 97 m jump. The next places were taken by Markus Eisenbichler (97 m) and Maciej Kot (98.5 m; both jumped from a longer run-up).

In the qualification round held on February 24, 66 athletes from 22 countries participated, including 10 jumpers with automatic qualification rights. Dawid Kubacki took first place with a 99 m jump. The positions directly behind him were taken by Piotr Żyła (96 m) and Janne Ahonen (97 m). Among the pre-qualified jumpers, Kamil Stoch jumped the furthest, setting a new hill record with 103.5 m. All representatives from Austria, the Czech Republic, Finland, Japan, Germany, Norway, Poland, Russia, Slovenia, and Switzerland (four jumpers each), as well as Italy (three) and France (two), along with two jumpers from the United States and one each from Bulgaria and Canada, secured the right to compete in the main competition.

The qualification round eliminated all representatives from Kazakhstan (four), Romania (two), two athletes each from Estonia, Ukraine, and the United States, one Canadian, and the sole representatives from Georgia, Latvia, and Turkey. Among those who did not advance to the main competition were disqualified jumpers from Kazakhstan, Ukraine, and the United States (one each).

=== Women's individual competition ===
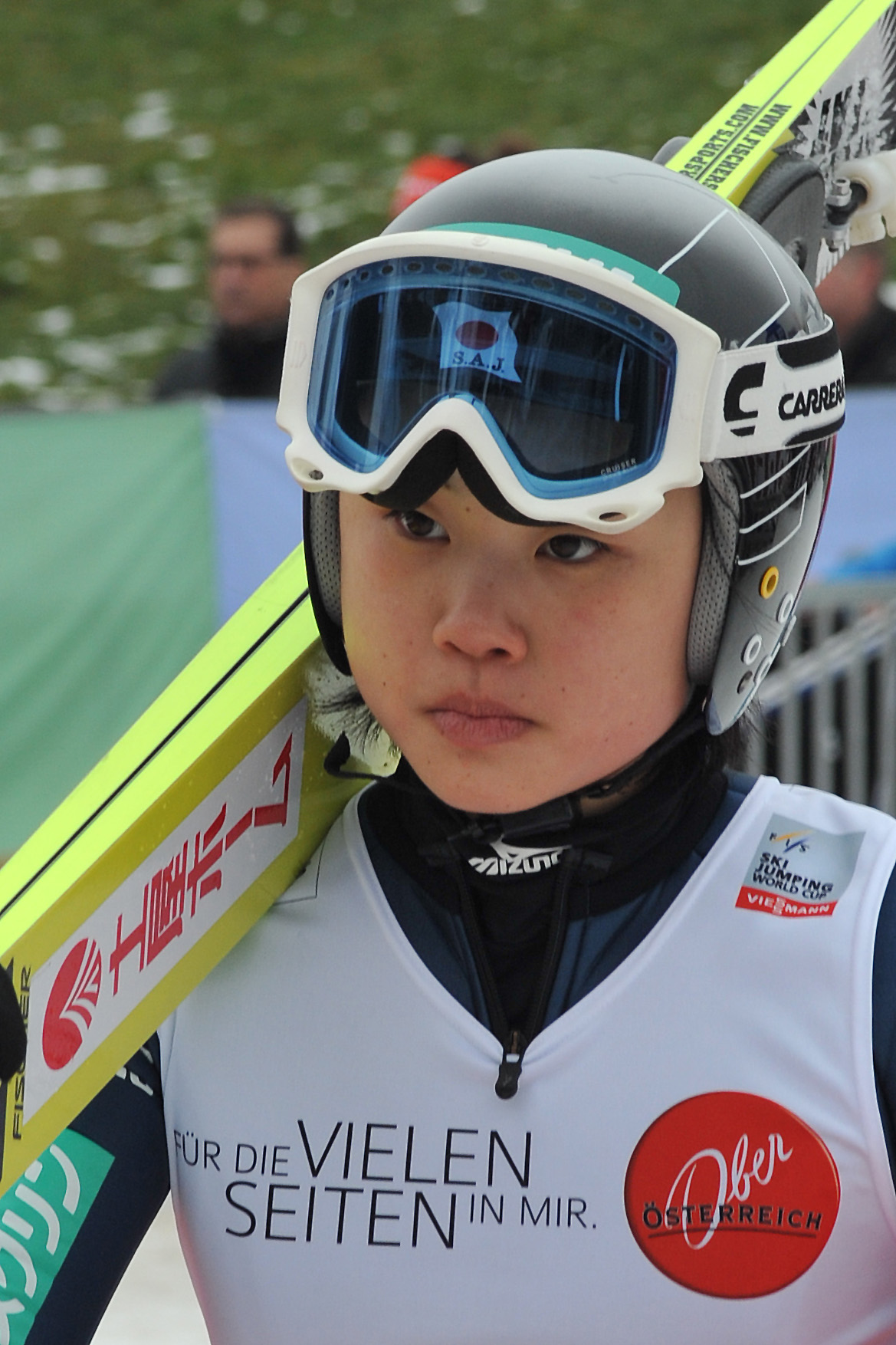
Yuki Ito – silver medalist in the women's competition

The practice round before the women's individual competition began on February 24 at 4:31 PM. The highest score was achieved by the defending champion Carina Vogt (Germany), who jumped 98 m. Second was Sara Takanashi, who jumped three meters shorter, and third was Yuki Ito (both from Japan) with a distance of 93 m.

In the first competition round, starting at 5:30 PM, 50 athletes from 14 countries participated. The sky was cloudy, with air temperatures from –5 to –6 °C, snow at –12 °C, and an average wind speed of 0.60 m/s. All jumpers started from the 18th gate. The first to start was Czech Marta Křepelková, who jumped 77 m. She was surpassed by Norway's Silje Opseth (83 m), who was then overtaken by Romania's Daniela Haralambie (83.5 m). Slovenia's Nika Vodan, starting 12th, was the first to exceed the construction point with a 90.5 m jump, taking the lead with a 13.5-point advantage over Haralambie. Canada's Taylor Henrich took second place with an 88 m jump.

Italy's Elena Runggaldier, starting 18th, became the new leader with a 92 m jump, surpassing Križnar by 7.4 points. France's Léa Lemare (90 m) followed closely behind. Japan's Kaori Iwabuchi (starting 23rd) also jumped 92 m but received lower style points, placing second. Italy's Manuela Malsiner (starting 26th) exceeded the construction point with a 91 m jump but was fifth due to lower judges' scores. Austria's Chiara Kreuzer (starting 28th) jumped 93.5 m but was just behind Runggaldier by 0.8 points due to lower style points and less wind compensation.

From the final group of 10, Germany's Svenja Würth (starting 31st) took the lead with a 97 m jump, 5.3 points ahead of the previous leader. Austria's Jacqueline Seifriedsberger jumped 94 m, trailing Würth by 1.1 points. Russia's Irina Avvakumova reached the construction point and placed fifth. Slovenia's Ema Klinec became the new leader with a 99 m jump, edging out Würth by 0.6 points. Carina Vogt jumped 98.5 m, taking a 5.2-point lead over Klinec with higher style points and less wind deduction. Austria's Daniela Iraschko-Stolz jumped 93 m, placing fifth, followed by Germany's Katharina Schmid (94 m) in sixth. Norway's Maren Lundby set a new hill record with a 99.5 m jump, leading by 3.3 points over Vogt. Japan's Yuki Ito (97 m) took third, and Sara Takanashi (98 m) placed second. After the first round, Lundby led, followed by Takanashi (2.7 points behind) and Vogt (3.3 points behind).

The second round began at 6:28 PM with 31 athletes from 13 countries; Nita Englund (USA) and Li Xueyao (China) tied for 30th in the first round. The average wind speed was 0.41 m/s, and jumpers started from the 17th gate. Li opened with an 81.5 m jump, surpassed by Englund's 82 m. Subsequent leaders were Germany's Gianina Ernst (81.5 m), Russia's Anastasiya Barannikova (86.5 m), Finland's Julia Kykkänen (82.5 m), Slovenia's Maja Vtič (86 m), and Japan's Yūka Setō (86.5 m). Nika Vodan was the first to exceed the construction point in the final round with a 91.5 m jump. Leadership changed with Irina Avvakumova (90.5 m), Kaori Iwabuchi (89.5 m), and Chiara Kreuzer (91 m).

In the final group, Elena Runggaldier's 81 m jump dropped her out of the top ten. Katharina Schmid took the lead with a 93.5 m jump, 10 points ahead of Kreuzer. Daniela Iraschko-Stolz (89.5 m) followed closely. The next three jumpers maintained their first-round positions: Jacqueline Seifriedsberger (92.5 m), Svenja Würth (94 m), and Ema Klinec (94 m). Yuki Ito's 96.5 m jump, the longest of the round, gave her a 6.8-point lead over Klinec. Carina Vogt matched Ito's 96.5 m but took a two-point lead with higher style points and less wind deduction. Sara Takanashi's 95 m jump placed her third. Maren Lundby closed with a 91 m jump, finishing just off the podium.

Carina Vogt defended her title, beating Ito by 2 points and Takanashi by 3.5 points. The top 10 included three athletes each from Austria, Japan, and Germany, and one from Slovenia.

=== Men's individual normal hill competition ===
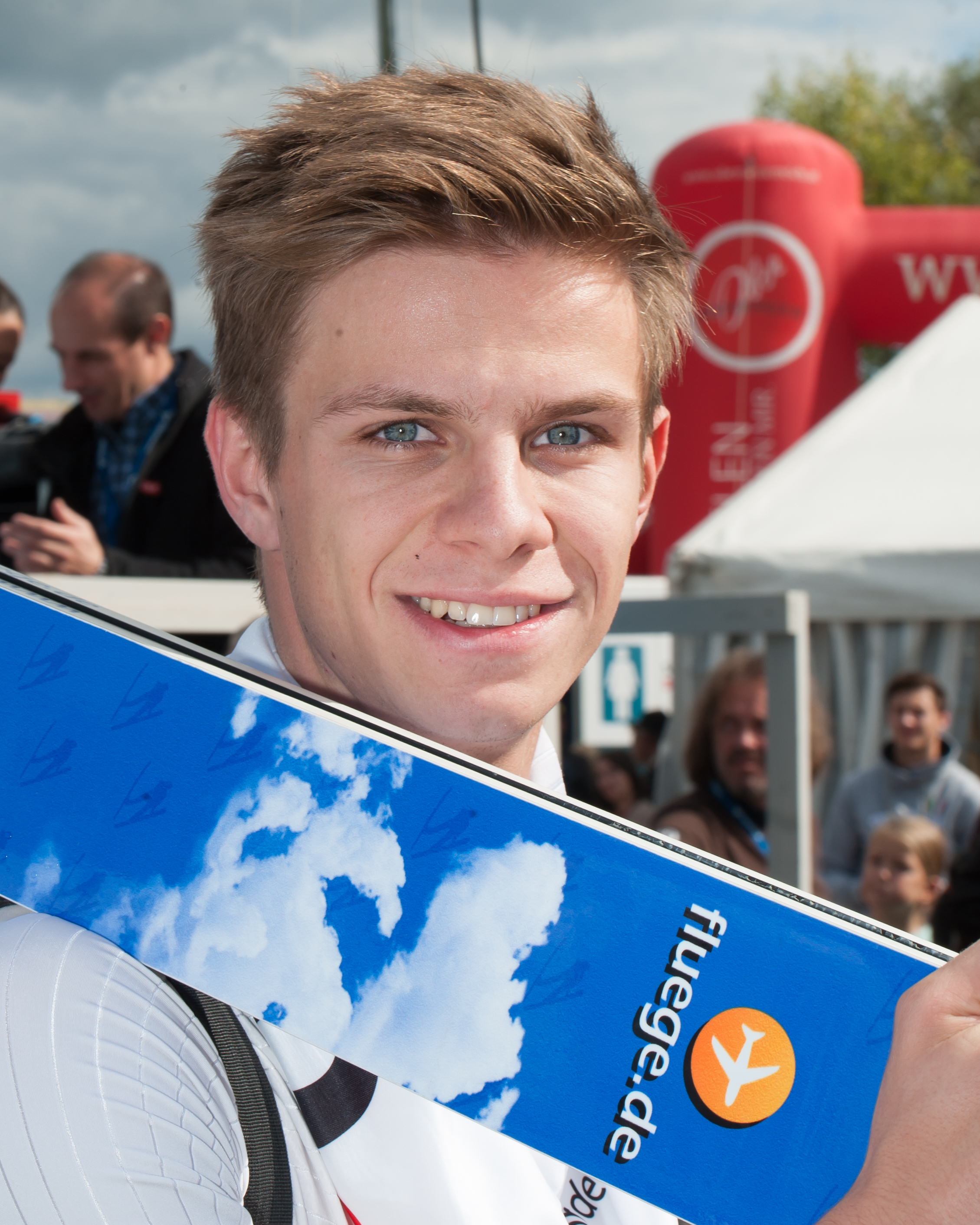
Andreas Wellinger – World Championship silver medalist on the normal hill

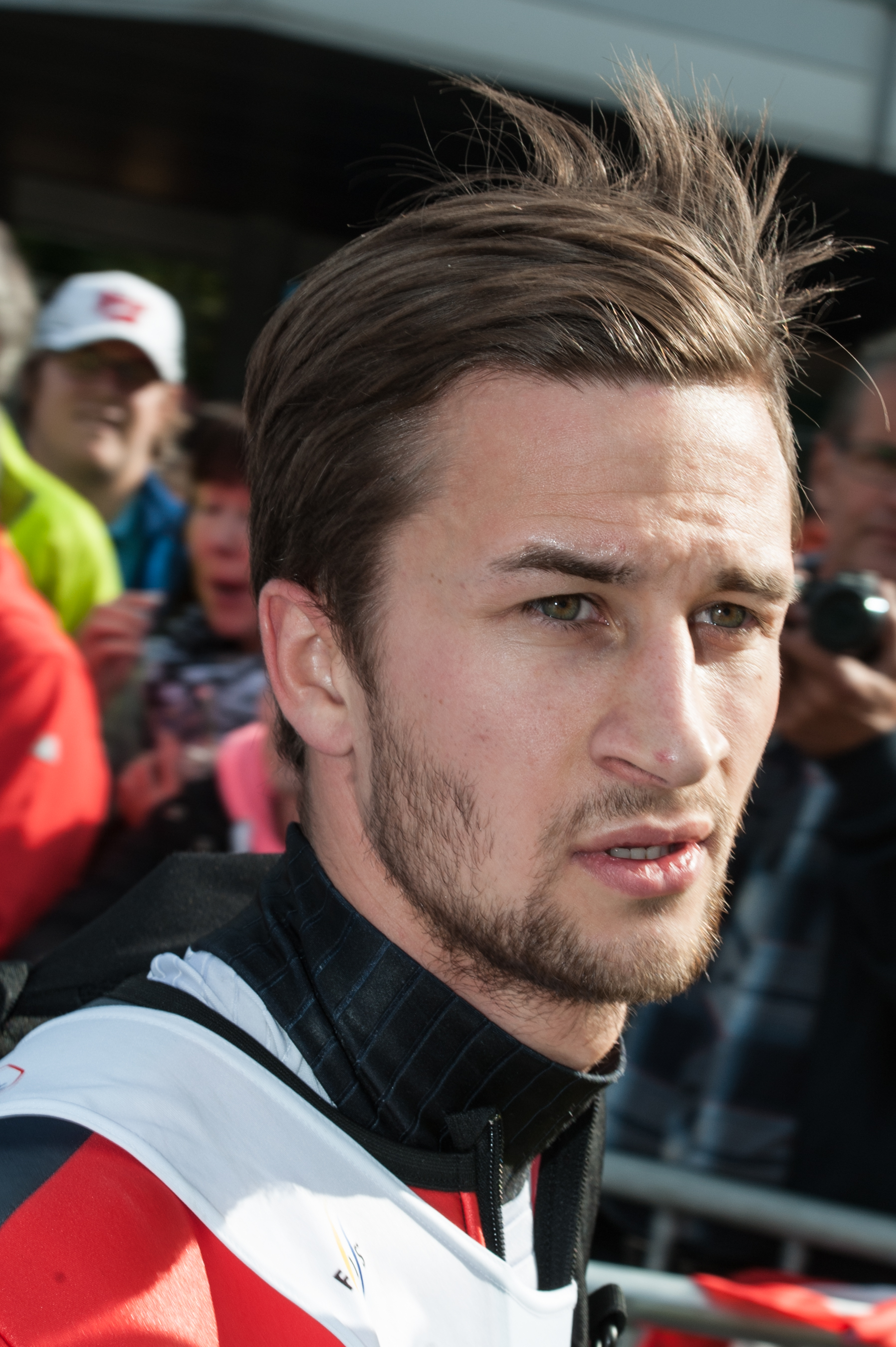
Markus Eisenbichler – bronze medalist on the HS 100 hill

The practice round before the men's competition on the smaller hill began on February 25 at 4:30 PM. The best result was achieved by Germany's Andreas Wellinger with a 98.5 m jump. Poland's Maciej Kot took the second-best score with a 97 m jump, followed by Slovenia's Peter Prevc with 96.5 m. Japan's Noriaki Kasai was the only one who did not attempt a jump.

The first competition round started at 5:30 PM with 50 athletes from 16 countries. The sky was clear, with air temperatures from –4 to –5 °C, snow at –12 °C, and an average wind speed of –0.07 m/s. All jumps were made from the 11th gate. The first competitor, host nation's Antti Aalto, jumped 87.5 m. He was overtaken by Switzerland's Killian Peier (starting 4th), who was the first to exceed the construction point with a 93 m jump, leading after 17 competitors. Others advancing to the final round from this group included Italy's Davide Bresadola (89.5 m), Russia's Dmitriy Vassiliev (90.5 m), and Finland's Ville Larinto (89.5 m) and Janne Ahonen (90.5 m).

Norway's Johann André Forfang (starting 22nd) became the next leader with a 93 m jump, surpassing Peier by 2.4 points due to higher style points and better wind compensation. Russia's Denis Kornilov (92.5 m) placed fourth. Austria's Gregor Schlierenzauer (89.5 m) and Switzerland's Simon Ammann (91.5 m) followed closely behind Forfang and Peier. Japan's Taku Takeuchi (94.5 m) took second place due to negative wind compensation. Czech Republic's Roman Koudelka (starting 30th) matched Forfang's 93 m distance and total score. Noriaki Kasai reached the construction point, securing a spot in the final round. Japan's Daiki Ito became the new leader with a 95.5 m jump, leading Forfang and Koudelka by 2.3 points. Poland's Dawid Kubacki (starting 35th) jumped 96.5 m, taking a 4.6-point lead over Ito.

Kubacki held the lead after jumps from nine more competitors, including Russia's Evgenii Klimov (91.5 m), Norway's Andreas Stjernen (95 m), and Germany's Richard Freitag (94.5 m). Among pre-qualified jumpers, Peter Prevc (92.5 m) was the first to compete. Germany's Markus Eisenbichler jumped 95 m, trailing Kubacki by one point. Austria's Manuel Fettner matched Eisenbichler's distance but placed fourth due to wind deductions. Austria's Michael Hayböck took the lead with a 98 m jump, leading Kubacki by 1.6 points. Andreas Wellinger then surpassed him by 0.6 points with a 96.5 m jump, benefiting from higher style points and wind compensation. Maciej Kot placed fifth with a 95 m jump. Slovenia's Domen Prevc (89 m) did not advance to the final round. Norway's Daniel-André Tande (92.5 m) finished in the lower half of the top 20. Austria's Stefan Kraft achieved the best result of the round with a 99.5 m jump, the longest of the series. Poland's Kamil Stoch closed the round with a 96.5 m jump, placing fourth. Before the final round, Kraft led Wellinger by 4.3 points and Hayböck by 4.9 points.

The final round began at 6:37 PM with 30 athletes from 11 countries. The average wind speed was –0.07 m/s. Dmitriy Vassiliev opened with an 86.5 m jump, finishing 30th. He was surpassed by Davide Bresadola (90.5 m), followed by Ville Larinto (89.5 m), Czech Republic's Jakub Janda (90 m), Evgenii Klimov (90.5 m), and Simon Ammann (92 m). Norway's Daniel-André Tande jumped 94.5 m, leading Ammann by 8.1 points. Norway's Robert Johansson matched Tande's distance but placed behind due to lower wind compensation. Peter Prevc took the lead with a 95 m jump. Andreas Stjernen, despite matching Prevc's distance, placed fourth due to lower style points. Johann André Forfang then jumped 98.5 m, taking a 5.9-point lead over Prevc and securing a top-10 finish. Roman Koudelka (92.5 m) and Stephan Leyhe (94 m) followed.

The final group began with Richard Freitag's 96 m jump. Manuel Fettner, tied with Freitag after the first round, jumped 94.5 m and dropped to the lower half of the top 20. Daiki Ito also jumped 94.5 m, maintaining a mid-tier position with better style points and wind compensation. Maciej Kot took the lead with a 95.5 m jump, only to be surpassed by Markus Eisenbichler's 100.5 m jump, the longest of the competition, by 8.5 points. Eisenbichler secured a podium spot as Dawid Kubacki (93.5 m) placed fourth, Kamil Stoch (99 m) took second with a 1.1-point deficit, and Michael Hayböck (95.5 m) dropped three spots. Andreas Wellinger (100 m) and Stefan Kraft (98 m) maintained their first-round positions, with Kraft winning the title.

Kraft won with a 2.1-point lead over Wellinger and 7.2 points over Eisenbichler. The top 10 included three athletes each from Germany and Poland, two from Austria, and one each from Japan and Norway.

=== Official training sessions for the men's large hill competition ===
Training sessions on the larger hill began on February 27. In the first session, Kamil Stoch achieved the best result with a 131.5 m jump. Peter Prevc had the second-best result at 127.5 m, followed by Maciej Kot at 123.5 m. In the next training session, Stoch again took the top spot with a 126 m jump. Andreas Stjernen earned the second-best score with 124 m, and Robert Johansson took third with 125.5 m. In the final session of the day, Stephan Leyhe jumped the furthest at 129.5 m, followed by Daniel-André Tande at 128.5 m and Stoch at 124.5 m. Most athletes who participated in the mixed team competition the previous day, along with several others, did not take part in these sessions.

Training on the large hill continued on February 28. In the first session, Andreas Stjernen led with a 127 m jump, followed by Anders Fannemel at 124 m and Maciej Kot at 119.5 m. In the second training session, Stjernen and Fannemel again secured the top results, jumping 129.5 m and 129 m, respectively. Johann André Forfang took the third-best result with 128.5 m. In the third session, Stefan Kraft jumped the furthest at 131.5 m, followed by Piotr Żyła at 128 m and Robert Johansson at 126 m. More athletes skipped these sessions compared to February 27, with 32 out of 78 registered jumpers absent in the final session.

=== Qualifications for the men's large hill competition ===
In the practice round before the qualifications, Peter Prevc jumped the furthest at 125.5 m. The next best results were achieved by Manuel Fettner (122.5 m) and Dawid Kubacki (120.5 m).

The qualification round, held on March 1, saw 61 athletes from 21 countries participate, including 10 jumpers with automatic qualification rights (with Domen Prevc absent, the 11th-ranked World Cup jumper, Piotr Żyła, gained this privilege). Additionally, Latvia's Kristaps Nežborts was registered but did not appear at the start. The best result was achieved by Antti Aalto with a 128.5 m jump. Andreas Stjernen (125 m) and Daiki Ito (121.5 m) took the next positions. Among the pre-qualified athletes, Peter Prevc jumped the furthest at 127.5 m. All representatives from Austria, Finland, Japan, Germany, Norway, Poland, Russia, Slovenia, the United States, and Switzerland (four jumpers each), as well as Italy (three), the sole registered Frenchman, three Czechs, two Estonians, and one Canadian, secured spots in the main competition.

The qualification round eliminated all representatives from Kazakhstan (four), as well as the sole representatives from Bulgaria, Georgia, Turkey, and Ukraine, along with one jumper each from the Czech Republic, Canada, and Estonia. Among them were disqualified jumpers from Bulgaria and Canada (one each).

== Results ==
Abbreviations used in the tables:

- DSQ – disqualification,
- NQ – did not advance to the final round,
- DNS – did not start,
- pq – automatic qualification for the main competition,
- q – qualification for the main competition (outside the automatically qualified group),
- nq – did not qualify for the main competition.

=== Women ===
==== Qualifications for the individual competition on the HS 100 hill (23 February 2017) ====
Position	Number	Athlete	Country	Jump			Style	Total score	Notes
Position	Number	Athlete	Country	Distance	Gate	Wind	Style	Total score	Notes
1.	37	Chiara Hölzl	Austria	96.5	19	0.24	52.5	123.6	q
2.	27	Elena Runggaldier	Italy	91.5	19	0.14	52.5	114.4	q
3.	35	Manuela Malsiner	Italy	98.5	19	1.06	45.5	114.0	q
4.	28	Léa Lemare	France	92.5	19	0.47	52.5	113.7	q
5.	33	Špela Rogelj	Slovenia	92.0	19	0.37	51.0	112.0	q
6.	36	Sarah Hendrickson	United States	91.0	19	0.27	51.5	111.3	q
7.	32	Kaori Iwabuchi	Japan	93.5	19	0.70	49.5	110.9	q
8.	24	Evelyn Insam	Italy	89.5	19	0.32	52.5	108.9	q
9.	21	Nika Križnar	Slovenia	92.0	19	0.37	47.0	108.0	q
10.	22	Taylor Henrich	Canada	90.5	19	0.74	52.0	107.1	q
11.	11	Yūka Setō	Japan	88.5	19	-0.06	48.0	105.6	q
12.	29	Lucile Morat	France	89.0	19	0.19	48.0	104.5	q
13.	31	Ramona Straub	Germany	93.5	19	1.00	45.0	104.0	q
14.	23	Gianina Ernst	Germany	87.5	19	0.09	49.5	103.8	q
15.	25	Sofia Tikhonova	Russia	86.5	19	0.02	50.0	102.8	q
16.	16	Lara Malsiner	Italy	87.5	19	0.31	50.0	102.5	q
17.	26	Anastasiya Barannikova	Russia	88.5	19	0.52	49.5	102.3	q
18.	20	Ksenia Kablukova	Russia	86.0	19	0.08	50.5	101.9	q
19.	12	Chang Xinyue	China	86.5	19	-0.04	46.5	99.9	q
20.	30	Julia Kykkänen	Finland	85.0	19	-0.02	50.0	99.7	q
21.	39	Maja Vtič	Slovenia	83.0	19	-0.29	48.5	97.3	q
22.	19	Daniela Haralambie	Romania	85.5	19	0.20	47.5	96.9	q
23.	6	Silje Opseth	Norway	83.0	19	0.43	50.5	93.1	q
24.	17	Anniken Mork	Norway	84.5	19	0.36	43.5	89.6	q
24.	15	Nicole Maurer	Canada	80.0	19	-0.22	47.5	89.6	q
26.	13	Li Xueyao	China	82.5	19	0.27	46.5	89.3	q
27.	34	Nita Englund	United States	78.5	19	-0.12	47.0	85.2	q
28.	14	Barbora Blažková	Czech Republic	77.0	19	0.02	44.5	78.3	q
28.	1	Marta Křepelková	Czech Republic	76.0	19	0.21	48.0	78.3	q
30.	18	Natasha Bodnarchuk	Canada	74.5	19	-0.05	48.0	77.5	q
31.	3	Liu Qi	China	75.5	19	0.12	46.0	76.0	nq
32.	4	Susanna Forsström	Finland	75.5	19	0.29	44.5	73.2	nq
33.	9	Ma Tong	China	72.5	19	-0.08	43.5	69.3	nq
34.	2	Jenny Rautionaho	Finland	70.0	19	-0.17	46.5	68.1	nq
35.	10	Jana Mrákotová	Czech Republic	71.0	19	-0.14	44.0	67.4	nq
36.	7	Diana Trâmbițaș	Romania	69.0	19	0.07	43.0	60.4	nq
37.	5	Walentina Sdierżykowa	Kazakhstan	65.5	19	0.41	42.5	50.2	nq
38.	11	Dajana Achmietwalijewa	Kazakhstan	56.5	19	0.09	38.5	30.8	nq
–	40	Svenja Würth	Germany	93.0	17	0.22	–		pq
–	41	Jacqueline Seifriedsberger	Austria	93.0	17	0.28	–		pq
–	42	Irina Avvakumova	Russia	80.5	17	0.14	–		pq
–	43	Ema Klinec	Slovenia	87.0	17	-0.34	–		pq
–	44	Carina Vogt	Germany	93.0	17	0.15	–		pq
–	45	Daniela Iraschko-Stolz	Austria	89.0	17	-0.02	–		pq
–	46	Katharina Althaus	Germany	91.5	17	0.24	–		pq
–	47	Maren Lundby	Norway	88.5	17	-0.07	–		pq
–	48	Yūki Itō	Japan	92.0	17	-0.01	–		pq
–	49	Sara Takanashi	Japan	92.5	17	-0.32	–		pq
–	8	Šarlote Šķēle	Latvia	DSQ					

==== Individual competition on the HS 100 hill (24 February 2017) ====
Position	Number	Athlete	Country	1st round					2nd round					Total score
Position	Number	Athlete	Country	Jump			Style	Total score	Jump			Style	Score	Total score
Position	Number	Athlete	Country	Distance	Gate	Wind	Style	Total score	Distance	Gate	Wind	Style	Score	Total score
1.	35	Carina Vogt	Germany	97.0	18	0.26	53.0	127.9	96.5	17	0.10	54.5	126.7	254.6
2.	39	Yuki Ito	Japan	97.0	18	0.13	54.0	127.0	96.5	17	0.17	54.0	125.6	252.6
3.	40	Sara Takanashi	Japan	98.0	18	0.06	53.0	128.5	95.0	17	0.05	54.0	122.6	251.1
4.	38	Maren Lundby	Norway	99.5	18	0.22	54.0	131.2	91.0	17	-0.21	52.5	116.5	247.7
5.	34	Ema Klinec	Slovenia	99.0	18	0.60	49.5	122.7	94.0	17	-0.11	54.0	123.1	245.8
6.	31	Svenja Würth	Germany	97.0	18	0.24	50.0	122.1	94.0	17	-0.01	51.5	119.6	241.7
7.	32	Jacqueline Seifriedsberger	Austria	94.0	18	0.13	54.0	121.0	92.5	17	-0.09	54.0	119.9	240.9
8.	37	Katharina Althaus	Germany	94.0	18	0.49	53.0	117.1	92.5	17	-0.09	54.0	121.9	239.0
9.	36	Daniela Iraschko-Stolz	Austria	93.0	18	0.18	53.0	117.6	89.5	17	-0.31	50.0	112.0	229.6
10.	28	Chiara Hölzl	Austria	93.5	18	0.31	51.5	116.0	91.0	17	0.06	51.5	113.0	229.0
11.	23	Kaori Iwabuchi	Japan	92.0	18	-0.08	49.0	113.8	89.5	17	0.10	49.5	107.7	221.5
12.	33	Irina Avvakumova	Russia	90.0	18	0.17	52.5	111.1	90.5	17	0.34	52.0	110.3	221.4
13.	12	Nika Križnar	Slovenia	90.5	18	0.01	48.5	109.4	91.5	17	0.13	48.0	110.0	219.4
14.	29	Yūka Setō	Japan	88.0	18	-0.12	51.0	108.2	87.5	17	-0.10	49.5	105.5	213.7
15.	26	Manuela Malsiner	Italy	91.0	18	0.08	47.0	108.4	86.5	17	-0.21	49.5	104.5	212.9
16.	13	Taylor Henrich	Canada	88.0	18	-0.25	50.5	108.9	85.0	17	-0.01	51.0	101.1	210.0
17.	30	Maja Vtič	Austria	89.5	18	0.36	51.0	107.1	86.0	17	0.07	50.0	101.4	208.5
18.	18	Elena Runggaldier	Italy	92.0	18	-0.03	52.5	116.8	81.0	17	-0.01	49.5	91.6	208.4
19.	21	Julia Kykkänen	Finland	86.5	18	-0.24	51.0	106.3	82.5	17	-0.18	51.0	97.7	204.0
20.	19	Léa Lemare	France	90.0	18	0.26	52.0	109.9	83.0	17	0.20	49.5	93.9	203.8
21.	17	Anastasiya Barannikova	Russia	84.5	18	0.08	48.5	96.9	86.5	17	-0.20	50.0	104.9	201.8
22.	24	Špela Rogelj	Slovenia	84.0	18	-0.02	49.5	97.7	87.5	17	0.41	51.0	102.7	200.4
23.	27	Sarah Hendrickson	Italy	86.5	18	0.02	51.5	104.3	82.0	17	0.04	50.0	93.7	198.0
24.	20	Lucile Morat	France	85.5	18	-0.12	50.0	102.2	83.5	17	0.17	49.5	95.1	197.3
25.	14	Gianina Ernst	Germany	84.5	18	-0.01	47.5	96.6	81.5	17	-0.12	48.0	92.2	188.8
26.	16	Sofia Tikhonova	Russia	84.0	18	-0.04	49.0	97.4	82.0	17	0.22	48.5	90.7	188.1
27.	25	Nita Englund	United States	85.0	18	0.10	48.5	94.7	82.0	17	-0.02	49.0	93.2	187.9
28.	4	Li Xueyao	China	84.0	18	0.10	47.5	94.7	81.5	17	-0.04	46.5	89.9	184.6
29.	10	Daniela Haralambie	Romania	83.5	18	-0.09	48.0	95.9	79.5	17	0.05	48.0	86.6	182.5
30.	11	Ksenia Kablukova	Slovenia	83.5	18	0.02	49.0	95.8	78.0	17	-0.06	48.5	85.1	180.9
31.	2	Silje Opseth	Finland	83.0	18	0.09	49.5	94.8	79.0	17	0.40	48.0	82.8	177.6
32.	5	Barbora Blažková	Czech Republic	84.0	18	0.20	47.5	93.9	NQ					93.9
33.	15	Evelyn Insam	Italy	83.0	18	0.29	50.0	93.7	NQ					93.7
33.	22	Ramona Straub	Germany	84.0	18	0.23	47.5	93.7	NQ					93.7
35.	3	Chang Xinyue	China	84.0	18	0.18	47.0	93.6	NQ					93.6
36.	8	Anniken Mork	Norway	82.0	18	-0.11	46.5	91.6	NQ					91.6
37.	7	Lara Malsiner	Italy	83.0	18	0.15	46.5	91.3	NQ					91.3
38.	1	Marta Křepelková	Czech Republic	77.0	18	-0.09	47.5	82.4	NQ					82.4
39.	6	Nicole Maurer	Canada	77.0	18	-0.01	46.0	80.1	NQ					80.1
40.	9	Natasha Bodnarchuk	Canada	74.5	18	-0.17	47.5	78.1	NQ					78.1

=== Men ===
==== Qualifications for the individual competition on the HS 100 hill (24 February 2017) ====
Position	Number	Athlete	Country	Jump			Style	Total score	Notes
Position	Number	Athlete	Country	Distance	Gate	Wind	Style	Total score	Notes
1.	51	Dawid Kubacki	Poland	99.0	13	0.35	54.0	129.2	q
2.	56	Piotr Żyła	Poland	96.0	13	-0.05	54.0	126.5	q
3.	33	Janne Ahonen	Finland	97.0	13	0.22	54.0	126.2	q
4.	52	Evgenii Klimov	Russia	97.5	13	0.40	53.5	125.3	q
4.	50	Stephan Leyhe	Germany	96.0	13	0.15	54.5	125.3	q
6.	45	Taku Takeuchi	Japan	94.5	13	-0.20	52.5	123.4	q
7.	30	Alexey Romashov	Russia	96.5	13	0.46	53.5	122.8	q
8.	38	Johann André Forfang	Norway	96.5	13	0.47	53.0	122.2	q
9.	49	Robert Johansson	Norway	93.5	13	-0.09	54.0	121.9	q
10.	29	Ville Larinto	Finland	95.5	13	0.37	52.5	120.5	q
11.	41	Jakub Janda	Czech Republic	94.0	13	0.25	54.0	120.0	q
12.	32	Viktor Polášek	Czech Republic	95.0	13	0.31	52.0	119.5	q
13.	48	Daiki Itō	Japan	93.0	13	0.09	54.0	119.3	q
14.	46	Roman Koudelka	Czech Republic	92.5	13	-0.32	50.5	118.6	q
15.	39	Cene Prevc	Slovenia	94.0	13	0.27	52.5	118.3	q
16.	42	Gregor Schlierenzauer	Austria	92.5	13	0.05	53.5	118.1	q
17.	43	Simon Ammann	Switzerland	88.5	13	-1.11	49.5	117.2	q
17.	47	Noriaki Kasai	Japan	92.0	13	-0.18	51.5	117.2	q
19.	55	Richard Freitag	Germany	90.0	13	-0.41	52.5	116.5	q
20.	25	Davide Bresadola	Italy	90.5	13	-0.30	52.5	116.4	q
20.	10	Killian Peier	Switzerland	93.0	13	0.26	52.5	116.4	q
22.	31	Tomáš Vančura	Czech Republic	91.0	13	-0.06	52.5	115.1	q
23.	36	Kevin Bickner	United States	92.0	13	-0.05	50.5	115.0	q
24.	37	Mackenzie Boyd-Clowes	Canada	91.5	13	0.29	52.5	113.2	q
24.	54	Andreas Stjernen	Norway	89.0	13	-0.43	51.0	113.2	q
26.	14	Alex Insam	Italy	89.5	13	-0.34	49.5	111.8	q
27.	26	Gregor Deschwanden	Switzerland	89.0	13	-0.10	51.0	110.0	q
28.	28	Dmitriy Vassiliev	Russia	92.5	13	0.36	47.5	109.6	q
29.	34	Jarkko Määttä	Finland	90.0	13	0.34	52.0	109.3	q
30.	24	Michael Glasder	United States	87.5	13	-0.30	51.0	108.9	q
31.	40	Denis Kornilov	Russia	89.5	13	0.29	52.0	108.7	q
32.	27	Kento Sakuyama	Japan	88.0	13	-0.16	49.5	108.5	q
33.	53	Vincent Descombes Sevoie	France	88.0	13	-0.30	49.5	108.4	q
34.	1	Antti Aalto	Finland	89.0	13	0.02	50.0	107.8	q
35.	3	Andreas Schuler	Switzerland	87.0	13	-0.24	50.0	106.3	q
36.	2	Vladimir Zografski	Bulgaria	85.0	13	-0.26	50.0	102.5	q
37.	35	Sebastian Colloredo	Italy	87.0	13	0.34	51.0	102.3	q
38.	19	Paul Brasme	France	86.0	13	0.15	51.0	101.8	q
39.	44	Jernej Damjan	Slovenia	86.5	13	0.27	50.0	100.8	q
40.	23	Kaarel Nurmsalu	Estonia	82.5	13	-0.51	49.5	99.4	q
41.	21	Ilia Kratov	Kazakhstan	84.0	13	0.00	49.5	97.5	nq
42.	13	Artti Aigro	Estonia	83.0	13	-0.18	49.5	97.2	nq
43.	16	Fatih Arda İpcioğlu	Turkey	83.0	13	-0.09	49.0	95.9	nq
44.	8	Casey Larson	United States	83.0	13	0.35	49.5	92.7	nq
45.	18	Martti Nõmme	Estonia	80.5	13	-0.20	49.0	91.9	nq
46.	4	Joshua Maurer	Canada	77.5	13	-0.42	48.0	87.1	nq
47.	22	Sorin Mitrofan	Romania	79.0	13	-0.21	48.0	87.0	nq
48.	9	Nikolay Karpenko	Kazakhstan	77.5	13	0.07	47.0	82.4	nq
49.	5	Sorin Iulian Pîtea	Romania	77.5	13	0.16	48.0	81.7	nq
50.	20	Stepan Pasicznyk	Ukraine	79.0	13	0.65	48.0	80.8	nq
51.	12	Roman Nogin	Kazakhstan	72.0	13	0.14	45.5	68.4	nq
52.	15	Artur Sarkisiani	Georgia	68.0	13	-0.14	46.0	63.4	nq
53.	11	Kristaps Nežborts	Latvia	67.0	13	-0.09	44.5	59.4	nq
–	57	Peter Prevc	Slovenia	98.5	13	0.24	–		pq
–	58	Markus Eisenbichler	Germany	DNS					
–	59	Manuel Fettner	Austria	95.5	13	0.12	–		pq
–	60	Michael Hayböck	Austria	95.0	13	-0.15	–		pq
–	61	Andreas Wellinger	Germany	98.5	13	0.17	–		pq
–	62	Maciej Kot	Poland	97.0	13	-0.32	–		pq
–	63	Domen Prevc	Slovenia	88.5	13	0.17	–		pq
–	64	Daniel-André Tande	Norway	94.0	13	-0.03	–		pq
–	65	Stefan Kraft	Austria	99.5	13	0.15	–		pq
–	66	Kamil Stoch	Poland	103.5	13	0.58	–		pq
–	6	William Rhoads	United States	DSQ					
–	7	Alexey Korolev	Kazakhstan	DSQ					
–	17	Vitaliy Kalinichenko	Ukraine	DSQ					

==== Individual competition on the HS 100 hill (25 February 2017) ====
Position	Number	Athlete	Country	1st round					2nd round					Total score
Position	Number	Athlete	Country	Jump			Style	Score	Jump			Style	Score	Total score
Position	Number	Athlete	Country	Distance	Gate	Wind	Style	Score	Distance	Gate	Wind	Style	Score	Total score
1.	49	Stefan Kraft	Austria	99.5	11	0.03	57.0	135.8	98.0	11	-0.21	57.0	135.0	270.8
2.	45	Andreas Wellinger	Germany	96.5	11	-0.31	55.5	131.5	100.0	11	-0.07	56.5	137.2	268.7
3.	42	Markus Eisenbichler	Germany	95.0	11	-0.50	53.5	128.3	100.5	11	0.02	54.5	135.3	263.6
4.	50	Kamil Stoch	Poland	96.5	11	-0.08	56.0	129.8	99.0	11	0.23	56.5	132.7	262.5
5.	46	Maciej Kot	Poland	95.0	11	-0.42	54.0	128.1	95.5	11	-0.15	54.5	127.0	255.1
6.	44	Michael Hayböck	Austria	98.0	11	-0.09	54.0	130.9	95.5	11	-0.15	51.0	123.5	254.4
7.	22	Johann André Forfang	Norway	93.0	11	-0.30	53.5	122.4	98.5	11	0.23	55.5	130.7	253.1
8.	35	Dawid Kubacki	Poland	96.5	11	-0.08	55.5	129.3	93.5	11	0.12	54.0	122.2	251.5
9.	39	Richard Freitag	Germany	94.5	11	-0.09	54.0	123.9	96.0	11	-0.05	54.0	126.5	250.4
10.	32	Daiki Itō	Japan	95.5	11	0.04	54.0	124.7	94.5	11	-0.17	54.5	125.1	249.8
11.	41	Peter Prevc	Slovenia	92.5	11	-0.23	54.0	121.2	95.0	11	-0.10	55.0	126.0	247.2
12.	43	Manuel Fettner	Austria	95.0	11	0.01	54.0	123.9	94.5	11	0.08	54.0	122.4	246.3
13.	34	Stephan Leyhe	Germany	94.0	11	-0.12	54.0	123.2	94.0	11	0.04	54.0	121.7	244.9
14.	30	Roman Koudelka	Czech Republic	93.0	11	-0.25	54.0	122.4	92.5	11	-0.34	54.0	122.3	244.7
15.	48	Daniel-André Tande	Norway	92.5	11	-0.12	53.5	119.7	94.5	11	-0.24	52.5	123.8	243.5
16.	33	Robert Johansson	Norway	93.5	11	0.11	54.0	120.1	94.5	11	0.06	54.0	122.5	242.6
17.	38	Andreas Stjernen	Norway	95.0	11	0.34	54.0	121.3	95.0	11	0.13	51.5	120.5	241.8
18.	4	Killian Peier	Switzerland	93.0	11	-0.15	52.5	120.0	93.0	11	-0.11	53.5	120.6	240.6
19.	40	Piotr Żyła	Poland	91.5	11	-0.26	52.5	118.0	94.0	11	-0.02	54.0	122.2	240.2
20.	29	Taku Takeuchi	Japan	94.5	11	0.22	54.0	121.2	91.5	11	-0.10	53.0	117.0	238.2
21.	27	Simon Ammann	Switzerland	91.5	11	-0.27	51.0	116.6	92.0	11	-0.29	52.0	118.8	235.4
22.	36	Evgenii Klimov	Russia	91.5	11	-0.06	52.0	115.6	90.5	11	-0.30	51.0	114.9	230.5
23.	25	Jakub Janda	Czech Republic	89.0	11	-0.25	52.5	112.9	90.0	11	-0.25	52.5	114.9	227.8
24.	26	Gregor Schlierenzauer	Austria	89.5	11	-0.36	52.5	115.0	90.0	11	0.06	52.5	112.0	227.0
25.	17	Janne Ahonen	Finland	90.5	11	-0.12	52.5	114.7	89.5	11	-0.01	52.5	111.6	226.3
26.	13	Ville Larinto	Finland	89.5	11	-0.28	51.0	112.7	90.0	11	-0.03	52.5	112.8	225.5
27.	9	Davide Bresadola	Italy	89.5	11	-0.07	51.0	110.7	90.5	11	-0.13	51.5	113.8	224.5
28.	31	Noriaki Kasai	Japan	90.0	11	0.06	52.5	112.0	89.0	11	0.10	52.5	109.7	221.7
29.	24	Denis Kornilov	Russia	92.5	11	0.42	51.5	113.1	86.0	11	-0.16	51.0	104.5	217.6
30.	12	Dmitriy Vassiliev	Russia	90.5	11	0.11	50.5	110.6	86.5	11	-0.13	49.5	103.8	214.4
31.	16	Viktor Polášek	Czech Republic	89.0	11	-0.13	50.0	109.3	NQ					109.3
32.	28	Jernej Damjan	Slovenia	88.0	11	-0.23	51.0	109.2	NQ					109.2
33.	10	Gregor Deschwanden	Switzerland	88.0	11	-0.17	51.0	108.6	NQ					108.6
34.	47	Domen Prevc	Slovenia	89.0	11	0.11	51.0	108.1	NQ					108.1
35.	18	Jarkko Määttä	Finland	88.0	11	-0.05	51.0	107.5	NQ					107.5
35.	15	Tomáš Vančura	Czech Republic	87.0	11	-0.21	51.5	107.5	NQ					107.5
37.	19	Sebastian Colloredo	Italy	88.5	11	0.09	51.0	107.3	NQ					107.3
38.	1	Antti Aalto	Finland	87.5	11	-0.11	51.0	107.1	NQ					107.1
39.	21	Mackenzie Boyd-Clowes	Canada	88.0	11	0.12	51.0	106.0	NQ					106.0
40.	11	Kento Sakuyama	Japan	87.5	11	0.04	51.0	105.7	NQ					105.7
41.	37	Vincent Descombes Sevoie	France	87.5	11	-0.05	50.0	105.5	NQ					105.5
42.	2	Vladimir Zografski	Bulgaria	88.0	11	0.35	52.0	105.2	NQ					105.2
43.	23	Cene Prevc	Slovenia	86.0	11	-0.17	50.5	104.1	NQ					104.1
44.	14	Alexey Romashov	Russia	86.0	11	-0.03	49.5	101.8	NQ					101.8
45.	5	Alex Insam	Italy	86.0	11	0.12	50.5	101.5	NQ					101.5
46.	3	Andreas Schuler	Switzerland	85.5	11	0.20	49.5	98.9	NQ					98.9
47.	20	Kevin Bickner	United States	83.5	11	-0.10	49.5	98.9	NQ					98.9
48.	7	Kaarel Nurmsalu	Estonia	83.0	11	-0.29	49.0	97.8	NQ					97.8
49.	8	Michael Glasder	United States	82.0	11	-0.10	49.5	94.5	NQ					94.5
50.	6	Paul Brasme	France	83.0	11	0.18	49.5	94.1	NQ					94.1

==== Qualification for the individual competition on the HS 130 hill (1 March 2017) ====
Position	Number	Athlete	Country	Jump			Style	Total score	Notes
Position	Number	Athlete	Country	Distance	Gate	Wind	Style	Total score	Notes
1.	15	Antti Aalto	Finland	128.5	10	1.08	50.0	123.4	q
2.	51	Andreas Stjernen	Norway	125.0	10	1.17	55.5	121.8	q
3.	45	Daiki Itō	Japan	121.5	10	1.02	55.0	116.3	q
4.	28	Viktor Polášek	Czech Republic	119.5	10	0.65	54.0	114.8	q
5.	38	Simon Ammann	Switzerland	124.0	10	0.99	48.5	114.5	q
6.	30	Jarkko Määttä	Finland	119.5	10	0.80	54.0	113.5	q
7.	25	Ville Larinto	Finland	117.5	10	0.33	52.5	112.4	q
8.	27	Tomáš Vančura	Czech Republic	118.0	10	0.74	54.0	111.3	q
9.	48	Dawid Kubacki	Poland	119.0	10	1.06	54.5	110.9	q
9.	44	Noriaki Kasai	Japan	119.0	10	0.95	53.5	110.9	q
11.	42	Anders Fannemel	Norway	116.5	10	0.39	52.5	110.1	q
12.	41	Taku Takeuchi	Japan	117.5	10	0.65	52.5	109.7	q
13.	13	Killian Peier	Switzerland	116.5	10	0.49	52.0	108.8	q
14.	20	Michael Glasder	United States	116.0	10	0.46	52.5	108.6	q
15.	33	Mackenzie Boyd-Clowes	Canada	115.0	10	0.32	52.0	107.5	q
16.	29	Janne Ahonen	Finland	116.0	10	0.52	50.5	106.1	q
17.	34	Johann André Forfang	Norway	114.5	10	0.63	52.5	104.5	q
18.	36	Jakub Janda	Czech Republic	114.0	10	0.43	51.5	104.3	q
19.	6	Alex Insam	Italy	116.0	10	0.87	51.5	104.1	q
20.	22	Gregor Deschwanden	Switzerland	114.0	10	0.46	51.5	104.0	q
21.	16	William Rhoads	United States	116.0	10	0.88	51.0	103.6	q
22.	37	Markus Schiffner	Austria	115.5	10	0.98	51.5	102.3	q
23.	47	Stephan Leyhe	Germany	113.5	10	0.70	52.0	101.6	q
24.	24	Dmitriy Vassiliev	Russia	113.0	10	0.48	51.0	101.5	q
25.	40	Jernej Damjan	Slovenia	113.5	10	0.73	52.0	101.3	q
26.	35	Denis Kornilov	Russia	110.5	10	0.26	50.5	98.4	q
27.	52	Richard Freitag	Germany	114.5	10	1.24	51.0	97.8	q
27.	50	Vincent Descombes Sevoie	France	114.0	10	1.19	51.5	97.8	q
29.	19	Kaarel Nurmsalu	Estonia	111.0	10	0.55	51.0	97.3	q
30.	39	Anže Lanišek	Slovenia	109.5	10	0.31	51.5	97.2	q
31.	31	Sebastian Colloredo	Italy	111.0	10	0.76	51.0	95.6	q
32.	21	Davide Bresadola	Italy	108.5	10	0.15	49.5	94.7	q
33.	3	Casey Larson	United States	108.5	10	0.61	49.0	90.3	q
34.	32	Kevin Bickner	United States	108.0	10	0.64	49.5	89.7	q
35.	8	Martti Nõmme	Estonia	108.5	10	0.82	49.5	89.9	q
36.	46	Jurij Tepeš	Slovenia	107.0	10	0.59	49.5	88.3	q
37.	26	Alexey Romashov	Russia	106.0	10	0.51	49.0	86.7	q
38.	11	Andreas Schuler	Switzerland	107.0	10	0.93	49.5	85.4	q
39.	49	Evgenii Klimov	Russia	105.5	10	0.77	49.5	84.1	q
40.	23	Kento Sakuyama	Japan	102.5	10	0.17	48.5	82.8	q
41.	5	Artti Aigro	Estonia	102.5	10	0.48	47.5	78.2	nq
42.	43	Roman Koudelka	Czech Republic	98.5	10	0.59	48.5	72.0	nq
43.	4	Ilia Kratov	Kazakhstan	93.0	10	0.46	45.5	60.2	nq
44.	17	Fatih Arda İpcioğlu	Turkey	95.0	10	1.02	46.5	60.1	nq
45.	7	Nikolay Karpenko	Kazakhstan	92.0	10	0.82	46.5	56.4	nq
46.	18	Alexey Korolev	Kazakhstan	88.5	10	0.69	47.0	51.7	nq
47.	2	Vitaliy Kalinichenko	Ukraine	88.0	10	0.72	46.0	49.5	nq
48.	10	Roman Nogin	Kazakhstan	82.5	10	0.94	45.0	36.7	nq
49.	1	Artur Sarkisiani	Georgia	72.0	10	1.09	44.5	16.1	nq
–	53	Piotr Żyła	Poland	121.5	10	0.73	–		pq
–	54	Peter Prevc	Slovenia	127.5	10	0.48	–		pq
–	55	Markus Eisenbichler	Germany	105.5	10	0.59	–		pq
–	56	Manuel Fettner	Austria	121.5	10	1.13	–		pq
–	57	Michael Hayböck	Austria	110.5	10	1.03	–		pq
–	58	Andreas Wellinger	Germany	114.0	10	1.26	–		pq
–	59	Maciej Kot	Poland	115.0	10	1.44	–		pq
–	60	Daniel-André Tande	Norway	113.5	10	1.26	–		pq
–	61	Stefan Kraft	Austria	118.5	10	0.81	–		pq
–	62	Kamil Stoch	Poland	113.5	10	0.60	–		pq
–	9	Joshua Maurer	Canada	DSQ					
–	12	Vladimir Zografski	Bulgaria	DSQ					
–	14	Kristaps Nežborts	Latvia	DSQ					

==== Individual competition on the HS 130 hill (2 March 2017) ====
Position	Number	Athlete	Country	1st round					2nd round					Total score
Position	Number	Athlete	Country	Jump			Style	Score	Jump			Style	Score	Total score
Position	Number	Athlete	Country	Distance	Gate	Wind	Style	Score	Distance	Gate	Wind	Style	Score	Total score
1.	49	Stefan Kraft	Austria	127.5	9	-0.23	56.5	139.6	127.5	9	-0.15	57.5	139.7	279.3
2.	46	Andreas Wellinger	Germany	127.5	9	-0.24	55.5	138.7	129.0	9	-0.04	55.5	139.3	278.0
3.	41	Piotr Żyła	Poland	127.5	9	0.16	55.5	134.8	131.0	9	0.25	57.0	141.9	276.7
4.	39	Andreas Stjernen	Norway	129.5	9	0.39	56.0	137.0	129.0	9	0.15	57.0	139.9	276.1
5.	31	Anders Fannemel	Norway	123.5	9	-0.29	55.0	131.5	127.0	9	-0.24	55.0	137.3	268.8
6.	47	Maciej Kot	Poland	123.5	9	-0.18	55.0	130.3	126.5	9	-0.21	55.5	136.6	266.9
7.	50	Kamil Stoch	Poland	127.5	9	-0.10	55.0	136.7	124.5	9	0.26	55.0	128.1	264.8
8.	36	Dawid Kubacki	Poland	128.5	9	0.16	55.5	136.6	123.0	9	-0.01	54.5	127.2	263.8
9.	42	Peter Prevc	Slovenia	128.0	9	0.24	55.0	134.6	124.5	9	0.20	55.5	129.9	263.7
10.	48	Daniel-André Tande	Norway	121.5	9	0.23	54.0	122.0	129.5	9	0.00	55.0	139.3	261.3
11.	45	Michael Hayböck	Austria	121.5	9	-0.02	54.0	124.1	128.0	9	0.17	56.0	136.2	260.3
12.	23	Johann André Forfang	Norway	127.0	9	0.21	54.5	132.5	122.5	9	-0.17	54.0	127.4	259.9
13.	43	Markus Eisenbichler	Germany	125.5	9	0.06	54.0	130.6	123.5	9	0.01	54.0	127.4	258.0
14.	27	Simon Ammann	Switzerland	122.5	9	-0.16	52.5	125.8	125.5	9	-0.14	48.5	127.0	252.8
15.	33	Daiki Itō	Japan	122.0	9	-0.17	54.5	127.0	120.0	9	-0.05	54.0	121.7	248.7
16.	35	Stephan Leyhe	Germany	125.0	9	-0.05	55.5	132.2	117.5	9	0.08	53.0	115.0	247.2
17.	30	Taku Takeuchi	Japan	122.0	9	0.12	54.0	123.8	121.0	9	0.24	54.0	121.0	244.8
18.	44	Manuel Fettner	Austria	118.0	9	-0.07	52.5	116.8	122.5	9	0.04	54.5	125.9	242.7
19.	40	Richard Freitag	Germany	121.0	9	-0.15	54.0	124.5	115.5	9	0.05	52.5	111.2	235.7
20.	37	Evgenii Klimov	Russia	120.0	9	0.37	53.0	117.1	117.5	9	-0.20	52.5	117.2	234.3
21.	29	Jernej Damjan	Slovenia	113.5	9	-0.44	51.0	111.0	120.0	9	-0.15	52.5	121.2	232.2
22.	26	Markus Schiffner	Austria	120.0	9	-0.22	52.0	121.5	113.5	9	0.09	51.0	105.7	227.2
23.	18	Janne Ahonen	Finland	115.0	9	0.12	52.5	111.9	116.0	9	0.12	52.5	113.7	225.6
24.	13	Dmitriy Vassiliev	Russia	120.0	9	0.56	52.5	115.0	115.0	9	-0.07	50.5	110.3	225.3
25.	17	Viktor Polášek	Czech Republic	116.0	9	-0.29	51.0	114.0	115.5	9	-0.09	51.0	111.0	225.0
26.	14	Ville Larinto	Finland	118.0	9	0.32	52.5	113.4	115.5	9	0.05	52.5	111.2	224.6
27.	19	Jarkko Määttä	Finland	116.0	9	0.14	51.0	109.8	117.5	9	0.24	52.0	112.7	222.5
28.	25	Jakub Janda	Czech Republic	118.5	9	0.14	52.5	115.8	111.0	9	-0.25	50.0	103.6	219.4
29.	24	Denis Kornilov	Russia	119.5	9	0.39	51.0	114.0	108.5	9	-0.01	48.5	95.1	209.9
30.	21	Kevin Bickner	United States	117.0	9	0.06	50.5	111.8	104.0	9	-0.84	48.5	95.5	207.3
31.	6	Antti Aalto	Finland	115.0	9	-0.01	51.0	109.3	NQ					109.3
32.	32	Noriaki Kasai	Japan	114.0	9	-0.07	51.0	108.1	NQ					108.1
33.	38	Vincent Descombes Sevoie	France	114.0	9	0.14	50.0	105.2	NQ					105.2
34.	34	Jurij Tepeš	Slovenia	111.5	9	-0.12	51.0	104.1	NQ					104.1
35.	11	Gregor Deschwanden	Switzerland	112.5	9	0.28	51.0	102.3	NQ					102.3
36.	28	Anže Lanišek	Slovenia	110.0	9	0.00	50.5	99.7	NQ					99.7
37.	2	Alex Insam	Italy	107.0	9	-0.41	49.5	97.5	NQ					97.5
38.	22	Mackenzie Boyd-Clowes	Canada	108.0	9	0.12	50.0	94.6	NQ					94.6
39.	7	William Rhoads	United States	107.0	9	-0.08	48.5	93.1	NQ					93.1
40.	9	Michael Glasder	United States	106.0	9	-0.09	49.5	92.4	NQ					92.4
40.	5	Killian Peier	Switzerland	106.5	9	0.00	49.5	92.4	NQ					92.4
42.	16	Tomáš Vančura	Czech Republic	104.5	9	-0.28	49.5	91.7	NQ					91.7
43.	20	Sebastian Colloredo	Italy	107.0	9	0.40	49.5	89.9	NQ					89.9
44.	3	Martti Nõmme	Estonia	106.0	9	0.16	48.5	89.9	NQ					89.9
45.	8	Kaarel Nurmsalu	Estonia	103.5	9	-0.19	48.0	87.4	NQ					87.4
46.	1	Casey Larson	United States	102.5	9	-0.25	48.0	86.3	NQ					86.3
47.	4	Andreas Schuler	Switzerland	103.0	9	0.03	48.0	84.3	NQ					84.3
48.	10	Davide Bresadola	Italy	101.5	9	-0.24	47.0	83.4	NQ					83.4
49.	15	Alexey Romashov	Russia	102.0	9	-0.05	48.0	83.3	NQ					83.3
50.	12	Kento Sakuyama	Japan	102.0	9	0.05	47.5	81.9	NQ					81.9

==== Team competition on the HS 130 hill (4 March 2017) ====
Position	Number	Country	Athlete	1st round					2nd round					Total score
Position	Number	Country	Athlete	Jump			Style	Score	Jump			Style	Score	Total score
Position	Number	Country	Athlete	Distance	Gate	Wind	Style	Score	Distance	Gate	Wind	Style	Score	Total score
1.	12-1	Poland	Piotr Żyła	130.5	9	-0.04	52.0	143.4	123.0	8	-0.17	54.0	128.3	1104.2
1.	12-2	Poland	Dawid Kubacki	129.0	9	0.07	55.5	143.2	119.5	7	0.10	54.0	124.4	1104.2
1.	12-3	Poland	Maciej Kot	130.5	9	-0.38	57.0	151.9	121.5	8	-0.03	54.0	124.2	1104.2
1.	12-4	Poland	Kamil Stoch	130.5	8	-0.05	57.0	153.4	124.5	8	-0.60	54.0	135.4	1104.2
2.	8-1	Norway	Anders Fannemel	131.0	10	0.06	54.5	141.0	112.5	8	-0.69	51.0	111.8	1078.5
2.	8-2	Norway	Johann André Forfang	126.5	9	-0.01	54.0	137.9	138.0	9	0.91	49.5	136.6	1078.5
2.	8-3	Norway	Daniel-André Tande	126.0	9	-0.13	55.5	139.7	126.0	8	0.10	54.0	131.2	1078.5
2.	8-4	Norway	Andreas Stjernen	127.5	8	0.04	55.5	145.7	125.5	8	-0.20	55.5	134.6	1078.5
3.	11-1	Austria	Michael Hayböck	130.0	10	-0.02	55.5	140.9	118.5	8	-0.16	53.0	119.9	1068.9
3.	11-2	Austria	Manuel Fettner	126.5	9	0.04	54.0	137.5	121.0	7	0.47	52.5	122.4	1068.9
3.	11-3	Austria	Gregor Schlierenzauer	124.0	9	-0.12	54.0	134.5	113.5	8	-0.46	51.0	111.2	1068.9
3.	11-4	Austria	Stefan Kraft	134.0	8	-0.09	58.5	161.6	126.0	8	-0.70	56.5	141.7	1068.9
4.	10-1	Germany	Markus Eisenbichler	130.5	10	-0.08	53.5	140.4	130.5	8	-0.06	54.0	140.7	1052.9
4.	10-2	Germany	Stephan Leyhe	124.5	9	-0.05	54.0	134.7	103.5	7	0.22	49.0	89.5	1052.9
4.	10-3	Germany	Richard Freitag	128.5	9	-0.27	55.0	145.2	124.0	8	0.25	54.0	126.3	1052.9
4.	10-4	Germany	Andreas Wellinger	130.5	8	-0.19	55.0	152.8	119.0	8	-0.48	53.0	123.3	1052.9
5.	9-1	Slovenia	Jurij Tepeš	123.5	10	-0.04	38.5	112.4	106.5	8	-0.26	49.5	95.1	941.6
5.	9-2	Slovenia	Anže Lanišek	121.0	9	-0.24	53.5	129.9	112.0	7	0.22	51.0	106.8	941.6
5.	9-3	Slovenia	Jernej Damjan	120.0	9	-0.33	53.0	128.5	113.0	8	0.15	50.5	103.8	941.6
5.	9-4	Slovenia	Peter Prevc	127.5	8	-0.01	55.5	146.1	117.5	8	-0.27	53.5	119.0	941.6
6.	4-1	Finland	Jarkko Määttä	120.5	10	0.05	53.5	121.2	117.0	8	-0.08	51.5	114.1	926.5
6.	4-2	Finland	Ville Larinto	114.0	9	-0.03	51.5	113.1	117.0	9	-0.11	51.5	109.6	926.5
6.	4-3	Finland	Antti Aalto	122.0	9	-0.17	52.5	129.9	114.5	8	-0.15	51.0	109.8	926.5
6.	4-4	Finland	Janne Ahonen	116.0	8	-0.01	51.5	121.4	112.0	8	-0.35	51.0	107.4	926.5
7.	6-1	Japan	Taku Takeuchi	120.0	10	0.10	53.0	119.4	115.5	8	-0.03	52.5	111.9	922.7
7.	6-2	Japan	Ryōyū Kobayashi	114.5	9	-0.12	50.5	113.9	119.0	9	0.04	52.5	112.8	922.7
7.	6-3	Japan	Noriaki Kasai	119.0	9	-0.10	53.5	124.8	105.0	8	-0.31	49.5	92.9	922.7
7.	6-4	Japan	Daiki Itō	119.0	8	-0.13	53.0	129.5	114.0	8	-0.94	51.5	117.5	922.7
7.	5-1	Czech Republic	Viktor Polášek	125.0	10	0.06	54.0	129.7	117.0	8	0.10	51.0	112.0	922.7
7.	5-2	Czech Republic	Tomáš Vančura	114.5	9	-0.05	52.0	114.7	109.0	9	0.08	50.5	92.4	922.7
7.	5-3	Czech Republic	Jakub Janda	120.0	9	-0.07	53.5	126.3	115.5	8	0.31	52.0	108.5	922.7
7.	5-4	Czech Republic	Roman Koudelka	119.5	8	-0.04	51.5	128.0	113.0	8	-0.39	52.5	111.1	922.7
9.	7-1	Russia	Alexey Romashov	118.5	10	0.04	52.0	116.2	NQ					473.4
9.	7-2	Russia	Denis Kornilov	113.0	9	-0.09	48.0	108.4	NQ					473.4
9.	7-3	Russia	Dmitriy Vassiliev	118.0	9	-0.15	51.0	121.0	NQ					473.4
9.	7-4	Russia	Evgenii Klimov	118.5	8	-0.10	52.5	127.8	NQ					473.4
10.	3-1	Switzerland	Gregor Deschwanden	114.5	10	0.15	49.5	105.5	NQ					453.0
10.	3-2	Switzerland	Andreas Schuler	106.0	9	-0.07	49.0	96.6	NQ					453.0
10.	3-3	Switzerland	Killian Peier	114.0	9	-0.12	51.5	114.0	NQ					453.0
10.	3-4	Switzerland	Simon Ammann	123.5	8	-0.11	52.5	136.9	NQ					453.0
11.	2-1	United States	Casey Larson	93.0	10	0.03	46.5	64.8	NQ					365.1
11.	2-2	United States	William Rhoads	107.0	9	-0.14	49.0	99.9	NQ					365.1
11.	2-3	United States	Michael Glasder	108.0	9	-0.10	49.5	101.0	NQ					365.1
11.	2-4	United States	Kevin Bickner	105.5	8	-0.13	48.0	100.2	NQ					365.1
12.	1-1	Kazakhstan	Roman Nogin	75.0	10	0.10	44.0	29.4	NQ					192.3
12.	1-2	Kazakhstan	Alexey Korolev	83.5	9	-0.08	46.0	53.2	NQ					192.3
12.	1-3	Kazakhstan	Nikolay Karpenko	81.0	9	-0.10	42.5	45.4	NQ					192.3
12.	1-4	Kazakhstan	Ilia Kratov	87.5	8	-0.08	45.0	64.3	NQ					192.3

=== Mixed competition ===
==== Mixed competition on the HS 100 hill (26 February 2017) ====
Position	Number	Country	Athlete	1st round					2nd round					Total score
Position	Number	Country	Athlete	Jump			Style	Score	Jump			Style	Score	Total score
Position	Number	Country	Athlete	Distance	Gate	Wind	Style	Score	Distance	Gate	Wind	Style	Score	Total score
1.	14-1	Germany	Carina Vogt	98.0	18	0.10	54.0	129.2	95.0	18	-0.26	53.5	126.0	1035.5
1.	14-2	Germany	Markus Eisenbichler	95.5	12	-0.20	54.0	126.9	99.5	13	-0.27	55.5	137.1	1035.5
1.	14-3	Germany	Svenja Würth	95.0	18	-0.21	48.0	120.0	95.5	18	-0.32	46.0	120.1	1035.5
1.	14-4	Germany	Andreas Wellinger	99.0	12	0.19	56.0	132.5	98.0	12	-0.78	55.5	143.7	1035.5
2.	13-1	Austria	Daniela Iraschko-Stolz	88.5	18	-0.44	52.0	113.3	90.5	18	-0.33	52.5	116.7	999.3
2.	13-2	Austria	Michael Hayböck	92.0	12	-0.11	52.5	117.6	97.5	13	-0.28	54.0	131.7	999.3
2.	13-3	Austria	Jacqueline Seifriedsberger	94.5	18	-0.27	54.0	125.6	92.5	18	-0.25	54.0	121.4	999.3
2.	13-4	Austria	Stefan Kraft	96.5	12	-0.59	55.5	134.2	97.0	12	-0.49	55.5	138.8	999.3
3.	11-1	Japan	Sara Takanashi	90.0	18	-0.91	50.5	119.3	89.5	18	-0.86	51.0	118.3	979.7
3.	11-2	Japan	Taku Takeuchi	89.0	12	-0.91	49.5	116.3	92.0	13	-0.55	51.5	120.8	979.7
3.	11-3	Japan	Yūki Itō	95.0	18	-0.14	54.0	125.4	93.5	18	-0.46	53.5	125.0	979.7
3.	11-4	Japan	Daiki Itō	92.5	12	-0.23	54.0	121.2	96.5	12	-0.08	55.0	133.4	979.7
4.	12-1	Slovenia	Nika Križnar	84.0	18	-0.94	49.0	106.1	90.5	18	-0.53	50.0	116.1	961.4
4.	12-2	Slovenia	Anže Lanišek	93.5	12	-0.30	54.0	123.9	96.5	13	-0.02	55.5	128.7	961.4
4.	12-3	Slovenia	Ema Klinec	92.5	18	-0.11	52.5	118.6	91.5	18	-0.49	52.5	120.2	961.4
4.	12-4	Slovenia	Peter Prevc	88.0	12	-0.43	51.5	111.7	97.5	12	-0.21	54.5	136.1	961.4
5.	10-1	Norway	Silje Opseth	80.5	18	-0.51	49.5	95.4	67.5	18	-0.28	46.0	63.7	877.8
5.	10-2	Norway	Daniel-André Tande	91.0	12	0.06	52.5	114.0	95.0	13	-0.15	54.0	125.5	877.8
5.	10-3	Norway	Maren Lundby	90.5	18	-0.32	52.5	116.6	93.5	18	-0.14	52.5	120.9	877.8
5.	10-4	Norway	Andreas Stjernen	91.5	12	-0.13	52.5	116.8	91.0	12	-0.60	52.5	124.9	877.8
6.	9-1	Russia	Anastasiya Barannikova	85.5	18	-0.19	48.0	100.8	87.0	18	-0.15	49.5	105.0	864.0
6.	9-2	Russia	Denis Kornilov	89.5	12	0.01	52.5	111.4	92.5	13	0.03	52.5	117.3	864.0
6.	9-3	Russia	Irina Avvakumova	85.5	18	0.01	51.0	101.9	85.0	18	-0.23	49.5	101.7	864.0
6.	9-4	Russia	Evgenii Klimov	85.5	12	-0.71	50.0	107.9	88.0	12	-0.66	51.0	118.0	864.0
7.	5-1	Italy	Elena Runggaldier	87.0	18	0.24	50.5	102.6	80.5	18	-0.41	48.5	93.5	848.1
7.	5-2	Italy	Sebastian Colloredo	89.0	12	-0.10	52.0	111.0	83.0	13	-0.73	50.5	103.6	848.1
7.	5-3	Italy	Manuela Malsiner	88.5	18	-0.20	48.5	107.4	87.0	18	0.09	49.5	102.8	848.1
7.	5-4	Italy	Davide Bresadola	85.5	12	-0.95	51.0	111.2	88.0	12	-0.45	51.0	116.0	848.1
8.	7-1	United States	Nita Englund	79.5	18	-0.42	49.5	92.6	75.5	18	-0.67	45.5	83.0	802.2
8.	7-2	United States	Michael Glasder	80.5	12	-0.59	49.5	96.2	83.0	13	-0.49	50.0	100.7	802.2
8.	7-3	United States	Sarah Hendrickson	85.0	18	-0.50	50.5	105.3	84.0	18	-0.27	50.5	101.1	802.2
8.	7-4	United States	Kevin Bickner	88.5	12	-0.18	51.0	109.7	89.0	12	-0.05	50.5	113.6	802.2
9.	6-1	Czech Republic	Marta Křepelková	76.0	18	-0.13	48.0	81.3	NQ					403.3
9.	6-2	Czech Republic	Jakub Janda	88.0	12	-0.38	51.0	110.7	NQ					403.3
9.	6-3	Czech Republic	Barbora Blažková	77.0	18	-0.96	45.0	88.3	NQ					403.3
9.	6-4	Czech Republic	Roman Koudelka	94.0	12	-0.10	54.0	123.0	NQ					403.3
10.	8-1	France	Léa Lemare	84.5	18	-0.39	50.5	103.3	NQ					403.1
10.	8-2	France	Paul Brasme	82.0	12	-0.29	50.5	97.3	NQ					403.1
10.	8-3	France	Lucile Morat	84.0	18	-0.28	50.5	100.7	NQ					403.1
10.	8-4	France	Vincent Descombes Sevoie	84.0	12	-0.55	48.5	101.8	NQ					403.1
11.	4-1	Finland	Susanna Forsström	79.0	18	0.42	46.0	80.6	NQ					397.4
11.	4-2	Finland	Ville Larinto	88.5	12	-0.32	52.5	112.6	NQ					397.4
11.	4-3	Finland	Julia Kykkänen	78.5	18	-0.12	49.5	87.7	NQ					397.4
11.	4-4	Finland	Janne Ahonen	90.5	12	-0.31	52.5	116.5	NQ					397.4
12.	3-1	Canada	Natasha Bodnarchuk	76.0	18	-0.04	48.0	80.4	NQ					379.5
12.	3-2	Canada	Joshua Maurer	80.0	12	-0.34	47.0	90.3	NQ					379.5
12.	3-3	Canada	Taylor Henrich	85.5	18	-0.07	50.5	102.2	NQ					379.5
12.	3-4	Canada	Mackenzie Boyd-Clowes	88.0	12	0.05	51.0	106.6	NQ					379.5
13.	2-1	Romania	Diana Trâmbițaș	67.0	18	-0.40	43.5	61.4	NQ					336.2
13.	2-2	Romania	Sorin Iulian Pîtea	82.0	12	-0.44	50.5	98.8	NQ					336.2
13.	2-3	Romania	Daniela Haralambie	80.0	18	-0.53	47.5	92.6	NQ					336.2
13.	2-4	Romania	Sorin Mitrofan	76.5	12	-0.40	46.5	83.4	NQ					336.2
14.	1-1	Kazakhstan	Dajana Achmietwalijewa	53.5	18	-0.45	39.5	30.9	NQ					258.4
14.	1-2	Kazakhstan	Ilia Kratov	82.0	12	-0.15	49.0	94.5	NQ					258.4
14.	1-3	Kazakhstan	Walentina Sdierżykowa	62.0	18	-0.56	42.0	51.4	NQ					258.4
14.	1-4	Kazakhstan	Alexey Korolev	77.0	12	0.05	48.0	81.6	NQ					258.4

== Team line-ups ==
Women's teams
Athlete	Date of birth	2015 World Championships results				2017 World Championships results
Athlete	Date of birth	Individual normal hill		Mixed team		Individual normal hill		Mixed team
Austria (3)
Chiara Hölzl	18 July 1997	16.		–		10.		–
Daniela Iraschko-Stolz	21 November 1983	3.		4.		9.		2.
Jacqueline Seifriedsberger	20 January 1991	7.		4.		7.		2.
China (4)
Chang Xinyue	13 February 1994	38.		–		35.		–
Li Xueyao	11 April 1995	37.		–		28.		–
Liu Qi	27 February 1996	q		–		q		–
Ma Tong	2 March 1994	q		–		q		–
Czech Republic (3)
Barbora Blažková	23 September 1997	39.		11.		32.		9.
Marta Křepelková	18 June 1991	–				38.		9.
Jana Mrákotová	24 July 1999	–				q		–
Finland (3)
Susanna Forsström	19 April 1995	40.		10.		q		11.
Julia Kykkänen	17 April 1994	23.		10.		19.		11.
Jenny Rautionaho	26 July 1996	–				q		–
France (2)
Léa Lemare	21 June 1996	32.		8.		20.		10.
Lucile Morat	15 June 2001	–				24.		10.
Japan (4)
Yuki Ito	10 May 1994	2.		3.		2.		3.
Kaori Iwabuchi	28 April 1993	36.		–		11.		–
Yūka Setō	22 February 1997	31.		–		14.		–
Sara Takanashi	8 October 1996	4.		3.		3.		3.
Canada (3)
Natasha Bodnarchuk	13 June 1998	–				40.		12.
Taylor Henrich	1 November 1995	5.		–		16.		12.
Nicole Maurer	28 January 2000	–				39.		–
Kazakhstan (2)
Dajana Achmietwalijewa	21 December 1997	–				q		14.
Walentina Sdierżykowa	30 January 2001	–				q		14.
Latvia (1)
Šarlote Šķēle	29 March 2001	–				q		–
Germany (5)
Katharina Althaus	23 May 1996	17.		1.		8.		–
Gianina Ernst	31 December 1998	–				25.		–
Ramona Straub	19 September 1993	–				33.		–
Carina Vogt	5 February 1992	1.		1.		1.		1.
Svenja Würth	20 August 1993	–				6.		1.
Norway (3)
Maren Lundby	7 September 1994	15.		2.		4.		5.
Anniken Mork	16 January 1991	–				36.		–
Silje Opseth	28 April 1999	–				31.		5.
Russia (5)
Irina Avvakumova	14 September 1991	11.		6.		12.		6.
Anastasiya Barannikova	27 November 1987	–				21.		6.
Ksenia Kablukova	16 June 1998	–				30.		–
Aleksandra Kustova	26 August 1998	–				–		–
Sofia Tikhonova	16 November 1998	20.		6.		26.		–
Romania (2)
Daniela Haralambie	14 August 1997	–				29.		13.
Diana Trâmbițaș	31 May 2000	–				q		13.
Slovenia (5)
Urša Bogataj	7 March 1995	–				–		–
Ema Klinec	2 July 1998	–				5.		4.
Nika Križnar	9 March 2000	–				13.		4.
Špela Rogelj	8 November 1994	10.		5.		22.		–
Maja Vtič	27 January 1988	13.		5.		17.		–
United States (2)
Nita Englund	10 June 1992	12.		7.		27.		8.
Sarah Hendrickson	1 August 1994	6.		7.		23.		8.
Italy (4)
Evelyn Insam	10 February 1994	33.		9.		33.		–
Lara Malsiner	14 April 2000	–				37.		–
Manuela Malsiner	15 December 1997	–				15.		7.
Elena Runggaldier	10 July 1990	30.		9.		18.		7.
Men's teams
Athlete	Date of birth	2015 World Championships results				2017 World Championships results
Athlete	Date of birth	Individual normal hill	Individual large hill	Team large hill	Mixed team	Individual normal hill	Individual large hill	Team large hill	Mixed team
Austria (6)
Manuel Fettner	17 June 1985	–				12.	18.	3.	–
Michael Hayböck	5 March 1991	21.	14.	2.	4.	6.	11.	3.	2.
Andreas Kofler	17 May 1984	–				–
Stefan Kraft	13 May 1993	3.	5.	2.	4.	1.	1.	3.	2.
Markus Schiffner	5 June 1992	–				–	22.	–
Gregor Schlierenzauer	7 January 1990	22.	2.	2.	–	24.	–	3.	–
Bulgaria (1)
Vladimir Zografski	14 July 1993	30.	47.	–		42.	q	–
Czech Republic (6)
Lukáš Hlava	10 September 1984	32.	–	8.	–	–
Jakub Janda	27 April 1978	28.	33.	8.	–	23.	28.	7.	9.
Roman Koudelka	9 July 1989	4.	8.	8.	–	14.	q	7.	9.
Jan Matura	29 January 1980	38.	16.	8.	11.	–
Viktor Polášek	18 July 1997	–	q	–	11.	31.	25.	7.	–
Tomáš Vančura	10 September 1996	–				35.	42.	7.	–
Estonia (3)
Artti Aigro	29 August 1999	–				q	q	–
Martti Nõmme	7 August 1993	q	48.	–		q	44.	–
Kaarel Nurmsalu	30 April 1991	–				48.	45.	–
Finland (5)
Antti Aalto	2 April 1995	–				38.	31.	6.	–
Janne Ahonen	11 May 1977	15.	19.	9.	10.	25.	23.	6.	11.
Lauri Asikainen	28 May 1989	39.	39.	9.	–	–
Ville Larinto	11 April 1990	47.	–	9.	–	26.	26.	6.	11.
Jarkko Määttä	28 December 1994	34.	22.	9.	10.	35.	27.	6.	–
France (2)
Paul Brasme	7 November 1997	–				50.	–		10.
Vincent Descombes Sevoie	9 January 1984	29.	34.	–	5.	41.	33.	–	10.
Georgia (1)
Artur Sarkisiani	29 August 1996	–				q	q	–
Japan (5)
Daiki Itō	27 December 1985	12.	28.	4.	–	10.	15.	7.	3.
Noriaki Kasai	6 June 1972	35.	11.	4.	3.	28.	32.	7.	3.
Ryōyū Kobayashi	8 November 1996	–				–		7.	–
Kento Sakuyama	3 July 1990	–				40.	50.	–
Taku Takeuchi	20 May 1987	5.	24.	4.	3.	20.	17.	7.	–
Canada (2)
Mackenzie Boyd-Clowes	13 July 1991	–				39.	38.	–	12.
Joshua Maurer	20 September 1996	–				q	q	–	12.
Kazakhstan (4)
Nikolay Karpenko	10 August 1981	–				q	q	12.	–
Alexey Korolev	20 June 1987	–				q	q	12.	14.
Ilia Kratov	20 May 2000	–				q	q	12.	14.
Roman Nogin	23 June 1998	–				q	q	12.	–
Latvia (1)
Kristaps Nežborts	24 September 1997	q	–			q	q	–
Germany (5)
Markus Eisenbichler	3 April 1991	–	10.	5.	–	3.	13.	4.	1.
Richard Freitag	14 August 1991	7.	15.	5.	1.	9.	19.	4.	–
Karl Geiger	11 February 1993	–				–
Stephan Leyhe	5 January 1992	–				13.	16.	4.	–
Andreas Wellinger	28 August 1995	11.	DNS	–		2.	2.	4.	1.
Norway (6)
Anders Fannemel	13 May 1991	9.	7.	1.	2.	–	5.	2.	–
Johann André Forfang	4 July 1995	DSQ	18.	–	–	7.	12.	2.	–
Tom Hilde	22 September 1987	–				–
Robert Johansson	23 March 1990	–				16.	–
Andreas Stjernen	30 July 1988	–				17.	4.	2.	5.
Daniel-André Tande	24 January 1994	–				15.	10.	2.	5.
Poland (6)
Stefan Hula	29 September 1986	–				–
Maciej Kot	9 June 1991	–				5.	6.	1.	–
Dawid Kubacki	12 March 1990	–	29.	–		8.	8.	1.	–
Kamil Stoch	25 May 1987	17.	12.	3.	–	4.	7.	1.	–
Jan Ziobro	24 June 1991	8.	–	3.	–	–
Piotr Żyła	16 January 1987	33.	9.	3.	–	19.	3.	1.	–
Russia (6)
Evgenii Klimov	3 February 1994	–	35.	–		22.	20.	9.	6.
Denis Kornilov	17 August 1986	–	27.	7.	–	29.	29.	9.	6.
Alexey Romashov	29 April 1992	–				44.	49.	9.	–
Maksim Siergieyev	16 June 1999	–				–
Roman Trofimov	19 November 1989	–				–
Dmitriy Vassiliev	26 December 1979	40.	21.	7.	–	30.	24.	9.	–
Romania (2)
Sorin Mitrofan	26 March 1999	–				q	–		13.
Sorin Iulian Pîtea	9 July 1997	–				q	–		13.
Slovenia (6)
Jernej Damjan	28 May 1983	23.	25.	6.	–	32.	21.	5.	–
Anže Lanišek	20 April 1996	–				–	36.	5.	4.
Cene Prevc	12 March 1996	–				43.	–
Domen Prevc	4 June 1999	–				34.	–
Peter Prevc	20 September 1992	13.	4.	6.	5.	11.	9.	5.	4.
Jurij Tepeš	14 June 1989	41.	–	6.	–	–	34.	5.	–
United States (4)
Kevin Bickner	23 September 1996	–				47.	30.	11.	8.
Michael Glasder	27 March 1989	–	46.	–		49.	40.	11.	8.
Casey Larson	16 December 1998	–				q	46.	11.	–
William Rhoads	8 June 1995	DSQ	q	–	7.	q	39.	11.	–
Switzerland (5)
Simon Ammann	25 June 1981	16.	23.	10.	–	21.	14.	10.	–
Gregor Deschwanden	27 February 1991	14.	17.	10.	–	33.	35.	10.	–
Gabriel Karlen	10 March 1994	–		10.	–	–
Killian Peier	28 March 1995	31.	30.	10.	–	18.	40.	10.	–
Andreas Schuler	30 December 1995	–				46.	47.	10.	–
Turkey (1)
Fatih Arda İpcioğlu	28 September 1997	–				q	q	–
Ukraine (2)
Vitaliy Kalinichenko	9 August 1993	q	q	–		q	q	–
Stepan Pasicznyk	9 January 1998	q	q	–		q	–
Italy (3)
Davide Bresadola	10 September 1988	37.	36.	12.	9.	27.	48.	–	7.
Sebastian Colloredo	9 September 1987	44.	42.	12.	9.	37.	43.	–	7.
Alex Insam	19 December 1997	–				45.	37.	–	–

Legend:

q – Athlete did not qualify for the main competition;
DNS – Athlete did not start in the main competition;
– – Athlete was not entered for qualifications (individual competition) or for the team (team competition).
