= Ksenia Kablukova =

Russian ski jumper (born 1998)

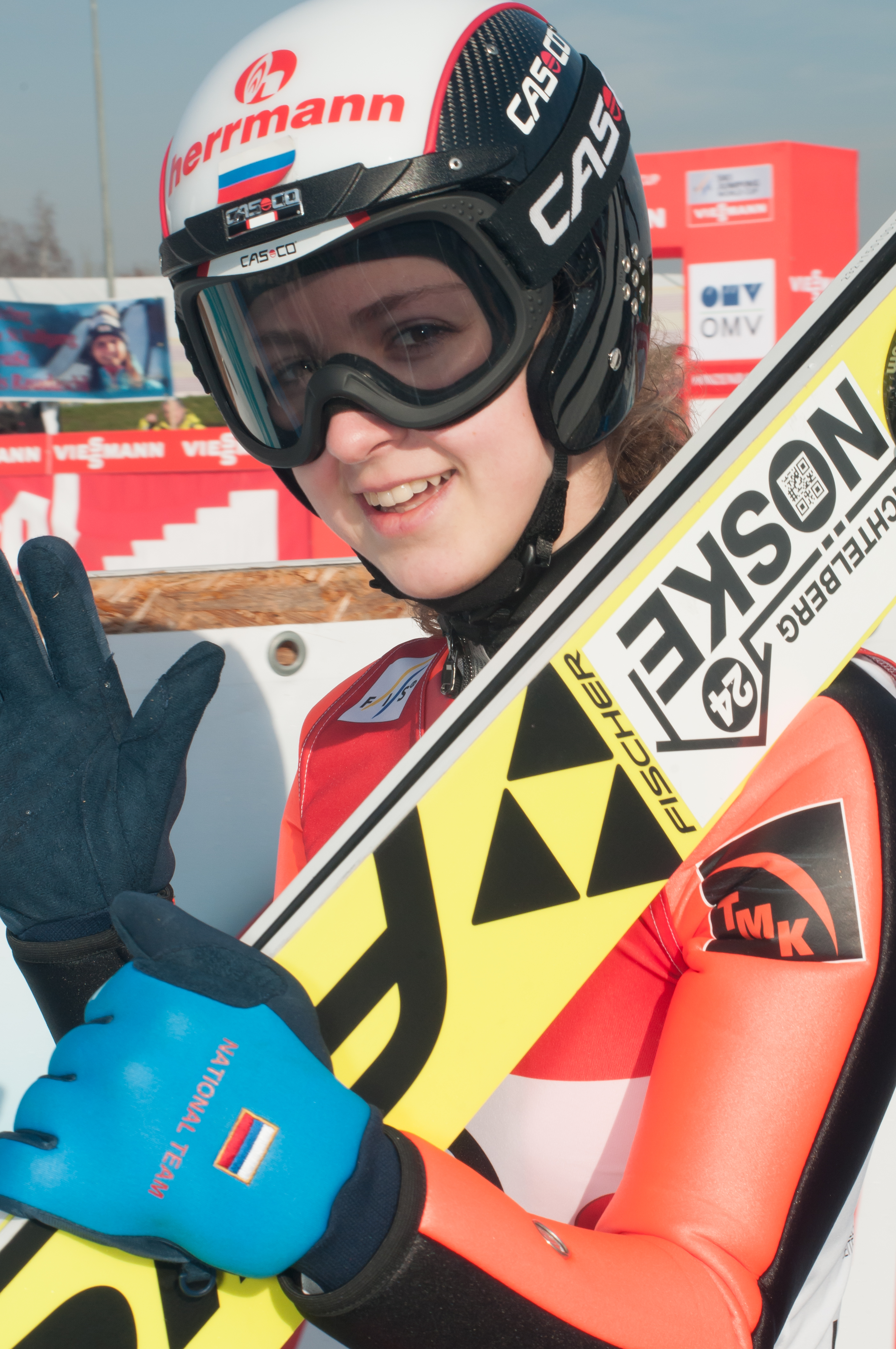
- Kablukova in Hinzenbach, 2015

Personal information
- Nationality: Russia
- Born: 16 June 1998 (age 28)

Sport
- Sport: Skiing
- Club: Sdushor Start

World Cup career
- Seasons: 2016–present
- Indiv. starts: 28
Medal record
Women's ski jumping
Junior World Championships
Silver medal – second place	Kandersteg 2018	Team NH
- Updated on 15 February 2018

Ksenia Kablukova (born 16 June 1998) is a Russian ski jumper. She has competed at World Cup level since the 2015/16 season, with her best individual result being 14th place in Pyeongchang on 15 February 2017. At the 2018 Junior World Championships in Kandersteg, she won a team silver medal.
