= Anniken Mork =

Norwegian ski jumper (born 1991)

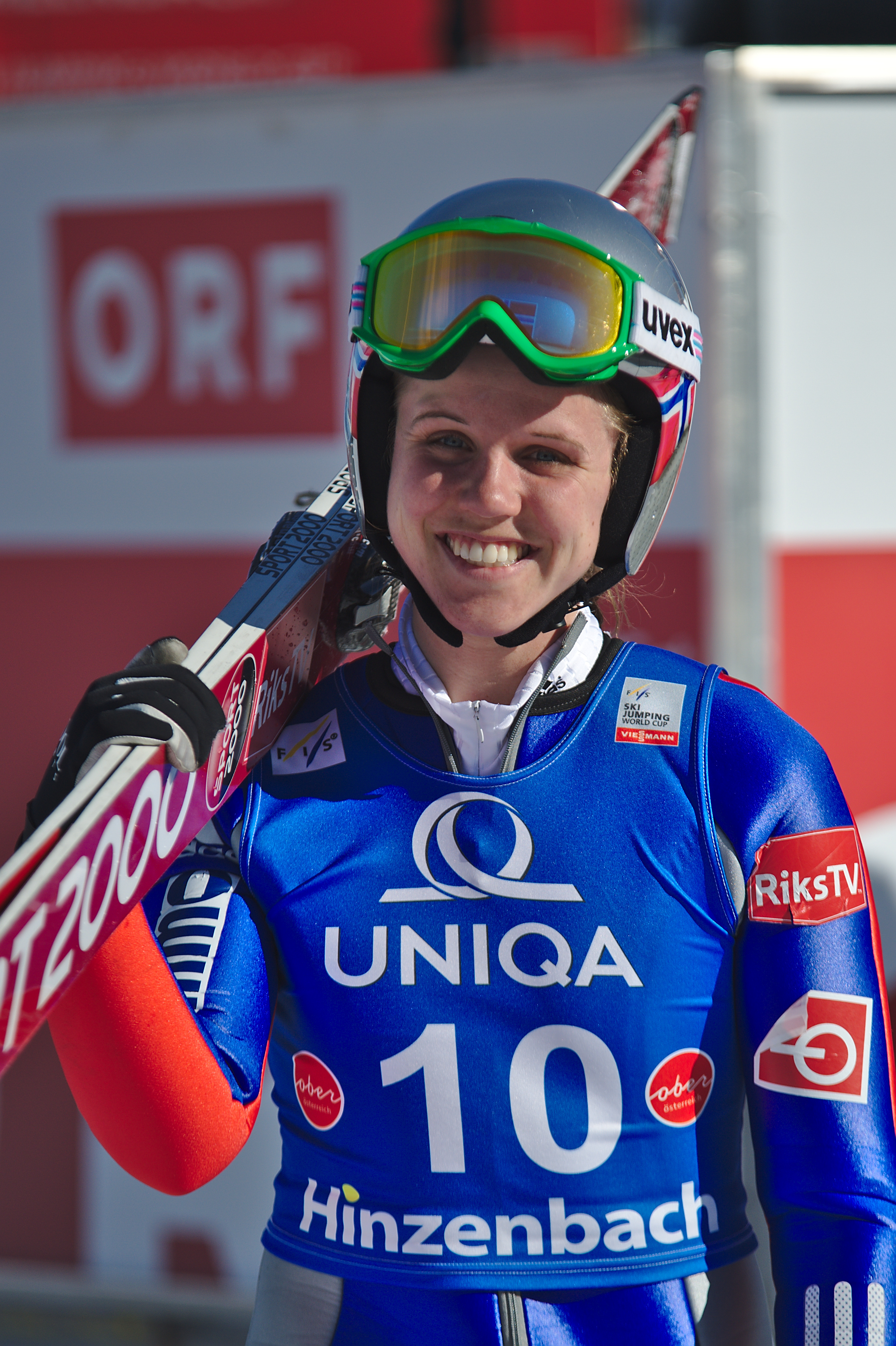

Personal information
- Nationality: Norway
- Born: 16 January 1991 (age 35) Oslo, Norway

Sport
- Sport: Skiing
- Club: Ready

Anniken Mork (born 16 January 1991) is a Norwegian ski jumper, who represents the club Ready.

She competed at the FIS Nordic World Ski Championships 2017 in Lahti, Finland.
