= Manuela Malsiner =

Italian ski jumper (born 1997)

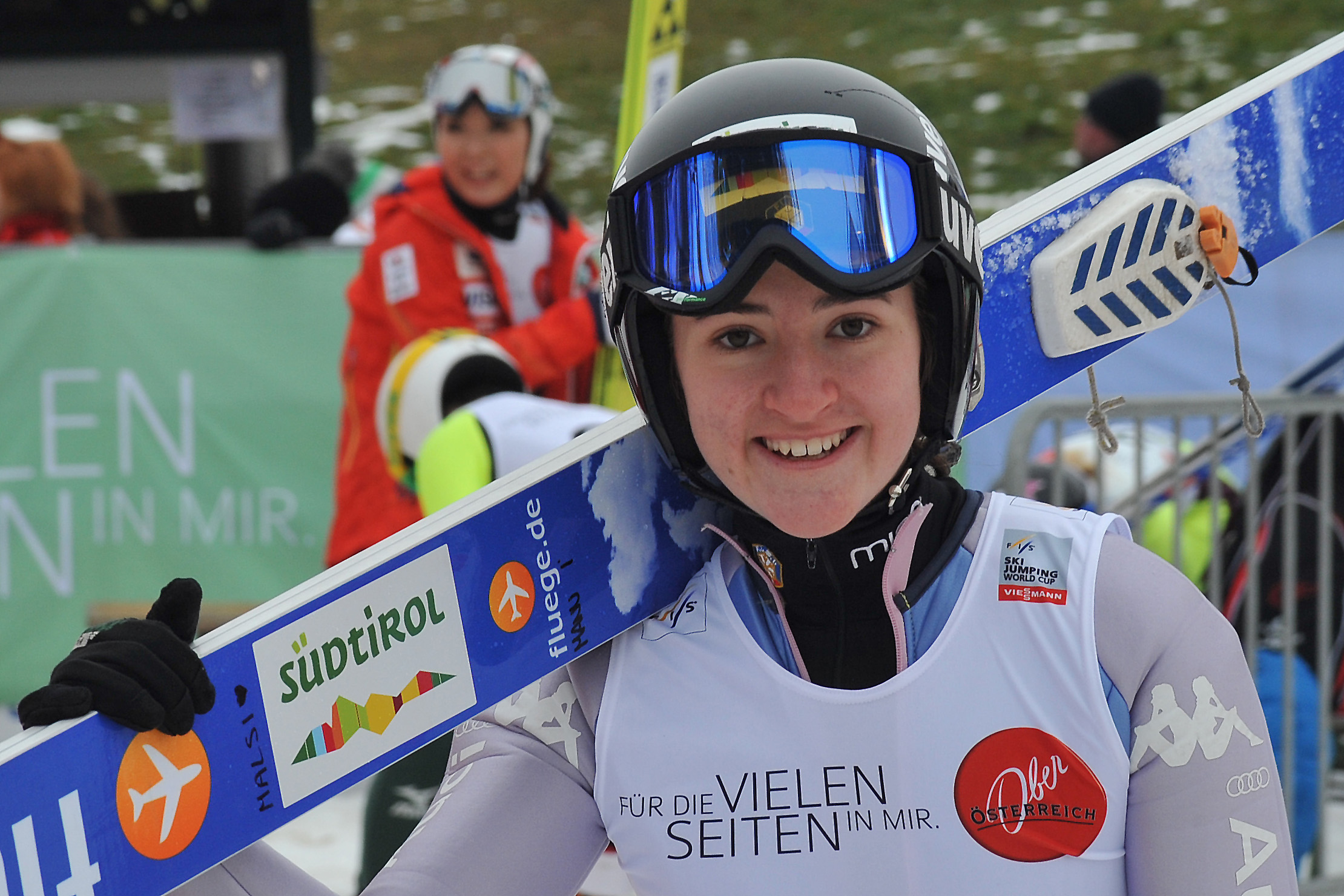
- Malsiner in Hinzenbach, 2014

Personal information
- Nationality: Italy
- Born: 15 December 1997 (age 28) Sterzing, South Tyrol, Italy
- Height: 160 cm (5 ft 3 in)

Sport
- Sport: Skiing
- Club: Gardena-Raiffeisen

World Cup career
- Seasons: 2013–present
- Indiv. starts: 50
- Indiv. podiums: 1
- Team starts: 1
Medal record
Women's ski jumping
Junior World Championships
Gold medal – first place	Park City 2017	Individual NH
- Updated on 3 February 2018

Manuela Malsiner (born 15 December 1997) is an Italian ski jumper. She has competed at World Cup level since the 2012/13 season, with her best individual result being second place in Zaō on 20 January 2017. At the 2017 Junior World Championships in Park City, she won an individual gold medal in the normal hill competition.

Her younger sisters Lara and Jessica are also ski jumpers.
