= Ski jumping at the 2018 Winter Olympics – Women's normal hill individual =

Women's normal hill individual at the XXIII Olympic Winter Games
- Venue: Alpensia Ski Jumping Stadium
- Dates: 12 February 2018
- Competitors: 35 from 14 nations
- Winning score: 264.6

Medalists
1st place, gold medalist(s)		Maren Lundby	Norway
2nd place, silver medalist(s)		Katharina Althaus	Germany
3rd place, bronze medalist(s)		Sara Takanashi	Japan

The women's normal hill individual ski jumping competition for the 2018 Winter Olympics in Pyeongchang, South Korea, was held on 12 February 2018 at the Alpensia Ski Jumping Stadium.

== Summary ==
The defending champion was Carina Vogt, the field also included the 2014 silver medalist Daniela Iraschko-Stolz. None of them returned to the podium. Maren Lundby, who showed the best results in both jumps, became the champion. Katharina Althaus won the silver medal, and Sara Takanashi became third. For all of them this was the first Olympic medal.

In the victory ceremony, the medals were presented by Octavian Morariu, member of the International Olympic Committee accompanied by Erik Røste, Norwegian Ski Federation president.

== Results ==
The final was started at 21:50.

Rank	Bib	Name	Country	Round 1			Final round			Total
Rank	Bib	Name	Country	Distance (m)	Points	Rank	Distance (m)	Points	Rank	Points
1st place, gold medalist(s)	35	Maren Lundby	Norway	105.5	125.4	1	110.0	139.2	1	264.6
2nd place, silver medalist(s)	34	Katharina Althaus	Germany	106.5	123.2	2	106.0	129.4	2	252.6
3rd place, bronze medalist(s)	33	Sara Takanashi	Japan	103.5	120.3	3	103.5	123.5	3	243.8
4	31	Irina Avvakumova	Olympic Athletes from Russia	99.0	114.7	4	102.0	116.0	5	230.7
5	30	Carina Vogt	Germany	97.0	108.6	6	101.5	119.3	4	227.9
6	19	Daniela Iraschko-Stolz	Austria	101.5	113.3	5	99.0	112.6	7	225.9
7	26	Nika Križnar	Slovenia	101.0	108.5	7	104.0	114.7	6	223.2
8	22	Ramona Straub	Germany	98.5	104.4	10	98.5	106.1	8	210.5
9	32	Yuki Ito	Japan	94.0	105.1	9	93.0	98.8	10	203.9
10	25	Juliane Seyfarth	Germany	102.5	108.3	8	90.0	86.0	17	194.3
11	29	Chiara Hölzl	Austria	88.0	92.2	14	95.5	101.0	9	193.2
12	23	Kaori Iwabuchi	Japan	93.5	98.2	11	89.0	90.1	13	188.3
13	21	Jacqueline Seifriedsberger	Austria	93.0	93.7	13	92.0	89.8	14	183.5
14	27	Ema Klinec	Slovenia	91.5	94.2	12	89.0	87.4	16	181.6
15	17	Lara Malsiner	Italy	88.5	90.2	16	92.5	89.3	15	179.5
16	15	Silje Opseth	Norway	89.5	83.5	18	91.5	94.7	11	178.2
17	24	Yūka Setō	Japan	93.0	90.3	15	89.0	81.7	24	172.0
18	20	Manuela Malsiner	Italy	86.5	79.6	20	89.0	83.8	22	163.4
19	3	Sarah Hendrickson	United States	86.0	76.7	23	88.0	83.9	21	160.6
20	16	Chang Xinyue	China	83.0	69.6	26	84.5	85.3	18	154.9
21	9	Lucile Morat	France	86.5	79.7	19	86.5	75.1	27	154.8
22	18	Špela Rogelj	Slovenia	80.0	64.3	28	90.5	90.2	12	154.5
23	11	Julia Kykkänen	Finland	85.0	77.2	22	84.0	75.4	26	152.6
24	7	Alexandra Kustova	Olympic Athletes from Russia	85.0	77.3	21	85.5	75.0	28	152.3
25	14	Sofia Tikhonova	Olympic Athletes from Russia	86.5	75.0	24	86.0	75.8	25	150.8
25	12	Daniela Haralambie	Romania	80.5	66.5	27	85.0	84.3	20	150.8
27	10	Anastasiya Barannikova	Olympic Athletes from Russia	88.0	83.7	17	82.0	65.3	29	149.0
28	13	Léa Lemare	France	74.5	62.3	29	93.5	84.5	19	146.8
29	6	Abby Ringquist	United States	77.5	62.0	30	91.0	82.4	23	144.4
30	28	Urša Bogataj	Slovenia	84.5	71.2	25	81.0	64.0	30	135.2
31	4	Nita Englund	United States	77.0	57.9	31	did not advance			
32	5	Taylor Henrich	Canada	78.0	56.5	32	did not advance			
33	8	Elena Runggaldier	Italy	71.5	48.8	33	did not advance			
34	1	Evelyn Insam	Italy	72.0	46.4	34	did not advance			
35	2	Park Guy-lim	South Korea	56.0	14.2	35	did not advance			
