= FIS Nordic World Ski Championships 2015 – Women's individual normal hill =

Women's individual normal hill at the FIS Nordic World Ski Championships 2015
- Date: 20 February 2015
- Competitors: 40 from 13 nations
- Winning points: 236.9

Medalists
gold medal	Carina Vogt	Germany
silver medal	Yuki Ito	Japan
bronze medal	Daniela Iraschko-Stolz	Austria

The Women's individual normal hill event of the FIS Nordic World Ski Championships 2015 was held on 20 February 2015. A qualification was held on 19 February.

== Results ==
=== Qualifying ===
The Qualifying was held at 17:00.

Rank	Bib	Name	Country	Distance (m)	Points	Notes
1	28	Taylor Henrich	Canada	92.0	114.2	Q
2	24	Julia Clair	France	88.5	108.5	Q
3	31	Maren Lundby	Norway	89.0	108.2	Q
4	30	Juliane Seyfarth	Germany	89.0	106.8	Q
5	29	Chiara Hölzl	Austria	88.0	103.9	Q
6	22	Ulrike Gräßler	Germany	88.5	103.4	Q
7	32	Katharina Althaus	Germany	87.0	102.6	Q
8	27	Jessica Jerome	United States	87.5	101.7	Q
9	34	Irina Avvakumova	Russia	87.5	100.4	Q
10	33	Line Jahr	Norway	85.0	98.5	Q
11	19	Katja Požun	Slovenia	83.5	96.7	Q
12	16	Tara Geraghy-Moats	United States	84.5	95.2	Q
13	23	Coline Mattel	France	83.5	94.3	Q
14	21	Yuka Seto	Japan	86.5	94.1	Q
15	12	Elena Runggaldier	Italy	85.0	93.8	Q
16	13	Evelyn Insam	Italy	83.5	93.4	Q
17	14	Gyda Enger	Norway	82.5	93.2	Q
18	26	Sofya Tikhonova	Russia	83.5	91.7	Q
19	20	Kaori Iwabuchi	Japan	80.0	91.2	Q
20	25	Eva Logar	Slovenia	82.5	89.3	Q
21	15	Abby Hughes	United States	81.5	88.3	Q
22	18	Julia Kykkänen	Finland	80.0	87.2	Q
23	10	Michaela Doleželová	Czech Republic	80.0	86.8	Q
24	6	Anna Odine Strøm	Norway	81.5	86.7	Q
25	17	Lea Lemare	France	80.0	84.8	Q
26	8	Barbora Blažková	Czech Republic	78.5	79.0	Q
27	11	Anastasiya Gladysheva	Russia	79.0	77.9	Q
28	2	Li Xueyao	China	78.0	75.9	Q
29	9	Chang Xinyue	China	74.0	67.5	Q
30	5	Susanna Forsström	Finland	73.5	65.5	Q
31	3	Zdena Pešatová	Czech Republic	70.5	61.8	
32	4	Liu Qi	China	70.0	60.3	
33	7	Ma Tong	China	60.0	38.6	
34	1	Virág Vörös	Hungary	57.0	30.6	
Prequalified
	35	Sarah Hendrickson	United States	87.0		Q
	36	Nita Englund	United States	85.5		Q
	37	Jacqueline Seifriedsberger	Austria	87.5		Q
	38	Maja Vtič	Slovenia	85.5		Q
	39	Eva Pinkelnig	Austria	84.5		Q
	40	Yuki Ito	Japan	89.5		Q
	41	Špela Rogelj	Slovenia	80.0		Q
	42	Carina Vogt	Germany	87.0		Q
	43	Sara Takanashi	Japan	87.0		Q
	44	Daniela Iraschko-Stolz	Austria	87.5		Q

=== Final ===
Round 1 was started at 17:00 and the final round at 17:58.

Rank	Bib	Name	Country	Round 1 Distance (m)	Round 1 Points	Round 1 Rank	Final Round Distance (m)	Final Round Points	Final Round Rank	Total Points
1st place, gold medalist(s)	38	Carina Vogt	Germany	91.5	119.2	2	92.0	117.7	2	236.9
2nd place, silver medalist(s)	36	Yuki Ito	Japan	89.0	113.9	4	93.0	121.1	1	235.1
3rd place, bronze medalist(s)	40	Daniela Iraschko-Stolz	Austria	92.5	122.9	1	89.0	110.9	8	233.8
4	39	Sara Takanashi	Japan	90.0	111.4	8	93.0	116.9	3	228.3
5	24	Taylor Henrich	Canada	90.5	115.5	3	91.0	112.4	7	227.9
6	31	Sarah Hendrickson	United States	87.0	111.1	9	91.0	114.8	4	226.4
7	33	Jacqueline Seifriedsberger	Austria	89.0	112.9	6	90.5	112.7	6	225.6
8	35	Eva Pinkelnig	Austria	89.0	113.6	5	89.5	110.2	9	223.8
9	23	Jessica Jerome	United States	86.5	105.3	15	90.5	114.1	5	219.4
10	37	Špela Rogelj	Slovenia	87.0	111.9	7	88.5	106.0	17	217.9
11	30	Irina Avvakumova	Russia	87.5	108.4	11	88.5	107.4	14	215.8
12	32	Nita Englund	United States	86.5	105.8	14	88.5	109.7	10	214.5
13	34	Maja Vtič	Slovenia	87.5	107.6	12	88.5	106.1	16	213.7
14	26	Juliane Seyfarth	Germany	85.0	103.9	18	90.0	108.6	11	212.5
15	27	Maren Lundby	Norway	86.0	104.1	17	88.0	107.5	13	211.6
16	25	Chiara Hölzl	Austria	88.5	106.7	13	87.5	104.6	18	211.3
17	28	Katharina Althaus	Germany	85.0	102.0	20	88.0	108.2	12	210.2
18	12	Tara Geraghty-Moats	United States	85.0	101.5	22	87.5	107.3	15	208.8
19	29	Line Jahr	Norway	84.5	102.3	19	87.0	104.5	19	206.8
20	22	Sofya Tikhonova	Russia	86.5	105.0	16	85.5	101.0	21	206.0
21	20	Julia Clair	France	89.0	108.6	10	83.5	96.7	24	205.3
22	18	Ulrike Gräßler	Germany	84.5	99.2	23	85.5	104.5	19	203.7
23	14	Julia Kykkänen	Finland	85.0	101.7	21	81.5	92.7	29	194.4
24	15	Katja Požun	Slovenia	83.0	97.0	24	82.0	95.3	27	192.3
25	3	Anna Odine Strøm	Norway	81.5	95.7	25	83.5	96.3	26	192.0
26	21	Eva Logar	Slovenia	82.0	93.5	28	84.0	98.4	22	191.9
27	19	Coline Mattel	France	81.0	93.5	28	82.5	97.4	23	190.9
28	10	Gyda Enger	Norway	84.0	95.3	26	83.0	94.3	28	189.6
29	6	Michaela Doleželová	Czech Republic	83.0	91.2	30	83.0	96.5	25	187.7
30	8	Elena Runggaldier	Italy	83.5	94.6	27	80.5	90.2	30	184.8
31	17	Yuka Seto	Japan	80.0	90.3	31				90.3
32	13	Lea Lemare	France	80.0	89.6	32				89.6
33	9	Evelyn Insam	Italy	80.0	87.0	33				87.0
34	11	Abby Hughes	United States	79.0	85.1	34				85.1
35	7	Anastasiya Gladysheva	Russia	78.5	84.8	35				84.8
36	16	Kaori Iwabuchi	Japan	77.0	82.0	36				82.0
37	1	Li Xueyao	China	75.5	78.2	37				78.2
38	5	Chang Xinyue	China	75.0	74.9	38				74.9
39	4	Barbora Blažková	Czech Republic	75.5	73.5	39				73.5
40	2	Susanna Forsström	Finland	71.5	67.5	40				67.5
