= FIS Nordic World Ski Championships 2017 – Women's individual normal hill =

Women's individual normal hill at the FIS Nordic World Ski Championships 2017
- Venue: Salpausselkä
- Location: Lahti, Finland
- Date: 24 February
- Competitors: 40 from 14 nations
- Winning points: 254.6

Medalists
gold medal	Carina Vogt	Germany
silver medal	Yuki Ito	Japan
bronze medal	Sara Takanashi	Japan

The Women's individual normal hill event of the FIS Nordic World Ski Championships 2017 was held on 24 February 2017.

== Results ==
=== Qualification ===
The qualification was held on 23 February 2017.

Rank	Bib	Name	Country	Distance (m)	Points	Notes
1	37	Chiara Hölzl	Austria	96.5	123.6	Q
2	27	Elena Runggaldier	Italy	91.5	114.4	Q
3	35	Manuela Malsiner	Italy	98.5	114.0	Q
4	28	Léa Lemare	France	92.5	113.7	Q
5	33	Špela Rogelj	Slovenia	92.0	112.0	Q
6	36	Sarah Hendrickson	United States	91.0	111.3	Q
7	32	Kaori Iwabuchi	Japan	93.5	110.9	Q
8	24	Evelyn Insam	Italy	89.5	108.9	Q
9	21	Nika Križnar	Slovenia	92.0	108.0	Q
10	22	Taylor Henrich	Canada	90.5	107.1	Q
11	38	Yuka Seto	Japan	88.5	105.6	Q
12	29	Lucile Morat	France	89.0	104.5	Q
13	31	Ramona Straub	Germany	93.5	104.0	Q
14	23	Gianina Ernst	Germany	87.5	103.8	Q
15	25	Sofya Tikhonova	Russia	86.5	102.8	Q
16	16	Lara Malsiner	Italy	87.5	102.5	Q
17	26	Anastasiya Barannikova	Russia	88.5	102.3	Q
18	20	Ksenia Kablukova	Russia	86.0	101.9	Q
19	12	Chang Xinyue	China	86.5	99.9	Q
20	30	Julia Kykkänen	Finland	85.0	99.7	Q
21	39	Maja Vtič	Slovenia	83.0	97.3	Q
22	19	Dana Haralambie	Romania	85.5	96.9	Q
23	6	Silje Opseth	Norway	83.0	93.1	Q
24	17	Anniken Mork	Norway	84.5	89.6	Q
24	15	Nicole Maurer	Canada	80.0	89.6	Q
26	13	Li Xueyao	China	82.5	89.3	Q
27	34	Nita Englund	United States	78.5	85.2	Q
28	14	Barbora Blažková	Czech Republic	77.0	78.3	Q
28	1	Marta Křepelková	Czech Republic	76.0	78.3	Q
30	18	Natasha Bodnarchuk	Canada	74.5	77.5	Q
31	3	Liu Qi	China	75.5	76.0	
32	4	Susanna Forsström	Finland	75.5	73.2	
33	9	Ma Tong	China	72.5	69.3	
34	2	Jenny Rautionaho	Finland	70.0	68.1	
35	10	Jana Mrákotová	Czech Republic	71.0	67.4	
36	7	Andreea Trâmbițaș	Romania	69.0	60 .4	
37	5	Valentina Sderzhikova	Kazakhstan	65.5	50.2	
38	11	Dayana Akhmetvaliyeva	Kazakhstan	56.5	30.8	
—	8	Šarlote Šķēle	Latvia	DSQ		
Prequalified
	40	Svenja Würth	Germany	93.0		Q
	41	Jacqueline Seifriedsberger	Austria	93.0		Q
	42	Irina Avvakumova	Russia	80.5		Q
	43	Ema Klinec	Slovenia	87.0		Q
	44	Carina Vogt	Germany	93.0		Q
	45	Daniela Iraschko-Stolz	Austria	89.0		Q
	46	Katharina Althaus	Germany	91.5		Q
	47	Maren Lundby	Norway	88.5		Q
	48	Yuki Ito	Japan	92.0		Q
	49	Sara Takanashi	Japan	92.5		Q

=== Final ===
The final was held on 24 February 2017.

Rank	Bib	Name	Country	Round 1 Distance (m)	Round 1 Points	Round 1 Rank	Final Round Distance (m)	Final Round Points	Final Round Rank	Total Points
1st place, gold medalist(s)	35	Carina Vogt	Germany	98.5	127.9	3	96.5	126.7	1	254.6
2nd place, silver medalist(s)	39	Yuki Ito	Japan	97.0	127.0	4	96.5	125.6	2	252.6
3rd place, bronze medalist(s)	40	Sara Takanashi	Japan	98.0	128.5	2	95.0	122.6	4	251.1
4	38	Maren Lundby	Norway	99.5	131.2	1	91.0	116.5	8	247.7
5	34	Ema Klinec	Slovenia	99.0	122.7	5	94.0	123.1	3	245.8
6	31	Svenja Würth	Germany	97.0	122.1	6	94.0	119.6	7	241.7
7	32	Jacqueline Seifriedsberger	Austria	94.0	121.0	7	92.5	119.9	6	240.9
8	37	Katharina Althaus	Germany	94.0	117.1	9	93.5	121.9	5	239.0
9	36	Daniela Iraschko-Stolz	Austria	93.0	117.6	8	89.5	112.0	10	229.6
10	28	Chiara Hölzl	Austria	93.5	116.0	11	91.0	113.0	9	229.0
11	23	Kaori Iwabuchi	Japan	92.0	113.8	12	89.5	107.7	13	221.5
12	33	Irina Avvakumova	Russia	90.0	111.1	13	90.5	110.3	11	221.4
13	12	Nika Križnar	Slovenia	90.5	109.4	15	91.5	110.0	12	219.4
14	29	Yuka Seto	Japan	88.0	108.2	18	87.5	105.5	14	213.7
15	26	Manuela Malsiner	Italy	91.0	108.4	17	86.5	104.5	16	212.9
16	13	Taylor Henrich	Canada	88.0	108.9	16	85.0	101.1	19	210.0
17	30	Maja Vtič	Slovenia	89.5	107.1	19	86.0	101.4	18	208.5
18	18	Elena Runggaldier	Italy	92.0	116.8	10	81.0	91.6	26	208.4
19	21	Julia Kykkänen	Finland	86.5	106.3	20	82.5	97.7	20	204.0
20	19	Léa Lemare	France	90.0	109.9	14	83.0	93.9	22	203.8
21	17	Anastasiya Barannikova	Russia	84.5	96.9	25	86.5	104.9	15	201.8
22	24	Špela Rogelj	Slovenia	84.0	97.7	23	87.5	102.7	17	200.4
23	27	Sarah Hendrickson	United States	86.5	104.3	21	82.0	93.7	23	198.0
24	20	Lucile Morat	France	85.5	102.2	22	83.5	95.1	21	197.3
25	14	Gianina Ernst	Germany	84.5	96.6	26	81.5	92.2	25	188.8
26	16	Sofya Tikhonova	Russia	84.0	97.4	24	82.0	90.7	27	188.1
27	25	Nita Englund	United States	83.5	94.7	30	82.0	93.2	24	187.9
28	4	Li Xueyao	China	84.0	94.7	30	81.5	89.9	28	184.6
29	10	Daniela Haralambie	Romania	83.5	95.9	27	79.5	86.6	29	182.5
30	11	Ksenia Kablukova	Russia	83.5	95.8	28	78.0	85.1	30	180.9
31	2	Silje Opseth	Norway	83.0	94.8	29	79.0	82.8	31	177.6
32	5	Barbora Blažková	Czech Republic	84.0	93.9	32	DNQ			93.9
33	22	Ramona Straub	Germany	84.0	93.7	33	DNQ			93.7
33	15	Evelyn Insam	Italy	83.0	93.7	33	DNQ			93.7
35	3	Chang Xinyue	China	84.0	93.6	35	DNQ			93.6
36	8	Anniken Mork	Norway	82.0	91.6	36	DNQ			91.6
37	7	Lara Malsiner	Italy	83.0	91.3	37	DNQ			91.3
38	1	Marta Křepelková	Czech Republic	77.0	82.4	38	DNQ			82.4
39	6	Nicole Maurer	Canada	77.0	80.1	39	DNQ			80.1
40	9	Natasha Bodnarchuk	Canada	74.5	78.1	40	DNQ			78.1
