= FIS Nordic World Ski Championships 2017 – Mixed team normal hill =

Mixed team normal hill at the FIS Nordic World Ski Championships 2017
- Venue: Salpausselkä
- Location: Lahti, Finland
- Date: 26 February

The Mixed team normal hill event of the FIS Nordic World Ski Championships 2017 was held on 26 February 2017.

== Results ==
The first round was started at 17:30 and the second round at 19:18.

Rank	Bib	Country	Round 1 Distance (m)	Round 1 Points	Round 1 Rank	Final Round Distance (m)	Final Round Points	Final Round Rank	Total Points
1st place, gold medalist(s)	14	Germany; Carina Vogt; Markus Eisenbichler; Svenja Würth; Andreas Wellinger	98.0; 95.5; 95.0; 99.0	508.6; 129.2; 126.9; 120.0; 132.5	1	95.0; 99.5; 95.5; 98.0	526.9; 126.0; 137.1; 120.1; 143.7	1	1035.5; 255.2; 264.0; 240.1; 276.2
2nd place, silver medalist(s)	13	Austria; Daniela Iraschko-Stolz; Michael Hayböck; Jacqueline Seifriedsberger; Stefan Kraft	88.5; 92.0; 94.5; 96.5	490.7; 113.3; 117.6; 125.6; 134.2	2	90.5; 97.5; 92.5; 97.0	508.6; 116.7; 131.7; 121.4; 138.8	2	999.3; 230.0; 249.3; 247.0; 273.0
3rd place, bronze medalist(s)	11	Japan; Sara Takanashi; Taku Takeuchi; Yuki Ito; Daiki Ito	90.0; 89.0; 95.0; 92.5	482.2; 119.3; 116.3; 125.4; 121.2	3	89.5; 92.0; 93.5; 96.5	497.5; 118.3; 120.8; 125.0; 133.4	4	979.7; 237.6; 237.1; 250.4; 254.6
4	12	Slovenia; Nika Križnar; Anže Lanišek; Ema Klinec; Peter Prevc	84.0; 93.5; 92.5; 88.0	460.3; 106.1; 123.9; 118.6; 111.7	4	90.5; 96.5; 91.5; 97.5	501.1; 116.1; 128.7; 120.2; 136.1	3	961.4; 222.2; 252.6; 238.8; 247.8
5	10	Norway; Silje Opseth; Daniel-André Tande; Maren Lundby; Andreas Stjernen	80.5; 91.0; 90.5; 91.5	442.8; 95.4; 114.0; 116.6; 116.8	5	67.5; 95.0; 93.5; 91.0	435.0; 63.7; 125.5; 120.9; 124.9	6	877.8; 159.1; 239.5; 237.5; 241.7
6	9	Russia; Anastasiya Barannikova; Denis Kornilov; Irina Avvakumova; Evgeniy Klimov	85.5; 89.5; 85.5; 85.55	422.0; 100.8; 111.4; 101.9; 107.9	7	87.0; 92.5; 85.0; 88.0	442.0; 105.0; 117.3; 101.7; 118.0	5	864.0; 205.8; 228.7; 203.6; 225.9
7	5	Italy; Elena Runggaldier; Sebastian Colloredo; Manuela Malsiner; Davide Bresadola	87.0; 89.0; 88.5; 85.5	432.2; 102.6; 111.0; 107.4; 111.2	6	80.5; 83.0; 87.0; 88.0	415.9; 93.5; 103.6; 102.8; 116.0	7	848.1; 196.1; 214.6; 210.2; 227.2
8	7	United States; Nita Englund; Michael Glasder; Sarah Hendrickson; Kevin Bickner	79.5; 80.5; 85.0; 88.5	403.8; 92.6; 96.2; 105.3; 109.7	8	75.5; 83.0; 84.0; 89.0	398.4; 83.0; 100.7; 101.1; 113.6	8	802.2; 175.6; 196.9; 206.4; 223.3
9	6	Czech Republic; Marta Křepelková; Jakub Janda; Barbora Blažková; Roman Koudelka	76.0; 88.0; 77.0; 94.0	403.3; 81.3; 110.7; 88.3; 123.0	9	DNQ			
10	8	France; Léa Lemare; Paul Brasme; Lucile Morat; Vincent Descombes Sevoie	84.5; 82.0; 84.0; 84.0	403.1; 103.3; 97.3; 100.7; 101.8	10	DNQ			
11	4	Finland; Susanna Forsström; Ville Larinto; Julia Kykkänen; Janne Ahonen	79.0; 88.5; 78.5; 90.5	397.4; 80.6; 112.6; 87.7; 116.5	11	DNQ			
12	3	Canada; Natasha Bodnarchuk; Joshua Maurer; Taylor Henrich; Mackenzie Boyd-Clowes	76.0; 80.0; 85.5; 88.0	379.5; 80.4; 90.3; 102.2; 106.6	12	DNQ			
13	2	Romania; Andreea Trâmbițaș; Sorin Iulian Pîtea; Daniela Haralambie; Nicolae Mitrofan	67.0; 82.0; 80.0; 76.5	336.2; 61.4; 98.8; 92.6; 83.4	13	DNQ			
14	1	Kazakhstan; Dayana Akhmetvaliyeva; Ilya Kratov; Valentina Sderzhikova; Alexey Korolev	53.5; 82.0; 62.0; 77.0	258.4; 30.9; 94.5; 51.4; 81.6	14	DNQ			
