= FIS Nordic World Ski Championships 2021 – Women's team normal hill =

Women's team normal hill at the FIS Nordic World Ski Championships 2021
- Location: Oberstdorf, Germany
- Dates: 26 February
- Competitors: 48 from 12 nations
- Teams: 12
- Winning points: 959.3

Medalists
gold medal	Daniela Iraschko-Stolz; Sophie Sorschag; Chiara Hölzl; Marita Kramer	Austria
silver medal	Nika Križnar; Špela Rogelj; Urša Bogataj; Ema Klinec	Slovenia
bronze medal	Silje Opseth; Anna Odine Strøm; Thea Minyan Bjørseth; Maren Lundby	Norway

The Women's team normal hill competition at the FIS Nordic World Ski Championships 2021 was held on 26 February 2021.

== Results ==
The first round was started at 17:15 and the final round at 18:20.

Rank	Bib	Country	Round 1			Final round			Total
Rank	Bib	Country	Distance (m)	Points	Rank	Distance (m)	Points	Rank	Points
1st place, gold medalist(s)	10	Austria; Daniela Iraschko-Stolz; Sophie Sorschag; Chiara Hölzl; Marita Kramer	97.0; 88.0; 89.5; 102.5	452.7; 120.5; 96.7; 105.3; 130.2	1	99.5; 93.5; 96.5; 104.0	506.6; 129.3; 117.1; 120.6; 139.6	1	959.3
2nd place, silver medalist(s)	12	Slovenia; Nika Križnar; Špela Rogelj; Urša Bogataj; Ema Klinec	98.0; 93.5; 91.5; 91.0	451.3; 126.4; 110.8; 105.1; 109.0	2	106.0; 96.5; 97.0; 95.5	506.6; 135.1; 125.6; 119.7; 126.2	1	957.9
3rd place, bronze medalist(s)	11	Norway; Silje Opseth; Anna Odine Strøm; Thea Minyan Bjørseth; Maren Lundby	98.0; 87.0; 93.0; 95.5	448.3; 119.4; 94.5; 112.6; 121.8	3	99.0; 91.0; 98.5; 97.5	493.8; 126.1; 110.8; 125.3; 131.6	3	942.1
4	9	Japan; Yūki Itō; Yūka Setō; Nozomi Maruyama; Sara Takanashi	93.5; 86.5; 87.0; 94.5	421.8; 111.7; 93.1; 100.0; 117.0	4	93.0; 87.5; 88.0; 98.0	455.7; 118.6; 103.0; 100.8; 133.3	5	877.5
5	8	Germany; Anna Rupprecht; Juliane Seyfarth; Luisa Görlich; Katharina Althaus	90.0; 88.5; 85.0; 94.0	413.2; 107.0; 97.4; 93.5; 115.3	5	94.0; 90.5; 94.5; 94.5	459.9; 113.9; 110.2; 112.6; 123.2	4	873.1
6	7	Russian Ski Federation; Kristina Prokopieva; Sofia Tikhonova; Irma Makhina; Irina Avvakumova	79.0; 88.0; 86.5; 91.0	372.8; 80.1; 94.7; 93.1; 104.9	6	86.0; 87.0; 87.0; 95.5	414.6; 89.1; 100.6; 100.4; 124.5	6	787.4
7	6	Poland; Anna Twardosz; Kinga Rajda; Joanna Szwab; Kamila Karpiel	87.5; 77.0; 64.5; 81.5	297.6; 98.5; 71.5; 43.5; 84.1	8	83.0; 78.0; 71.0; 82.0	333.6; 92.6; 80.4; 66.7; 93.9	7	631.2
8	5	Czech Republic; Štěpánka Ptáčková; Veronika Jenčová; Klára Ulrichová; Karolína Indráčková	69.5; 76.5; 86.5; 80.5	298.5; 58.0; 65.0; 93.4; 82.1	7	69.0; 77.0; 83.0; 80.0	323.0; 66.2; 74.4; 90.8; 91.6	8	621.5
9	4	Finland; Susanna Forsström; Jenny Rautionaho; Julia Tervahartiala; Julia Kykkänen	67.5; 86.5; 71.5; 81.0	282.0; 53.9; 90.1; 57.5; 80.5	9	Did not qualify			
10	1	United States; Annika Belshaw; Logan Sankey; Anna Hoffmann; Paige Jones	77.0; 71.0; 73.0; 68.5	254.3; 73.5; 59.3; 64.5; 57.0	10	Did not qualify			
11	2	Canada; Natalie Eilers; Natasha Bodnarchuk; Alexandria Loutitt; Abigail Strate	67.5; 70.5; 73.0; 76.0	246.7; 49.7; 55.7; 67.7; 73.6	11	Did not qualify			
12	3	Romania; Andreea Trâmbițaș; Alessia Mitu Coşca; Delia Anamaria Folea; Daniela Haralambie	65.0; 61.0; 65.0; 81.5	209.8; 47.8; 33.9; 44.8; 83.3	12	Did not qualify			
