= FIS Nordic World Ski Championships 2021 – Women's individual large hill =

Women's individual large hill at the FIS Nordic World Ski Championships 2021
- Location: Oberstdorf, Germany
- Dates: 2 March (qualification); 3 March
- Competitors: 51 from 16 nations
- Winning points: 296.6

Medalists
gold medal	Maren Lundby	Norway
silver medal	Sara Takanashi	Japan
bronze medal	Nika Križnar	Slovenia

The Women's individual large hill competition at the FIS Nordic World Ski Championships 2021 was held on 3 March. A qualification was held on 2 March 2021.

== Results ==
=== Qualification ===
The qualification was started on 2 March at 18:00.

Rank	Bib	Name	Country	Distance (m)	Points	Notes
1	48	Marita Kramer	Austria	137.5	153.3	Q
2	47	Ema Klinec	Slovenia	130.0	148.8	Q
3	50	Sara Takanashi	Japan	127.0	146.2	Q
4	43	Katharina Althaus	Germany	128.0	136.9	Q
5	51	Nika Križnar	Slovenia	123.5	135.7	Q
6	45	Maren Lundby	Norway	122.5	134.4	Q
7	42	Urša Bogataj	Slovenia	127.0	129.9	Q
8	34	Thea Minyan Bjørseth	Norway	123.0	128.9	Q
9	40	Chiara Hölzl	Austria	122.5	125.2	Q
10	35	Jerneja Brecl	Slovenia	121.0	123.0	Q
11	44	Irina Avvakumova	Russian Ski Federation	117.5	120.0	Q
12	36	Anna Rupprecht	Germany	120.0	116.3	Q
13	39	Nozomi Maruyama	Japan	118.5	115.5	Q
14	46	Daniela Iraschko-Stolz	Austria	115.5	115.4	Q
15	49	Silje Opseth	Norway	112.0	113.8	Q
16	41	Sophie Sorschag	Austria	118.5	112.7	Q
17	37	Julia Clair	France	118.5	110.1	Q
18	28	Julia Kykkänen	Finland	110.5	106.6	Q
19	30	Luisa Görlich	Germany	110.0	105.9	Q
20	38	Yuki Ito	Japan	114.0	103.9	Q
21	24	Juliane Seyfarth	Germany	108.5	101.2	Q
22	31	Sofia Tikhonova	Russian Ski Federation	109.0	97.5	Q
23	26	Klára Ulrichová	Czech Republic	106.0	97.3	Q
24	32	Joséphine Pagnier	France	103.0	93.8	Q
25	20	Anna Shpyneva	Russian Ski Federation	105.5	91.4	Q
26	9	Abigail Strate	Canada	100.5	84.3	Q
27	21	Anna Twardosz	Poland	97.5	82.7	Q
28	27	Kaori Iwabuchi	Japan	99.0	80.6	Q
29	22	Jenny Rautionaho	Finland	98.0	77.9	Q
30	25	Karolína Indráčková	Czech Republic	98.0	77.0	Q
31	18	Kinga Rajda	Poland	96.5	75.4	Q
32	29	Irma Makhina	Russian Ski Federation	94.5	74.1	Q
33	23	Daniela Haralambie	Romania	95.0	72.9	Q
34	33	Anna Odine Strøm	Norway	92.0	70.3	Q
35	7	Paige Jones	United States	91.0	67.4	Q
36	14	Nicole Konderla	Poland	90.5	64.7	Q
37	12	Susanna Forsström	Finland	88.5	62.5	Q
38	19	Kamila Karpiel	Poland	89.0	61.5	Q
39	11	Alexandria Loutitt	Canada	88.5	61.0	Q
40	16	Natalie Eilers	Canada	89.0	60.0	Q
41	15	Annika Belshaw	United States	86.5	58.9	
42	13	Štěpánka Ptáčková	Czech Republic	87.5	58.2	
43	10	Frida Westman	Sweden	85.0	50.3	
44	2	Anna Hoffmann	United States	82.5	50.1	
45	17	Logan Sankey	United States	82.0	49.7	
46	5	Astrid Norstedt	Sweden	80.5	46.2	
47	1	Veronika Jenčová	Czech Republic	81.5	45.1	
48	4	Virág Vörös	Hungary	79.5	41.3	
49	3	Andreea Trâmbițaș	Romania	76.0	38.6	
50	6	Nicole Maurer	Canada	73.0	29.2	
51	8	Dayana Pekha	Kazakhstan	69.0	21.7	

=== Final ===
The first round was started on 3 March at 17:15 and the final round at 18:07.

Rank	Bib	Name	Country	Round 1			Final round			Total
Rank	Bib	Name	Country	Distance (m)	Points	Rank	Distance (m)	Points	Rank	Points
1st place, gold medalist(s)	34	Maren Lundby	Norway	128.0	139.8	1	130.5	156.8	1	296.6
2nd place, silver medalist(s)	39	Sara Takanashi	Japan	126.0	134.0	4	134.0	153.9	2	287.9
3rd place, bronze medalist(s)	40	Nika Križnar	Slovenia	126.0	136.2	2	129.0	150.9	3	287.1
4	37	Marita Kramer	Austria	126.5	135.2	3	127.5	146.7	4	281.9
5	38	Silje Opseth	Norway	124.0	132.0	5	138.0	145.1	6	277.1
6	36	Ema Klinec	Slovenia	120.0	127.0	7	139.5	146.3	5	273.3
7	33	Irina Avvakumova	Russian Ski Federation	122.5	127.9	6	126.5	137.8	8	265.7
8	29	Chiara Hölzl	Austria	120.5	123.1	8	133.0	139.5	7	262.6
9	35	Daniela Iraschko-Stolz	Austria	116.5	118.2	9	128.0	133.8	9	252.0
10	13	Juliane Seyfarth	Germany	118.0	115.5	11	123.0	127.2	11	242.7
11	31	Urša Bogataj	Slovenia	117.0	116.2	10	126.0	124.4	14	240.6
12	32	Katharina Althaus	Germany	113.5	113.7	12	121.0	126.7	12	240.4
13	27	Yuki Ito	Japan	114.5	112.3	14	122.0	126.2	13	238.5
14	23	Thea Minyan Bjørseth	Norway	114.0	111.0	15	120.5	124.1	15	235.1
15	25	Anna Rupprecht	Germany	116.5	112.4	13	118.5	116.7	17	229.1
16	24	Jerneja Brecl	Slovenia	106.5	95.8	18	122.5	127.6	10	223.4
17	30	Sophie Sorschag	Austria	107.0	98.6	17	117.5	116.8	16	215.4
18	28	Nozomi Maruyama	Japan	112.0	105.8	16	109.0	102.4	22	208.2
19	19	Luisa Görlich	Germany	106.0	94.5	19	112.0	108.1	20	202.6
20	26	Julia Clair	France	104.0	90.2	21	112.5	108.3	19	198.5
21	17	Julia Kykkänen	Finland	100.0	83.8	24	114.0	111.6	18	195.4
22	21	Joséphine Pagnier	France	103.0	89.7	22	110.0	104.0	21	193.7
23	20	Sofia Tikhonova	Russian Ski Federation	106.0	92.8	20	109.0	99.2	25	192.0
24	10	Anna Twardosz	Poland	100.5	82.6	25	108.0	101.8	24	184.4
25	14	Karolína Indráčková	Czech Republic	99.0	79.8	27	109.0	102.3	23	182.1
26	9	Anna Shpyneva	Russian Ski Federation	101.5	84.2	23	104.0	88.9	28	173.1
27	22	Anna Odine Strøm	Norway	99.0	80.7	26	102.5	89.9	27	170.6
28	2	Abigail Strate	Canada	99.0	78.3	28	103.0	91.3	26	169.6
29	16	Kaori Iwabuchi	Japan	96.0	76.1	29	97.0	78.7	29	154.8
30	18	Irma Makhinia	Russian Ski Federation	97.0	74.2	30	94.0	68.9	30	143.1
31	12	Daniela Haralambie	Romania	95.0	71.9	31	did not qualify			
32	11	Jenny Rautionaho	Finland	94.5	70.4	32	did not qualify			
33	7	Kinga Rajda	Poland	92.0	66.7	33	did not qualify			
34	8	Kamila Karpiel	Poland	91.0	62.7	34	did not qualify			
35	5	Nicole Konderla	Poland	89.0	57.9	35	did not qualify			
36	15	Klára Ulrichová	Czech Republic	90.0	57.4	36	did not qualify			
37	4	Susanna Forsström	Finland	88.5	56.8	37	did not qualify			
38	3	Alexandria Loutitt	Canada	85.5	52.9	38	did not qualify			
39	1	Paige Jones	United States	86.0	50.7	39	did not qualify			
40	6	Natalie Eilers	Canada	83.5	48.2	40	did not qualify			
