= FIS Nordic World Ski Championships 2015 – Mixed team normal hill =

Mixed team normal hill at the FIS Nordic World Ski Championships 2015
- Date: 22 February 2015
- Competitors: 44 from 11 nations
- Winning points: 917.9

Medalists
gold medal	Carina Vogt; Richard Freitag; Katharina Althaus; Severin Freund	Germany
silver medal	Line Jahr; Anders Bardal; Maren Lundby; Rune Velta	Norway
bronze medal	Sara Takanashi; Noriaki Kasai; Yuki Ito; Taku Takeuchi	Japan

The Mixed team normal hill event of the FIS Nordic World Ski Championships 2015 was held on 22 February 2015.

== Results ==
The first round was started at 17:02 and the second round at 18:14.

Rank	Bib	Country	Round 1 Distance (m)	Round 1 Points	Round 1 Rank	Final Round Distance (m)	Final Round Points	Final Round Rank	Total Points
1st place, gold medalist(s)	10	Germany; Carina Vogt; Richard Freitag; Katharina Althaus; Severin Freund	93.5; 93.5; 91.0; 97.0	453.2; 108.7; 115.0; 107.3; 122.2	2	92.0; 92.0; 92.5; 96.0	464.7; 112.7; 115.7; 108.7; 127.6	1	917.9; 221.4; 230.7; 216.0; 249.8
2nd place, silver medalist(s)	8	Norway; Line Jahr; Anders Bardal; Maren Lundby; Rune Velta	93.5; 92.5; 95.0; 95.0	455.7; 108.1; 111.8; 116.4; 119.4	1	90.5; 89.5; 91.5; 95.5	459.9; 107.9; 110.6; 115.5; 125.9	2	915.6; 216.0; 222.4; 231.9; 245.3
3rd place, bronze medalist(s)	7	Japan; Sara Takanashi; Noriaki Kasai; Yuki Ito; Taku Takeuchi	96.5; 90.0; 88.5; 95.0	437.8; 112.1; 105.8; 101.7; 118.2	3	93.0; 88.5; 90.5; 93.5	450.5; 114.2; 107.4; 110.1; 118.8	3	888.3; 226.3; 213.2; 211.8; 237.0
4	11	Austria; Daniela Iraschko-Stolz; Michael Hayböck; Jacqueline Seifriedsberger; Stefan Kraft	95.5; 83.0; 96.5; 91.0	428.7; 113.6; 93.6; 109.9; 111.6	4	92.5; 87.5; 90.0; 95.0	440.8; 112.9; 101.7; 106.5; 119.7	5	869.5; 226.5; 195.3; 216.4; 231.3
5	9	Slovenia; Maja Vtič; Nejc Dežman; Špela Rogelj; Peter Prevc	88.5; 90.0; 90.5; 95.5	427.3; 97.7; 103.6; 108.1; 117.9	5	85.5; 86.5; 92.5; 94.5	441.1; 98.4; 104.8; 115.2; 122.7	4	868.4; 196.1; 208.4; 223.3; 240.6
6	4	Russia; Irina Avvakumova; Ilmir Hazetdinov; Sofia Tikhonova; Mikhail Maksimochkin	88.0; 83.5; 87.0; 83.5	382.2; 99.1; 88.9; 99.9; 94.3	8	91.5; 85.0; 89.0; 86.5	409.6; 108.9; 95.5; 106.2; 99.0	6	791.8; 208.0; 184.4; 206.1; 193.3
7	5	United States; Nita Englund; Nicholas Alexander; Sarah Hendrickson; William Rhoads	94.0; 82.5; 98.5; 78.5	395.5; 107.3; 86.7; 120.8; 80.7	6	87.5; 90.5; 94.0; 83.0	393.8; 102.0; 84.5; 115.8; 91.5	7	789.3; 209.3; 171.2; 236.6; 172.2
8	2	France; Léa Lemare; Ronan Lamy Chappuis; Julia Clair; Vincent Descombes Sevoie	82.5; 84.0; 88.0; 91.0	387.8; 87.0; 95.6; 100.1; 105.1	7	83.0; 86.0; 86.5; 85.0	385.4; 90.6; 98.6; 98.9; 97.3	8	773.2; 177.6; 194.2; 199.0; 202.4
9	1	Italy; Elena Runggaldier; Sebastian Colloredo; Evelyn Insam; Davide Bresadola	84.0; 83.5; 86.0; 91.5	374.5; 85.6; 87.7; 94.7; 106.5	9				
10	3	Finland; Julia Kykkänen; Jarkko Määttä; Susanna Forsström; Janne Ahonen	86.0; 87.5; 76.5; 89.0	369.5; 96.8; 97.4; 72.1; 103.2	10				
11	6	Czech Republic; Michaela Doleželová; Viktor Polášek; Barbora Blažková; Jan Matura	85.0; 84.0; 80.5; 84.0	351.2; 86.2; 90.9; 80.0; 94.1	11				
