= Carina Vogt =

German ski jumper

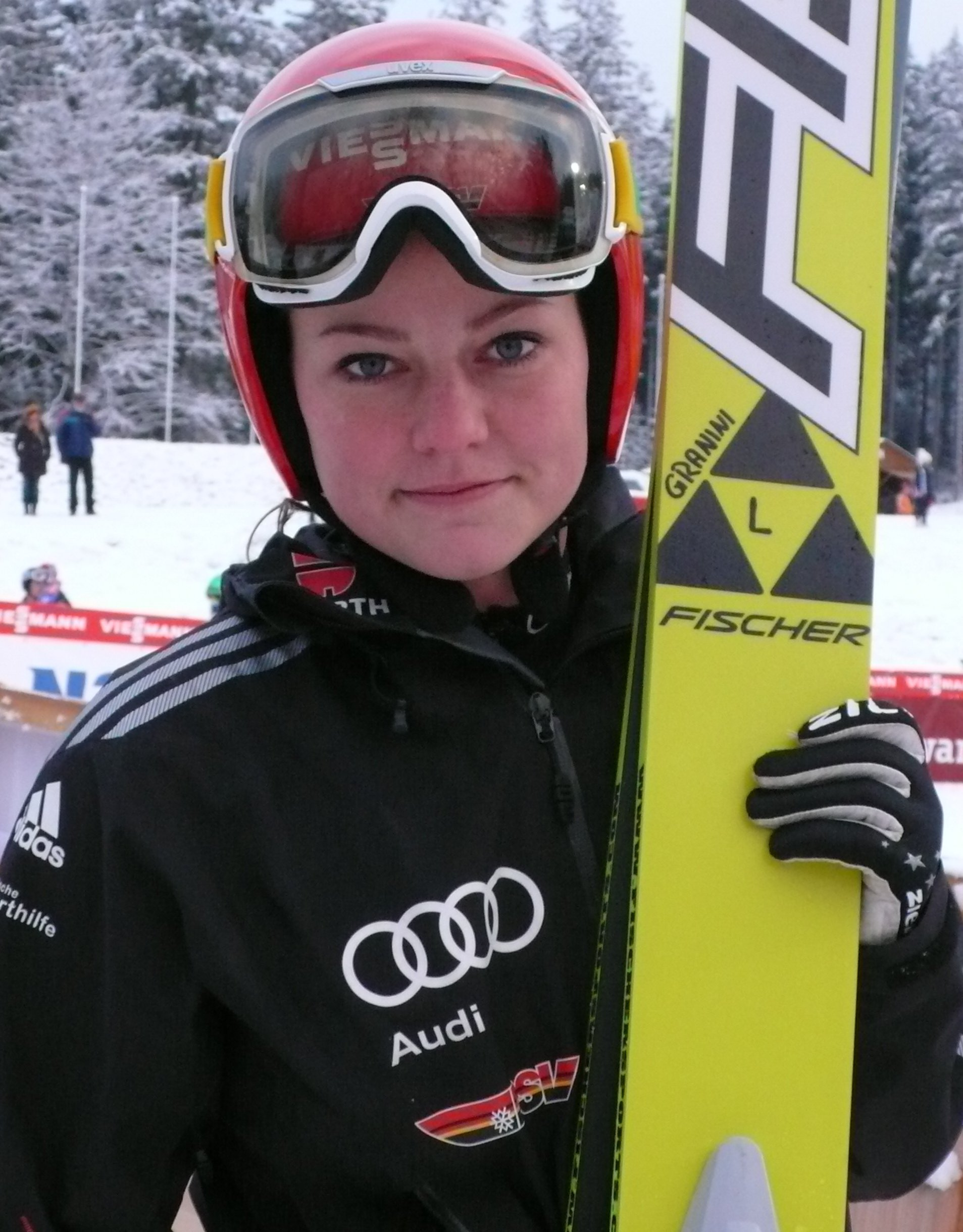

Personal information
- Nationality: Germany
- Born: 5 February 1992 (age 34) Schwäbisch Gmünd, Germany
- Height: 1.71 m (5 ft 7 in)

Sport
- Sport: Skiing
- Club: Ski-Club Degenfeld

World Cup career
- Seasons: 2012–2019; 2021–2022
- Indiv. starts: 124
- Indiv. podiums: 22
- Indiv. wins: 2
- Team starts: 5
- Team podiums: 2
- Team wins: 2

Achievements and titles
- Personal bests: 135 m (443 ft); Bischofshofen
Medal record
Women's ski jumping
Representing Germany
Olympic Games
Gold medal – first place	2014 Sochi	Individual NH
World Championships
Gold medal – first place	2015 Falun	Individual NH
Gold medal – first place	2015 Falun	Mixed team NH
Gold medal – first place	2017 Lahti	Individual NH
Gold medal – first place	2017 Lahti	Mixed team NH
Gold medal – first place	2019 Seefeld	Team NH
Bronze medal – third place	2013 Val di Fiemme	Mixed team NH
- Updated on 13 March 2022

Carina Vogt (born 5 February 1992) is a German former ski jumper.

== Career ==
She won the first Olympic gold medal ever awarded for women's ski jumping, at the 2014 Sochi Winter Olympic Games. Vogt's international debut was in the Meinerzhagen competition. She participated in the FIS Ski Jumping Continental Cup from 2006 to 2012. Vogt's debut in the FIS Ski Jumping World Cup took place in January 2012 in Hinterzarten. She achieved her first World Cup victory on 18 January 2015 in Zaō, Japan.

At the Nordic World Ski Championships 2013 in Val di Fiemme, she won the bronze medal in the mixed normal hill competition together with Ulrike Gräßler, Richard Freitag, and Severin Freund.

At the Nordic World Ski Championships 2015 in Falun, she won the gold medal in the individual normal hill competition. With the German team (Richard Freitag, Katharina Althaus, and Severin Freund), she won another gold medal in the mixed normal hill competition.

She was able to repeat both wins two years later at the Nordic World Ski Championships 2017 in Lahti. This time with her German teammates Markus Eisenbichler, Svenja Würth, and Andreas Wellinger.

== World Championship results ==
Year	Normal hill	Large hill	Team NH	Mixed team
2013	5	—N/a		3
2015	1	—N/a		1
2017	1	—N/a		1
2019	10	—N/a	1	—
2021	30	—	—	—

== World Cup ==
=== Standings ===
Season	Overall	ST	L3	RA	BB
2011/12	27	N/A	N/A	N/A	N/A
2012/13	7	N/A	N/A	N/A	N/A
2013/14	2nd place, silver medalist(s)	N/A	N/A	N/A	N/A
2014/15	3rd place, bronze medalist(s)	N/A	N/A	N/A	N/A
2015/16	11	N/A	N/A	N/A	N/A
2016/17	5	N/A	N/A	N/A	N/A
2017/18	6	N/A	5	N/A	N/A
2018/19	9	N/A	8	14	16
2020/21	32	N/A	N/A	N/A	—
2021/22	—	48	N/A	—	N/A

=== Wins ===
No.	Season	Date	Location	Hill	Size
1	2014/15	18 January 2015	(Japan) Zaō	Yamagata HS100	NH
2	2014/15	1 February 2015	(Austria) Hinzenbach	Aigner-Schanze HS94	NH
