= Juliane Seyfarth =

German ski jumper (born 1990)

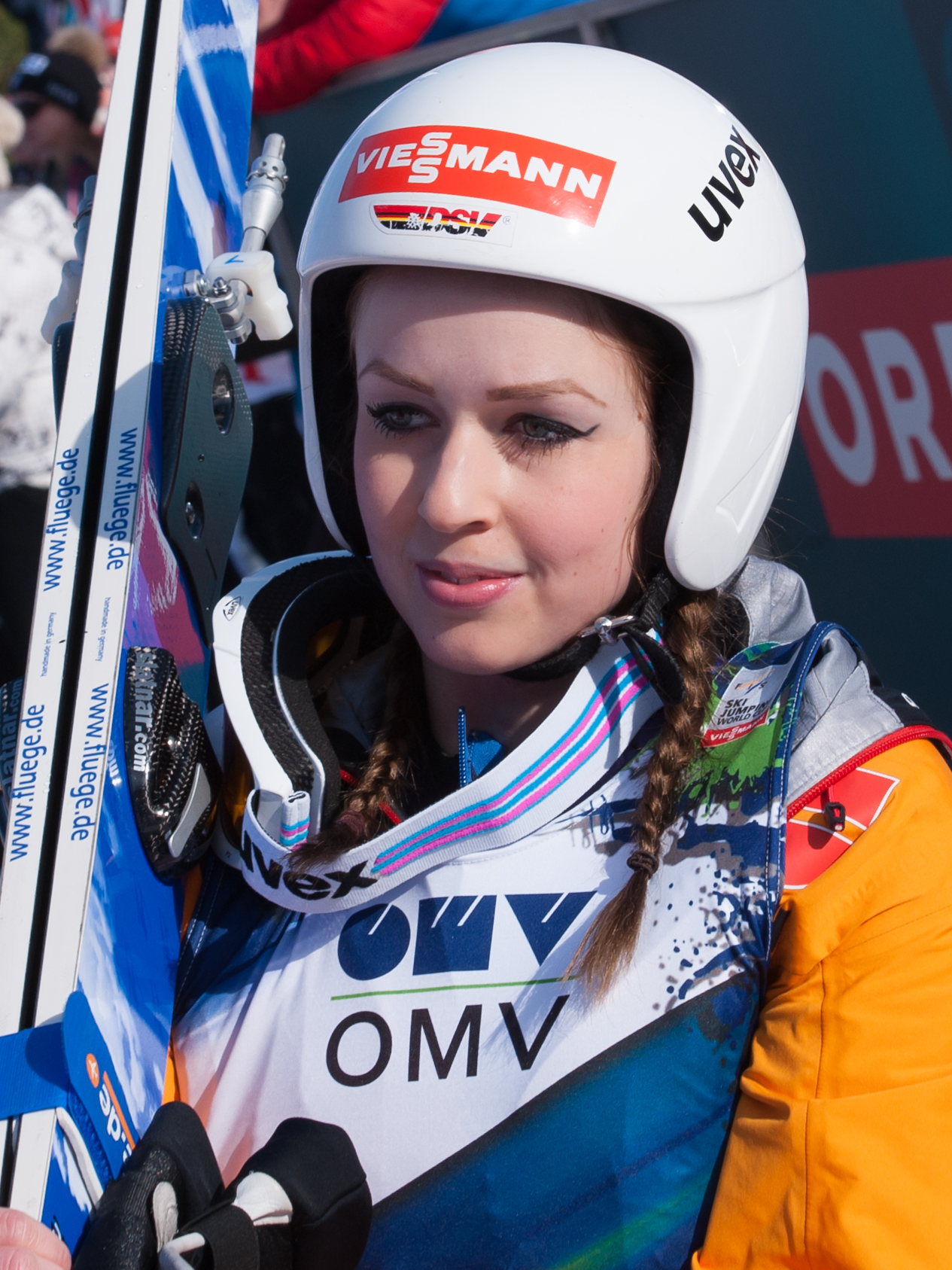
- Seyfarth in 2015

Personal information
- Nationality: Germany
- Born: 19 February 1990 (age 36) Eisenach, East Germany
- Height: 1.60 m (5 ft 3 in)

Sport
- Sport: Skiing
- Club: WSC 07 Ruhla

World Cup career
- Seasons: 2012–present
- Indiv. starts: 205
- Indiv. podiums: 13
- Indiv. wins: 4
- Team starts: 11
- Team podiums: 3
- Team wins: 2

Achievements and titles
- Personal bests: 207.5 m (681 ft); Vikersund, 22 March 2026
Medal record
World Championships
Gold medal – first place	2019 Seefeld	Team NH
Gold medal – first place	2019 Seefeld	Mixed team NH
Bronze medal – third place	2025 Trondheim	Team NH
- Updated on 22 March 2026

Juliane Seyfarth (born 19 February 1990) is a German ski jumper.

== Career ==
She made her debut in the Continental Cup, the highest level in women's ski jumping, on 23 July 2004 with a 13th place in Park City. She has finished among the top three 15 times, with seven wins and seven-second places.

On 5 February 2006, she became the first official junior world champion in ski jumping, after winning the women's competition 2006 Nordic Junior World Ski Championships in Kranj.

She was selected to compete for Germany in the 2011 World Championship in Oslo. She represents WSC 07 Ruhla club.

== World Championship results ==
Year	Normal hill	Large hill	Team NH	Mixed team
2011	31	—N/a		
2013	—	—N/a		—
2015	14	—N/a		—
2017	—	—N/a		—
2019	4	—N/a	1	1
2021	21	10	5	—
2025	27	13	3	—

== World Cup ==
=== Standings ===
Season	Overall	ST	AK	L3	RA	BB
2011/12	36	N/A	N/A	N/A	N/A	N/A
2012/13	44	N/A	N/A	N/A	N/A	N/A
2013/14	43	N/A	N/A	N/A	N/A	N/A
2014/15	16	N/A	N/A	N/A	N/A	N/A
2015/16	14	N/A	N/A	N/A	N/A	N/A
2016/17	29	N/A	N/A	N/A	N/A	N/A
2017/18	12	N/A	N/A	10	N/A	N/A
2018/19	3rd place, bronze medalist(s)	N/A	N/A	2nd place, silver medalist(s)	3rd place, bronze medalist(s)	1st place, gold medalist(s)
2019/20	11	N/A	N/A	N/A	10	N/A
2020/21	28	N/A	N/A	N/A	N/A	17
2021/22	26	25	—	N/A	32	N/A
2022/23	36	—	N/A	N/A	36	N/A
2023/24	28	N/A	N/A	N/A	20	N/A

=== Individual wins ===
No.	Season	Date	Location	Hill	Size
1	2018/19	30 November 2018	(Norway) Lillehammer	Lysgårdsbakken HS98 (night)	NH
2	2018/19	16 March 2019	(Russia) Nizhny Tagil	Tramplin Stork HS97	NH
3	2018/19	17 March 2019	(Russia) Nizhny Tagil	Tramplin Stork HS97	NH
4	2018/19	23 March 2019	(Russia) Chaykovsky	Snezhinka HS102	NH
