= Yuki Ito (ski jumper) =

Japanese ski jumper (born 1994)

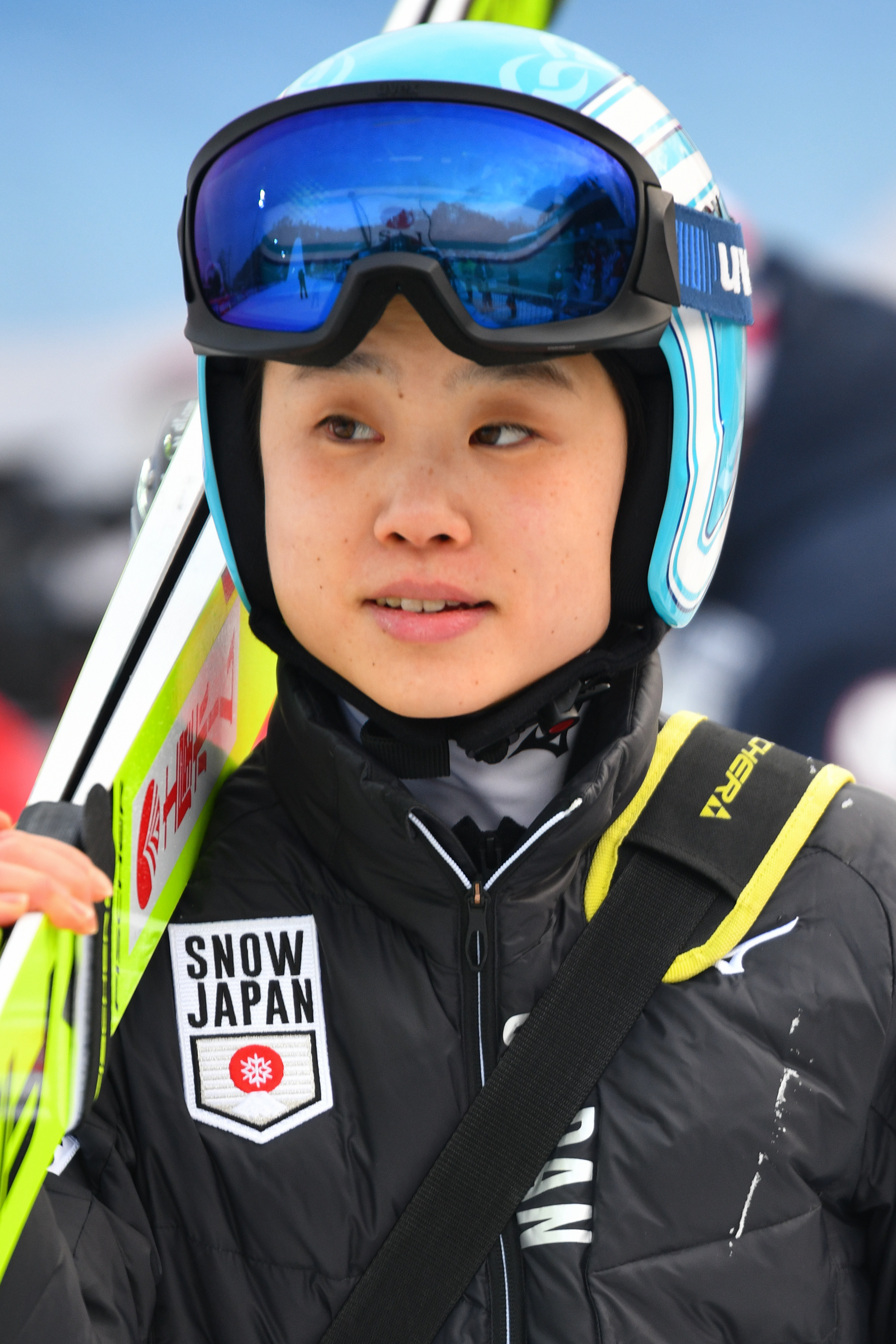
- Ito in 2023

Personal information
- Born: 10 May 1994 (age 32) Kamikawa, Hokkaido, Japan
- Height: 1.61 m (5 ft 3 in)

Sport
- Sport: Ski jumping
- Club: Tsuchiya Home Ski Team

World Cup career
- Seasons: 2012–present
- Indiv. starts: 269
- Indiv. podiums: 29
- Indiv. wins: 10
- Team starts: 21
- Team podiums: 8
- Team wins: 4

Achievements and titles
- Personal bests: 219 m (719 ft); Vikersund, 22 March 2026
Medal record
Representing Japan
Women's ski jumping
World Championships
Gold medal – first place	2013 Val di Fiemme	Mixed team NH
Silver medal – second place	2015 Falun	Individual NH
Silver medal – second place	2017 Lahti	Individual NH
Bronze medal – third place	2015 Falun	Mixed team NH
Bronze medal – third place	2017 Lahti	Mixed team NH
- Updated on 22 November 2026

Yuki Ito (伊藤 有希, Itō Yūki; born 10 May 1994) is a Japanese ski jumper.

Ito has won ten individual World Cup events, four team events, and finished as the overall runner-up in the 2016–17 season. At the World Championships she has won five medals, including a mixed team gold.

== Career ==
Ito's debut in the FIS Ski Jumping World Cup took place in February 2012 in Hinzenbach. At the 2013 FIS Nordic World Ski Championships in Val di Fiemme, Ito won the gold medal with the Japanese team in the mixed event at normal hill. She won her first individual World Cup event on 14 January 2017 in Sapporo.

She competed at the 2014 Winter Olympics, finishing seventh in the women's normal hill individual competition. She also competed at the 2018 Winter Olympics in the same event.

With the Japan national team, Ito won the first-ever women's World Cup team competition in Hinterzarten on 16 December 2017. Her teammates included Kaori Iwabuchi, Yuka Seto and Sara Takanashi.

== Major tournament results ==
=== Winter Olympics ===
Year	Normal	Large	Mixed
(Russia) 2014 Sochi	7	N/A	N/A
(South Korea) 2018 Pyeongchang	9	N/A	N/A
(China) 2022 Beijing	13	N/A	4
(Italy) 2026 Milano Cortina	17	14	—

=== FIS Nordic World Ski Championships ===
Year	NH	LH	Team	Mixed
(Czech Republic) 2009 Liberec	17	N/A	N/A	N/A
(Norway) 2011 Oslo	15	N/A	N/A	N/A
(Italy) 2013 Val di Fiemme	20	N/A	N/A	1st place, gold medalist(s)
(Sweden) 2015 Falun	2nd place, silver medalist(s)	N/A	N/A	3rd place, bronze medalist(s)
(Finland) 2017 Lahti	2nd place, silver medalist(s)	N/A	N/A	3rd place, bronze medalist(s)
(Austria) 2019 Seefeld	15	N/A	6	5
(Germany) 2021 Oberstdorf	11	13	4	5
(Slovenia) 2023 Planica	6	11	5	5
(Norway) 2025 Trondheim	9	9	5	5

== World Cup results ==
=== Overall standings ===
Season	Position	Points
2011–12	20	130
2012–13	18	210
2013–14	3	759
2014–15	5	434
2015–16	8	505
2016–17	2	1,208
2017–18	4	661
2018–19	12	571
2019–20	12	380
2020–21	14	245
2021–22	8	449
2022–23	8	766
2023–24	4	1,018
2024–25	13	509
2025–26	13	701

=== Individual wins ===
No.	Season	Date	Location	Hill	Size
1	2016–17	14 January 2017	(Japan) Sapporo	Miyanomori HS100	NH
2	2016–17	20 January 2017	(Japan) Zaō	Yamagata HS103	NH
3	2016–17	21 January 2017	(Japan) Zaō	Yamagata HS103	NH
4	2016–17	15 February 2017	(South Korea) Pyeongchang	Alpensia Ski Jumping Centre HS109	NH
5	2016–17	12 March 2017	(Norway) Oslo	Holmenkollbakken HS134	LH
6	2022–23	5 February 2023	(Germany) Willingen	Mühlenkopfschanze HS147	LH
7	2022–23	24 March 2023	(Finland) Lahti	Salpausselkä HS130	LH
8	2023–24	2 December 2023	(Norway) Lillehammer	Lysgårdsbakken HS98	NH
9	2023–24	14 January 2024	(Japan) Sapporo	Okurayama HS134	LH
10	2025–26	15 March 2026	(Norway) Oslo	Holmenkollbakken HS134	LH
