= Sara Takanashi =

Japanese ski jumper (born 1996)

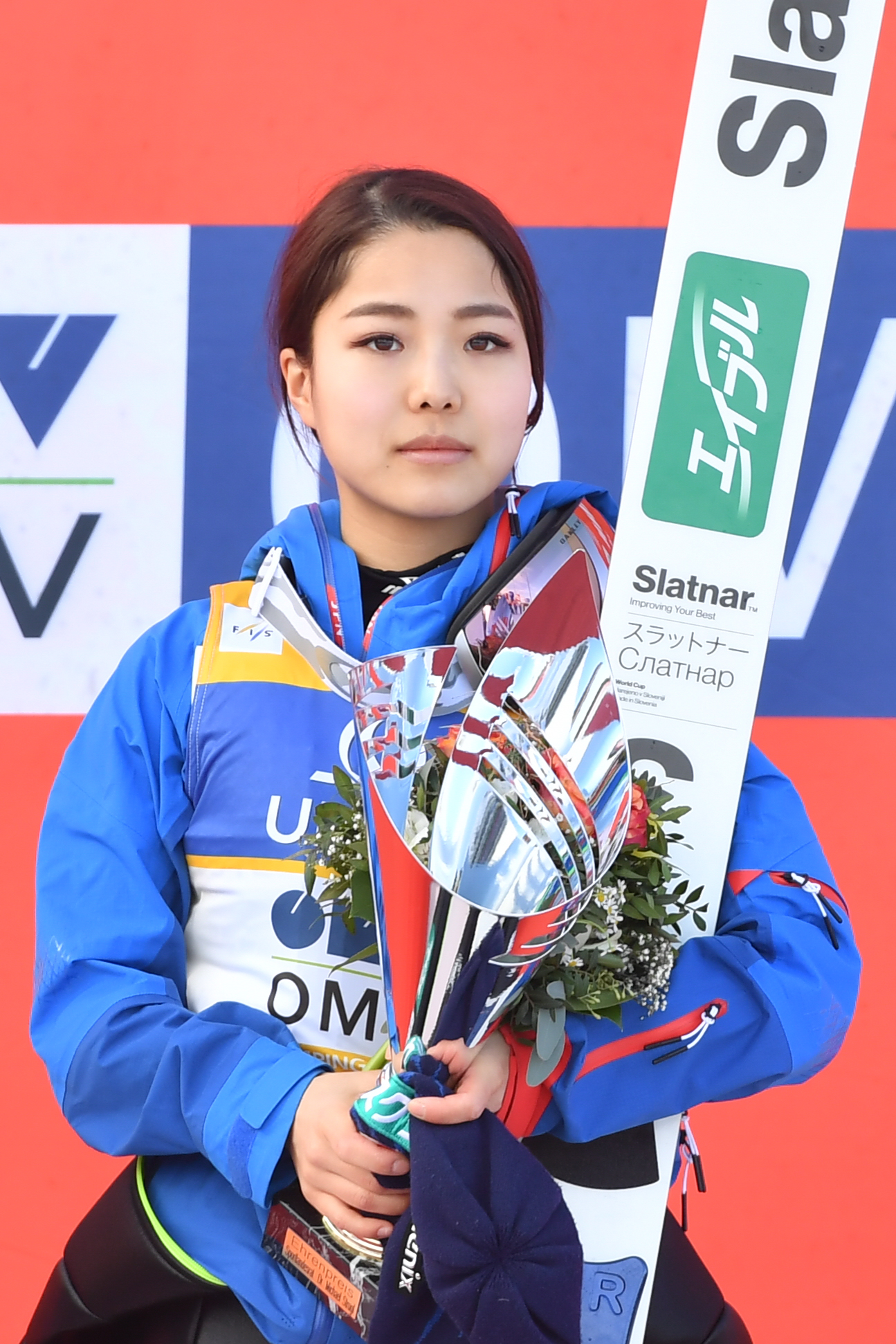
- Takanashi in Hinzenbach, 2017

Personal information
- Born: 8 October 1996 (age 30) Kamikawa, Hokkaido, Japan
- Height: 1.52 m (5 ft 0 in)

Sport
- Sport: Ski jumping
- Club: Kuraray

World Cup career
- Seasons: 2012–present
- Indiv. starts: 274
- Indiv. podiums: 116
- Indiv. wins: 63
- Team starts: 20
- Team podiums: 7
- Team wins: 3
- Overall titles: 4 (2013, 2014, 2016, 2017)

Achievements and titles
- Personal bests: 211.5 m (694 ft); Vikersund, 22 March 2026
Medal record
Women's ski jumping
Representing Japan
Olympic Games
Bronze medal – third place	2018 Pyeongchang	Individual NH
Bronze medal – third place	2026 Milano Cortina	Mixed team NH
World Championships
Gold medal – first place	2013 Val di Fiemme	Mixed team NH
Silver medal – second place	2013 Val di Fiemme	Individual NH
Silver medal – second place	2021 Oberstdorf	Individual LH
Bronze medal – third place	2015 Falun	Mixed team NH
Bronze medal – third place	2017 Lahti	Individual NH
Bronze medal – third place	2017 Lahti	Mixed team NH
Bronze medal – third place	2021 Oberstdorf	Individual NH
Youth Olympic Games
Gold medal – first place	2012 Innsbruck	Individual NH
- Updated on 22 November 2026

Sara Takanashi (高梨 沙羅, Takanashi Sara) (born 8 October 1996) is a Japanese ski jumper. She is one of the most successful female ski jumpers to date, as well as one of the most successful athletes in the history of the sport, having won four World Cup overall titles (an all-time female record), seven World Championship medals, and two bronze Winter Olympics medals. As of November 2026, Takanashi holds the record for the most individual World Cup wins, male or female, with 63. She also has three Guinness World Records certificates for the most podium finishes in the Ski Jumping World Cup, the most individual victories by a female in the Ski Jumping World Cup, and the most Ski Jumping World Cup individual victories in a career (overall).

== Career ==
Takanashi placed sixth at the 2011 World Championship in Oslo. In the World Cup, she debuted on 3 December 2011 in Lillehammer where she finished fifth.

During the 2013–14 season, Takanashi won 15 out of 18 individual World Cup ski jumping events. At the 2014 Winter Olympics, she was ranked third after her first jump in the medal round, but dropped to fourth place in the final round and missed the podium. In the 2015–16 season, she won her third World Cup overall title.

With the Japan national team, Takanashi won the first-ever women's World Cup team competition in Hinterzarten on 16 December 2017. Her teammates included Yuki Ito, Kaori Iwabuchi and Yuka Seto.

She won a bronze medal in the individual normal hill event at the 2018 Winter Olympics in Pyeongchang.

== Major tournament results ==
=== Winter Olympics ===
Year	Normal	Large	Mixed
(Russia) 2014 Sochi	4	N/A	N/A
(South Korea) 2018 Pyeongchang	3rd place, bronze medalist(s)	N/A	N/A
(China) 2022 Beijing	4	N/A	4
(Italy) 2026 Milano Cortina	13	16	3rd place, bronze medalist(s)

=== FIS Nordic World Ski Championships ===
Year	Normal	Large	Team	Mixed
(Norway) 2011 Oslo	6	N/A	N/A	N/A
(Italy) 2013 Val di Fiemme	2nd place, silver medalist(s)	N/A	N/A	1st place, gold medalist(s)
(Sweden) 2015 Falun	4	N/A	N/A	3rd place, bronze medalist(s)
(Finland) 2017 Lahti	3rd place, bronze medalist(s)	N/A	N/A	3rd place, bronze medalist(s)
(Austria) 2019 Seefeld	6	N/A	6	5
(Germany) 2021 Oberstdorf	3rd place, bronze medalist(s)	2nd place, silver medalist(s)	4	5
(Slovenia) 2023 Planica	20	—	—	—
(Norway) 2025 Trondheim	14	12	5	5

== World Cup results ==
=== Overall standings ===
Season	Position	Points
2011–12	3	639
2012–13	1	1,297
2013–14	1	1,720
2014–15	2	973
2015–16	1	1,610
2016–17	1	1,455
2017–18	3	916
2018–19	4	1,190
2019–20	4	785
2020–21	2	862
2021–22	5	843
2022–23	10	674
2023–24	9	799
2024–25	12	601
2025–26	9	931

=== Individual wins ===
No.	Season	Date	Location	Hill	Size
1	2011–12	3 March 2012	(Japan) Zaō	Yamagata HS100	NH
2	2012–13	24 November 2012	(Norway) Lillehammer	Lysgårdsbakken HS100	NH
3	2012–13	14 December 2012	(Austria) Ramsau	W90-Mattensprunganlage HS98	NH
4	2012–13	5 January 2013	(Germany) Schonach	Langenwaldschanze HS106	NH
5	2012–13	13 January 2013	(Germany) Hinterzarten	Rothaus-Schanze HS108	NH
6	2012–13	10 February 2013	(Japan) Zaō	Yamagata HS100	NH
7	2012–13	10 February 2013	(Japan) Zaō	Yamagata HS100	NH
8	2012–13	16 February 2013	(Slovenia) Ljubno ob Savinji	Savina Ski Jumping Center HS95	NH
9	2012–13	17 February 2013	(Slovenia) Ljubno ob Savinji	Savina Ski Jumping Center HS95	NH
10	2013–14	7 December 2013	(Norway) Lillehammer	Lysgårdsbakken HS100	NH
11	2013–14	21 December 2013	(Germany) Hinterzarten	Rothaus-Schanze HS108	NH
12	2013–14	22 December 2013	(Germany) Hinterzarten	Rothaus-Schanze HS108	NH
13	2013–14	3 January 2014	(Russia) Chaykovsky	Snezhinka HS106	NH
14	2013–14	11 January 2014	(Japan) Sapporo	Miyanomori HS100	NH
15	2013–14	12 January 2014	(Japan) Sapporo	Miyanomori HS100	NH
16	2013–14	18 January 2014	(Japan) Zaō	Yamagata HS100	NH
17	2013–14	19 January 2014	(Japan) Zaō	Yamagata HS100	NH
18	2013–14	1 February 2014	(Austria) Hinzenbach	Aigner-Schanze HS94	NH
19	2013–14	2 February 2014	(Austria) Hinzenbach	Aigner-Schanze HS94	NH
20	2013–14	1 March 2014	(Romania) Râșnov	Trambulina Valea Cărbunării HS100	NH
21	2013–14	2 March 2014	(Romania) Râșnov	Trambulina Valea Cărbunării HS100	NH
22	2013–14	8 March 2014	(Norway) Oslo	Holmenkollbakken HS134	LH
23	2013–14	15 March 2014	(Sweden) Falun	Lugnet HS98	NH
24	2013–14	22 March 2014	(Slovenia) Planica	Bloudkova velikanka HS139	LH
25	2014–15	10 January 2015	(Japan) Sapporo	Miyanomori HS100	NH
26	2014–15	11 January 2015	(Japan) Sapporo	Miyanomori HS100	NH
27	2014–15	8 February 2015	(Romania) Râșnov	Trambulina Valea Cărbunării HS100	NH
28	2014–15	14 February 2015	(Slovenia) Ljubno ob Savinji	Savina Ski Jumping Center HS95	NH
29	2014–15	15 February 2015	(Slovenia) Ljubno ob Savinji	Savina Ski Jumping Center HS95	NH
30	2014–15	13 March 2015	(Norway) Oslo	Holmenkollbakken HS134	LH
31	2015–16	4 December 2015	(Norway) Lillehammer	Lysgårdsbakken HS100	NH
32	2015–16	13 December 2015	(Russia) Nizhny Tagil	Tramplin Stork HS97	NH
33	2015–16	16 January 2016	(Japan) Sapporo	Miyanomori HS100	NH
34	2015–16	17 January 2016	(Japan) Sapporo	Miyanomori HS100	NH
35	2015–16	22 January 2016	(Japan) Zaō	Yamagata HS106	NH
36	2015–16	23 January 2016	(Japan) Zaō	Yamagata HS106	NH
37	2015–16	30 January 2016	(Germany) Oberstdorf	Schattenbergschanze HS106	NH
38	2015–16	31 January 2016	(Germany) Oberstdorf	Schattenbergschanze HS106	NH
39	2015–16	4 February 2016	(Norway) Oslo	Holmenkollbakken HS134	LH
40	2015–16	6 February 2016	(Austria) Hinzenbach	Aigner-Schanze HS94	NH
41	2015–16	7 February 2016	(Austria) Hinzenbach	Aigner-Schanze HS94	NH
42	2015–16	19 February 2016	(Finland) Lahti	Salpausselkä HS100	NH
43	2015–16	27 February 2016	(Kazakhstan) Almaty	Sunkar HS106	NH
44	2015–16	28 February 2016	(Kazakhstan) Almaty	Sunkar HS106	NH
45	2016–17	2 December 2016	(Norway) Lillehammer	Lysgårdsbakken HS100	NH
46	2016–17	3 December 2016	(Norway) Lillehammer	Lysgårdsbakken HS100	NH
47	2016–17	11 December 2016	(Russia) Nizhny Tagil	Tramplin Stork HS100	NH
48	2016–17	7 January 2017	(Germany) Oberstdorf	Schattenbergschanze HS137	LH
49	2016–17	8 January 2017	(Germany) Oberstdorf	Schattenbergschanze HS137	LH
50	2016–17	29 January 2017	(Romania) Râșnov	Trambulina Valea Cărbunării HS100	NH
51	2016–17	4 February 2017	(Austria) Hinzenbach	Aigner-Schanze HS94	NH
52	2016–17	5 February 2017	(Austria) Hinzenbach	Aigner-Schanze HS94	NH
53	2016–17	16 February 2017	(South Korea) Pyeongchang	Alpensia Ski Jumping Centre HS109	NH
54	2017–18	24 March 2018	(Germany) Oberstdorf	Schattenbergschanze HS106	NH
55	2017–18	25 March 2018	(Germany) Oberstdorf	Schattenbergschanze HS106	NH
56	2018–19	10 February 2019	(Slovenia) Ljubno ob Savinji	Savina Ski Jumping Center HS94	NH
57	2019–20	9 March 2020	(Norway) Lillehammer	Lysgårdsbakken HS140	LH
58	2020–21	6 February 2021	(Austria) Hinzenbach	Aigner-Schanze HS90	NH
59	2020–21	7 February 2021	(Austria) Hinzenbach	Aigner-Schanze HS90	NH
60	2020–21	19 February 2021	(Romania) Râșnov	Trambulina Valea Cărbunării HS97	NH
61	2021–22	1 January 2022	(Slovenia) Ljubno ob Savinji	Savina Ski Jumping Center HS94	NH
62	2021–22	2 March 2022	(Norway) Lillehammer	Lysgårdsbakken HS140	LH
63	2021–22	6 March 2022	(Norway) Oslo	Holmenkollbakken HS134	LH

=== Individual starts ===
winner (1); second (2); third (3); did not compete (–); disqualified (DQ)
Season	1	2	3	4	5	6	7	8	9	10	11	12	13	14	15	16	17	18	19	20	21	22	23	24	25	26
2011–12	Lillehammer	Hinterzten	Hinterzten	Val di Fiemme	Val di Fiemme	Hinzenbach	Hinzenbach	Ljubno ob Savinji	Ljubno ob Savinji	Zaō Onsen	Zaō Onsen	Zaō Onsen	Oslo
2011–12	5	17	2	–	–	–	–	2	2	1	2	2	2
2012–13	Lillehammer	Sochi	Sochi	Ramsau am Dachstein	Schonach	Schonach	Hinterzten	Hinterzten	Sapporo	Sapporo	Zaō Onsen	Zaō Onsen	Ljubno ob Savinji	Ljubno ob Savinji	Trondheim	Oslo
2012–13	1	2	3	1	1	4	2	1	12	5	1	1	1	1	2	2
2013–14	Lillehammer	Hinterzten	Hinterzten	Chaykovsky, Perm Krai	Chaykovsky, Perm Krai	Sapporo	Sapporo	Zaō Onsen	Zaō Onsen	Planica	Planica	Hinzenbach	Hinzenbach	Râșnov	Râșnov	Oslo	Falun	Planica
2013–14	1	1	1	1	3	1	1	1	1	2	2	1	1	1	1	1	1	1
2014–15	Lillehammer	Sapporo	Sapporo	Zaō Onsen	Oberstdorf	Oberstdorf	Hinzenbach	Hinzenbach	Râșnov	Râșnov	Ljubno ob Savinji	Ljubno ob Savinji	Oslo
2014–15	3	1	1	7	3	5	3	8	2	1	1	1	1
2015–16	Lillehammer	Nizhny Tagil	Nizhny Tagil	Sapporo	Sapporo	Zaō Onsen	Zaō Onsen	Oberstdorf	Oberstdorf	Oslo	Hinzenbach	Hinzenbach	Ljubno ob Savinji	Ljubno ob Savinji	Lahti	Almaty	Almaty
2015–16	1	2	1	1	1	1	1	1	1	1	1	1	2	4	1	1	1
2016–17	Lillehammer	Lillehammer	Nizhny Tagil	Nizhny Tagil	Oberstdorf	Oberstdorf	Sapporo	Sapporo	Zaō Onsen	Zaō Onsen	Râșnov	Râșnov	Hinzenbach	Hinzenbach	Ljubno ob Savinji	Ljubno ob Savinji	Pyeongchang	Pyeongchang	Oslo
2016–17	1	1	3	1	1	1	2	4	5	2	2	1	1	1	–	–	2	1	2
2017–18	Lillehammer	Lillehammer	Lillehammer	Hinterzarten	Sapporo	Sapporo	Zaō Onsen	Zaō Onsen	Ljubno ob Savinji	Ljubno ob Savinji	Râșnov	Râșnov	Oslo	Oberstdorf	Oberstdorf
2017–18	4	4	3	3	3	2	4	3	3	4	7	4	4	1	1
2018–19	Lillehammer	Lillehammer	Lillehammer	Prémanon	Prémanon	Sapporo	Sapporo	Zaō Onsen	Zaō Onsen	Râșnov	Râșnov	Hinzenbach	Hinzenbach	Ljubno ob Savinji	Ljubno ob Savinji	Oberstdorf	Oberstdorf	Oslo	Lillehammer	Trondheim	Nizhny Tagil	Nizhny Tagil	Chaykovsky, Perm Krai	Chaykovsky, Perm Krai
2018–19	3	DQ	11	2	3	11	8	2	6	3	7	4	2	2	1	4	3	4	14	6	9	5	3	8
2019–20	Lillehammer	Lillehammer	Klingenthal	Sapporo	Sapporo	Zaō Onsen	Zaō Onsen	Râșnov	Râșnov	Oberstdorf	Oberstdorf	Hinzenbach	Hinzenbach	Ljubno ob Savinji	Oslo	Lillehammer
2019–20	9	3	4	4	5	2	4	4	9	16	4	4	4	5	1	8
2020–21	Ramsau am Dachstein	Ljubno ob Savinji	Titisee-Neustadt	Titisee-Neustadt	Hinzenbach	Hinzenbach	Hinzenbach	Râșnov	Râșnov	Nizhny Tagil	Nizhny Tagil	Chaykovsky, Perm Krai	Chaykovsky, Perm Krai
2020–21	3	4	7	2	DQ	1	1	2	1	2	3	2	7
2021–22	Nizhny Tagil	Nizhny Tagil	Lillehammer	Lillehammer	Klingenthal	Klingenthal	Ramsau am Dachstein	Ljubno ob Savinji	Ljubno ob Savinji	Willingen	Willingen	Hinzenbach	Hinzenbach	Lillehammer	Lillehammer	Oslo	Oslo	Oberhof	Oberhof
2021–22	6	5	6	8	5	4	4	5	1	–	–	–	–	1	4	3	1	4	7
2022–23	Wisła	Wisła	Lillehammer	Lillehammer	Titisee-Neustadt	Villach	Villach	Ljubno ob Savinji	Ljubno ob Savinji	Sapporo	Sapporo	Zaō Onsen	Zaō Onsen	Hinterzarten	Hinterzarten	Willingen	Willingen	Hinzenbach	Hinzenbach	Râșnov	Râșnov	Oslo	Oslo	Lillehammer	Lillehammer	Lahti
2022–23	6	5	18	16	14	11	14	5	10	11	10	9	30	4	4	3	3	8	11	–	–	–	–	10	11	11
2023–24	Lillehammer	Lillehammer	Engelberg	Engelberg	Garmisch-Partenkirchen	Oberstdorf	Villach	Villach	Sapporo	Sapporo	Zaō Onsen	Ljubno ob Savinji	Ljubno ob Savinji	Willingen	Willingen	Hinzenbach	Hinzenbach	Lahti	Oslo	Oslo	Trondheim	Trondheim	Vikersund	Planica
2023–24	12	6	21	11	6	19	9	11	4	7	11	8	6	2	4	12	9	6	7	10	9	17	6	4
2024–25	Lillehammer	Lillehammer	Zhangjiakou	Zhangjiakou	Engelberg	Garmisch-Partenkirchen	Oberstdorf	Villach	Villach	Sapporo	Sapporo	Zaō Onsen	Zaō Onsen	Willingen	Lake Placid, New York	Lake Placid, New York	Ljubno ob Savinji	Ljubno ob Savinji	Hinzenbach	Hinzenbach	Oslo	Vikersund	Lahti	Lahti
2024–25	10	17	14	4	12	15	11	11	30	14	8	11	7	7	–	–	6	6	6	9	5	15	14	8

Olympic Games
Preceded by Ayumi Ogasawara	Flagbearer for Japan; 2018 Pyeongchang (with Noriaki Kasai)	Succeeded by Akito Watabe; Arisa Go
