= Svenja Würth =

German ski jumper

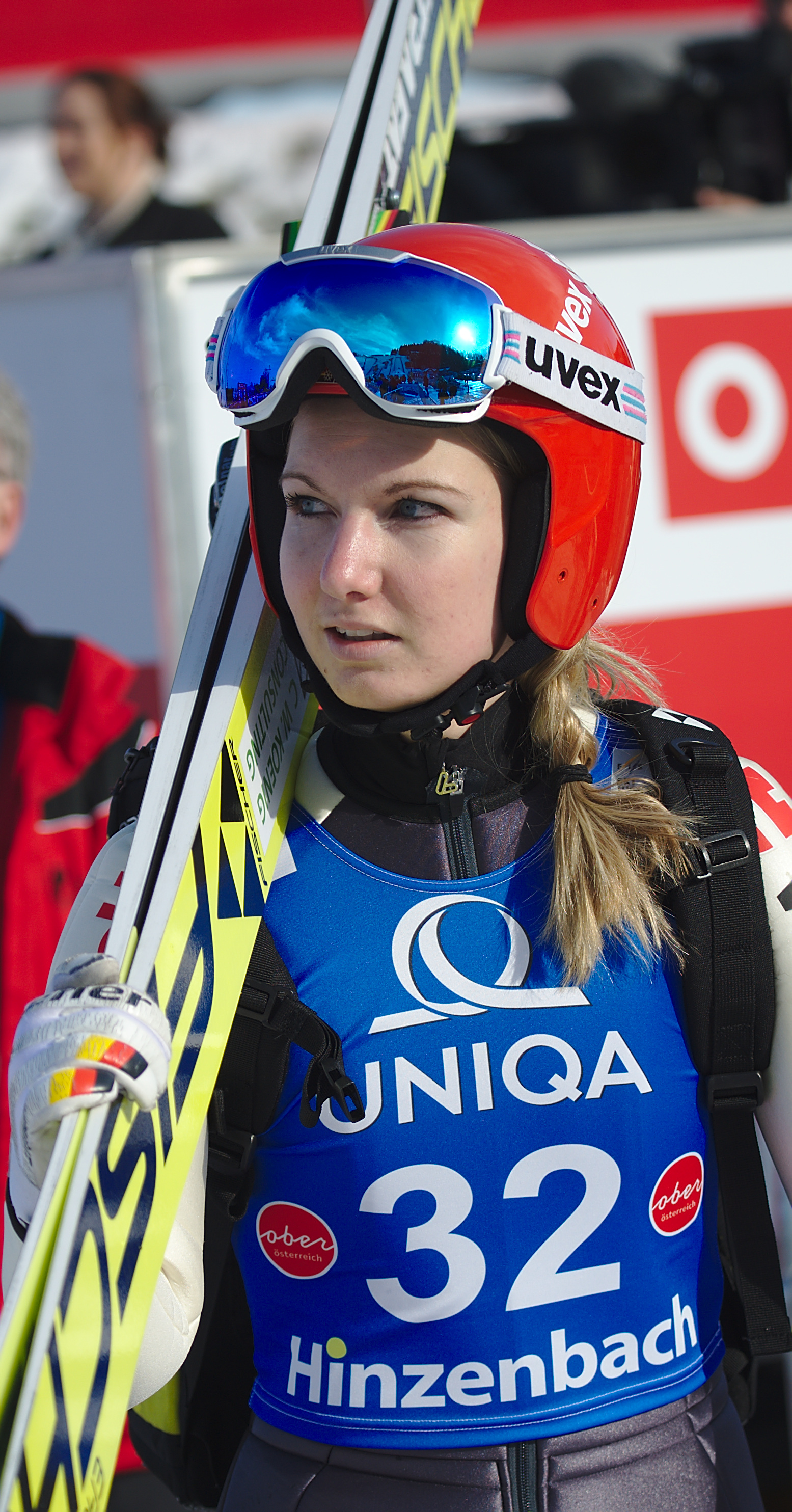
- Würth in 2017

Personal information
- Nationality: Germany
- Born: 20 August 1993 (age 33)
- Height: 1.74 m (5 ft 9 in)

Sport
- Sport: Skiing
- Club: SV Baiersbronn

World Cup career
- Seasons: 2012–present (SJ); 2020–present (NK)
- Indiv. starts: 93 (SJ); 1 (NK)
- Indiv. podiums: 1 (SJ)
Medal record
World Championships
| Gold medal – first place | 2017 Lahti | Mixed team NH |

Svenja Würth (born 20 August 1993) is a German Nordic combined skier and former ski jumper.

== Nordic combined results ==
=== World Championships ===
| Year | Normal hill | Mixed team |
|---|---|---|
| 2023 | 10 | 13 |
