= Chang Xinyue =

Chinese ski jumper (born 1994)

Chang Xinyue 常馨月
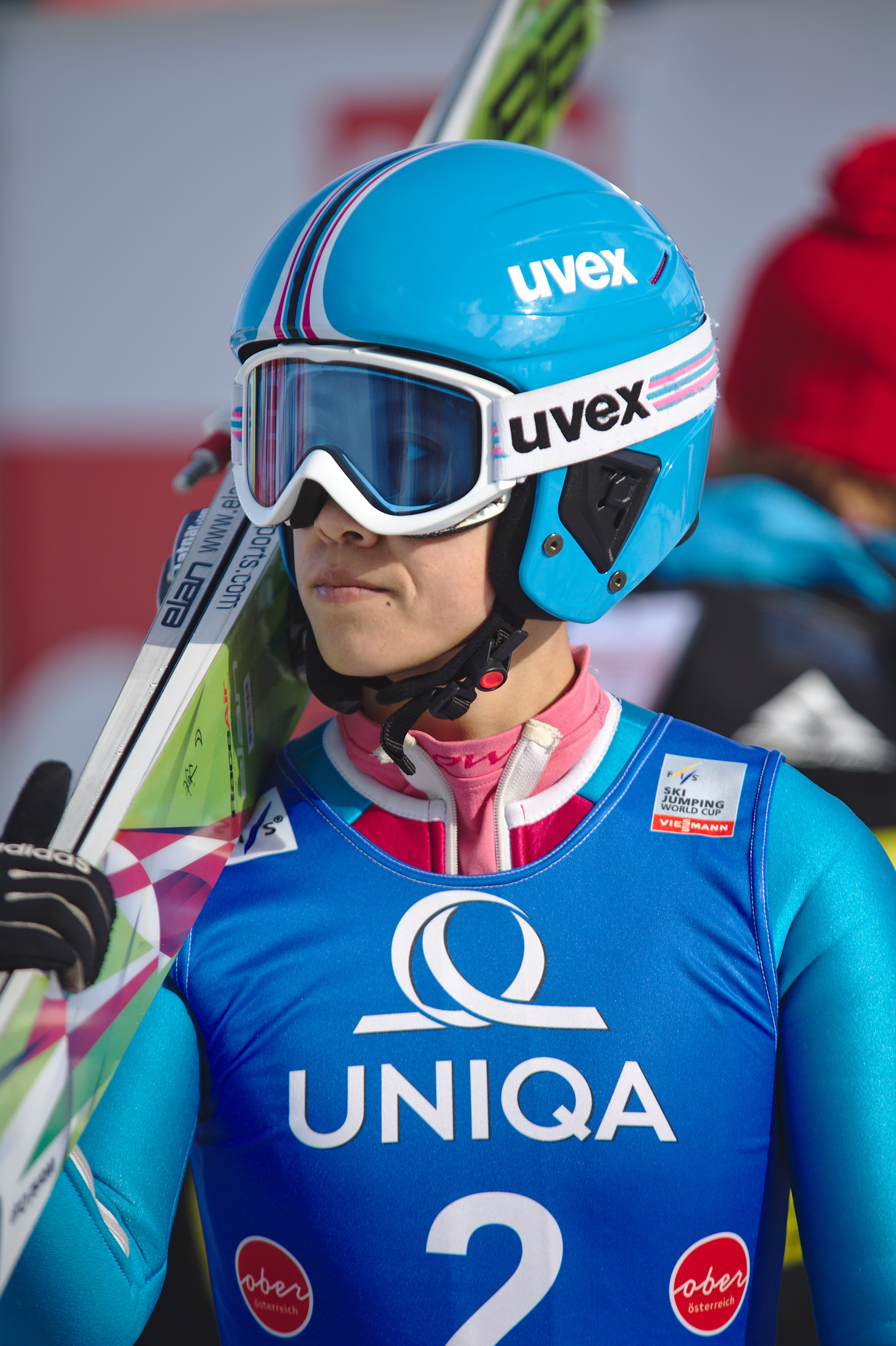

Personal information
- Nationality: China
- Born: 13 February 1994 (age 32) Tonghua, Jilin, China
- Height: 160 cm (5 ft 3 in)

Sport
- Sport: Skiing
- Club: Chinese Ski Association

World Cup career
- Seasons: 2013; 2016–present
- Indiv. starts: 16

Achievements and titles
- Personal bests: 125 m (410 ft); Lillehammer, 3 December 2017
- Updated on 25 March 2018

Chang Xinyue (Chinese: 常馨月; pinyin: Cháng Xīnyuè; Mandarin pronunciation: [ʈʂʰǎŋ ɕín ɥê]; born 13 February 1994) is a Chinese ski jumper. She is an absolute Chinese national record holder, with 125 metres (410 ft) set in Lillehammer, Norway.

== World Cup ==
=== Standings ===
Season	Overall	L3
2012/13	—	N/A
2015/16	—	N/A
2016/17	—	N/A
2017/18	26	25

=== Individual starts (16) ===
Season	1	2	3	4	5	6	7	8	9	10	11	12	13	14	15	16	17	18	19	Points
2012/13	Lillehammer	Sochi	Sochi	Ramsau am Dachstein	Schonach	Schonach	Hinterzten	Hinterzten	Sapporo	Sapporo	Zaō Onsen	Zaō Onsen	Ljubno	Ljubno	Trondheim	Oslo				0
2012/13	–	–	–	–	–	–	–	–	–	–	–	–	32	40	37	–				0
2015/16	Lillehammer	Nizhny Tagil	Nizhny Tagil	Sapporo	Sapporo	Zaō Onsen	Zaō Onsen	Oberstdorf	Oberstdorf	Oslo	Hinzenbach	Hinzenbach	Ljubno	Ljubno	Lahti	Almaty	Almaty			0
2015/16	38	q	–	–	q	q	q	q	q	q	q	q	–	–	–	–	–			0
2016/17	Lillehammer	Lillehammer	Nizhny Tagil	Nizhny Tagil	Oberstdorf	Oberstdorf	Sapporo	Sapporo	Zaō Onsen	Zaō Onsen	Râșnov	Râșnov	Hinzenbach	Hinzenbach	Ljubno	Ljubno	Pyeongchang	Pyeongchang	Oslo	0
2016/17	q	q	–	–	–	–	q	q	q	q	32	37	36	36	–	–	–			0
2017/18	Lillehammer	Lillehammer	Lillehammer	Hinterzarten	Sapporo	Sapporo	Zaō Onsen	Zaō Onsen	Ljubno	Ljubno	Râșnov	Râșnov	Oslo	Oberstdorf	Oberstdorf					99
2017/18	27	26	23	30	10	13	13	16	–	–	–	–	–	–	–					99
