= Daniela Toth =

Romanian ski jumper (born 1997)

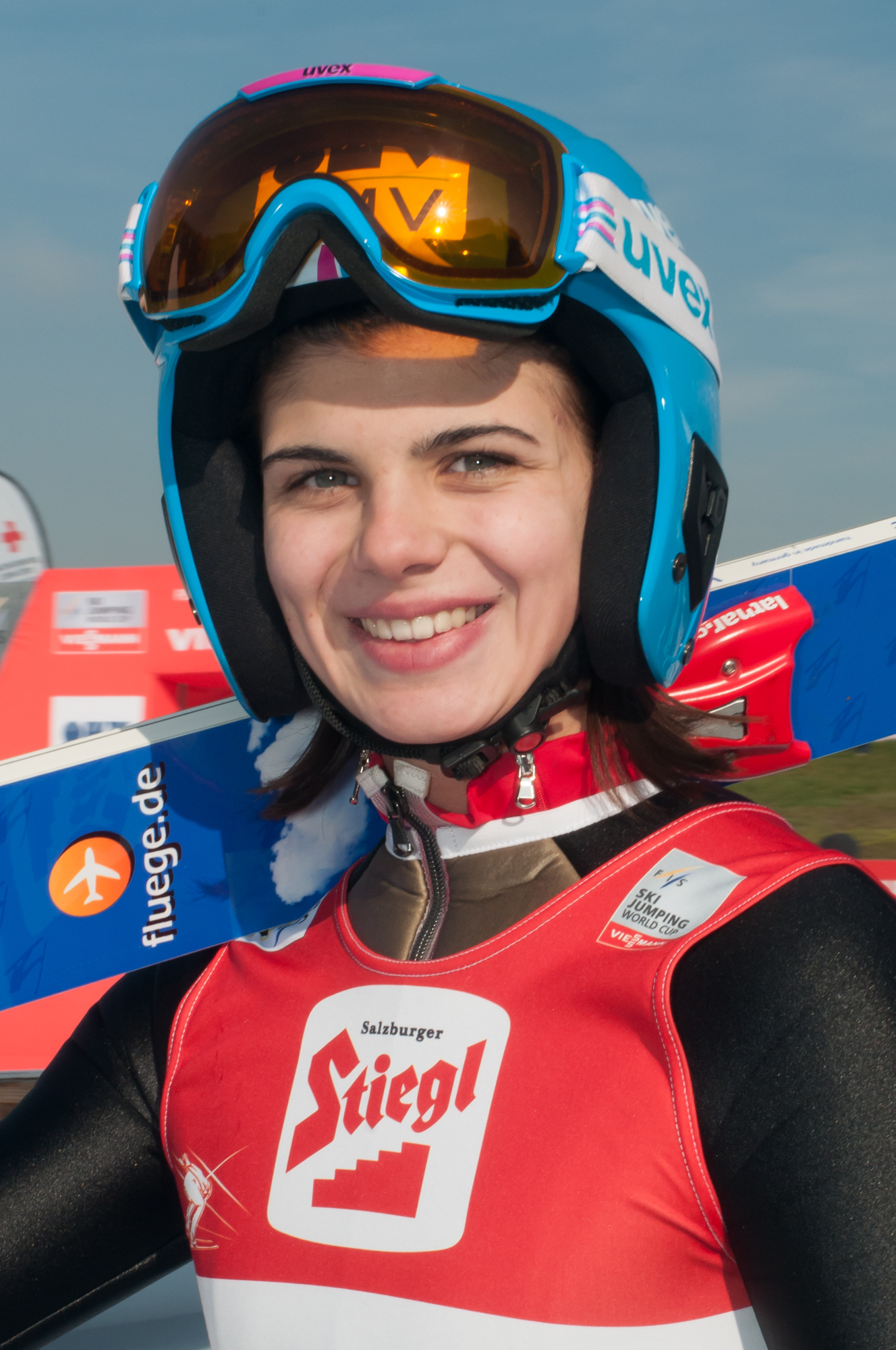
- Toth in 2015

Personal information
- Full name: Daniela Vasilica Toth
- Born: Daniela Vasilica Haralambie; 14 August 1997 (age 28) Brașov, Romania
- Height: 175 cm (5 ft 9 in)

Sport
- Sport: Skiing
- Club: ACS Săcele

Daniela "Dana" Vasilica Toth (née Haralambie, born 14 August 1997) is a Romanian ski jumper who has competed at World Cup level since the 2012/13 season.

== Career ==
Competing at the Junior World Championships in 2011, 2012, 2013, 2014, 2015, 2016 and 2017, her best placement was 4th in the normal hill at home ground in Rasnov, Romania in 2016.

Toth made her World Cup debut in November 2012 in Lillehammer. Finishing lowly for the first year, she collected her first World Cup points with 26th place in December 2013 in Hinterzarten. Mostly finishing around 25th–35th, she started the 2015–16 World Cup circuit with a 21st place in Lillehammer and stabilized around 20th–30th place. A new lifetime best was set in December 2016 in Nizhny Tagil, finishing 18th, and then one year later she ended 11th in Zao.

She made her World Championship debut in 2013, finishing lowly. Toth managed 29th place in 2017, 13th in 2019, and 26th in 2021, all in the normal hill. She finished 25th in the normal hill race at the 2018 Olympic Games.

Olympic Games
Preceded by Ionela Cozmiuc and Marius Cozmiuc	Flagbearer for Romania (with Julia Sauter); Milano Cortina 2026	Succeeded by
