= Yūka Setō =

Japanese ski jumper (born 1997)

Yūka Setō 勢藤 優花
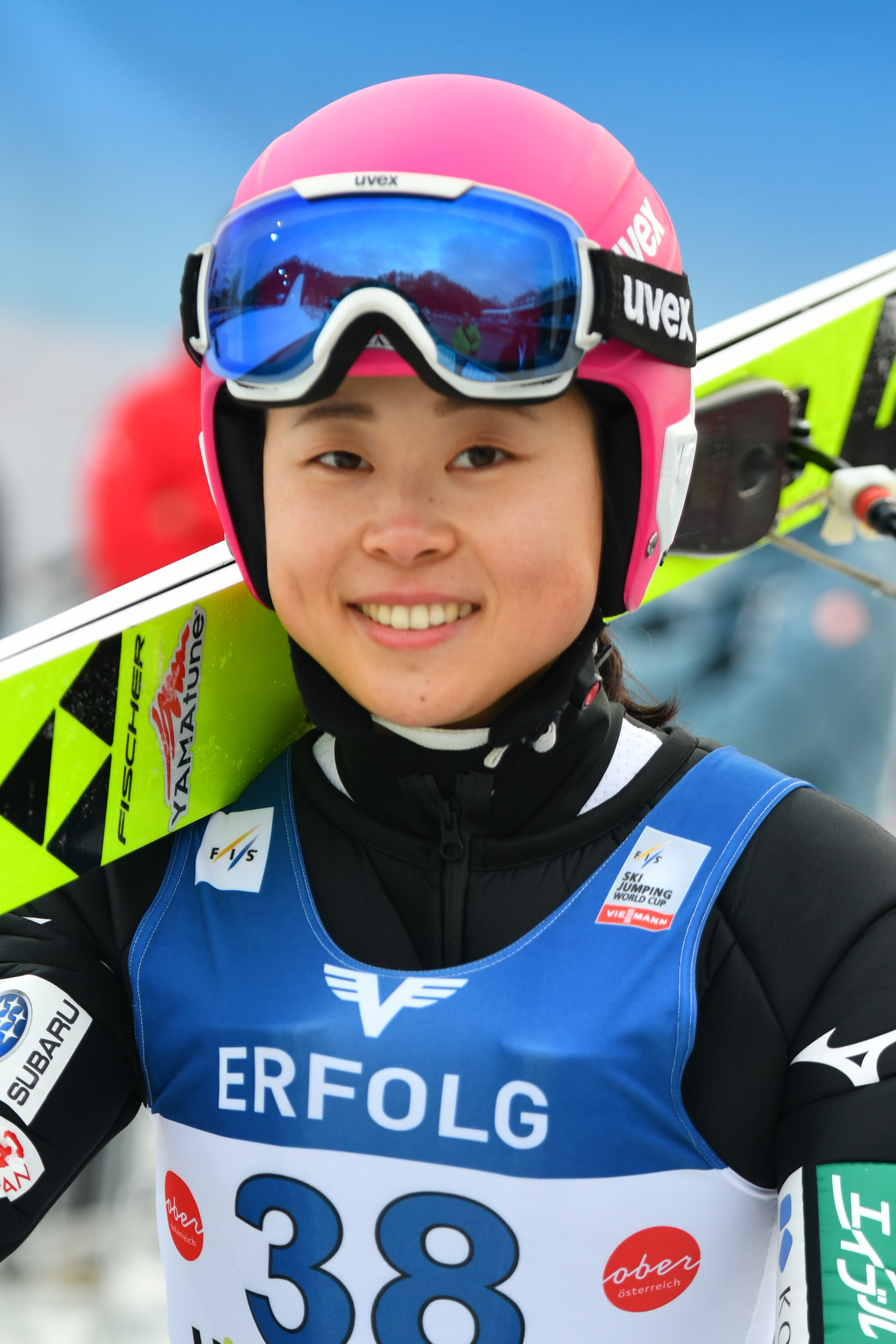
- Setō in Hinzenbach, 2023

Personal information
- Nationality: Japan
- Born: 22 February 1997 (age 29) Kamikawa, Hokkaido Prefecture, Japan
- Height: 168 cm (5 ft 6 in)

Sport
- Sport: Skiing
- Club: Hokkaido Hi-Tech AC Club

World Cup career
- Seasons: 2015–present
- Indiv. starts: 58
- Team starts: 2
- Team podiums: 2
- Team wins: 2
Medal record
Women's ski jumping
Representing Japan
Junior World Championships
Bronze medal – third place	Almaty 2015	Team NH
- Updated on 2 July 2018

Yūka Setō (勢藤 優花, Setō Yūka; born 22 February 1997) is a Japanese ski jumper. She has competed at World Cup level since the 2014/15 season, with her best individual result being fourth place in Oberstdorf on 25 March 2018. Her younger sister Rio Setō has also competed at World Cup level.

Representing the Japanese national team, Yūka won a bronze medal in the women's team competition at the 2015 Junior World Championships in Almaty. She also won the first ever women's World Cup team competition in Hinterzarten on 16 December 2017, with her team-mates Yuki Ito, Kaori Iwabuchi, and Sara Takanashi.
