= Nita Englund =

American ski jumper

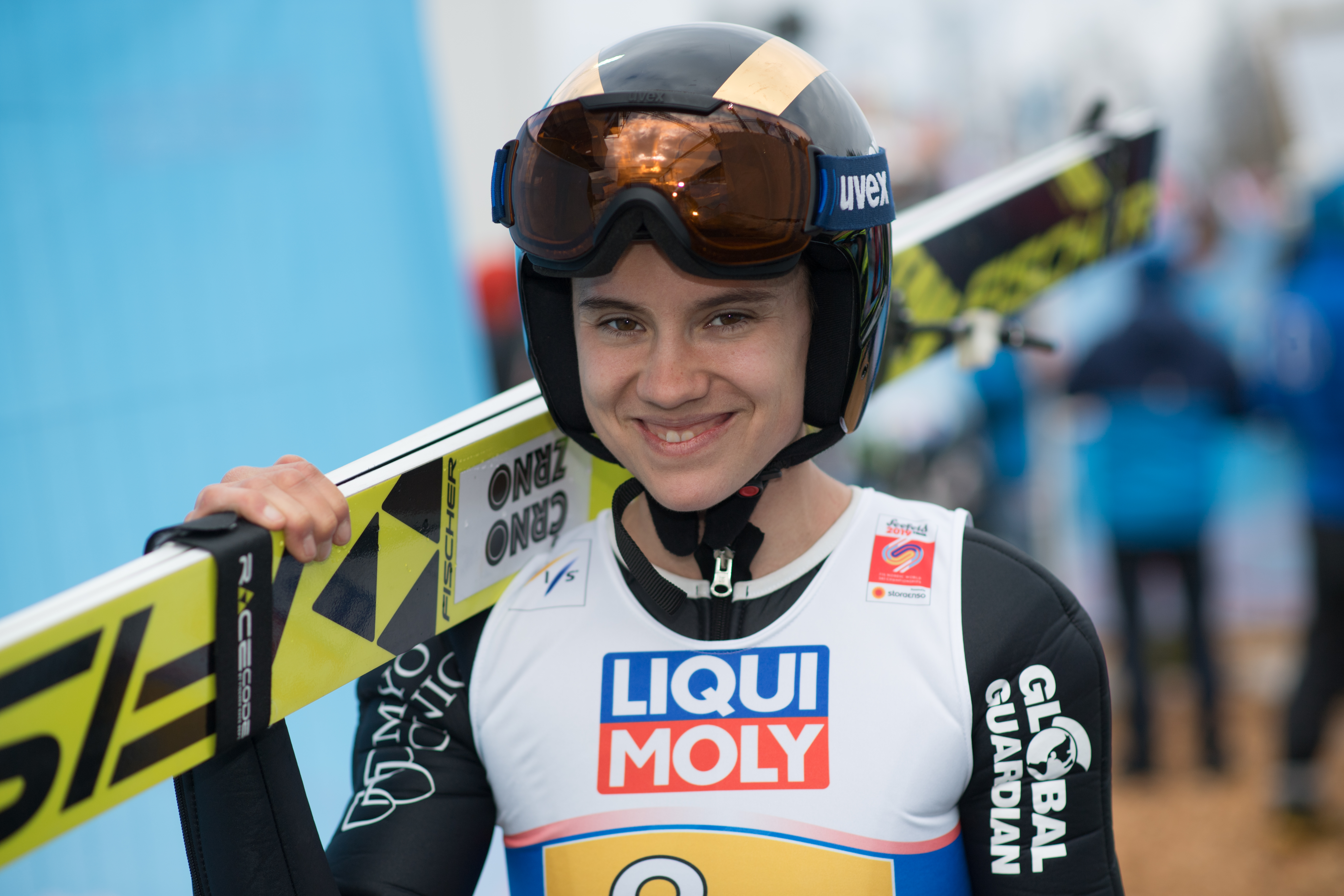
- Englund in 2019

Personal information
- Born: June 10, 1992 (age 34) Iron Mountain, Michigan, U.S.
- Height: 5 ft 7 in (170 cm)

Sport
- Sport: Skiing
- Club: Steamboat Springs Winter Sports Club

World Cup career
- Seasons: 2015 – present
- Indiv. podiums: 1
- Indiv. wins: x
- Updated on February 7, 2015

Nita Englund (born June 10, 1992 in Iron Mountain, Michigan) is an American ski jumper.

She is a member of the United States Ski Team, and participated at the 2018 Winter Olympics.

== Life ==
Englund grew up in Florence, Wisconsin. She graduated from Academy of Art University.

In 2014, she placed third at the FIS Cup in Frenštát pod Radhoštěm.
