= Kaori Iwabuchi =

Japanese ski jumper (born 1993)

Kaori Iwabuchi 岩渕 香里
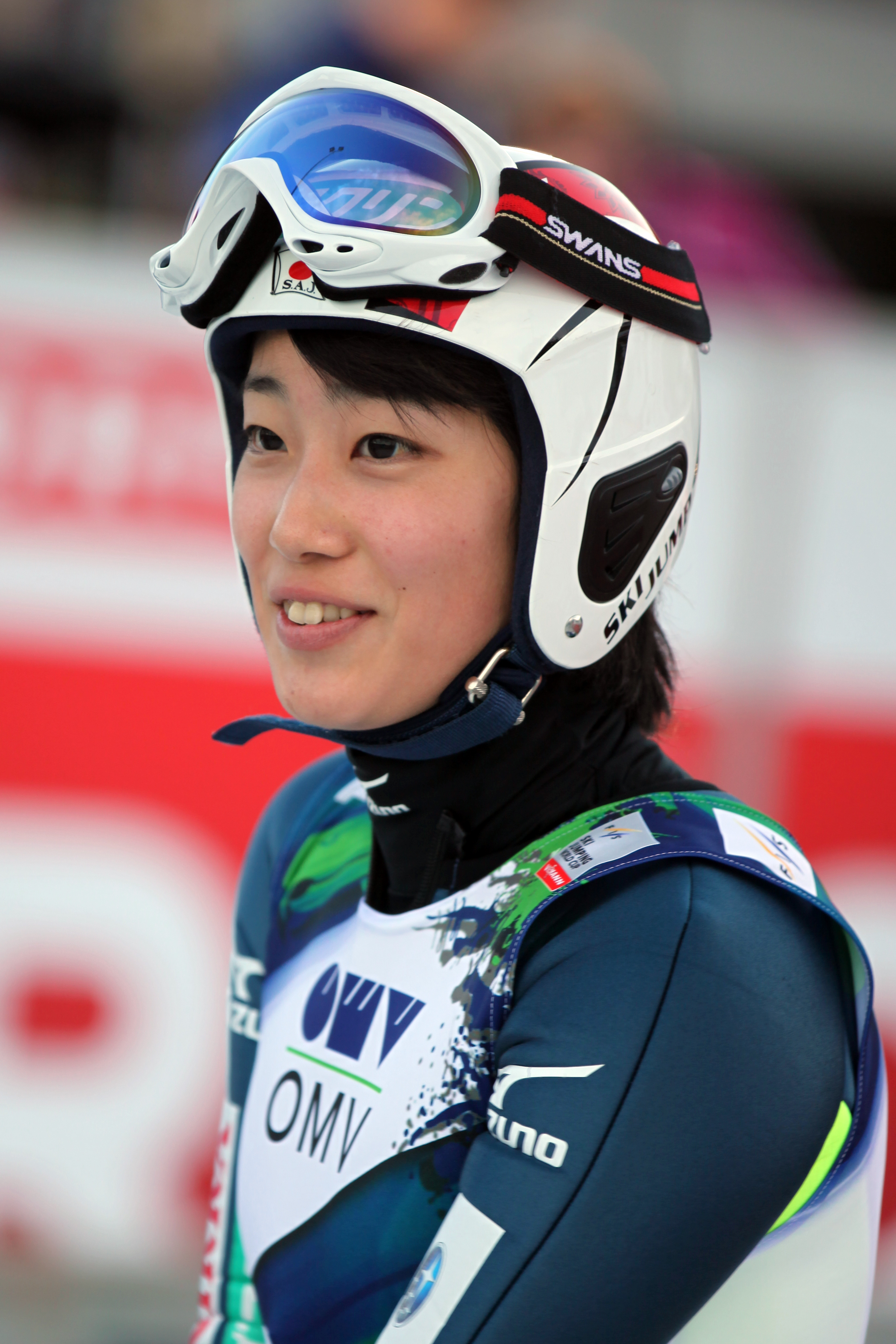
- Iwabuchi in Hinzenbach, 2014

Personal information
- Nationality: Japan
- Born: 28 April 1993 (age 33) Ueda, Nagano Prefecture, Japan

Sport
- Sport: Skiing
- Club: Kitano Construction Corp.

World Cup career
- Seasons: 2012–2022
- Indiv. starts: 144
- Team starts: 2
- Team podiums: 2
- Team wins: 2
Medal record
Women's ski jumping
Junior World Championships
Gold medal – first place	Erzurum 2012	Team NH
- Updated on 12 February 2024

Kaori Iwabuchi (岩渕 香里, Iwabuchi Kaori; born 28 April 1993) is a Japanese ski jumper. She has competed at World Cup level since the 2011/12 season, with her best individual result being sixth place in Lahti on 19 February 2016.

Representing the Japanese national team, she won a gold medal in the women's team competition at the 2012 Junior World Championships in Erzurum. She also won the first ever women's World Cup team competition in Hinterzarten on 16 December 2017, with her team-mates Yuki Ito, Yūka Setō, and Sara Takanashi.
