= Taylor Henrich =

Canadian ski jumper (born 1995)

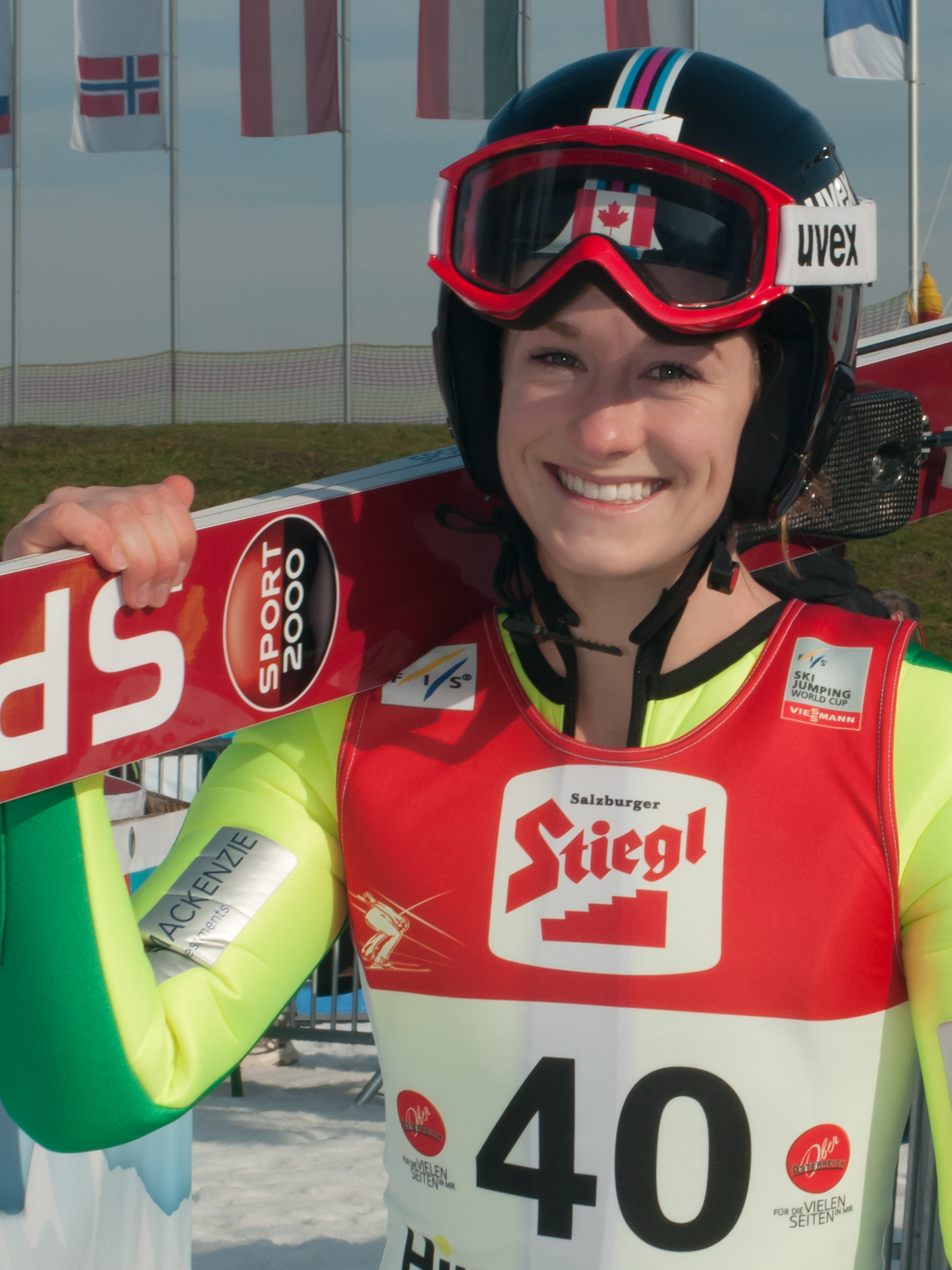
- Henrich in 2015

Personal information
- Born: 1 November 1995 (age 30) Calgary, Alberta, Canada
- Height: 1.62 m (5 ft 4 in)

Sport
- Sport: Skiing
- Club: Altius Nordic Ski Club

World Cup career
- Seasons: 2012 – present
- Indiv. podiums: 2

Achievements and titles
- Personal best: 5 place finish World Championships Falun Sweden
- Updated on 13 March 2015

Taylor Henrich (born 1 November 1995) is a Canadian ski jumper.

Born in Calgary, Alberta, Henrich began the sport at age seven. Henrich competed for Canada at the 2014 Winter Olympics in the premier of Ski jumping at the 2014 Winter Olympics – Women's normal hill individual and her ranking in 2013/2014 was 23rd. She reached her first World Cup podium with a 3rd place in Oberstdorf Germany on 25 January 2015. This is also the first ever Ladies World Cup podium for Canada. Henrich is still active in the Nordic sport world and is in pursuit of representing Canada for a third time in Women's Nordic combined at the 2022 Winter Olympics.

== Career ==
=== 2014 Winter Olympics ===
Henrich was named to debut in the Historical Olympic event on 26 January 2014.

=== 2018 Winter Olympics ===
Henrich was named to her second Olympic team on 24 January 2018.
