= Špela Rogelj =

Slovenian ski jumper (born 1994)

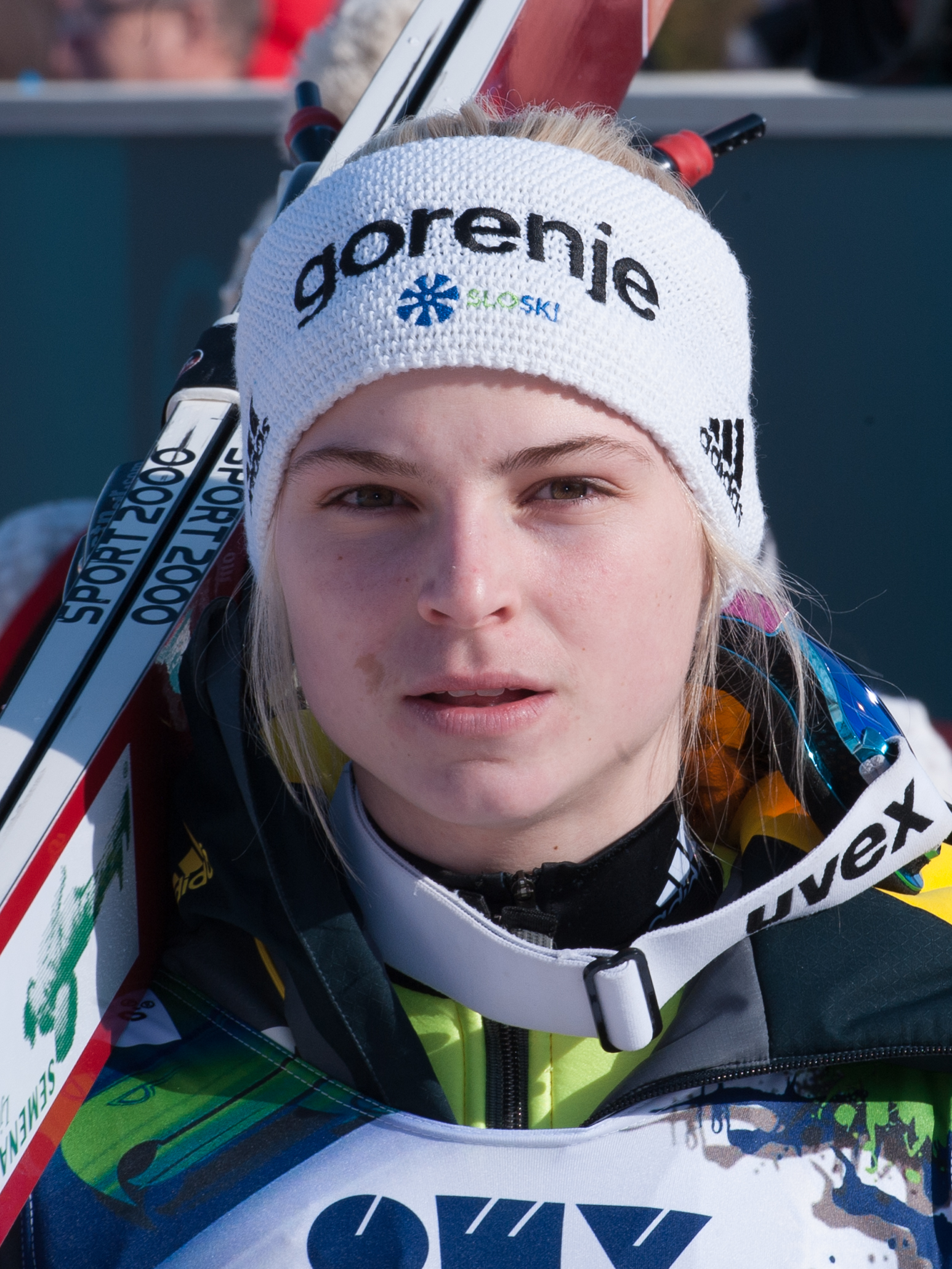
- Rogelj in 2015

Personal information
- Born: 8 November 1994 (age 31) Ljubljana, Slovenia
- Height: 1.64 m (5 ft 5 in)

Sport
- Sport: Ski jumping

World Cup career
- Seasons: 2012–2022
- Indiv. starts: 171
- Indiv. podiums: 5
- Indiv. wins: 1
- Team starts: 9
- Team podiums: 6
- Team wins: 1
Medal record
World Championships
Silver medal – second place	2021 Oberstdorf	Team NH

Špela Rogelj (born 8 November 1994) is a retired Slovenian ski jumper.

== Career ==
=== Early years ===
Rogelj began her ski jumping career at the age of thirteen, competing in Dobbiaco on 23 January 2008. This took place at Continental Cup level. She later competed in the 2009 Ski Jumping World Championships in Liberec, finishing 30th. Two years later she finished second in the Junior World Championships in Otepää on 27 January 2011, beaten only by Coline Mattel. Her best result in the Continental Cup is second place, achieved on 29 November 2011 in Rovaniemi.

=== World Cup career ===
At World Cup level she won her first individual event in Lillehammer on 5 December 2014, which gave her the lead of the women's standings until the following event in Sapporo on 11 January 2015. As the season progressed, she was unable to maintain her early form and finished fourth overall in the 2014–15 women's World Cup; it was nonetheless her highest ever ranking in the World Cup.

== World Cup record ==
=== Overall standings ===
Season	Position	Points
2011–12	17	165
2012–13	11	387
2013–14	20	221
2014–15	4	581
2015–16	10	415
2016–17	17	271
2017–18	19	175
2018–19	21	228
2019–20	22	150
2020–21	19	179
2021–22	12	371

=== Individual wins ===
No.	Season	Date	Location	Hill	Size
1	2014–15	5 December 2014	(Norway) Lillehammer	Lysgårdsbakken HS100	NH
