= Léa Lemare =

French ski jumper (born 1996)

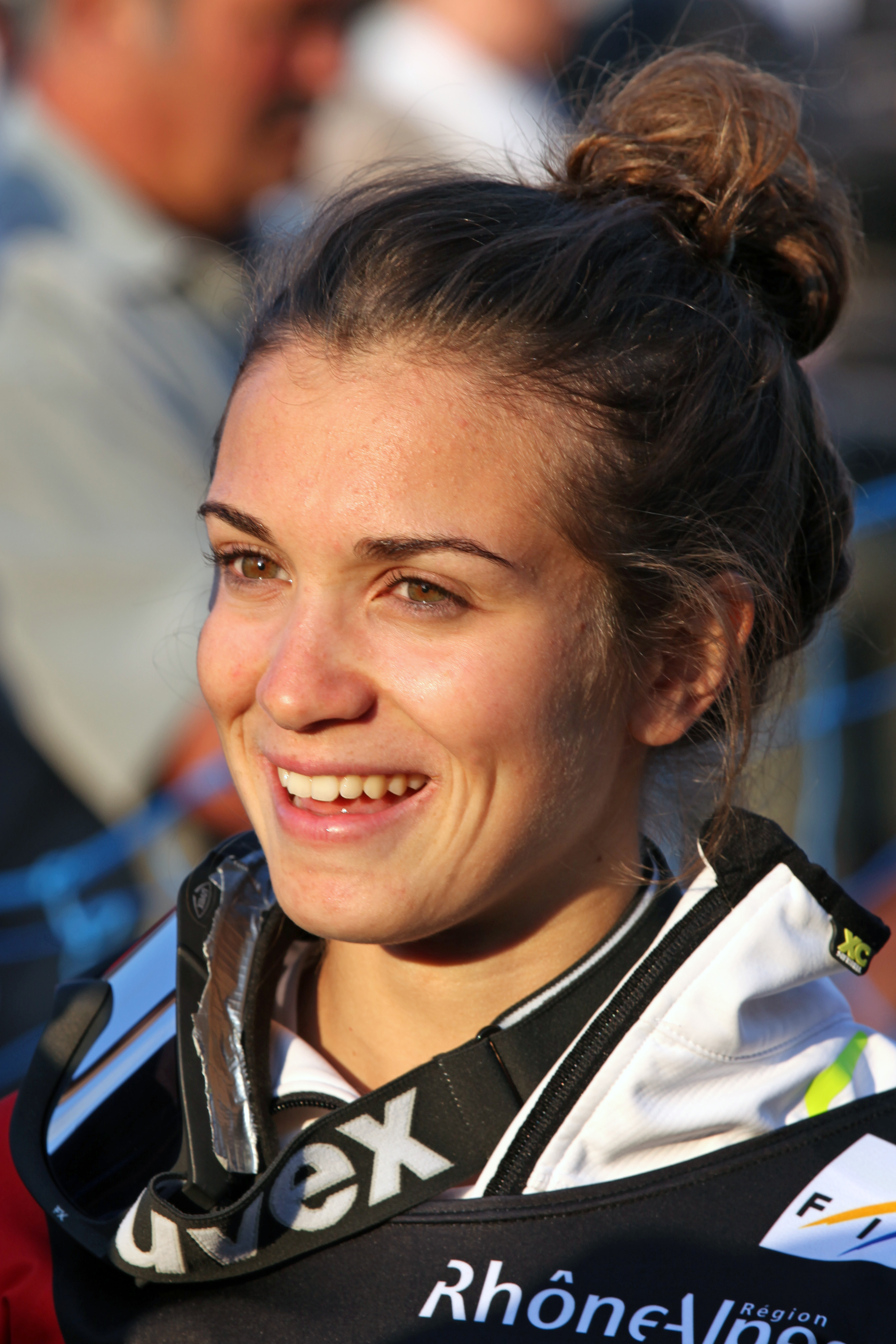
- Lemare in 2013
- Born: 21 June 1996 (age 28); Albertville, France
- Height: 169 cm (5 ft 7 in)
- Ski club: Club des Sports de Courchevel

Léa Lemare (born 21 June 1996 in Albertville, France), is a French ski jumper and the 2013 National Champion.

Lemare started ski jumping at the age of seven. From 2011 on she has represented France in the World Cup. In Lillehammer (3 December 2011), her first World Cup event, she placed 36th. In 2012, Lemare represented France at the Youth Olympic Winter Games in Innsbruck and placed 4th in the individual ranking and 9th in the team ranking. In 2013, Lemare achieved her best World Cup result, placing 1st in Ljubno (16 February 2013), and at World Championships in Val di Fiemme (22 and 24 February 2013) Lemare placed 5th in the team ranking and 38th in the individual ranking.

On the 2013 Summer Grand Prix circuit, Lemare achieved several top ten positions. In Hinterzarten (26 and 27 July 2013) she placed 9th in the individual and 5th in the team ranking. In Courchevel (14 and 15 August 2013) Lemare won the mixed team bronze medal and placed 20th in the individual ranking.
