= Julia Kykkänen =

Finnish ski jumper (born 1994)

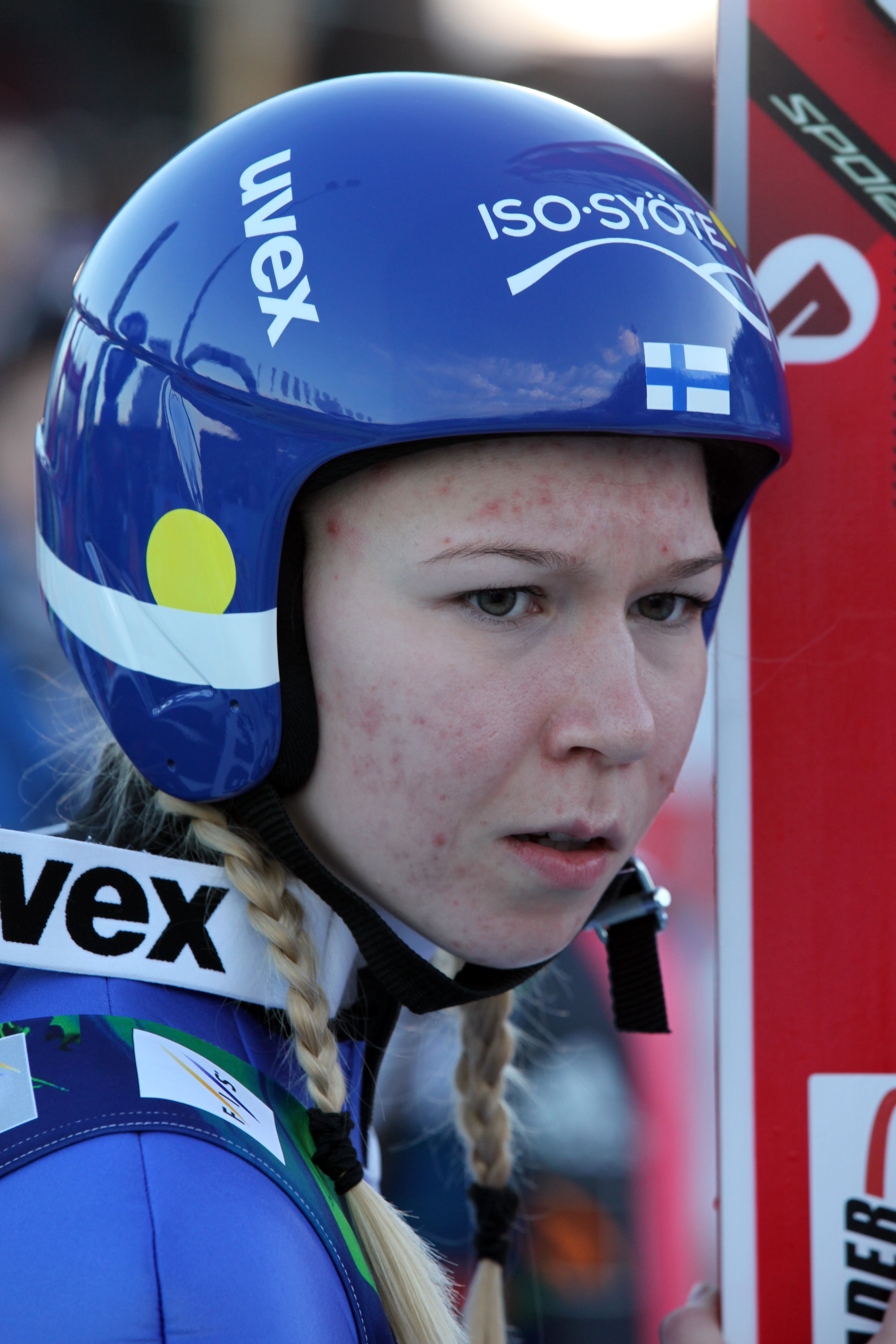
- Kykkänen in Hinzenbach, 2014

Personal information
- Full name: Julia Kykkänen
- Nationality: Finland
- Born: 17 April 1994 (age 32) Lahti, Finland

Sport
- Sport: Skiing
- Club: Lahden Hiihtoseura

World Cup career
- Seasons: 2011–present
- Indiv. podiums: 2
- Updated on 27 May 2015

Julia Kykkänen (born 17 April 1994) is a Finnish ski jumper who has competed since 2010. She was the first Finnish female ski jumper to compete in the Ski Jumping World Championships, during the 2009 event in Liberec. At World Cup level her best finish is third on two occasions, in Hinzenbach on 2 February 2014 and in Falun on 15 March 2014, as well as eight additional top-10 finishes.

== Standings ==
=== Junior World Championships ===
- 32. in Zakopane, Poland, 2008
- 22. in Strbske Pleso, Slovakia, 2009
- 23. in Hinterzarten, Germany, 2010
- 17. in Otepää, Estonia, 2011
- 8. in Erzurum, Turkey, 2012

=== World Championships ===
- 26. in Liberec, Czech Republic, 2009
- 17. in Oslo, Norway, 2011
- 10 in Predazzo, Italy, 2013

=== Ski jumping Continental Cup ===
- 46. in Bischofsgün, Germany, August 12, 2007
- 36. in Pöhla Germany, August 15, 2007
- 45. in Bischofshofen, Austria, August 18, 2007
- 44. in Ramsau, Austria, August 19, 2007
- 27. in Notodden, Norway, December 11, 2007
- 17. in Notodden, Norway, December 12, 2007
- 17. in Zao, Japan, March 8, 2008
- 21. in Zao, Japan, March 9, 2008
- 3. in Lillehammer, Norway, September 8, 2009

=== Ski jumping World Cup ===
- 14. in Lillehammer, Norway, December 3, 2011
- 15. in Predazzo, Italy, January 14, 2012
- 15. in Hinzenbach, Austria, February 5, 2012
