= 2016–17 FIS Cup (ski jumping) =

FIS Cup 2016/17
Discipline	Men	Women
Overall	(Poland) Paweł Wąsek	(Romania) Daniela Haralambie

Competition
Edition	12th	5th
Locations	10	6
Individual	20	11

The 2016/17 FIS Cup (ski jumping) was the 12th FIS Cup season in ski jumping for men and the 5th for ladies.

Other competitive circuits this season included the World Cup, Grand Prix, Continental Cup, FIS Race and Alpen Cup.

== Calendar ==
=== Men ===
Season	Date	Place	Hill	Size	Winner	Second	Third	Yellow bib	Ref.
1	2 July 2016	(Austria) Villach	Villacher Alpenarena HS98	NH	(Japan) Yūken Iwasa	(Austria) Thomas Diethart	(Germany) Jonathan Siegel	(Japan) Yūken Iwasa	
2	3 July 2016	(Austria) Villach	Villacher Alpenarena HS98	NH	(Italy) Sebastian Colloredo	(Austria) Thomas Diethart	(Austria) Stefan Huber	(Austria) Thomas Diethart	
3	9 July 2016	(Poland) Szczyrk	Skalite HS106	NH	(Italy) Davide Bresadola	(Italy) Sebastian Colloredo	(Austria) Janni Reisenauer	(Italy) Sebastian Colloredo	
4	10 July 2016	(Poland) Szczyrk	Skalite HS106	NH	(Italy) Davide Bresadola	(Poland) Krzysztof Miętus	(Austria) Janni Reisenauer	(Italy) Davide Bresadola	
5	18 August 2016	(Finland) Kuopio	Puijo HS127	LH	(Poland) Jan Ziobro	(Austria) Daniel Huber	(Norway) Jarl Magnus Riiber	(Italy) Davide Bresadola	
6	19 August 2016	(Finland) Kuopio	Puijo HS127	LH	(Poland) Jan Ziobro	(Italy) Davide Bresadola	(Poland) Aleksander Zniszczoł	(Italy) Davide Bresadola	
7	3 September 2016	(Switzerland) Einsiedeln	Andreas Küttel Schanze HS117	LH	(Slovenia) Aljaž Osterc	(Poland) Dominik Kastelik (Poland) Paweł Wąsek		(Italy) Davide Bresadola	
8	4 September 2016	(Switzerland) Einsiedeln	Andreas Küttel Schanze HS117	LH	(Slovenia) Aljaž Osterc	(Germany) Felix Hoffmann	(Poland) Dominik Kastelik	(Italy) Davide Bresadola	
9	17 September 2016	(Germany) Hinterzarten	Rothaus-Schanze HS108	NH	(Slovenia) Aljaž Osterc	(Germany) Julian Hahn	(Poland) Paweł Wąsek	(Italy) Davide Bresadola	
10	18 September 2016	(Germany) Hinterzarten	Rothaus-Schanze HS108	NH	(Japan) Yūken Iwasa	(Austria) Stefan Huber	(Slovenia) Aljaž Osterc	(Slovenia) Aljaž Osterc	
11	1 October 2016	(Romania) Râșnov	Trambulina Valea Cărbunării HS100	NH	(Austria) Stefan Huber	(Poland) Paweł Wąsek	(Germany) Felix Hoffmann	(Slovenia) Aljaž Osterc	
12	2 October 2016	(Romania) Râșnov	Trambulina Valea Cărbunării HS100	NH	(Poland) Paweł Wąsek	(Germany) Julian Hahn	(Germany) Felix Hoffmann	(Austria) Stefan Huber	
13	15 December 2016	(Norway) Notodden	Tveitanbakken HS100	NH	(Austria) Maximilian Steiner	(Germany) Sebastian Bradatsch	(Norway) Joacim Ødegård Bjøreng	(Austria) Stefan Huber	
14	16 December 2016	(Norway) Notodden	Tveitanbakken HS100	NH	(Austria) Maximilian Steiner	(Norway) Joacim Ødegård Bjøreng	(Germany) Sebastian Bradatsch	(Poland) Paweł Wąsek	
15	7 January 2017	(Poland) Zakopane	Wielka Krokiew HS134	LH	(Austria) Ulrich Wohlgenannt	(Switzerland) Killian Peier	(Poland) Andrzej Stękała	(Poland) Paweł Wąsek	
16	8 January 2017	(Poland) Zakopane	Wielka Krokiew HS134	LH	(Austria) Ulrich Wohlgenannt	(Slovenia) Matjaž Pungertar	(Slovenia) Timi Zajc	(Poland) Paweł Wąsek	
17	27 January 2017	(United States) Eau Claire	Silver Mine Hill HS95	NH	(Germany) Moritz Baer	(Italy) Alex Insam	(Austria) Thomas Lackner	(Poland) Paweł Wąsek	
18	28 January 2017	(United States) Eau Claire	Silver Mine Hill HS95	NH	(Finland) Eetu Nousiainen	(Austria) Thomas Lackner	(Germany) Moritz Baer	(Poland) Paweł Wąsek	
19	4 March 2017	(Japan) Sapporo	Miyanomori HS100	NH	(Japan) Yūken Iwasa	(Germany) Pius Paschke	(Slovenia) Aljaž Osterc	(Poland) Paweł Wąsek	
20	5 March 2017	(Japan) Sapporo	Ōkurayama HS137	LH	(Germany) Pius Paschke	(Germany) Moritz Baer	(Japan) Shinya Komaba	(Poland) Paweł Wąsek	

=== Ladies ===
Season	Date	Place	Hill	Size	Winner	Second	Third	Yellow bib	Ref.
1	2 July 2016	(Austria) Villach	Villacher Alpenarena HS98	NH	(Slovenia) Eva Logar	(Slovenia) Špela Rogelj	(Poland) Kinga Rajda	(Slovenia) Eva Logar	
2	3 July 2016	(Austria) Villach	Villacher Alpenarena HS98	NH	(Slovenia) Eva Logar	(Slovenia) Špela Rogelj (Slovenia) Urša Bogataj		(Slovenia) Eva Logar	
3	9 July 2016	(Poland) Szczyrk	Skalite HS106	NH	(Poland) Kinga Rajda	(Germany) Henriette Kraus	(Canada) Natasha Bodnarchuk	(Slovenia) Eva Logar	
4	10 July 2016	(Poland) Szczyrk	Skalite HS106	NH	(Poland) Kinga Rajda	(Germany) Henriette Kraus	(Canada) Natasha Bodnarchuk	(Poland) Kinga Rajda	
5	3 September 2016	(Switzerland) Einsiedeln	Simon Ammann Schanze HS77	MH	(Germany) Selina Freitag	(Romania) Daniela Haralambie	(Japan) Fumika Segawa	(Poland) Kinga Rajda	
6	4 September 2016	(Switzerland) Einsiedeln	Simon Ammann Schanze HS77	NH	(Romania) Daniela Haralambie	(Germany) Selina Freitag	(Romania) Andreea Diana Trâmbițaș	(Poland) Kinga Rajda	
7	17 September 2016	(Germany) Hinterzarten	Rothaus-Schanze HS108	NH	(Germany) Carina Vogt	(Germany) Anna Rupprecht	(Romania) Daniela Haralambie	(Poland) Kinga Rajda	
8	18 September 2016	(Germany) Hinterzarten	Rothaus-Schanze HS108	NH	(Germany) Anna Rupprecht	(Germany) Katharina Althaus	(Germany) Svenja Würth	(Poland) Kinga Rajda	
9	1 October 2016	(Romania) Râșnov	Trambulina Valea Cărbunării HS100	NH	(Romania) Daniela Haralambie	(Russia) Alexandra Barantceva	(Austria) Sophie Maier	(Romania) Daniela Haralambie	
10	2 October 2016	(Romania) Râșnov	Trambulina Valea Cărbunării HS100	NH	(Romania) Daniela Haralambie	(Russia) Alexandra Barantceva	(Austria) Sophie Maier	(Romania) Daniela Haralambie	
11	15 December 2016	(Norway) Notodden	Tveitanbakken HS100	NH	(Germany) Luisa Görlich	(Germany) Pauline Heßler	(France) Joséphine Pagnier	(Romania) Daniela Haralambie	
12	27 January 2017	(United States) Eau Claire	Silver Mine Hill HS95	NH	(Japan) Fumika Segawa	(Japan) Minami Watanabe	(Japan) Nozomi Maruyama	(Romania) Daniela Haralambie	
13	28 January 2017	(United States) Eau Claire	Silver Mine Hill HS95	NH	(Japan) Rio Seto	(Japan) Fumika Segawa	(Japan) Nozomi Maruyama	(Romania) Daniela Haralambie	

== Overall standings ==
=== Men ===
Rank	after all 20 events	Points
1	(Poland) Paweł Wąsek	542
2	(Japan) Juken Iwasa	529
3	(Slovenia) Aljaž Osterc	472
4	(Austria) Stefan Huber	430
5	(Italy) Davide Bresadola	365

=== Ladies ===
Rank	after all 13 events	Points
1	(Romania) Daniela Haralambie	485
2	(Poland) Kinga Rajda	334
3	(Romania) Andreea Diana Trâmbițaș	279
4	(Germany) Henriette Kraus	232
5	(Russia) Alexandra Barantceva	216
