= Justin Lisso =

German ski jumper

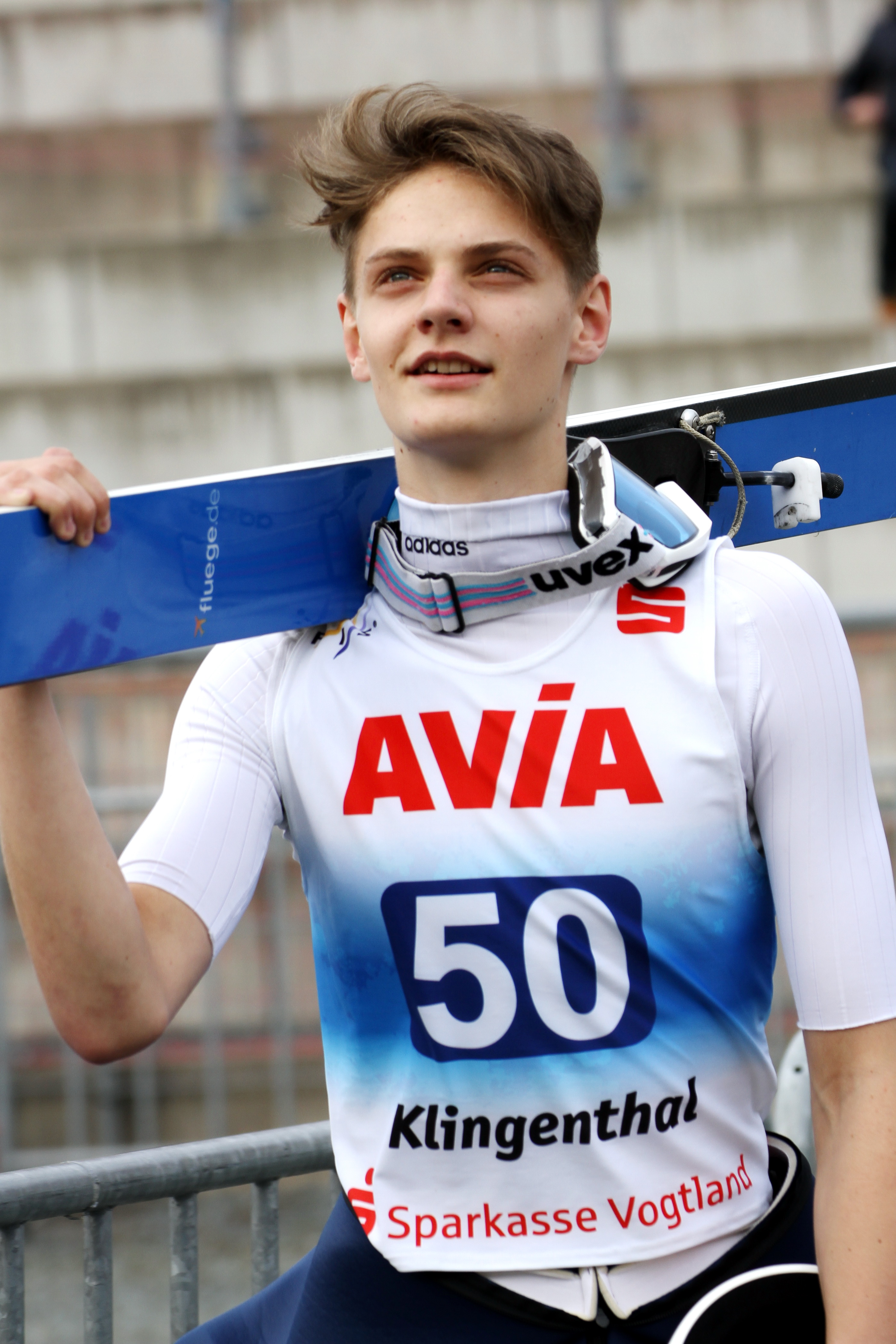

Personal information
- Nationality: Germany
- Born: 12 December 1999 (age 26)
- Height: 1.82 m (6 ft 0 in)

Sport
- Sport: Skiing
- Club: WSV Schmiedefeld

World Cup career
- Seasons: 2022–present
- Indiv. starts: 11

Achievements and titles
- Personal bests: 207.5 m (681 ft); Bad Mitterndorf, 27 January 2023
Medal record
Men's ski jumping
Representing Germany
Junior World Championships
Gold medal – first place	2018 Kandersteg	Team NH
Silver medal – second place	2018 Kandersteg	Mixed Team NH
- Updated on 5 April 2023

Justin Lisso (born 12 December 1999) is a German ski jumper and representative of the club WSV Schmiedefeld am Rennsteig e.V. (Thuringia). He competes at World Cup level from the 2018–19 season on.

== Career ==
Lisso started his international career in 2015 in the Alpen Cup at Hinterzarten. Later he competed in the FIS Cup, and for the first time in 2017 he started in the tier-two Continental Cup.

At the 2018 Nordic Junior World Ski Championships in Kandersteg he became gold medal winner in the men's team competition together with Constantin Schmid, Philipp Raimund, and Cedric Weigel, and silver medallist in the mixed competition in a team with Luisa Görlich, Gianina Ernst, and Constantin Schmid. He finished in 20th place in the men's individual event.

In the 2021–22 season, Lisso for the first time qualified for a World Cup competition during the Four Hills Tournament in Garmisch-Partenkirchen. He scored his first points in the World Cup taking the 11th place in a competition in Titisee-Neustadt. In the 2022–23 World Cup season, he finished 28th in the Raw Air 2023 tournament in Norway, showing the best individual result with a 13th place at Holmenkollen in Oslo.

== World Cup ==
=== Standings ===
Season	Overall	4H	SF	RA	P7
2021/22	48	60	N/A	N/A	N/A
2022/23	40	N/A	N/A	28	N/A

=== Individual starts ===
winner (1); second (2); third (3); did not compete (–); failed to qualify (q); disqualified (DQ)
Season	1	2	3	4	5	6	7	8	9	10	11	12	13	14	15	16	17	18	19	20	21	22	23	24	25	26	27	28	29	30	31	32	Points
2018/19	Wisła	Kuusamo	Kuusamo	Nizhny Tagil	Nizhny Tagil	Engelberg	Engelberg	Oberstdorf	Garmisch-Partenkirchen	Innsbruck	Bischofshofen	Val di Fiemme	Val di Fiemme	Zakopane	Sapporo	Sapporo	Oberstdorf	Oberstdorf	Oberstdorf	Lahti	Willingen	Willingen	Oslo	Lillehammer	Trondheim	Vikersund	Planica	Planica					0
2018/19	–	–	–	–	–	–	–	q	q	–	–	–	–	–	–	–	–	–	–	–	–	–	–	–	–	–	–	–					0
2021/22	Nizhny Tagil	Nizhny Tagil	Ruka	Ruka	Wisła	Klingenthal	Klingenthal	Engelberg	Engelberg	Oberstdorf	Garmisch-Partenkirchen	Bischofshofen	Bischofshofen	Bischofshofen	Zakopane	Titisee-Neustadt	Titisee-Neustadt	Willingen	Willingen	Lahti	Lahti	Lillehammer	Oslo	Oslo	Oberstdorf	Oberstdorf	Planica	Planica					44
2021/22	–	–	–	–	–	–	–	–	–	–	43	–	–	–	–	11	13	–	–	–	–	–	–	–	q	–	–	–					44
2022/23	Wisła	Wisła	Kuusamo	Kuusamo	Titisee-Neustadt	Titisee-Neustadt	Engelberg	Engelberg	Oberstdorf	Garmisch-Partenkirchen	Innsbruck	Bischofshofen	Zakopane	Sapporo	Sapporo	Sapporo	Tauplitz	Tauplitz	Willingen	Willingen	Lake Placid	Lake Placid	Râșnov	Oslo	Oslo	Lillehammer	Lillehammer	Vikersund	Vikersund	Lahti	Planica	Planica	60
2022/23	–	–	–	–	–	–	–	–	–	–	–	–	–	–	–	–	q	q	34	–	–	–	–	39	13	20	18	33	35	15	–	–	60
