= 2016–17 FIS Ski Jumping Alpen Cup =

Alpen Cup 2016/17
Discipline	Men	Women
Overall	(Slovenia) Žiga Jelar	(Germany) Selina Freitag
Alpen Cup Tournament	—	(Hungary) Virág Vörös

Competition
Edition	27th	9th
Locations	6	8
Individual	12	16

The 2016/17 FIS Ski Jumping Alpen Cup was the 27th Alpen Cup season in ski jumping for men and the 9th for ladies.

Other competitive circuits this season included the World Cup, Grand Prix, Continental Cup, FIS Cup and FIS Race.

== Calendar ==
=== Men ===
Season	Date	Place	Hill	Size	Winner	Second	Third	Ref.
1	10 September 2016	(Switzerland) Einsiedeln	Andreas Küttel Schanze HS117	LH	(Germany) Felix Hoffmann	(Germany) Luca Roth	(Germany) Julian Hahn	
2	11 September 2016	(Switzerland) Einsiedeln	Andreas Küttel Schanze HS117	LH	(Slovenia) Aljaž Osterc	(Germany) Felix Hoffmann	(Germany) Julian Hahn	
3	30 September 2016	(Germany) Hinterzarten	Rothaus-Schanze HS108	NH	(Slovenia) Bor Pavlovčič	(Slovenia) Timi Zajc	(Slovenia) Žiga Jelar	
4	1 October 2016	(Germany) Hinterzarten	Rothaus-Schanze HS108	NH	(Austria) Maximilian Schmalnauer	(Slovenia) Bor Pavlovčič	(Austria) Markus Rupitsch	
5	17 December 2016	(Austria) Seefeld	Toni-Seelos-Olympiaschanze HS109	NH	(Germany) Johannes Schubert	(Slovenia) Rok Tarman	(Slovenia) Aljaž Osterc	
6	18 December 2016	(Austria) Seefeld	Toni-Seelos-Olympiaschanze HS109	NH	(Slovenia) Aljaž Osterc (Slovenia) Žiga Jelar (Slovenia) Tine Bogataj			
7	13 January 2017	(Germany) Schonach	Langenwaldschanze HS106	NH	(Slovenia) Rok Tarman	(Austria) Philipp Haagen	(Austria) Markus Rupitsch	
8	14 January 2017	(Germany) Schonach	Langenwaldschanze HS106	NH	(Slovenia) Žiga Jelar	(Slovenia) Timi Zajc	(Slovenia) Rok Tarman	
9	25 February 2017	(Slovenia) Kranj	Bauhenk HS109	NH	(Slovenia) Tilen Bartol	(Slovenia) Tine Bogataj	(Slovenia) Matevž Samec	
10	26 February 2017	(Slovenia) Kranj	Bauhenk HS109	NH	(Slovenia) Blaž Pavlič	(Austria) Maximilian Lienher	(Austria) Janni Reisenauer	
11	10 March 2016	(France) Chaux-Neuve	La Côté Feuillée HS118	LH	(Slovenia) Žiga Jelar	(Austria) Clemens Leitner	(Germany) Moritz Bär	
12	11 March 2017	(France) Chaux-Neuve	La Côté Feuillée HS118	LH	(Germany) Moritz Bär	(Austria) Clemens Leitner	(Slovenia) Timi Zajc	

=== Ladies ===
Season	Date	Place	Hill	Size	Winner	Second	Third	Ref.
1	7 August 2016	(Germany) Klingenthal	Vogtlandschanzen HS65	MH	(Hungary) Virág Vörös	(Germany) Selina Freitag	(Austria) Timna Moser	
2	8 August 2016	(Germany) Klingenthal	Vogtlandschanzen HS65	MH	(Hungary) Virág Vörös	(Germany) Selina Freitag	(Czech Republic) Jana Mrakotova	
3	10 August 2016	(Germany) Pöhla	Pöhlbachschanze HS66	MH	(Hungary) Virág Vörös	(Austria) Lisa Eder	(Germany) Selina Freitag	
4	11 August 2016	(Germany) Pöhla	Pöhlbachschanze HS66	MH	(Austria) Lisa Eder	(Germany) Selina Freitag	(France) Oceane Pailard	
5	12 August 2016	(Germany) Bischofsgrün	Ochsenkopfschanze HS71	MH	(Austria) Lisa Eder	(Germany) Selina Freitag	(Germany) Arantxa Lancho	
6	13 August 2016	(Germany) Bischofsgrün	Ochsenkopfschanze HS71	MH	(Hungary) Virág Vörös	(Germany) Arantxa Lancho	(Austria) Lisa Eder	
1st Alpen Cup Tournament Overall (7–13 August 2016)					(Hungary) Virág Vörös	(Austria) Lisa Eder	(Germany) Selina Freitag	
7	10 September 2016	(Switzerland) Einsiedeln	Simon Ammann Schanze HS77	MH	(Slovenia) Kaja Urbanija Čož	(Austria) Sophie Mair	(Slovenia) Jerneja Brecl	
8	11 September 2016	(Switzerland) Einsiedeln	Simon Ammann Schanze HS77	MH	(Slovenia) Jerneja Brecl	(Germany) Selina Freitag	(Austria) Sophie Mair	
9	16 December 2016	(Germany) Rastbüchl	Baptist Kitzlinger Schanze HS78	MH	(Slovenia) Katra Komar	(Austria) Lisa Eder	(Slovenia) Jerneja Brecl (Slovenia) Kaja Urbanija Čož	
10	17 December 2016	(Germany) Rastbüchl	Baptist Kitzlinger Schanze HS78	MH	(Slovenia) Jerneja Brecl	(Slovenia) Kaja Urbanija Čož	(Germany) Selina Freitag	
11	13 January 2017	(Germany) Schonach	Langenwaldschanze HS106	NH	(France) Josephine Pagnier	(France) Romane Dieu	(Italy) Lara Malsiner	
12	14 January 2017	(Germany) Schonach	Langenwaldschanze HS106	NH	(Slovenia) Jerneja Brecl	(Italy) Lara Malsiner	(France) Josephine Pagnier	
13	21 January 2017	(Slovenia) Žiri	Nordijski center Račeva HS66	MH	(Slovenia) Katra Komar	(Slovenia) Jerneja Brecl	(France) Romane Dieu	
14	22 January 2017	(Slovenia) Žiri	Nordijski center Račeva HS66	MH	(Slovenia) Katra Komar	(Slovenia) Jerneja Brecl	(France) Romane Dieu	
15	11 March 2016	(France) Chaux-Neuve	La Côté Feuillée HS60	MH	(Slovenia) Katra Komar	(France) Josephine Pagnier	(France) Océane Avocat Gros	
16	12 March 2017	(France) Chaux-Neuve	La Côté Feuillée HS60	MH	(Germany) Selina Freitag	(Slovenia) Katra Komar	(France) Océane Avocat Gros	

== Standings ==
=== Men ===
Rank	after 12 events	Points
1	(Slovenia) Žiga Jelar	639
2	(Slovenia) Timi Zajc	438
3	(Austria) Markus Rupitsch	408
4	(Slovenia) Rok Tarman	367
5	(Germany) Moritz Bär	362

=== Ladies ===
Rank	after 16 events	Points
1	(Germany) Selina Freitag	883
2	(Slovenia) Jerneja Brecl	744
3	(Slovenia) Katra Komar	671
4	(Austria) Lisa Eder	595
5	(France) Romane Dieu	505

=== Ladies' Alpen Cup Tournament ===
Rank	after 6 events	Points
1	(Hungary) Virág Vörös	1338.6
2	(Austria) Lisa Eder	1315.4
3	(Germany) Selina Freitag	1283.1
4	(Germany) Arantxa Lancho	1272.9
5	(Czech Republic) Jana Mrakotova	1266.1
