= 2016–17 FIS Ski Jumping Continental Cup =

Ski-jumping competition series

FIS Ski Jumping Continental Cup 2016/17
| Discipline | Men | Women |
| Summer | (Germany) Markus Eisenbichler | (France) Lucile Morat |
| Winter | (Austria) Clemens Aigner | (France) Joséphine Pagnier |

Competition
| Edition | 15th (Summer), 26th (Winter) | 9th (Summer), 13th (Winter) |
| Locations | 7 (Summer), 15 (Winter) | 2 (Summer), 1 (Winter) |
| Individual | 14 (Summer), 30 (Winter) | 3 (Summer), 2 (Winter) |
| Cancelled | — (Summer), — (Winter) | 1 (Summer), — (Winter) |
| Rescheduled | — (Summer), 7 (Winter) | — (Summer), — (Winter) |

The 2016/17 FIS Ski Jumping Continental Cup was the 26th in a row (24th official) Continental Cup winter season and the 14th official summer season in ski jumping for men. This was one of the busiest men's season in Continental Cup history with 14 summer and 30 winter individual events. Markus Eisenbichler won winter overall and Clemens Aigner won summer overall season.

This was also the 13th winter and the 9th summer season for women. French women dominated this season as Lucile Morat won summer overall and Joséphine Pagnier won winter overall.

Other competitive circuits this season included also the World Cup, Grand Prix, FIS Cup, FIS Race and Alpen Cup.

== Map of continental cup hosts ==
All 23 continental cup hosts in summer (7 men's / 2 women's) and in winter (15 men's / 1 women's) this season.

Europe
| Germany | Austria United States | Asia |

== Men's Summer ==
Individual men's events in the CC history

| Total | F | L | N | Winners |
|---|---|---|---|---|
| 171 | — | 94 | 77 |

after large hill event in Klingenthal (1 October 2016)

=== Calendar ===
| All | No. | Date | Place (Hill) | Size | Winner | Second | Third | Overall leader | R. |
|---|---|---|---|---|---|---|---|---|---|
| 158 | 1 | 1 July 2016 | (Slovenia) Kranj (Bauhenk HS109) | N _{074} | (Slovenia) Peter Prevc | (Slovenia) Rok Justin | (Austria) Clemens Aigner | (Slovenia) Peter Prevc | |
| 159 | 2 | 2 July 2016 | (Slovenia) Kranj (Bauhenk HS109) | N _{075} | (Slovenia) Peter Prevc | (Slovenia) Robert Kranjec | (Slovenia) Jaka Hvala | (Slovenia) Peter Prevc | |
| 160 | 3 | 20 August 2016 | (Finland) Kuopio (Puijo HS127) | L _{085} | (Finland) Jarkko Määttä | (Austria) Maximilian Steiner | (Japan) Yūken Iwasa | (Slovenia) Peter Prevc | |
| 161 | 4 | 21 August 2016 | (Finland) Kuopio (Puijo HS127) | L _{086} | (Norway) Jarl Magnus Riiber | (Italy) Alex Insam | (Poland) Krzysztof Miętus | (Slovenia) Peter Prevc | |
| 162 | 5 | 26 August 2016 | (Czech Republic) Frenštát (Areal Horečky HS106) | N _{076} | (Czech Republic) Lukas Hlava | (Italy) S. Colloredo | (Poland) A. Zniszczoł | (Slovenia) Peter Prevc | |
| 163 | 6 | 27 August 2016 | (Czech Republic) Frenštát (Areal Horečky HS106) | N _{077} | (Poland) A. Zniszczoł | (Czech Republic) Lukas Hlava | (Poland) Bartłomiej Kłusek | (Poland) A. Zniszczoł | |
| 164 | 7 | 10 September 2016 | (Norway) Lillehammer (Lysgårdsbakken HS138) | L _{087} | (Norway) J. Ødegård Bjøreng | (Norway) H. Egner Granerud | (Norway) Robert Johansson | (Poland) A. Zniszczoł | |
| 165 | 8 | 11 September 2016 | (Norway) Lillehammer (Lysgårdsbakken HS138) | L _{088} | (Germany) M. Eisenbichler | (Slovenia) Tilen Bartol | (Norway) H. Egner Granerud | (Poland) A. Zniszczoł | |
| 166 | 9 | 17 September 2016 | (Austria) Stams (Brunnentalschanze HS115) | L _{089} | (Germany) M. Eisenbichler | (Austria) Clemens Aigner | (Canada) M. Boyd-Clowes | (Germany) M. Eisenbichler | |
| 167 | 10 | 18 September 2016 | (Austria) Stams (Brunnentalschanze HS115) | L _{090} | (Germany) M. Eisenbichler | (Austria) Stefan Kraft | (Slovenia) Rok Justin | (Germany) M. Eisenbichler | |
| 168 | 11 | 24 September 2016 | (Poland) Wisła (Malinka HS134) | L _{091} | (Italy) Davide Bresadola | (Slovenia) Domen Prevc | (Poland) Jan Ziobro | (Germany) M. Eisenbichler | |
| 169 | 12 | 25 September 2016 | (Poland) Wisła (Malinka HS134) | L _{092} | (Germany) M. Eisenbichler | (Austria) Daniel Huber | (Italy) Alex Insam | (Germany) M. Eisenbichler | |
| 170 | 13 | 30 September 2016 | (Germany) Klingenthal (Vogtland Arena HS140) | L _{093} | (Germany) M. Eisenbichler | (Germany) Stephan Leyhe | (Poland) Jan Ziobro | (Germany) M. Eisenbichler | |
| 171 | 14 | 1 October 2016 | (Germany) Klingenthal (Vogtland Arena HS140) | L _{094} | (Slovenia) Jurij Tepeš | (Norway) J. Ødegård Bjøreng | (Poland) Jan Ziobro | (Germany) M. Eisenbichler | |
| 15th FIS Summer Continental Cup Men's Overall (1 July – 1 October 2016) | | | | | (Germany) M. Eisenbichler | (Poland) Jan Ziobro | (Slovenia) Rok Justin | Summer Overall | |

==== Overall ====
| Rank | after 14 events | Points |
|---|---|---|
| 1 | (Germany) Markus Eisenbichler | 618 |
| 2 | (Poland) Jan Ziobro | 438 |
| 3 | (Slovenia) Rok Justin | 430 |
| 4 | (Italy) Davide Bresadola | 353 |
| 5 | (Poland) Aleksander Zniszczoł | 337 |
| 6 | (Italy) Sebastian Colloredo | 325 |
| 7 | (Norway) Joacim Ødegård Bjøreng | 321 |
| 8 | (Italy) Alex Insam | 305 |
| 9 | (Norway) Halvor Egner Granerud | 291 |
| 10 | (Slovenia) Tilen Bartol | 280 |

== Men's Winter ==
Individual men's events in the CC history

| Total | F | L | N | Winners |
|---|---|---|---|---|
| 856 | 4 | 452 | 400 |

after normal hill event in Chaykovsky (19 March 2017)

=== Calendar ===
| All | No. | Date | Place (Hill) | Size | Winner | Second | Third | Overall leader | R. |
|---|---|---|---|---|---|---|---|---|---|
| | | 9 December 2016 | (Norway) Lillehammer (Lysgårdsbakken HS138) | L _{cnx} | rescheduled to Vikersund on the same dates (due to World Cup replacement conflict in Lillehammer) | | | — | |
| | | 10 December 2016 | (Norway) Lillehammer (Lysgårdsbakken HS138) | L _{cnx} | rescheduled to Vikersund on the same dates (due to World Cup replacement conflict in Lillehammer) | | | — | |
| | | 11 December 2016 | (Norway) Lillehammer (Lysgårdsbakken HS138) | L _{cnx} | rescheduled to Vikersund on the same dates (due to World Cup replacement conflict in Lillehammer) | | | — | |
| 827 | 1 | (Note: Originally men's large hill event in Lillehammer (9 December) was cancelled due to World Cup schedule conflict and moved to Vikersund (same date).)9 December 2016 | (Norway) Vikersund (Vikersundbakken HS117) | L _{427} | (Slovenia) Cene Prevc | (Norway) Tom Hilde | (Poland) Jan Ziobro | (Slovenia) Cene Prevc | |
| 828 | 2 | (Note: Originally men's large hill event in Lillehammer (10 December) was cancelled due to World Cup schedule conflict and moved to Vikersund (same date).)10 December 2016 | (Norway) Vikersund (Vikersundbakken HS117) | L _{428} | (Slovenia) Cene Prevc | (Slovenia) Rok Justin | (Austria) Daniel Huber | (Slovenia) Cene Prevc | |
| 829 | 3 | (Note: Originally men's large hill event in Lillehammer (11 December) was cancelled due to World Cup schedule conflict and moved to Vikersund (same date).)11 December 2016 | (Norway) Vikersund (Vikersundbakken HS117) | L _{429} | (Slovenia) Anže Semenič | (Slovenia) Cene Prevc | (Norway) Tom Hilde | (Slovenia) Cene Prevc | |
| 830 | 4 | (Note: Men's large hill competition in Ruka (17 December) had only one round due to bad weather.)17 December 2016 | (Finland) Ruka (Rukatunturi HS142) | L _{430} | (Austria) Ulrich Wohlgenannt | (Austria) Florian Altenburger | (Italy) S. Colloredo | (Slovenia) Cene Prevc | |
| 831 | 5 | 18 December 2016 | (Finland) Ruka (Rukatunturi HS142) | L _{431} | (Austria) Elias Tollinger | (Austria) Stefan Huber | (Austria) Philipp Aschenwald | (Slovenia) Cene Prevc | |
| 832 | 6 | 27 December 2016 | (Switzerland) Engelberg (Gross-Titlis-Schanze HS140) | L _{432} | (Norway) H. Egner Granerud | (Norway) Joakim Aune | (Slovenia) Aljaž Osterc | (Slovenia) Cene Prevc | |
| 833 | 7 | 28 December 2016 | (Switzerland) Engelberg (Gross-Titlis-Schanze HS140) | L _{433} | (Austria) Daniel Huber | (Slovenia) Aljaž Osterc | (Norway) Joakim Aune | (Slovenia) Cene Prevc | |
| 834 | 8 | 7 January 2017 | (Germany) Titisee-Neustadt (Hochfirstschanze HS142) | L _{434} | (Norway) J. André Forfang | (Austria) Daniel Huber | (Poland) Klemens Murańka | (Austria) Daniel Huber | |
| 835 | 9 | 8 January 2017 | (Germany) Titisee-Neustadt (Hochfirstschanze HS142) | L _{435} | (Czech Republic) Viktor Polášek | (Norway) J. André Forfang | (Austria) Clemenes Aigner | (Austria) Daniel Huber | |
| 836 | 10 | 14 January 2017 | (Germany) Garmisch-Pa (Gr. Olympiaschanze HS140) | L _{436} | (Slovenia) Anže Lanišek | (Austria) Florian Altenburger | (Slovenia) Miran Zupančič | (Austria) Daniel Huber | |
| 837 | 11 | 15 January 2017 | (Germany) Garmisch-Pa (Gr. Olympiaschanze HS140) | L _{437} | (Slovenia) Miran Zupančič | (Slovenia) Anže Lanišek | (Norway) Nymoen Soeberg | (Austria) Daniel Huber | |
| 838 | 12 | 20 January 2017 | (Japan) Sapporo (Okurayama HS100) (Okurayama HS137) | N _{397} | (Slovenia) Miran Zupančič | (Germany) Andreas Wank | (Slovenia) Anže Lanišek | (Slovenia) Miran Zupančič | |
| 839 | 13 | 21 January 2017 | (Japan) Sapporo (Okurayama HS100) (Okurayama HS137) | L _{438} | (Austria) Clemens Aigner | (Slovenia) Anže Lanišek | (Poland) A. Zniszczoł | (Slovenia) Miran Zupančič | |
| 840 | 14 | 22 January 2017 | (Japan) Sapporo (Okurayama HS100) (Okurayama HS137) | L _{439} | (Germany) Andreas Wank | (Slovenia) Nejc Dežman | (Slovenia) Miran Zupančič | (Slovenia) Miran Zupančič | |
| 841 | 15 | 28 January 2017 | (Austria) Bischofshofen (Paul-Ausserleitner HS140) | L _{440} | (Austria) Clemens Aigner | (Czech Republic) Tomáš Vančura | (Switzerland) Simon Ammann | (Slovenia) Miran Zupančič | |
| 842 | 16 | 29 January 2017 | (Austria) Bischofshofen (Paul-Ausserleitner HS140) | L _{441} | (Czech Republic) Tomáš Vančura | (Switzerland) Simon Ammann | (Austria) Clemens Aigner | (Austria) Clemens Aigner | |
| 843 | 17 | 4 February 2017 | (Turkey) Erzurum (Kiremitliktepe HS140 / 109) | L _{442} | (Slovenia) Nejc Dežman | (Slovenia) Jaka Hvala | (Italy) S. Colloredo | (Slovenia) Miran Zupančič | |
| | | 5 February 2017 | (Turkey) Erzurum (Kiremitliktepe HS140 / 109) | L _{cnx} | moved from large HS140 hill to normal HS109 hill | | | — | |
| 844 | 18 | (Note: Originally scheduled men's large HS140 hill event in Erzurum (5 February) was rescheduled to normal HS109 hill event.)5 February 2017 | (Turkey) Erzurum (Kiremitliktepe HS140 / 109) | N _{398} | (Slovenia) Nejc Dežman | (Slovenia) Jaka Hvala | (Slovenia) Rok Justin | (Slovenia) Miran Zupančič | |
| 845 | 19 | 11 February 2017 | (Germany) Brotterode (Inselbergschanze HS117) | L _{443} | (Slovenia) Nejc Dežman | (Slovenia) Miran Zupančič | (Norway) Joakim Aune | (Slovenia) Miran Zupančič | |
| 846 | 20 | 12 February 2017 | (Germany) Brotterode (Inselbergschanze HS117) | L _{444} | (Germany) Felix Hoffmann | (Slovenia) Nejc Dežman | (Austria) Daniel Huber | (Slovenia) Nejc Dežman | |
| 847 | 21 | 18 February 2017 | (Slovenia) Planica (Bloudkova velikanka HS139) | L _{445} | (Slovenia) Bor Pavlovčič | (Norway) Joakim Aune | (Czech Republic) Viktor Polášek | (Slovenia) Nejc Dežman | |
| 848 | 22 | 19 February 2017 | (Slovenia) Planica (Bloudkova velikanka HS139) | L _{446} | (Slovenia) Tilen Bartol | (Slovenia) Bor Pavlovčič | (Germany) Constantin Schmid | (Slovenia) Nejc Dežman | |
| | | 25 February 2017 | (United States) Iron Mountain (Pine Mountain HS133) | L _{cnx} | cancelled due to strong wind and rescheduled on next day | | | — | |
| 849 | 23 | (Note: Men's large hill cancelled competition in Iron Mountain (25 February) was rescheduled on 26 February (first event of the day).)26 February 2017 | (United States) Iron Mountain (Pine Mountain HS133) | L _{447} | (Austria) Stefan Huber | (Poland) Klemens Murańka | (Austria) Clemens Aigner | (Slovenia) Nejc Dežman | |
| 850 | 24 | 26 February 2017 | (United States) Iron Mountain (Pine Mountain HS133) | L _{448} | (Norway) H. Egner Granerud | (Slovenia) Bor Pavlovčič | (Austria) Stefan Huber | (Slovenia) Nejc Dežman | |
| 851 | 25 | 4 March 2017 | (Norway) Rena (Renabakkene HS139) | L _{449} | (Austria) Clemens Aigner | (Slovenia) Bor Pavlovčič | (Slovenia) Tilen Bartol | (Slovenia) Nejc Dežman | |
| 852 | 26 | 5 March 2017 | (Norway) Rena (Renabakkene HS139) | L _{450} | (Austria) Clemens Aigner | (Austria) Daniel Huber | (Slovenia) Bor Pavlovčič | (Slovenia) Nejc Dežman | |
| 853 | 27 | 11 March 2017 | (Poland) Zakopane (Wielka Krokiew HS140) | L _{451} | (Austria) Clemens Aigner | (Germany) Constantin Schmid | (Austria) Maximilian Steiner | (Austria) Clemens Aigner | |
| 854 | 28 | 12 March 2017 | (Poland) Zakopane (Wielka Krokiew HS140) | L _{452} | (Austria) Clemens Aigner | (Austria) Maximilian Steiner | (Germany) Constantin Schmid | (Austria) Clemens Aigner | |
| | | 18 March 2017 | (Russia) Chaykovsky (Snezhinka HS 140 / 106) | L _{cnx} | cancelled due to strong wind and moved to HS106 normal hill | | | — | |
| 855 | 29 | (Note: Men's HS140 large hill cancelled competition in Chaykovsky (18 March) was moved to HS106 normal hill.)18 March 2017 | (Russia) Chaykovsky (Snezhinka HS 140 / 106) | N _{399} | (Germany) Constantin Schmid | (Czech Republic) Jakub Janda | (Austria) Clemens Aigner | (Austria) Clemens Aigner | |
| | | 19 March 2017 | (Russia) Chaykovsky (Snezhinka HS 140 / 106) | L _{cnx} | cancelled due to strong wind and moved to HS106 normal hill | | | — | |
| 856 | 30 | (Note: Men's HS140 large hill cancelled competition in Chaykovsky (19 March) was moved to HS106 normal hill.)19 March 2017 | (Russia) Chaykovsky (Snezhinka HS 140 / 106) | N _{400} | (Austria) Clemens Aigner | (Slovenia) Rok Tarman | (Austria) Daniel Huber | (Austria) Clemens Aigner | |
| 26th FIS Winter Continental Cup Men's Overall (9 December 2016 – 19 March 2017) | | | | | (Austria) Clemens Aigner | (Slovenia) Miran Zupančič | (Slovenia) Nejc Dežman | Winter Overall | |

==== Overall ====
| Rank | after 30 events | Points |
|---|---|---|
| 1 | (Austria) Clemens Aigner | 1191 |
| 2 | (Slovenia) Miran Zupančič | 938 |
| 3 | (Slovenia) Nejc Dežman | 862 |
| 4 | (Austria) Daniel Huber | 827 |
| 5 | (Austria) Stefan Huber | 702 |
| 6 | (Austria) Florian Altenburger | 674 |
| 7 | (Slovenia) Bor Pavlovčič | 627 |
| 8 | (Norway) Joakim Aune | 612 |
| 9 | (Slovenia) Jaka Hvala | 547 |
| 10 | (Austria) Maximilian Steiner | 525 |

== Women's Summer ==
Individual women's events in the CC history

| Total | L | N | M | Winners |
|---|---|---|---|---|
| 49 | — | 38 | 11 |

after normal hill event in Lillehammer (10 September 2016)

=== Calendar ===
| All | No. | Date | Place (Hill) | Size | Winner | Second | Third | Overall leader | R. |
|---|---|---|---|---|---|---|---|---|---|
| 47 | 1 | 26 August 2016 | (Germany) Oberwiesenthal (Fichtelbergschanzen HS106) | N _{036} | (France) Lucile Morat | (Germany) Katharina Althaus | (Italy) Lara Malsiner | (France) Lucile Morat | |
| 48 | 2 | 27 August 2016 | (Germany) Oberwiesenthal (Fichtelbergschanzen HS106) | N _{037} | (France) Lucile Morat | (Germany) Katharina Althaus | (Germany) Carina Vogt | (France) Lucile Morat | |
| 49 | 3 | 10 September 2016 | (Norway) Lillehammer (Lysgårdsbakken HS100) | N _{038} | (Norway) Thea Sofie Kleven | (Austria) Julia Huber | (Germany) Pauline Heßler | (France) Lucile Morat | |
| | | 11 September 2016 | (Norway) Lillehammer (Lysgårdsbakken HS100) | N _{cnx} | cancelled due to strong wind | | | — | |
| 9th FIS Summer Continental Cup Women's Overall (26 August – 10 September 2016) | | | | | (France) Lucile Morat | (Germany) Katharina Althaus | (Czech Republic) Julia Huber | Summer Overall | |

==== Overall ====
| Rank | after 3 events | Points |
|---|---|---|
| 1 | (France) Lucile Morat | 200 |
| 2 | (Germany) Katharina Althaus | 160 |
| 3 | (Austria) Julia Huber | 117 |
| | (Germany) Ramona Straub | 117 |
| 5 | (Germany) Carina Vogt | 95 |
| 6 | (Norway) Thea Sofie Kleven | 100 |
| 7 | (Italy) Lara Malsiner | 96 |
| 8 | (Germany) Juliane Seyfarth | 95 |
| 9 | (Canada) Natasha Bodnarchuk | 88 |
| 10 | (Germany) Anna Rupprecht | 86 |

== Women's Winter ==
Individual women's events in the CC history

| Total | L | N | M | Winners |
|---|---|---|---|---|
| 148 | 9 | 124 | 15 |

after normal hill event in Notodden (17 December 2016)

=== Calendar ===
| All | No. | Date | Place (Hill) | Size | Winner | Second | Third | Overall leader | R. |
|---|---|---|---|---|---|---|---|---|---|
| 147 | 1 | 16 December 2016 | (Norway) Notodden (Tveitanbakken HS100) | N _{123} | (France) Joséphine Pagnier | (Germany) Luisa Görlich | (Germany) Gianina Ernst | (France) Joséphine Pagnier | |
| 148 | 2 | 17 December 2016 | (Norway) Notodden (Tveitanbakken HS100) | N _{124} | (France) Joséphine Pagnier | (Germany) Luisa Görlich | (Germany) Pauline Hessler | (France) Joséphine Pagnier | |
| 13th FIS Winter Continental Cup Women's Overall (16 – 17 December 2016) | | | | | (France) Joséphine Pagnier | (Germany) Luisa Görlich | (Germany) Pauline Hessler | Winter Overall | |

==== Overall ====
| Rank | after 2 events | Points |
|---|---|---|
| 1 | (France) Joséphine Pagnier | 200 |
| 2 | (Germany) Luisa Görlich | 160 |
| 3 | (Germany) Pauline Hessler | 110 |
| 4 | (Austria) Sophie Mair | 95 |
| 5 | (Germany) Gianina Ernst | 80 |
| 6 | (Norway) Silje Opseth | 76 |
| 7 | (France) Océane Avocat Gros | 71 |
| 8 | (Austria) Elisabeth Raudaschl | 60 |
| 9 | (Finland) Susanna Forsström | 58 |
| 10 | (Germany) Arantxa Lancho | 55 |

== Participants ==
Overall, total of 26 countries for both men and ladies participated in this season:

Asia (4)
| Japan; Kazakhstan | South Korea; Turkey |
Europe (20)
| Austria; Bulgaria; Czech Republic; Estonia; Finland; France; Germany; Hungary; Italy; Latvia | Netherlands; Norway; Poland; Romania; Russia; Slovakia; Slovenia; Sweden; Switzerland; Ukraine |
North America (2)
| Canada | United States |

== Europa Cup vs. Continental Cup ==
- Last two Europa Cup seasons (1991/92 and 1992/93) are recognized as first two Continental Cup seasons by International Ski Federation (FIS), although Continental Cup under this name officially started first season in 1993/94 season.

== See also ==
- 2016–17 FIS World Cup
- 2016 FIS Grand Prix
- 2016–17 FIS Cup
- 2016–17 FIS Race
- 2016–17 FIS Alpen Cup
