= 2016 FIS Ski Jumping Grand Prix =

Sport competition

Grand Prix 2016
Discipline	Men	Women
Overall	(Poland) Maciej Kot	(Japan) Sara Takanashi
Nations Cup	Poland	Japan

Competition
Edition	23rd	5th
Locations	8	2
Individual	10	3
Team	1	—
Cancelled	2	2

The 2016 FIS Ski Jumping Grand Prix was the 23rd Summer Grand Prix season in ski jumping on plastic for men and the 5th for ladies.

Other competitive circuits in this season included the World Cup, Continental Cup, FIS Cup, FIS Race and Alpen Cup.

== Map of grand prix hosts ==
All eight scheduled locations for men (8) and for ladies (2) in this season. Only Almaty was canceled before the season start.

2016 FIS Ski Jumping Grand Prix (Europe)	2016 FIS Ski Jumping Grand Prix (Asia)

== Calendar ==
=== Men ===
Num	Season	Date	Place	Hill	Size	Winner	Second	Third	Yellow bib	Ref.
168	1	16 July 2016	(France) Courchevel	Tremplin du Praz HS132	LH	(Poland) Maciej Kot	(Poland) Kamil Stoch	(Austria) Stefan Kraft	(Poland) Maciej Kot	
169	2	23 July 2016	(Poland) Wisła	Malinka HS134	LH	(Poland) Maciej Kot	(Norway) Anders Fannemel	(Germany) Andreas Wellinger	(Poland) Maciej Kot	
170	3	30 July 2016	(Germany) Hinterzarten	Rothaus-Schanze HS108 (night)	NH	(Germany) Andreas Wellinger	(Poland) Maciej Kot (Austria) Stefan Kraft		(Poland) Maciej Kot	
171	4	6 August 2016	(Switzerland) Einsiedeln	Andreas Küttel Schanze HS117 (night)	LH	(Poland) Maciej Kot	(Poland) Kamil Stoch	(Austria) Michael Hayböck	(Poland) Maciej Kot	
172	5	27 August 2016	(Japan) Hakuba	Olympic Ski Jumps HS131 (night)	LH	(Norway) Anders Fannemel	(Japan) Taku Takeuchi	(Germany) Andreas Wellinger	(Poland) Maciej Kot	
173	6	28 August 2016	(Japan) Hakuba	Olympic Ski Jumps HS131	LH	(Japan) Taku Takeuchi	(Norway) Joachim Hauer	(Norway) Anders Fannemel	(Poland) Maciej Kot	
174	7	10 September 2016	(Russia) Chaykovsky	Snezhinka HS140	LH	(Slovenia) Robert Kranjec	(Slovenia) Anže Semenič	(Germany) Karl Geiger	(Poland) Maciej Kot	
175	8	11 September 2016	(Russia) Chaykovsky	Snezhinka HS140	LH	(Slovenia) Anže Semenič	(Czech Republic) Tomáš Vančura	(Czech Republic) Vojtěch Štursa	(Poland) Maciej Kot	
		17 September 2016	(Kazakhstan) Almaty	Sunkar HS140 (night)	LH	canceled two days after calendar was officially confirmed in June 2016 for financial reasons; Almaty will invest all money in 2017 Winter Universiade				
		18 September 2016	(Kazakhstan) Almaty	Sunkar HS140 (night)	LH	canceled two days after calendar was officially confirmed in June 2016 for financial reasons; Almaty will invest all money in 2017 Winter Universiade				
176	9	1 October 2016	(Austria) Hinzenbach	Aigner-Schanze HS94	NH	(Poland) Maciej Kot	(Poland) Dawid Kubacki	(Slovenia) Peter Prevc	(Poland) Maciej Kot	
177	10	2 October 2016	(Germany) Klingenthal	Vogtland Arena HS140	LH	(Poland) Maciej Kot	(Poland) Kamil Stoch	(Slovenia) Peter Prevc	(Poland) Maciej Kot	

=== Ladies ===
Num	Season	Date	Place	Hill	Size	Winner	Second	Third	Yellow bib	Ref.
18	1	16 July 2016	(France) Courchevel	Tremplin du Praz HS96	NH	(Japan) Sara Takanashi	(Austria) Chiara Hölzl	(Japan) Yūki Itō	(Japan) Sara Takanashi	
19	2	10 September 2016	(Russia) Chaykovsky	Snezhinka HS106	NH	(Japan) Sara Takanashi	(Norway) Maren Lundby	(Slovenia) Maja Vtič	(Japan) Sara Takanashi	
20	3	11 September 2016	(Russia) Chaykovsky	Snezhinka HS106	NH	(Japan) Sara Takanashi	(Germany) Carina Vogt	(Russia) Irina Avvakumova	(Japan) Sara Takanashi	
		17 September 2016	(Kazakhstan) Almaty	Sunkar HS106	NH	canceled two days after calendar was officially confirmed in June 2016 for financial reasons; Almaty will invest all money in 2017 Winter Universiade				
		18 September 2016	(Kazakhstan) Almaty	Sunkar HS106	NH	canceled two days after calendar was officially confirmed in June 2016 for financial reasons; Almaty will invest all money in 2017 Winter Universiade				

=== Men's team ===
Num	Season	Date	Place	Hill	Size	Winner	Second	Third	Yellow bib	Ref.
21	1	22 July 2016	(Poland) Wisła	Malinka HS134	LH	Norway Johann André Forfang; Tom Hilde; Joachim Hauer; Anders Fannemel	Slovenia Jurij Tepeš; Robert Kranjec; Jaka Hvala; Peter Prevc	Germany Andreas Wank; Karl Geiger; Richard Freitag; Andreas Wellinger	Norway	

== Men's standings ==
=== Overall ===
Rank	after 10 events	Points
1	(Poland) Maciej Kot	580
2	(Germany) Andreas Wellinger	351
3	(Poland) Kamil Stoch	315
4	(Austria) Stefan Kraft	304
5	(Japan) Taku Takeuchi	280

=== Nations Cup ===
Rank	after 11 events	Points
1	Poland	1559
2	Slovenia	1410
5	Germany	1382
3	Norway	1211
4	Austria	1171

=== Prize money ===
Rank	after 11 events	CHF
1	(Poland) Maciej Kot	27,500
2	(Norway) Anders Fannemel	11,500
3	(Germany) Andreas Wellinger	10,500
4	(Japan) Taku Takeuchi	9,000
	(Poland) Kamil Stoch	9,000

== Ladies' standings ==
=== Overall ===
Rank	after 3 events	Points
1	(Japan) Sara Takanashi	300
2	(Germany) Carina Vogt	160
3	(Russia) Irina Avvakumova	155
4	(Japan) Yūki Itō	137
	(Japan) Yūka Setō	112

=== Nations Cup ===
Rank	after 3 events	Points
1	Japan	654
2	Germany	428
3	Russia	270
4	Slovenia	215
5	Italy	147

=== Prize money ===
Rank	after 3 events	CHF
1	(Japan) Sara Takanashi	7,000
2	(Germany) Carina Vogt	2,000
3	(Russia) Irina Avvakumova	1,750
4	(Norway) Maren Lundby	1,500
	(Austria) Chiara Hölzl	1,500
