= 2018 Nordic Junior World Ski Championships =

International skiing competition

FIS Nordic Junior and U23 World Ski Championships 2018
- Host city: Kandersteg, Switzerland; Goms, Switzerland
- Events: 22
- Opening: 27 January
- Closing: 4 February
- Main venue: Nordic Arena Kandersteg, Goms Nordic Center
- Website: jwsc2018.ch

The FIS Nordic Junior and U23 World Ski Championships 2018 took place in Kandersteg and Goms, Switzerland from 27 January to 4 February 2018. This was the 41st Junior World Championships and the 13th Under-23 World Championships in Nordic skiing.

== Schedule ==
All times are local (UTC+1).

Cross-country

Date	Time	Event
28 January	12:30	Men's junior sprint Ladies' junior sprint
29 January	12:30	Men's under-23 sprint Ladies' under-23 sprint
30 January	10:30	Ladies' junior 5 km classic
30 January	12:30	Men's junior 10 km classic
31 January	10:30	Ladies' under-23 10 km classic
31 January	12:30	Men's under-23 15 km classic
1 February	10:30	Ladies' junior 2x5 km skiathlon
1 February	12:30	Men's junior 2x10 km skiathlon
2 February	10:30	Ladies' under-23 2x7.5 km skiathlon
2 February	12:30	Men's under-23 2x15 km skiathlon
3 February	10:30	Ladies' junior 4×3.33 km relay
3 February	12:30	Men's junior 4×5 km relay

Nordic combined

Date	Time	Event
30 January	10:00; 14:00	HS106 / 10 km
1 February	10:00; 14:00	Team HS106 / 4x5 km
3 February	10:00; 14:00	HS106 / 5 km

Ski jumping

Date	Time	Event
1 February	19:15	Men's HS106
2 February	16:00	Ladies' HS106
3 February	16:00	Ladies' team HS106
3 February	19:00	Men's team HS106
4 February	11:00	Mixed team HS106

== Medal summary ==
=== Junior events ===
==== Cross-country skiing ====
Event	Gold		Silver		Bronze	
Men's Junior Events
Men's junior sprint free	Tom Mancini; France	2:59.77	Jørgen Lippert; Norway	2:59.87	Valerio Grond; Switzerland	3:05.34
Men's junior 10 kilometre classic	Jon Rolf Skamo Hope; Norway	24:58.8	Sergey Ardashev; Russia	25:07.8	Jørgen Lippert; Norway	25:26.7
Men's junior 20 kilometre skiathlon	Harald Østberg Amundsen; Norway	58:45.7	Jon Rolf Skamo Hope; Norway	59:20.4	Jørgen Lippert; Norway	59:45.8
Men's junior 4 × 5 kilometre relay	Norway; Harald Østberg Amundsen; Jon Rolf Skamo Hope; Håvard Moseby; Jørgen Lippert	50:04.2	United States; Luke Jager; Ben Ogden; Hunter Wonders; Gus Schumacher	50:06.4	Russia; Kirill Kilivnyuk; Sergey Ardashev; Yaroslav Rybochkin; Alexander Terentyev	50:09.7
Ladies' Junior Events
Ladies' junior sprint free	Moa Lundgren; Sweden	2:52.55	Kristine Stavås Skistad; Norway	2:54.44	Frida Karlsson; Sweden	2:54.91
Ladies' junior 5 kilometre classic	Polina Nekrasova; Russia	13:58.7	Hailey Swirbul; United States	14:13.1	Anita Korva; Finland	14:24.1
Ladies' junior 10 kilometre skiathlon	Frida Karlsson; Sweden	32:55.7	Lone Johansen; Norway	33:31.2	Hailey Swirbul; United States	33:31.9
Ladies' junior 4 × 3.33 kilometre relay	Germany; Alexandra Danner; Celine Mayer; Lisa Lohmann; Anna-Maria Dietze	39:17.4	Russia; Polina Nekrasova; Hristina Matsokina; Nina Dubotolkina; Maya Yakunina	39:26.0	Sweden; Tua Dahlgren; Frida Karlsson; Alicia Persson; Johanna Hagström	40:04.9

==== Nordic combined ====
Event	Gold		Silver		Bronze	
Individual normal hill/10 km	Ondřej Pažout; Czech Republic	22:58.3	Einar Lurås Oftebro; Norway	23:00.6	Ben Loomis; United States	23:06.6
Individual normal hill/5 km	Vid Vrhovnik; Slovenia	11:28.8	Dominik Terzer; Austria	11:33.7	Jan Vytrval; Czech Republic	11:34.2
Team normal hill/4 × 5 km	Austria; Johannes Lamparter; Florian Dagn; Dominik Terzer; Mika Vermeulen	56:33.0	Germany; Tim Kopp; Luis Lehnert; Constantin Schnurr; Julian Schmid	57:20.8	Norway; Jens Lurås Oftebro; Simen Kvarstad; Andreas Skoglund; Einar Lurås Oftebro	58:26.2

==== Ski jumping ====
Event	Gold		Silver		Bronze	
Men's Junior Events
Men's individual normal hill	Marius Lindvik; Norway	291.4	Constantin Schmid; Germany	282.1	Clemens Leitner; Austria	267.1
Men's team normal hill	Germany; Philipp Raimund; Justin Lisso; Cedrik Weigel; Constantin Schmid	1068.5	Austria; Mika Schwann; Jan Hörl; Maximilian Lienher; Clemens Leitner	1063.7	Norway; Fredrik Villumstad; Jesper Ødegård; Thomas Aasen Markeng; Marius Lindvik	1037.0
Ladies' Junior Events
Ladies' individual normal hill	Nika Križnar; Slovenia	262.6	Ema Klinec; Slovenia	248.3	Anna Odine Strøm; Norway	231.7
Ladies' team normal hill	Slovenia; Jerneja Brecl; Nika Križnar; Katra Komar; Ema Klinec	733.1	Russia; Ksenia Kablukova; Alexandra Kustova; Lidiia Iakovleva; Sofia Tikhonova	622.7	France; Océane Paillard; Joséphine Pagnier; Romane Dieu; Lucile Morat	571.2
Mixed Junior Events
Mixed team normal hill	Norway; Silje Opseth; Fredrik Villumstad; Anna Odine Strøm; Marius Lindvik	869.3	Germany; Luisa Görlich; Justin Lisso; Gianina Ernst; Constantin Schmid	855.0	Austria; Claudia Purker; Jan Hörl; Sophie Mair; Clemens Leitner	775.8

=== Under-23 events ===
==== Cross-country skiing ====
Event	Gold		Silver		Bronze	
Men's Under-23 Events
Men's under-23 sprint free	Erik Valnes; Norway	2:56.38	Jan Thomas Jenssen; Norway	2:56.62	Even Northug; Norway	3:02.72
Men's under-23 15 kilometre classic	Mattis Stenshagen; Norway	36:28.3	Denis Spitsov; Russia	36:33.1	Ivan Yakimushkin; Russia	37:03.5
Men's under-23 30 kilometre skiathlon	Denis Spitsov; Russia	1:18:14.9	Jules Lapierre; France	1:18:17.8	Ole Jørgen Bruvoll; Norway	1:18:36.4
Ladies' Under-23 Events
Ladies' under-23 sprint free	Tiril Udnes Weng; Norway	2:50.24	Nadine Fähndrich; Switzerland	2:50.32	Natalya Nepryayeva; Russia	2:55.02
Ladies' under-23 10 kilometre classic	Yana Kirpichenko; Russia	27:46.1	Anna Zherebyateva; Russia	28:00.0	Nadine Fähndrich; Switzerland	28:15.7
Ladies' under-23 15 kilometre skiathlon	Anastasia Sedova; Russia	44:03.6	Natalya Nepryayeva; Russia	44:14.3	Yana Kirpichenko; Russia	44:40.8

=== Medal table ===
* Host nation (Switzerland)

Rank	Nation	Gold	Silver	Bronze	Total
1	Norway (NOR)	8	6	7	21
2	Russia (RUS)	4	6	4	14
3	Slovenia (SLO)	3	1	0	4
4	Germany (GER)	2	3	0	5
5	Sweden (SWE)	2	0	2	4
6	Austria (AUT)	1	2	2	5
7	France (FRA)	1	1	1	3
8	Czech Republic (CZE)	1	0	1	2
9	United States (USA)	0	2	2	4
10	Switzerland (SUI)*	0	1	2	3
11	Finland (FIN)	0	0	1	1
Totals (11 entries)		22	22	22	66
