= Jonathan Learoyd =

French ski jumper

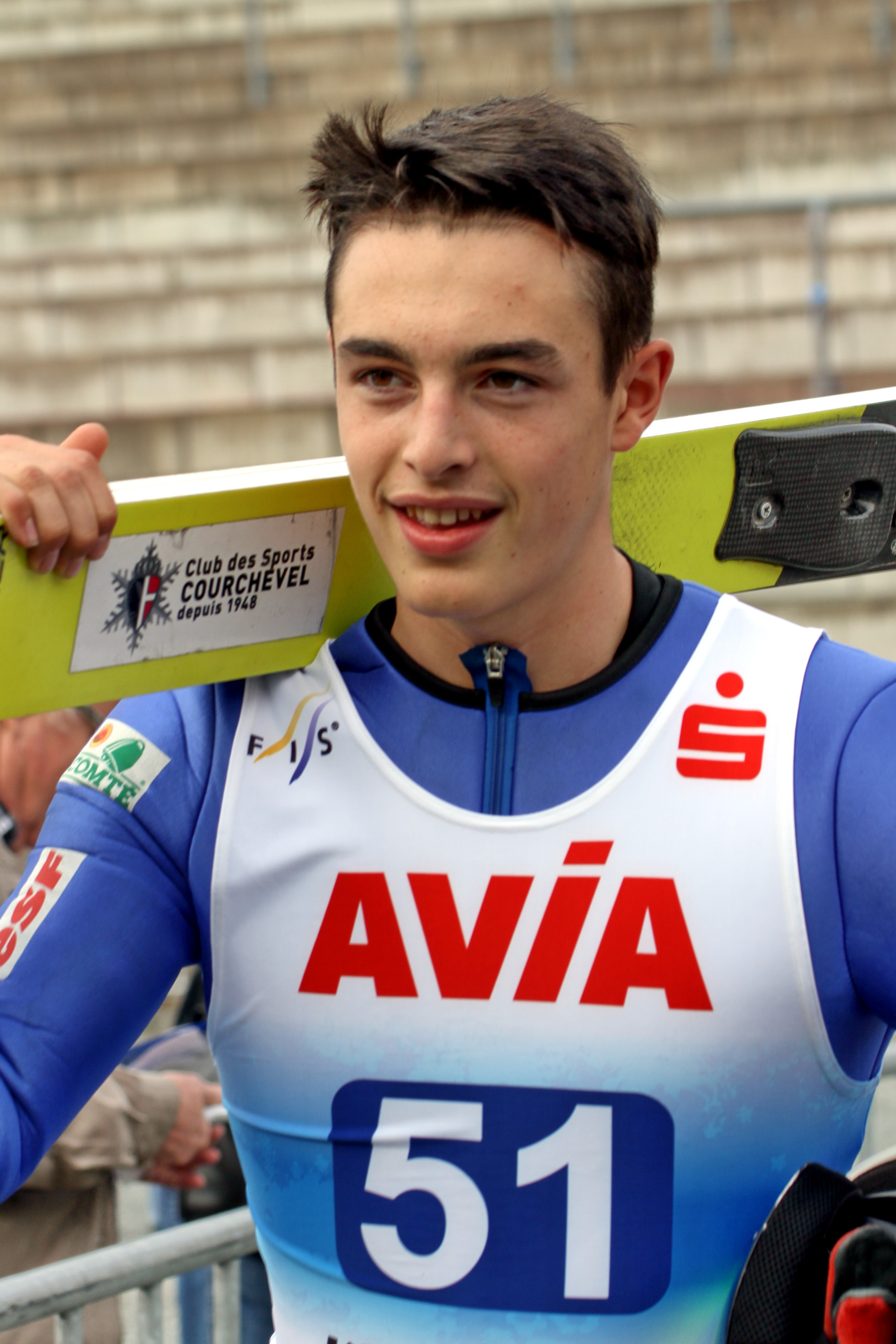

Personal information
- Nationality: France
- Born: 3 November 2000 (age 25) Albertville, France

Sport
- Sport: Skiing
- Club: CS Courchevel

World Cup career
- Seasons: 2018–present
- Indiv. starts: 14

Achievements and titles
- Personal bests: 201 m (659 ft); Vikersund, 15 March 2019
- Updated on 12 March 2020

Jonathan "Jonty" Learoyd (born 3 November 2000) is a French former ski jumper. He also holds British citizenship as both of his parents originate from London.

== Career ==
He took three silver medals at 2017 European Youth Olympic Winter Festival in Erzurum. He made his World Cup debut on 16 December 2017 in Engelberg, Switzerland and finished at 35th place.

== World Cup results ==
=== Standings ===
| Season | Overall | 4H | SF | RA | W5 | T5 | P7 |
|---|---|---|---|---|---|---|---|
| 2017/18 | 63 | 44 | — | 40 | — | N/A | — |
| 2018/19 | — | 60 | — | 66 | — | N/A | — |
| 2019/20 | — | — | — | — | — | — | N/A |

=== Individual starts (14) ===
winner (1); second (2); third (3); did not compete (–); failed to qualify (q); disqualified (DQ)
| Season | 1 | 2 | 3 | 4 | 5 | 6 | 7 | 8 | 9 | 10 | 11 | 12 | 13 | 14 | 15 | 16 | 17 | 18 | 19 | 20 | 21 | 22 | 23 | 24 | 25 | 26 | 27 | 28 | 29 | Points |
| 2017/18 | Wisła | Kuusamo | Nizhny Tagil | Nizhny Tagil | Titisee-Neustadt | Engelberg | Engelberg | Oberstdorf | Garmisch-Partenkirchen | Innsbruck | Bischofshofen | Tauplitz | Zakopane | Willingen | Willingen | Lahti | Oslo | Lillehammer | Trondheim | Vikersund | Planica | Planica | | | | | | | | 8 |
| 2017/18 | – | – | – | – | – | 35 | 39 | 29 | 46 | – | – | – | – | – | – | – | 25 | 41 | 41 | – | – | – | | | | | | | | 8 |
| 2018/19 | Wisła | Kuusamo | Kuusamo | Nizhny Tagil | Nizhny Tagil | Engelberg | Engelberg | Oberstdorf | Garmisch-Partenkirchen | Innsbruck | Bischofshofen | Val di Fiemme | Val di Fiemme | Zakopane | Sapporo | Sapporo | Oberstdorf | Oberstdorf | Oberstdorf | Lahti | Willingen | Willingen | Oslo | Lillehammer | Trondheim | Vikersund | Planica | Planica | | 0 |
| 2018/19 | – | 50 | q | – | – | 46 | 45 | 38 | q | – | – | – | – | – | – | – | – | – | – | – | – | – | 44 | 43 | q | 40 | – | – | | 0 |
| 2019/20 | Wisła | Kuusamo | Nizhny Tagil | Nizhny Tagil | Klingenthal | Engelberg | Engelberg | Oberstdorf | Garmisch-Partenkirchen | Innsbruck | Bischofshofen | Val di Fiemme | Val di Fiemme | Titisee-Neustadt | Titisee-Neustadt | Zakopane | Sapporo | Sapporo | Willingen | Tauplitz | Tauplitz | Râșnov | Râșnov | Lahti | Lahti | Oslo | Lillehammer | | | 9 |
| 2019/20 | – | – | – | – | – | – | – | q | q | q | – | – | – | – | – | – | – | – | – | – | – | – | – | – | – | – | – | | | 9 |
