= Ski jumping at the 2017 European Youth Olympic Winter Festival =

Ski jumping at the 2017 European Youth Olympic Winter Festival was held in Erzurum, Turkey at the Kiremitlik Hill Ski Jumping Facility from 13 to 17 February 2017.

== Medal table ==
Rank	Nation	Gold	Silver	Bronze	Total
1	Slovenia (SLO)	3	1	1	5
2	France (FRA)	1	3	1	5
3	Russia (RUS)	0	0	2	2
Totals (3 entries)		4	4	4	12

== Results ==
=== Men's events ===
Event	Gold				Silver				Bronze			
Individual	Timi Zajc (SLO)	107.0	100.0	261.3	Jonathan Learoyd (FRA)	101.5	98.5	246.4	Mathis Contamine (FRA)	96.0	97.0	240.7
Team	Slovenia (SLO); Lovro Vodušek; Bernard Dobre; Tomi Jovan; Timi Zajc	457.0	479.2	936.2	France (FRA); Mathis Contamine; Romane Dieu; Alessandro Batby; Jonathan Learoyd	437.2	454.4	891.6	Russia (RUS); Aleksandr Loginov; Artem Yudin; Ilya Baskakov; Aleksandr Marchukov	369.9	421.1	791.0

=== Ladies events ===
Event	Gold				Silver				Bronze			
Individual	Romane Dieu (FRA)	95.0	96.5	223.7	Nika Križnar (SLO)	99.5	98.5	211.8	Katra Komar (SLO)	94.0	90.0	204.1

=== Mixed events ===
Event	Gold				Silver				Bronze			
Team	Slovenia (SLO); Nika Križnar; Tomi Jovan; Katra Komar; Timi Zajc	445.9	390.7	836.6	France (FRA); Marine Bressand; Mathis Contamine; Romane Dieu; Jonathan Learoyd	364.4	348.8	713.2	Russia (RUS); Lidiia Iakovleva; Ilya Baskakov; Aleksandra Barantceva; Aleksandr Marchukov	326.6	327.3	653.9
