= 2016–17 FIS Race (ski jumping) =

FIS Race 2016/17

The 2016/17 FIS Race (ski jumping) was the 18th FIS Race regular season as the fourth level of ski jumping competition since 1999/00. Although even before the world cup and in the old days FIS Race events were all top level organized competitions.

Other competitive circuits this season included the World Cup, Grand Prix, Continental Cup, FIS Cup and Alpen Cup.

== Calendar ==
=== Men ===
Season	Date	Place	Hill	Size	Winner	Second	Third	Ref.
1	29 September 2016	(Romania) Râșnov	Trambulina Valea Cărbunării HS71	MH	(Romania) Nicolae Sorin Mitrofan	(Romania) Stefan Valentin Blega	(Ukraine) Dmytro Mazurchuk	
2	30 September 2016	(Romania) Râșnov	Trambulina Valea Cărbunării HS71	MH	(Romania) Stefan Valentin Blega	(Romania) Mihnea Alexandru Spulber	(Turkey) Muhammed Ali Bedir	
3	21 February 2017	(Japan) Sapporo	Miyanomori HS100	NH	(Japan) Yukiya Satō	(Japan) Yūken Iwasa	(Kazakhstan) Sergey Tkachenko	
4	24 February 2017	(Japan) Sapporo	Ōkurayama HS134	LH	(Japan) Naoki Nakamura	(Japan) Yūken Iwasa	(Kazakhstan) Marat Zhaparov	
5	1 April 2017	(Canada) Whistler	Whistler Olympic Park HS106	NH	(Canada) MacKenzie Boyd-Clowes	(Canada) Matthew Soukup	(Canada) Joshua Maurer	
6	2 April 2017	(Canada) Whistler	Whistler Olympic Park HS140	LH	(United States) Adam Loomis	(Canada) MacKenzie Boyd-Clowes	(Canada) Joshua Maurer	

=== Ladies ===
Season	Date	Place	Hill	Size	Winner	Second	Third	Ref.
1	29 September 2016	(Romania) Râșnov	Trambulina Valea Cărbunării HS71	MH		(Hungary) Virág Vörös	(Latvia) Sarlote Skele	
2	30 September 2016	(Romania) Râșnov	Trambulina Valea Cărbunării HS71	MH		(Latvia) Sarlote Skele	(Romania) Carina Alexandra Militaru	
3	3 March 2017	(Japan) Sapporo	Miyanomori HS100	NH	(Japan) Yūki Itō	(Japan) Sara Takanashi	(Japan) Misaki Shigeno	
4	5 March 2017	(Japan) Sapporo	Ōkurayama HS137	LH	(Japan) Yūki Itō	(Japan) Sara Takanashi	(Japan) Kaori Iwabuchi	
5	1 April 2017	(Canada) Whistler	Whistler Olympic Park HS106	NH	(Canada) Taylor Henrich	(Canada) Natasha Bodnarchuk	(Canada) Atsuko Takanaka	
6	2 April 2017	(Canada) Whistler	Whistler Olympic Park HS140	LH	(Canada) Taylor Henrich	(Canada) Abigail Strate	(Canada) Atsuko Takanaka	

=== Men's team ===
Season	Date	Place	Hill	Size	Winner	Second	Third	Ref.
1	25 February 2017	(Japan) Sapporo	Ōkurayama HS134	LH	Japan Naoki Nakamura; Masamitsu Itō; Yūken Iwasa; Yukiya Satō	Kazakhstan Konstantin Sokolenko; Sabirzhan Muhinov; Marat Zhaparov; Sergey Tkachenko	South Korea Juchan Lee; Choi Heung-chul; Kim Hyun-ki; Choi Seou	
