= Romane Dieu =

French ski jumper

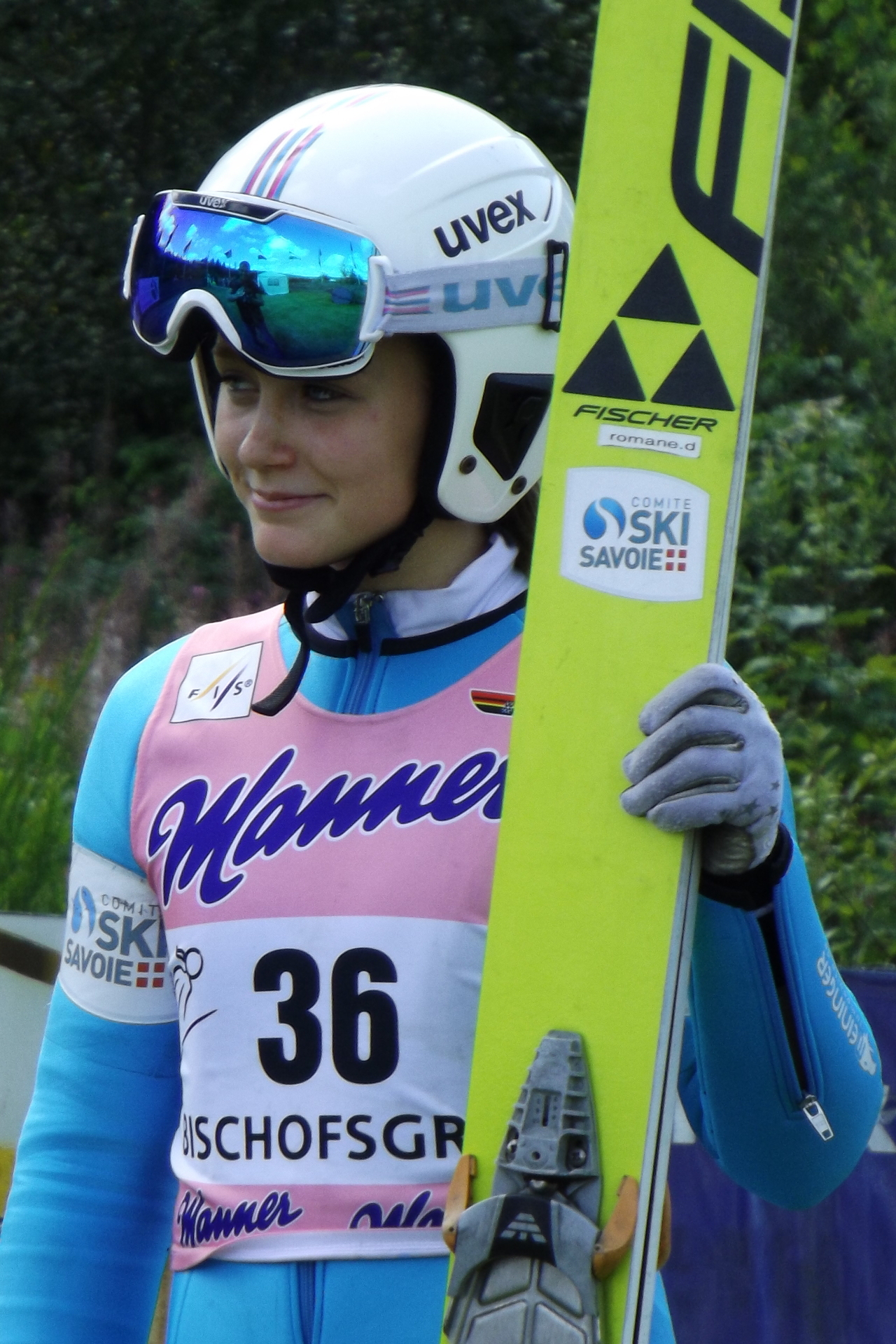
- Dieu in Bischofsgrün, 2016

Personal information
- Nationality: France
- Born: 19 December 2000 (age 25)

Sport
- Sport: Skiing
- Club: Club des sports Courchevel

World Cup career
- Seasons: 2017–2018
- Indiv. starts: 10
- Indiv. podiums: 1
- Team starts: 1
- Team podiums: 1
Medal record
Women's ski jumping
European Youth Olympic Festival
Gold medal – first place	Erzurum 2017	Individual NH
Silver medal – second place	Erzurum 2017	Team NH
Junior World Championships
Bronze medal – third place	Kandersteg 2018	Team NH
- Updated on 28 January 2023

Romane Dieu (born 19 December 2000) is a French former ski jumper who competed at World Cup level from 2017 to 2018.

== Career ==
Dieu's best individual World Cup result was 26th place in Hinzenbach on 4 February 2017. Her best team result was third in Hinterzarten on 16 December 2017, in what was first ever women's World Cup team competition.

At the 2017 European Youth Olympic Winter Festival in Erzurum, Dieu won an individual gold medal and a team silver medal. At the 2018 Junior World Championships in Kandersteg, she won a team bronze medal.
