= Lucile Morat =

French ski jumper (born 2001)

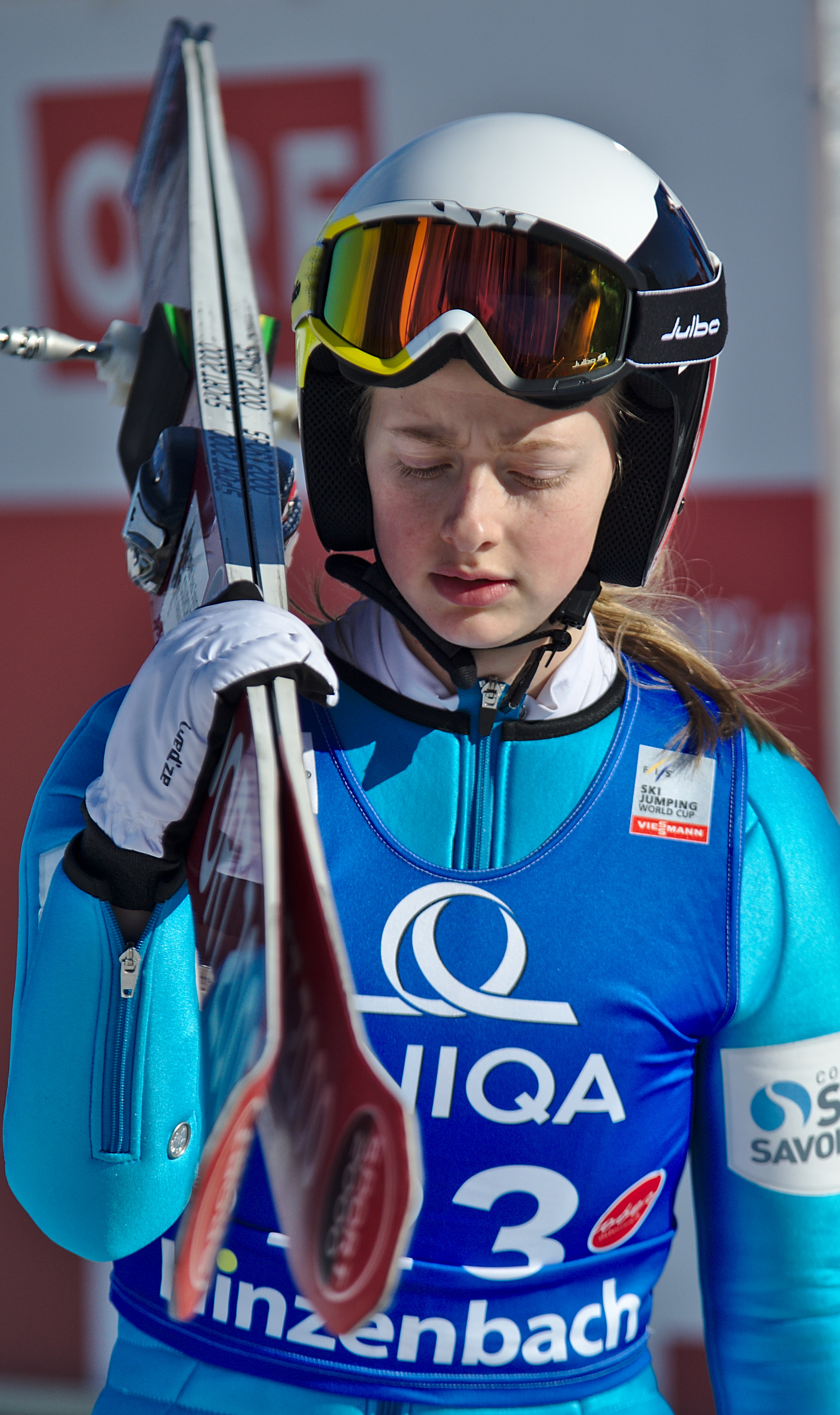
- Morat in Hinzenbach, 2017

Personal information
- Nationality: France
- Born: 15 June 2001 (age 25) Courchevel, France

Sport
- Sport: Skiing
- Club: Club des sports Courchevel

World Cup career
- Seasons: 2017–2021
- Indiv. starts: 51
- Indiv. podiums: 1
- Team starts: 3
- Team podiums: 1
Medal record
Women's ski jumping
Junior World Championships
| Bronze medal – third place | Kandersteg 2018 | Team NH |
- Updated on 28 January 2023

Lucile Morat (born 15 June 2001) is a French ski jumper. She has competed at World Cup level since the 2016/17 season, with her best individual result being sixth place in Nizhny Tagil on 11 December 2016. Representing the French national team, she finished third in the first ever women's World Cup team competition in Hinterzarten on 16 December 2017. At the 2018 Junior World Championships in Kandersteg, she won a team bronze medal.
