= Daniel Huber =

Swiss mathematician and astronomer (1786–1839)

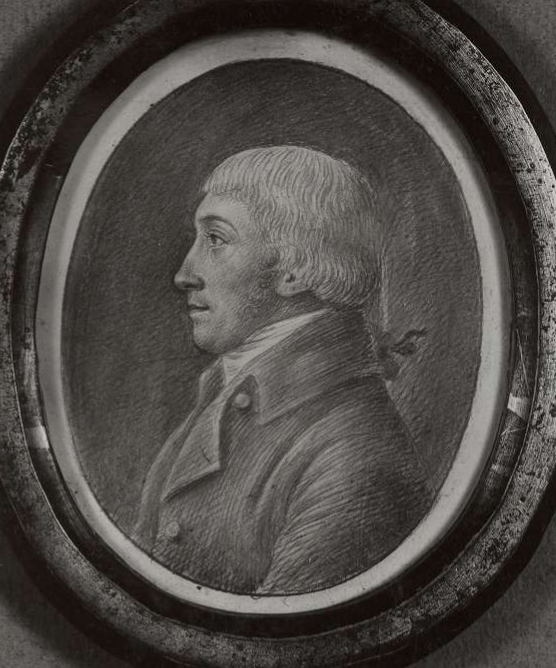
Daniel Huber

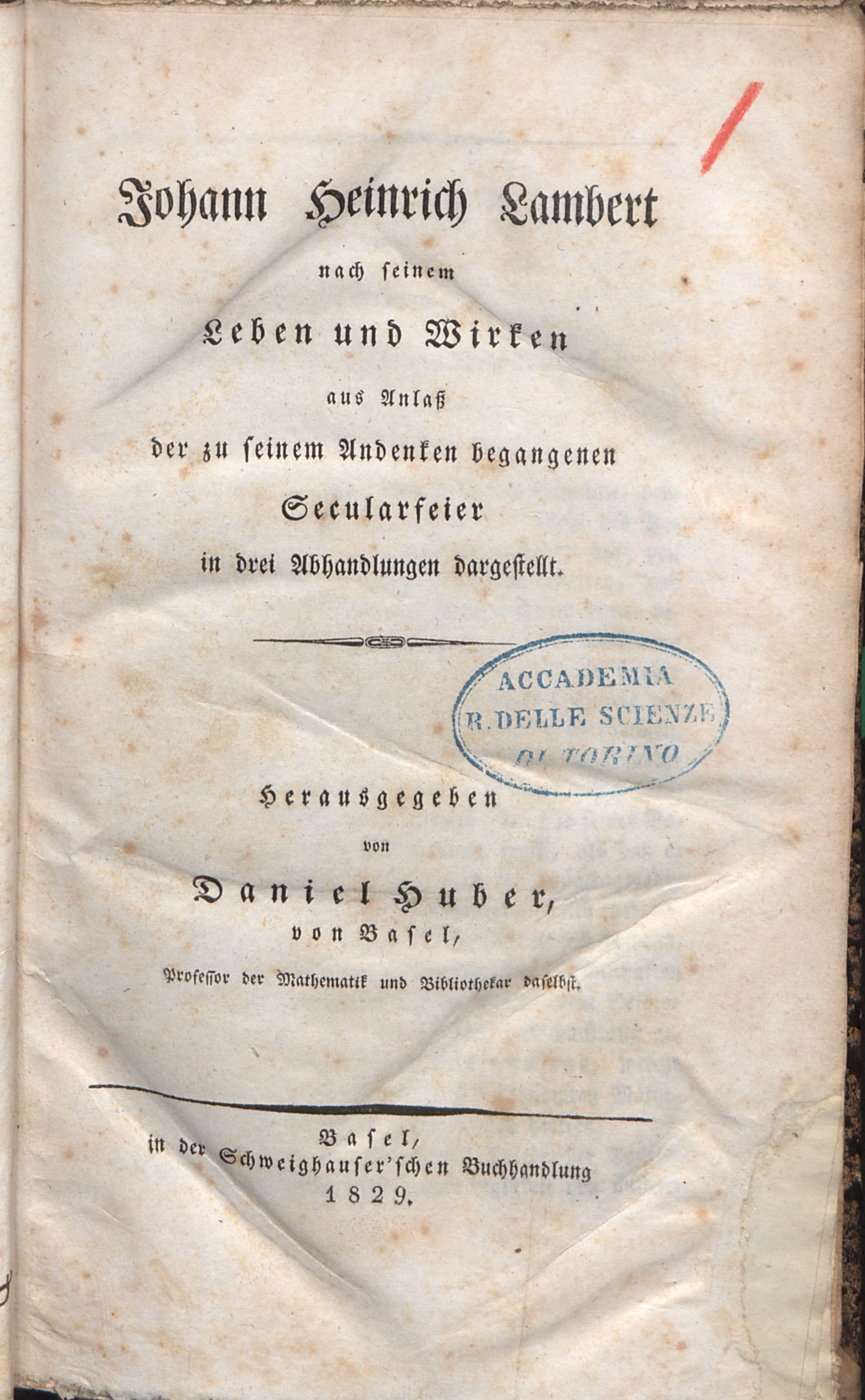
Johann Heinrich Lambert nach seinem Leben und Wirken, 1829

Daniel Huber (23 June 1768, Basel – 3 December 1829, Basel) was a Swiss mathematician and astronomer. He worked at the University of Basel and became chancellor in 1804 at the University of Basel, and is noted for establishing one of Switzerland's earliest continuous instrumental meteorological series.

== Career ==
Huber came from a distinguished academic family in Basel—his father was an astronomer and his brother a historian and pastor. He studied classical philology and medicine at the University of Basel before his appointment in 1792 as professor of mathematics at the same institution. In 1802, he was named director of the University Library, and in 1804, he was elected chancellor of the university. His research encompassed observational astronomy—including studies of comets—and problems in optics. From 1815, he took part in the trigonometric surveys of Basel, which helped lay the groundwork for a national meteorological network. In 1817, he founded the Natural Sciences Society of Basel.

== Meteorological observations ==
From 1789 until his death in 1829, Huber maintained one of Switzerland's longest early instrumental meteorological records. Observations began at the Haus zur Eich} in the St Alban district (1789–1802) before moving to his official residence behind Basel Cathedral (1802–1829). Using up to ten different barometers and thermometers—in parallel at times—he logged over 30,888 measurement times across more than 11,518 days, with as many as 13 readings per day. He was the first observer in Switzerland to employ a centigrade (Celsius) thermometer for regular meteorological measurements. His series overlaps those of Johann Jakob d'Annone (1755–1804) and Peter Merian (1826–1863), thereby filling the critical gap covering the "Year Without a Summer" and the late Little Ice Age.

== Legacy ==
Huber's data have since been digitized and subjected to modern quality control, revealing internal consistency that often exceeds that of his contemporaries. The wealth of parallel measurements—using different instruments and exposures—provides a powerful tool for bias correction in eighteenth- and nineteenth-century climate studies, and underpins efforts to construct a fully Basel-based long-term climate series.

== Works ==
- Huber, Daniel (1823). Nova theoria de parallelarum rectarum proprietatibus. Basileae: Johann Schweighauser.
- Huber, Daniel (1829). Johann Heinrich Lambert nach seinem Leben und Wirken. Basel: Johann Schweighauser.
