= FIS Nordic World Ski Championships 2023 – Women's individual normal hill =

Women's individual normal hill at the FIS Nordic World Ski Championships 2023
- Venue: Srednja skakalnica (HS102)
- Location: Planica, Slovenia
- Dates: 22 February (qualification); 23 February
- Competitors: 40 from 14 nations
- Winning points: 249.1

Medalists
gold medal	Katharina Althaus	Germany
silver medal	Eva Pinkelnig	Austria
bronze medal	Anna Odine Strøm	Norway

The Women's individual normal hill competition at the FIS Nordic World Ski Championships 2023 was held on 22 and 23 February 2023.

== Results ==
=== Qualification ===
The qualification was held on 22 February at 16:30.

Rank	Bib	Name	Country	Distance (m)	Points	Notes
1	55	Anna Odine Strøm	Norway	99.0	123.2	Q
2	56	Katharina Althaus	Germany	98.5	123.0	Q
3	48	Yūki Itō	Japan	94.5	122.3	Q
4	44	Alexandria Loutitt	Canada	99.5	121.0	Q
5	57	Eva Pinkelnig	Austria	99.0	120.8	Q
6	41	Anna Rupprecht	Germany	96.0	115.9	Q
7	46	Thea Minyan Bjørseth	Norway	95.0	115.5	Q
8	51	Nika Križnar	Slovenia	95.0	113.1	Q
9	54	Ema Klinec	Slovenia	94.5	112.0	Q
10	47	Nozomi Maruyama	Japan	95.0	111.8	Q
11	34	Julia Mühlbacher	Austria	95.5	110.7	Q
12	53	Selina Freitag	Germany	94.5	110.6	Q
13	32	Maja Vtič	Slovenia	92.5	109.8	Q
14	38	Lara Malsiner	Italy	91.5	109.0	Q
15	30	Jenny Rautionaho	Finland	92.5	107.1	Q
16	48	Abigail Strate	Canada	93.0	106.6	Q
17	50	Sara Takanashi	Japan	91.0	105.6	Q
18	31	Maren Lundby	Norway	91.0	105.2	Q
19	35	Eirin Maria Kvandal	Norway	91.0	104.8	Q
20	37	Luisa Görlich	Germany	92.0	104.5	Q
21	42	Yūka Setō	Japan	91.0	104.4	Q
22	45	Marita Kramer	Austria	90.0	102.8	Q
23	36	Daniela Haralambie	Romania	90.5	102.7	Q
24	42	Joséphine Pagnier	France	90.0	102.3	Q
25	40	Nika Prevc	Slovenia	89.0	101.2	Q
26	52	Chiara Kreuzer	Austria	90.0	99.5	Q
27	26	Liu Qi	China	87.5	98.2	Q
28	29	Katra Komar	Slovenia	87.0	97.7	Q
29	39	Julia Clair	France	85.0	95.1	Q
30	33	Jessica Malsiner	Italy	87.5	95.0	Q
31	18	Nicole Konderla	Poland	87.5	94.9	Q
32	28	Annika Belshaw	United States	85.0	94.3	Q
33	15	Natalie Eilers	Canada	83.5	92.6	Q
34	21	Li Xueyao	China	84.0	90.9	Q
35	25	Paige Jones	United States	83.0	90.7	Q
36	4	Klára Ulrichová	Czech Republic	82.5	90.3	Q
37	24	Karolína Indráčková	Czech Republic	80.5	89.6	Q
38	2	Anežka Indráčková	Czech Republic	82.0	88.6	Q
39	19	Peng Qingyue	China	83.0	88.1	Q
40	22	Wang Liangyao	China	83.0	87.9	Q
41	17	Josie Johnson	United States	82.0	86.8	
42	23	Sina Arnet	Switzerland	80.5	84.6	
43	12	Kinga Rajda	Poland	81.0	83.7	
44	16	Emely Torazza	Switzerland	79.5	82.1	
45	7	Emma Chervet	France	79.0	80.2	
46	5	Lilou Zepchi	France	77.0	79.8	
47	27	Julia Kykkänen	Finland	77.0	79.2	
48	20	Nicole Maurer	Canada	79.0	78.3	
49	6	Samantha Macuga	United States	76.5	78.1	
50	9	Anna Twardosz	Poland	78.0	76.6	
51	14	Paulina Cieślar	Poland	75.5	75.5	
52	10	Alessia Mitu	Romania	77.5	73.2	
53	8	Veronika Shishkina	Kazakhstan	71.5	63.2	
54	3	Tetiana Pylypchuk	Ukraine	71.0	58.4	
55	11	Zhanna Hlukhova	Ukraine	70.0	57.2	
56	13	Mariya Yudakova	Kazakhstan	63.5	42.3	
57	1	Esmeralda Gobozova	Georgia	63.0	40.4	

=== Final ===
The first round was started on 23 February at 17:00 and the final round at 17:58.

Rank	Bib	Name	Country	Round 1			Final round			Total
Rank	Bib	Name	Country	Distance (m)	Points	Rank	Distance (m)	Points	Rank	Points
1st place, gold medalist(s)	39	Katharina Althaus	Germany	98.5	126.5	2	97.0	122.6	2	249.1
2nd place, silver medalist(s)	40	Eva Pinkelnig	Austria	96.5	122.7	3	100.0	124.2	1	246.9
3rd place, bronze medalist(s)	38	Anna Odine Strøm	Norway	100.0	131.2	1	95.0	114.8	5	246.0
4	36	Selina Freitag	Germany	97.0	121.6	4	98.0	119.0	4	240.6
5	29	Thea Minyan Bjørseth	Norway	95.0	118.9	5	97.5	120.4	3	239.3
6	32	Yūki Itō	Japan	92.5	118.8	6	94.5	110.5	12	229.3
7	14	Maren Lundby	Norway	94.5	117.1	7	94.0	110.3	13	227.4
8	30	Nozomi Maruyama	Japan	94.0	115.5	9	97.0	111.5	10	227.0
9	24	Anna Rupprecht	Germany	95.0	113.7	10	96.0	112.7	7	226.4
10	31	Abigail Strate	Canada	93.0	112.6	12	93.0	111.6	8	224.2
11	34	Nika Križnar	Slovenia	92.5	109.1	18	95.0	114.5	6	223.6
11	17	Julia Mühlbacher	Austria	92.5	113.5	11	92.0	110.1	14	223.6
13	26	Joséphine Pagnier	France	92.0	108.0	19	93.5	111.6	8	219.6
14	35	Chiara Kreuzer	Austria	90.5	109.8	17	91.5	109.2	15	219.0
15	20	Luisa Görlich	Germany	91.5	111.0	13	90.5	104.4	16	215.4
16	13	Jenny Rautionaho	Finland	92.0	110.7	15	87.5	102.7	22	213.4
17	23	Nika Prevc	Slovenia	88.0	101.3	29	94.5	110.7	11	212.0
18	21	Lara Malsiner	Italy	90.0	107.4	21	92.0	104.3	17	211.7
19	37	Ema Klinec	Slovenia	90.5	107.4	21	91.5	103.6	18	211.0
20	33	Sara Takanashi	Japan	93.5	110.9	14	89.0	100.0	25	210.9
21	18	Eirin Maria Kvandal	Norway	93.0	110.3	16	89.0	100.2	24	210.5
22	19	Daniela Haralambie	Romania	90.0	106.9	23	92.0	103.5	19	210.4
23	28	Marita Kramer	Austria	92.0	106.2	24	93.0	103.1	21	209.3
24	10	Liu Qi	China	90.0	101.8	28	92.0	103.5	19	205.3
25	12	Katra Komar	Slovenia	88.5	102.1	27	89.0	101.7	23	203.8
26	27	Alexandria Loutitt	Canada	96.5	116.6	8	85.5	86.3	30	202.9
27	25	Yūka Setō	Japan	90.0	105.6	25	88.0	95.8	27	201.4
28	16	Jessica Malsiner	Italy	91.0	104.1	26	88.0	96.7	26	200.8
29	15	Maja Vtič	Slovenia	91.0	107.7	20	85.5	91.5	29	199.2
30	6	Li Xueyao	China	87.0	97.1	30	85.5	91.6	28	188.7
31	11	Annika Belshaw	United States	85.0	95.2	31	Did not qualify			
32	1	Anežka Indráčková	Czech Republic	85.0	95.0	32	Did not qualify			
33	22	Julia Clair	France	85.5	92.6	33	Did not qualify			
34	4	Nicole Konderla	Poland	85.5	92.4	34	Did not qualify			
35	2	Klára Ulrichová	Czech Republic	84.5	91.9	35	Did not qualify			
36	8	Karolína Indráčková	Czech Republic	83.5	90.0	36	Did not qualify			
37	5	Peng Qingyue	China	83.5	89.4	37	Did not qualify			
38	9	Paige Jones	United States	84.0	87.8	38	Did not qualify			
39	3	Natalie Eilers	Canada	81.0	84.6	39	Did not qualify			
40	7	Wang Liangyao	China	82.0	81.3	40	Did not qualify			
