= Moritz Baer =

German ski jumper

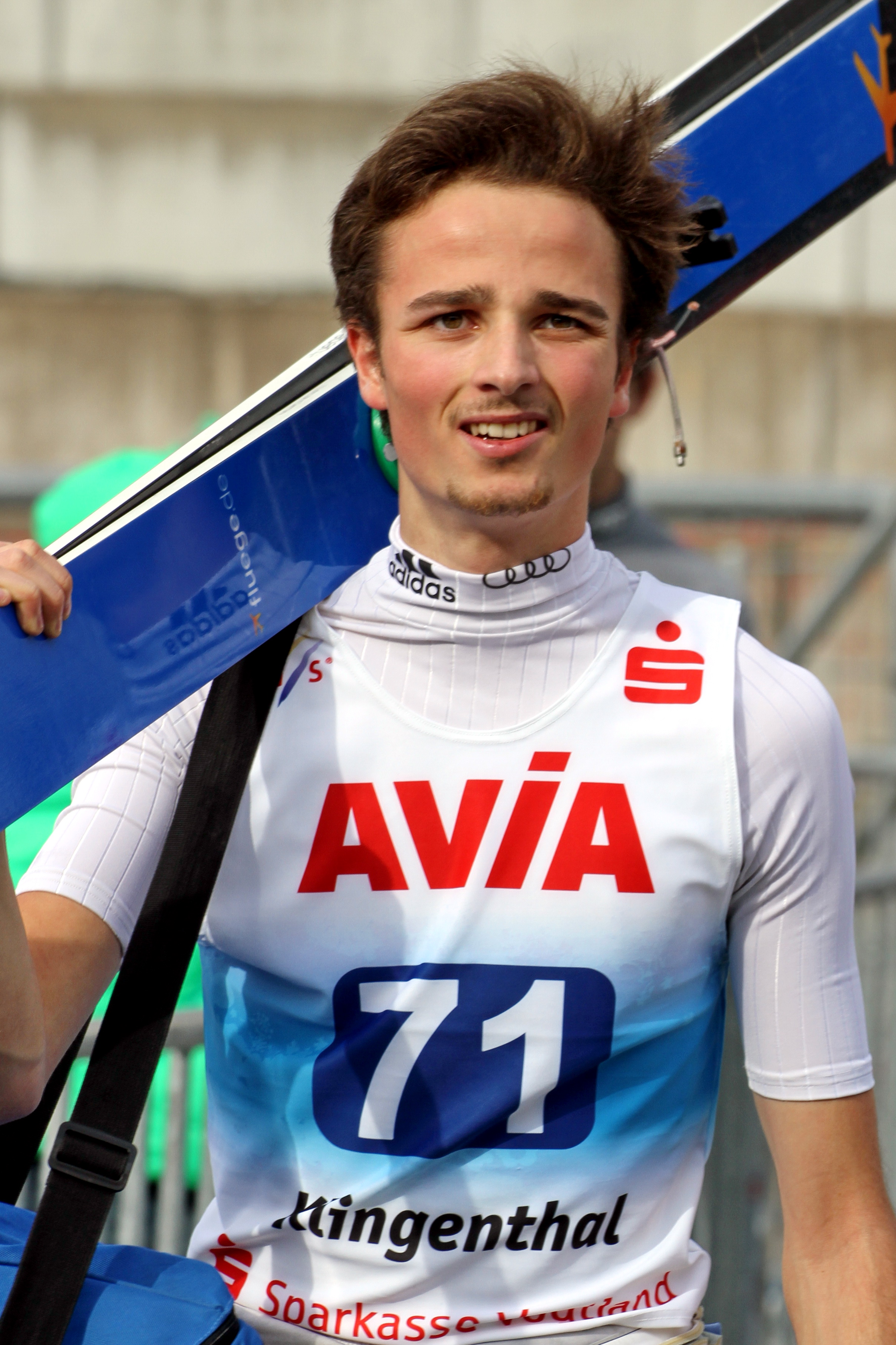

Personal information
- Nationality: Germany
- Born: 16 May 1997 (age 29) Germany
- Height: 1.77 m (5 ft 10 in)

Sport
- Sport: Skiing
- Club: SF Gmund-Dürnbach

World Cup career
- Seasons: 2013–present
- Indiv. starts: 16

Achievements and titles
- Personal bests: 211.5 m (694 ft); Oberstdorf, 17 March 2022
- Updated on 17 March 2022

Moritz Baer (born 16 May 1997) is a German former ski jumper.

He made his FIS Ski Jumping Continental Cup debut in September 2016, made his first podium in September 2018 in Midtstubakken, and won his first race in January 2019 in Klingenthal.

He made his FIS Ski Jumping World Cup debut in the 2018–19 Four Hills Tournament, finishing 44th in Oberstdorf. He collected his first World Cup points with a 29th place in January 2019 in Sapporo, and broke the top 20 for the first time when finishing 19th in Nizhny Tagil in December 2019.

He represents the sports club SF Gmund-Dürbach.
