= Johann Jakob d'Annone =

Swiss educator, scientist, and lawyer (1728–1804)

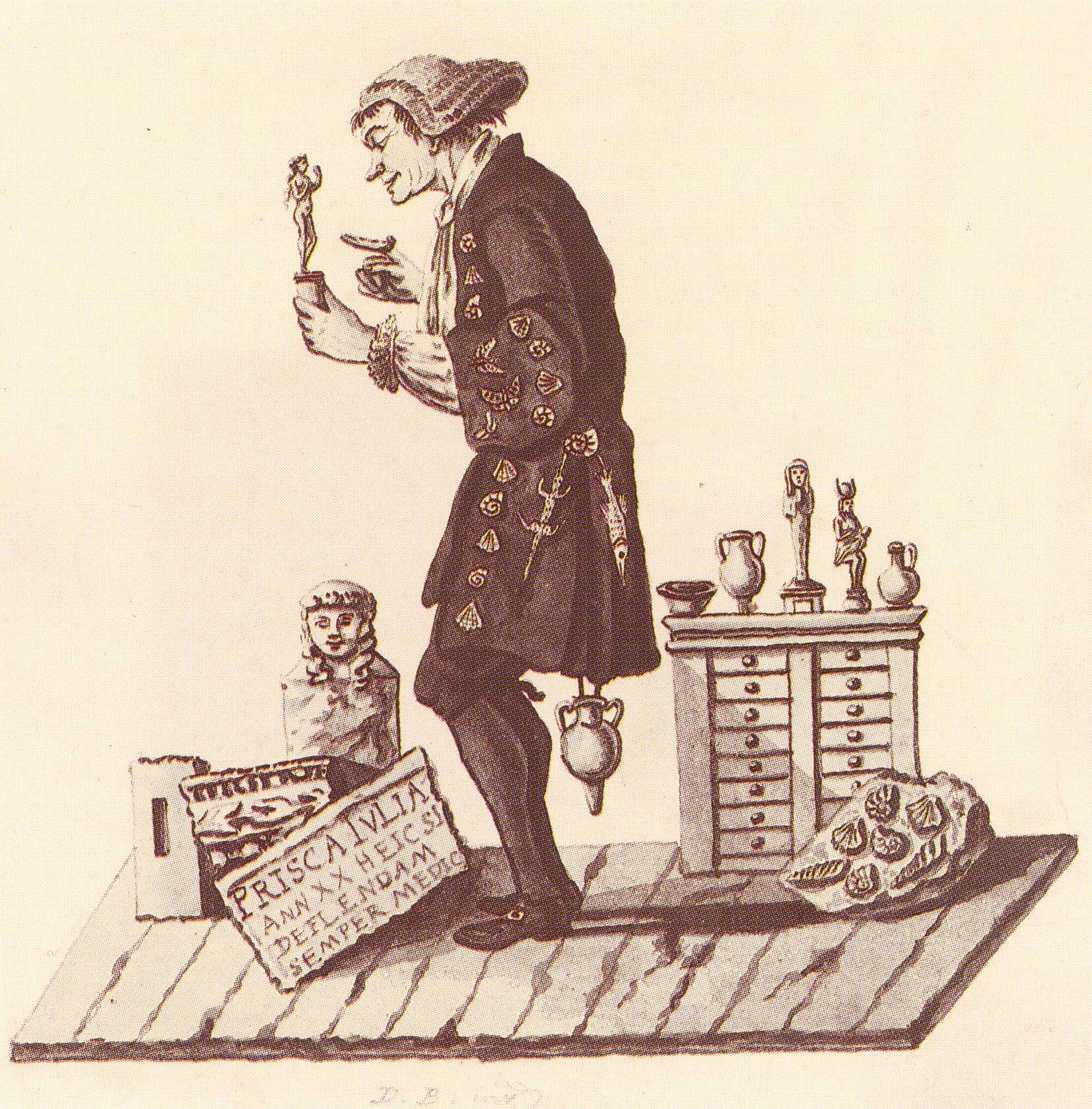
Johann Jakob d'Annone

Johann Jakob d'Annone (12 July 1728 – 18 September 1804) was a Swiss educator, scientist and lawyer. He graduated in philosophy and law from the University of Basel in 1752. After initial appointments teaching Roman law, numismatics and natural sciences (especially mineralogy) (1759–60), he was named professor of eloquence in 1766 and professor of law in 1779. D'Annone served as rector of the University of Basel in 1782–83 and 1794–95, and was elected cean of the faculty of law on eight occasions. From 1774 he acted as legal adviser to the City of Basel. He was an authority on antiquities and Roman artefacts. He also assembled important collections of fossils, minerals and coins, and founded a library of some 10,000 volumes.

== Meteorological observations ==
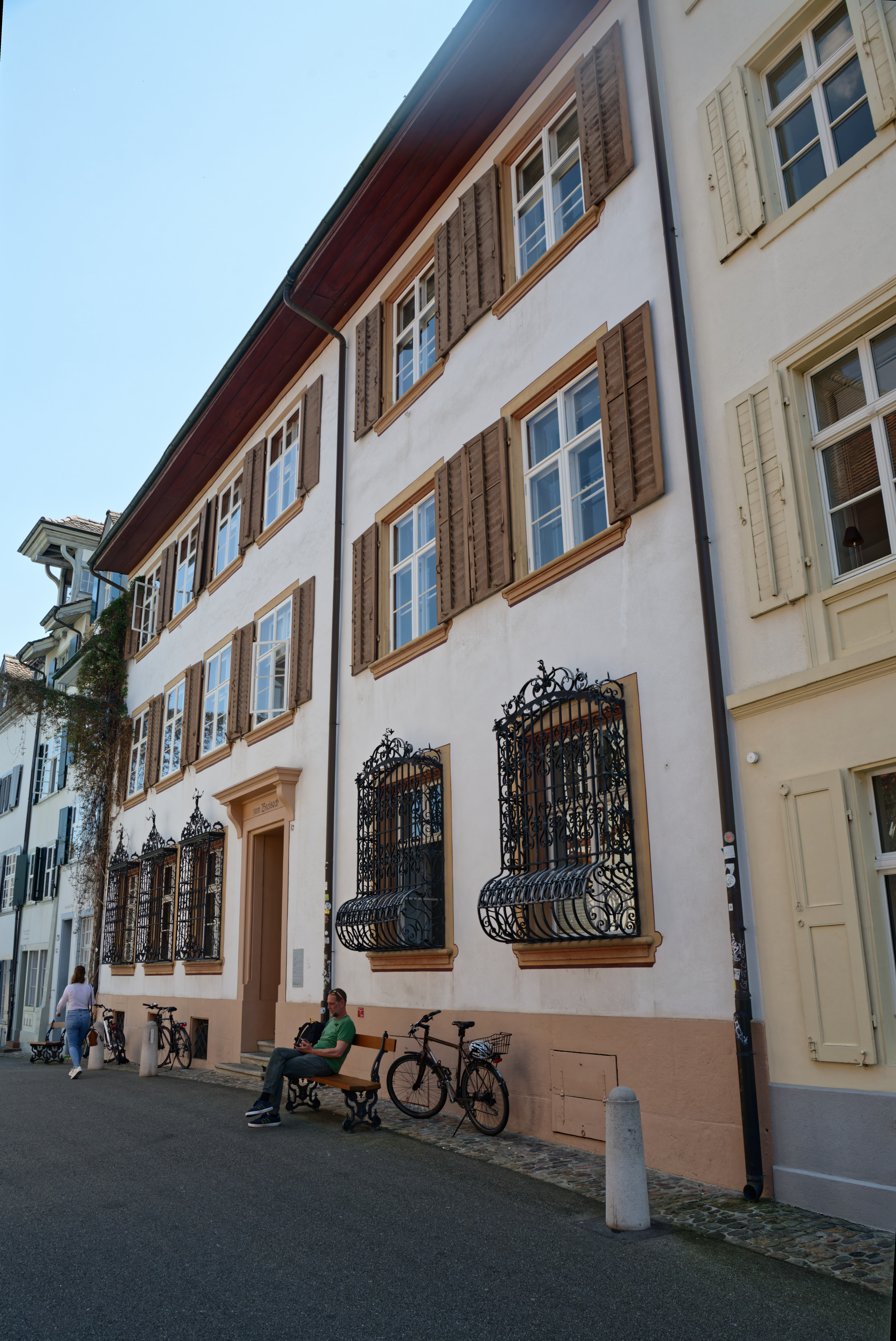
Basel: Heuberg 16

From 5 June 1755 until shortly before his death, D'Annone kept one of Switzerland's longest continuous instrumental meteorological series under his own name. Measurements were made at his residence at Heuberg 16 in Basel (280 metres asl) three times each day, originally at 07:00, 14:00 and 20:00 (Basel hours; later adjusted to 07:00, 15:00 and 19:00). During the summers of 1761, 1765 and 1784 he recorded data at nearby Muttenz and Pratteln before returning to Basel. He back-filled his series to 1 January 1755 by transcribing observations made by Friedrich Zwinger (1707–1776).

Temperature was read on a Micheli Du Crest spirit-in-glass thermometer (11 Parisian-line bulb) and atmospheric pressure with a "good barometer" calibrated in Parisian inches (1.75-line bore). His meticulous manuscript notebooks (an April 1757 folio is preserved in the University Library of Basel) provided the data later concatenated into the long Basel series used by Bider and Schüepp (1958) and modern climate reconstructions.

== Legacy ==
D’Annone's subdaily records form the first 50 years of the Basel instrumental series (1755–1804), now digitized by MeteoSwiss and incorporated into global climate databases. His work remains a cornerstone for studies of pre-industrial climate variability in Switzerland.
