= Luisa Görlich =

German ski jumper (born 1998)

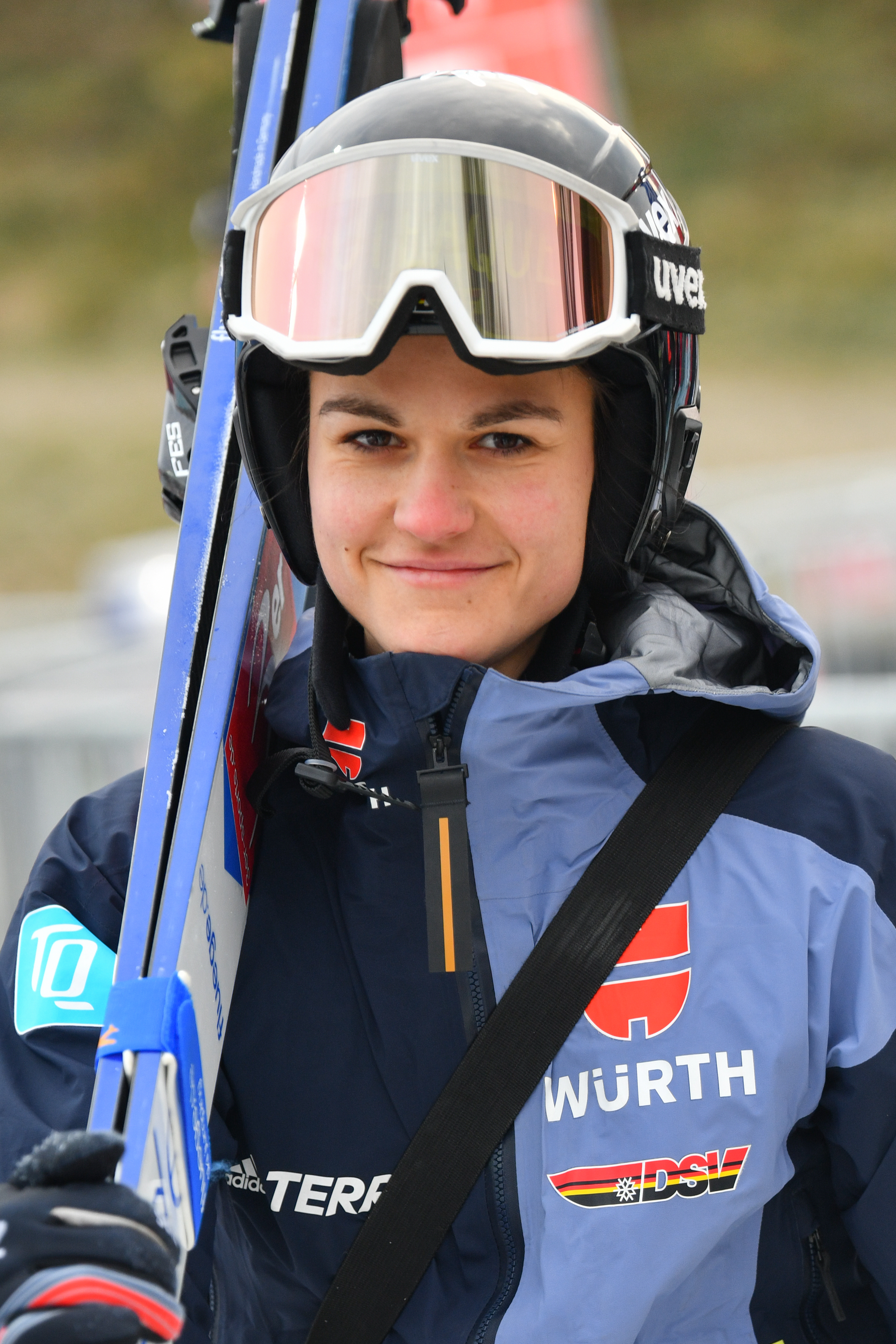
- Görlich in 2023

Personal information
- Nationality: Germany
- Born: 21 December 1998 (age 27)
- Height: 1.67 m (5 ft 6 in)

Sport
- Sport: Skiing
- Club: WSV 08 Lauscha

World Cup career
- Seasons: 2016–present
- Indiv. starts: 104
- Team starts: 4
- Team podiums: 1
Medal record
Women's ski jumping
Representing Germany
World Championships
Gold medal – first place	2023 Planica	Team NH
Junior World Championships
Gold medal – first place	Park City 2017	Team NH
Silver medal – second place	Kandersteg 2018	Mixed team NH
- Updated on 25 February 2023

Luisa Görlich (born 21 December 1998) is a German ski jumper who has competed at World Cup level since the 2015/16 season.

== Career ==
Görlich's best individual World Cup result is 13th place in Pyeongchang on 16 February 2017. In the Continental Cup, her best individual result is second in Notodden on 16–17 December 2016. At the Junior World Championships, she won a team gold medal in 2017, and a mixed team silver medal in 2018.

== World Championship results ==
Year	Normal hill	Large hill	Team NH	Mixed team
2021	–	19	5	–
2023	15	–	1	–
2025	DNS	–	1	–
