= Constantin Schmid =

German ski jumper (born 1999)

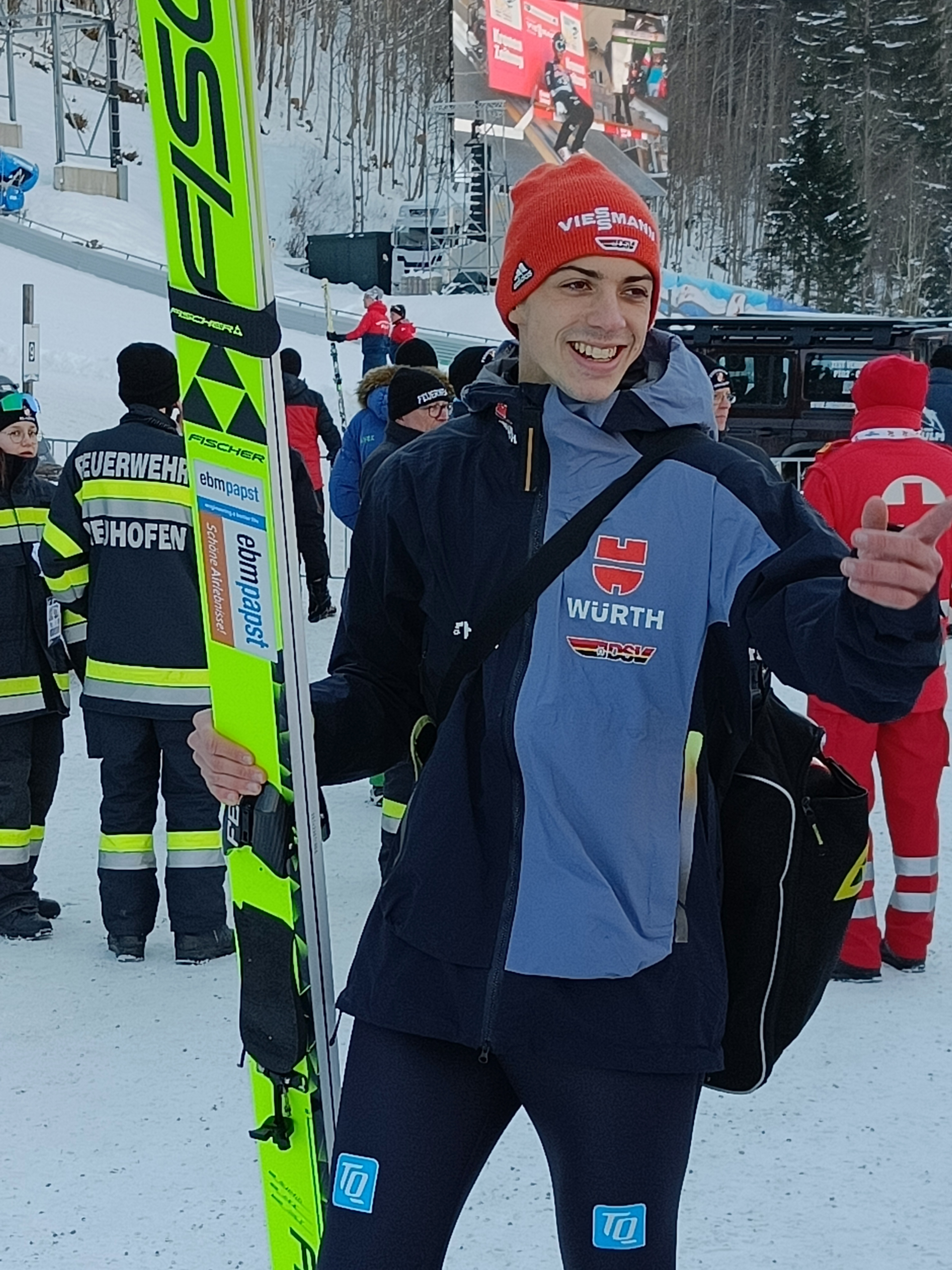
- Schmid in 2023

Personal information
- Nationality: Germany
- Born: 27 November 1999 (age 26) Oberaudorf, Germany
- Height: 1.83 m (6 ft 0 in)

Sport
- Sport: Skiing
- Club: WSV Oberaudorf

World Cup career
- Seasons: 2016–present
- Indiv. starts: 129
- Indiv. podiums: 1
- Indiv. wins: 0
- Team starts: 13
- Team podiums: 9
- Team wins: 3

Achievements and titles
- Personal bests: 234.0 m (767.7 ft); Planica, 21 March 2019
Medal record
Representing Germany
Men's ski jumping
Olympic Games
Bronze medal – third place	2022 Beijing	Team LH
Men's ski flying
Ski Flying World Championships
Silver medal – second place	2020 Planica	Team

Constantin Schmid (born 27 November 1999) is a German ski jumper. He is the team bronze medalist at the 2022 Winter Olympics and the silver medalist at the 2020 Ski Flying World Championships.

Schmid made his World Cup debut in Oberstdorf in December 2016. His best individual World Cup finish is a third place from Râșnov from February 2020. He also has five podiums with the German team, including one win.

He is the older brother of Emanuel Schmid, also a ski jumper.

== Record ==
=== FIS World Nordic Ski Championships ===
Event	Normal hill	Large hill	Team LH	Mixed Team NH
(Germany) 2021 Oberstdorf	23			
(Slovenia) 2023 Planica	7	17	5	

=== FIS Ski Flying World Championships ===
Event	Individual	Team
(Slovenia) 2020 Planica	14	2nd place, silver medalist(s)
(Norway) 2022 Vikersund	17	

== World Cup ==
=== Season standings ===
Season				Tour Standings			
Season	Overall	4H	SF	RA	W5	T5	P7
2016–17	—	51	—	—	N/A	N/A	N/A
2017–18	33	18	—	71	—	N/A	—
2018–19	38	23	32	15	31	N/A	24
2019–20	16	16	23	14	19	7	N/A
2020–21	26	35				N/A	

=== Team victories ===
	Day	Year	Location	Hill	Point K	HS	Jump 1	Jump 2	Note (points)
1.	25 January	2020	Zakopane	Wielka Krokiew	K-125	HS-140	123,0 m	136,5 m	1182.2 (275.6)
2.	29 February	2020	Lahti	Salpausselkä	K-116	HS-130	127,5 m	112,0 m	984.1 (233.8)

=== Individual starts ===
Season	1	2	3	4	5	6	7	8	9	10	11	12	13	14	15	16	17	18	19	20	21	22	23	24	25	26	27	28	29	30	31	Points
2016–17	Kuusamo	Kuusamo	Klingenthal	Lillehammer	Lillehammer	Engelberg	Engelberg	Oberstdorf	Garmisch-Partenkirchen	Innsbruck	Bischofshofen	Wisła	Wisła	Zakopane	Willingen	Oberstdorf	Oberstdorf	Sapporo	Sapporo	Pyeongchang	Pyeongchang	Oslo	Trondheim	Vikersund	Planica	Planica						0
2016–17	–	–	–	–	–	–	–	47	49	–	–	–	–	–	–	–	–	–	–	–	–	–	–	–	–	–						0
2017–18	Wisła	Kuusamo	Nizhny Tagil	Nizhny Tagil	Titisee-Neustadt	Engelberg	Engelberg	Oberstdorf	Garmisch-Partenkirchen	Innsbruck	Bischofshofen	Tauplitz	Zakopane	Willingen	Willingen	Lahti	Oslo	Lillehammer	Trondheim	Vikersund	Planica	Planica										81
2017–18	–	–	–	–	8	33	q	28	24	26	15	–	17	–	–	27	35	–	–	–	–	–										81
2018–19	Wisła	Kuusamo	Kuusamo	Nizhny Tagil	Nizhny Tagil	Engelberg	Engelberg	Oberstdorf	Garmisch-Partenkirchen	Innsbruck	Bischofshofen	Val di Fiemme	Val di Fiemme	Zakopane	Sapporo	Sapporo	Oberstdorf	Oberstdorf	Oberstdorf	Lahti	Willingen	Willingen	Oslo	Lillehammer	Trondheim	Vikersund	Planica	Planica				86
2018–19	–	–	–	–	–	–	–	24	29	33	19	–	–	15	–	–	31	33	q	33	34	21	21	28	24	20	23	–				86
2019–20	Wisła	Kuusamo	Nizhny Tagil	Nizhny Tagil	Klingenthal	Engelberg	Engelberg	Oberstdorf	Garmisch-Partenkirchen	Innsbruck	Bischofshofen	Val di Fiemme	Val di Fiemme	Titisee-Neustadt	Titisee-Neustadt	Zakopane	Sapporo	Sapporo	Willingen	Tauplitz	Tauplitz	Râșnov	Râșnov	Lahti	Lahti	Lillehammer	Lillehammer					530
2019–20	31	25	23	7	26	11	48	20	7	26	20	5	34	5	9	11	12	27	21	13	36	15	3	11	4	16	11					530
2020–21	Wisła	Ruka	Ruka	Nizhny Tagil	Nizhny Tagil	Engelberg	Engelberg	Oberstdorf	Garmisch-Partenkirchen	Innsbruck	Bischofshofen	Titisee-Neustadt	Titisee-Neustadt	Zakopane	Lahti	Willingen	Willingen	Klingenthal	Klingenthal			Râșnov	Oslo	Lillehammer	Trondheim	Vikersund	Planica	Planica				94
2020–21	42	16	12	38	7	28	41	36	47	39	18	26	32																			94

=== Podiums ===
Season	Podiums			
Season	Medals			Total
Season	1st place, gold medalist(s)	2nd place, silver medalist(s)	3rd place, bronze medalist(s)	
2016–17	-	-	-	-
2017–18	-	-	-	-
2018–19	-	-	-	-
2019–20	-	-	1	1
2020–21	-	-	-	-
Total	-	-	1	1
