= Schanzen Einsiedeln =

Coordinates: 47°08′12″N 8°44′14″E

Nationale Sprunganlage / Schanzen Einsiedeln Andreas Küttel Schanze
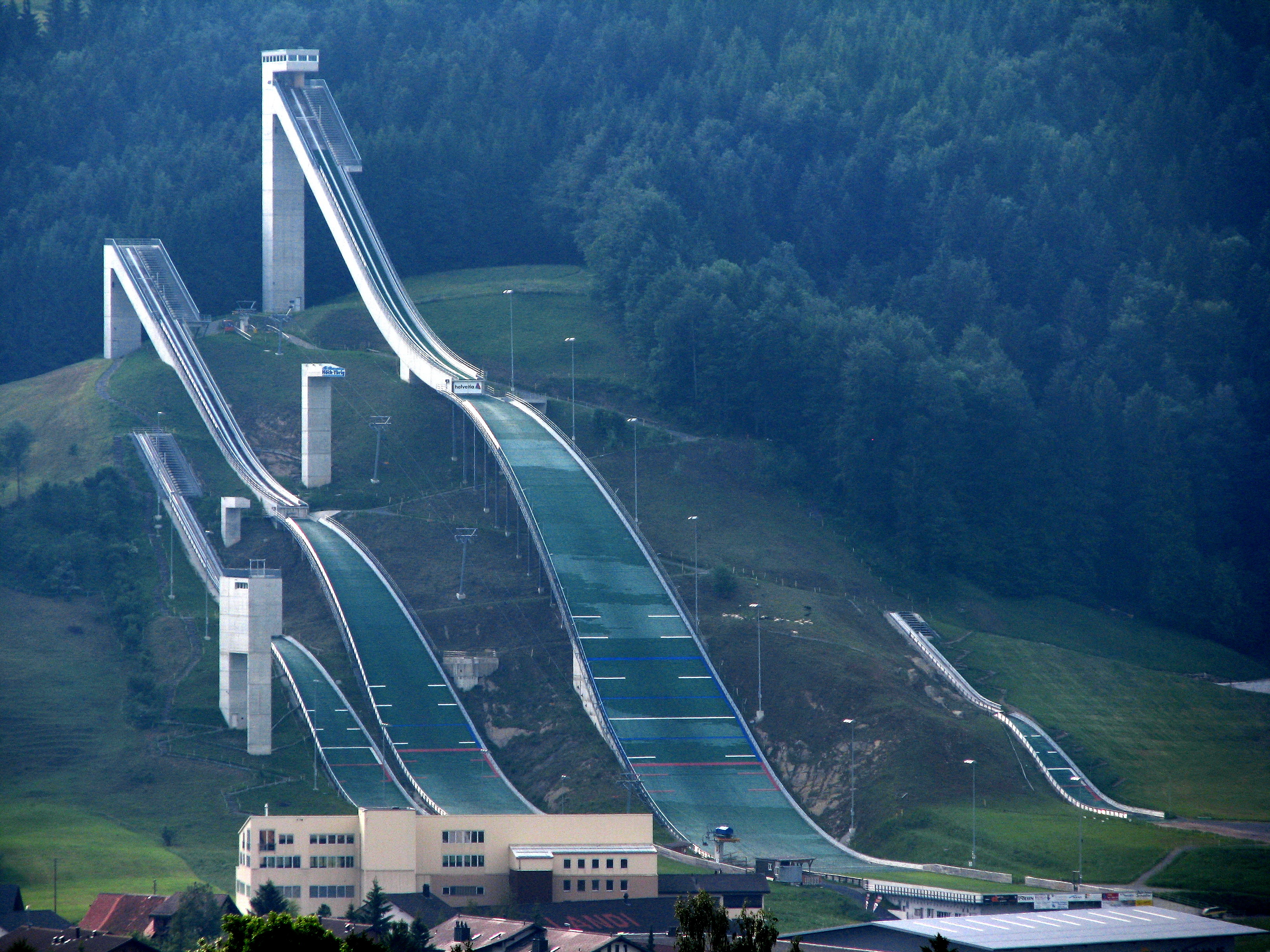
- Location: Einsiedeln; Switzerland
- Operator: Sc Einsiedeln
- Opened: 2005

Size
- K–point: 105 m
- Hill size: 117 m
- Hill record: (Austria) 121.0 m - Gregor Schlierenzauer (2008)
- Other jumps: K-70, K-45, K-25

The ski jumping venue in Eschbach, Einsiedeln, was built in 2001. In 2010 the venue became the Nationale Sprunganlage (National Ski jumping venue) of Switzerland. The venue includes four hills, K-105, K-70, K-45 and K-25. Schanzen Einsiedeln is located in Eschbach Sports Centrum and many other events take place in this area.

== 2001 ==
In 2001 the first ski jumping hill in Eschbach was built. It was only a small K-20 hill, and it was torn down after three years of use.

== New hills ==
2003 saw the start date of the construction of four new ultra-modern ski jumping hills in Eschbach. After two years of construction the facility was opened for use. The ski jump hills were installed with green summer plastic coverings that are substitutes for snow. These allow skiers to train in the summer time. While building the hill, many members of Einsiedeln Ski club helped the workers with the construction for example placing the plastic mattings on all four hills. In July 2005 the new facility with a new ski lift and an artificial snow machine was opened after only two years of construction time. In the summer of 2005 the 12 million Swiss franc project hosted Continental Cup and World Cup Grand Prix ski jumping competitions.

The Einsiedeln now hosts the World Cup of ski jumping the Summer Grand Prix competitions in both Ski jumping and Nordic combined every year.

After opening in 2005 the four ski jumps had the sponsored names of AKAD-schanze (K-105), Swisscom-, große and kleine KPT-Schanze. But then in the spring of 2009 the name of the AKAD-schanze (K-105) was changed too Andreas Küttel-Schanze, to honor ski jumper Andreas Küttel who was born in Einsiedeln. The smaller K-70 hill also had its name changed to Simon Ammann-Schanze.

== Hill records ==
The hill records at Schanzen Einsiedeln, as of May 15, 2010 are:

=== K105 ===
- 2005-08-13: 116,0 m - Thomas Morgenstern, Austria
- 2006-09-10: 119,0 m - Tobias Bogner, Germany
- 2008-08-01: 120,5 m - Anssi Koivuranta, Finland
- 2008-08-01: 121,0 m - Gregor Schlierenzauer, Austria

=== K70 ===
- 2008-08-01: 79,5 m - Klemens Murańka, Poland

=== K45 ===
- 2005-10-16: 50,0 m - Andreas Schuler, Switzerland

=== K25 ===
- 2006-02-25: 22,5 m - Pascal Kälin, Switzerland
