= Adler Ski Stadium =

Ski jumping venue in Hinterzarten, Germany

Coordinates: 47.8992°N 8.1108°E

Adler Ski Stadium Adler-Skistadion
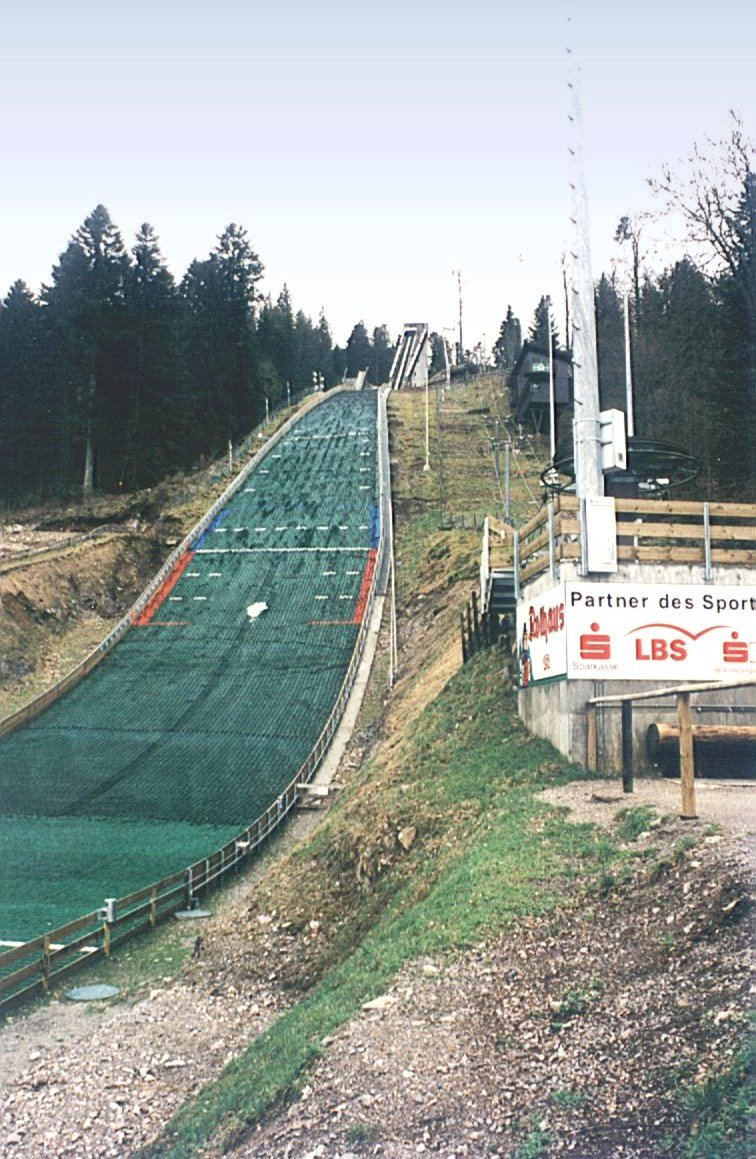
- The Adler Jump
- Location: Hinterzarten; Germany
- Opened: 1924
- Renovated: 1935, 1965, 1982, 1998/99

Size
- K–point: K-95
- Hill size: HS 108
- Hill record: 112 m (367 ft) (Japan) Noriaki Kasai

The Adler Ski Stadium (German: Adler-Skistadion) is a ski jumping complex in Hinterzarten, Germany.

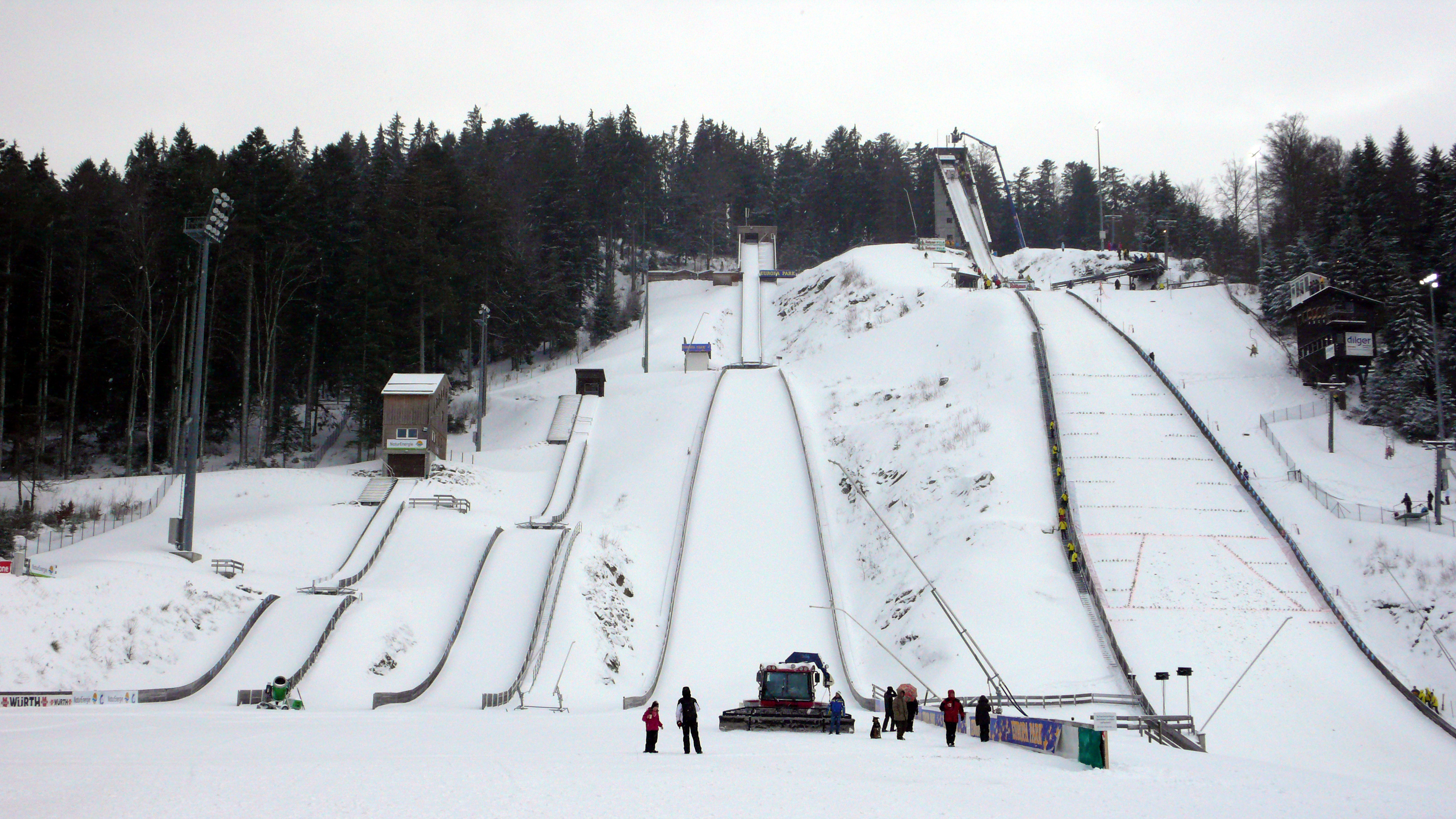
All the jumps (K-15, K-30, K-70 and K-95)

== History ==
It was opened in 1924 and owned by SC Hinterzarten. It hosted four FIS Ski jumping World Cup events for ladies. This jump was the first and now the regular host of Summer Grand Prix. Noriaki Kasai holds the hill record.

The first ever women's World Cup team competition was held here on 16 December 2017. The Japanese team won the ski jump. The team were Kaori Iwabuchi, Sara Takanashi, Yuka Seto and Yuki Ito.

== Other jumps ==
- Energiedienst-Schanze: K-15
- Schülerschanze: K-30
- Europa-Park-Schanze: K-70
