= List of medalists of the FIS Nordic Junior World Ski Championships in ski jumping =

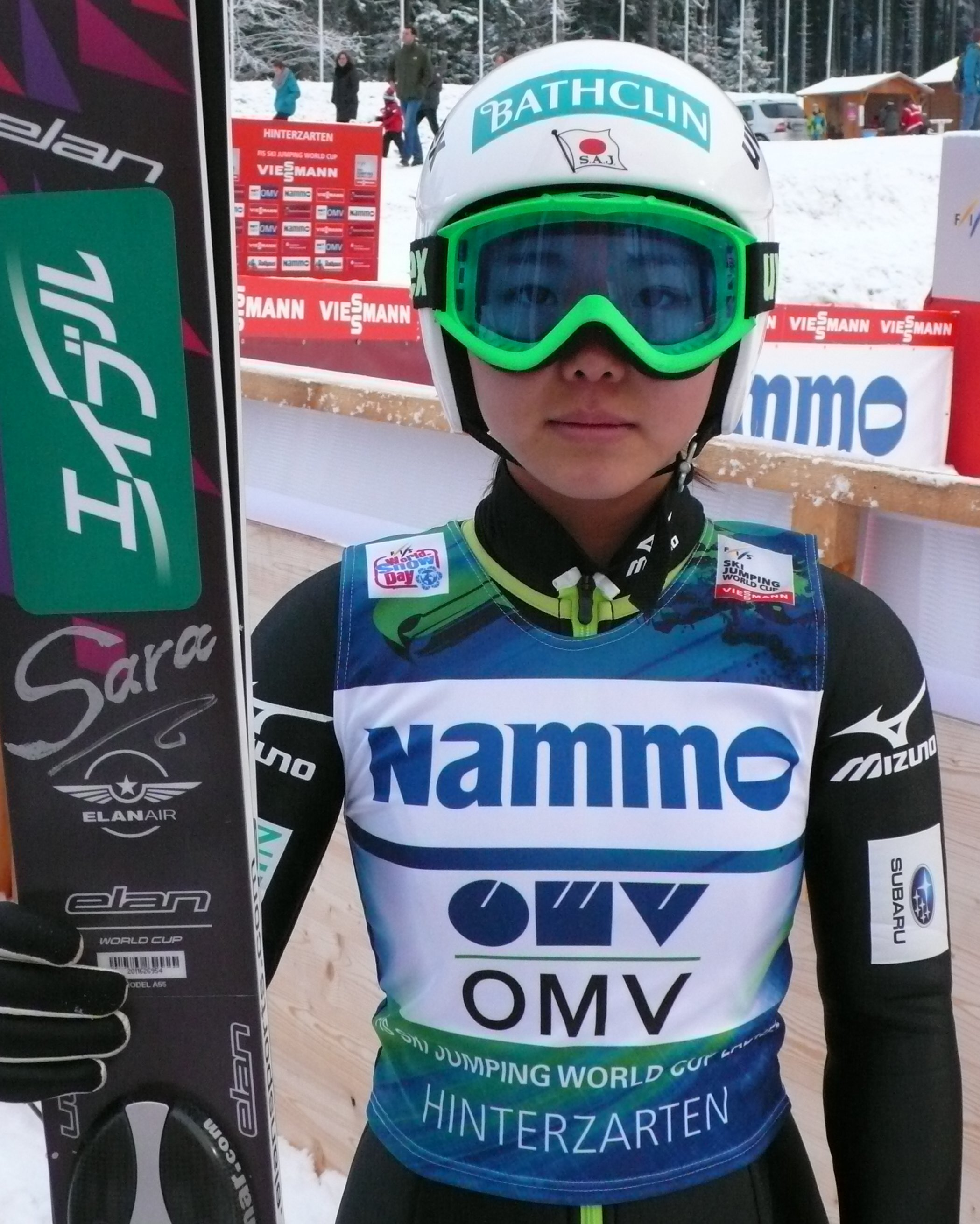
Sara Takanashi – five-time gold medalist at the FIS Nordic Junior World Ski Championships

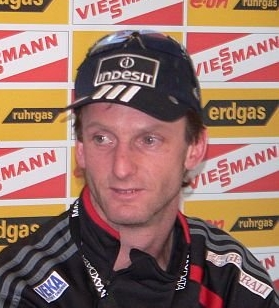
Heinz Kuttin – five-time gold medalist at the FIS Nordic Junior World Ski Championships

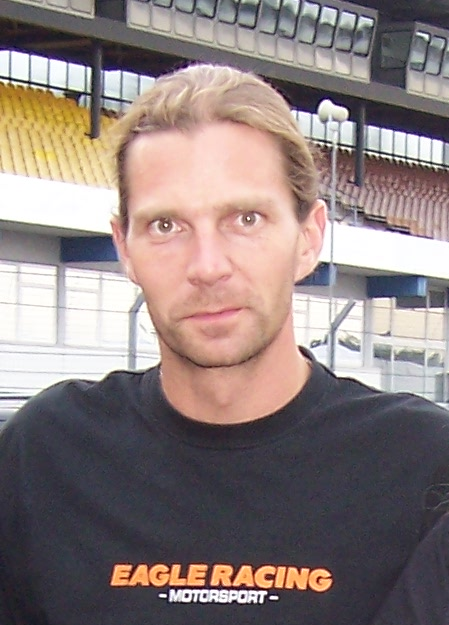
Janne Ahonen – four-time gold medalist at the FIS Nordic Junior World Ski Championships

The list of medalists of the FIS Nordic Junior World Ski Championships in ski jumping is a compilation of athletes and teams who have won at least one medal in ski jumping events at the FIS Nordic Junior World Ski Championships.

== History ==
The first FIS Nordic Junior World Ski Championships in ski jumping took place in 1977 in Sainte-Croix, Switzerland. Prior to this, from 1968 to 1976 and in 1978, the European Junior Ski Championships served as a precursor to the world championships. During these European events, Toni Innauer was the only athlete to secure two gold medals, winning in 1975 and 1976.

Until 1985, the championships featured only a men's individual ski jumping event. In 1986, a team competition was introduced. In 1998, a women's competition was held, but it was unofficial. Women's individual events officially joined the championship program in 2006. A women's team event was planned for 2011 but was canceled; it was successfully held in 2012. In 2016, a mixed team event, consisting of two men and two women, was added to the program.

== Record holders ==
The first Junior World Champion was Pavel Fízek, who won the 1977 individual event. Among men, Stephan Embacher holds the record for the most gold medals, with six golds and a total of seven medals from 2023 to 2025. Heinz Kuttin won five gold medals between 1988 and 1990, while Janne Ahonen (1993–1994), Michael Hayböck (2009–2011), and Daniel Tschofenig (2021–2022) each secured four gold medals. Among women, Sara Takanashi is the most decorated, with five gold medals from 2012 to 2014. Ema Klinec earned six medals (three gold, two silver, one bronze) from 2012 to 2017, and Coline Mattel also won six medals (one gold, three silver, two bronze) from 2009 to 2013.

Sara Takanashi is the only athlete to win three individual titles (2012–2014). Heinz Kuttin (1988, 1990), Janne Ahonen (1993, 1994), and Stephan Embacher (2024, 2025) each won two individual gold medals.

== Men ==
=== Individual ===
The following table lists all medalists in men's individual ski jumping events from 1977 and 1979 to 2025. Medalists from the European Junior Championships, considered a separate event, are not included.

Three athletes have won two individual titles. Heinz Kuttin won in 1988 and 1990, followed by Janne Ahonen, who won in 1993 and 1994, becoming the first to defend his title. Stephan Embacher won in 2024 and 2025, making him the second to defend the individual title.

The individual competition in 2000 at Štrbské Pleso was canceled.

Year and location	K/HS	Gold	Silver	Bronze	Sources
1977, Sainte-Croix	K-87	Pavel Fízek	Matthias Buse	Hubert Neuper	
1979, Mont-Sainte-Anne	K-89	Horst Bulau	Ulrich Pscherra	Hiroyasu Aizawa	
1980, Örnsköldsvik	K-70	Steve Collins	Vladimir Boyarintsev	Andreas Felder	
1981, Schonach im Schwarzwald	K-80	Matti Nykänen	Ernst Vettori	Steve Collins	
1982, Murau	K-70	Ernst Vettori	Markku Pusenius	Bernhard Zauner	
1983, Kuopio	K-80	Franz Wiegele	Ole Christian Eidhammer	Tuomo Ylipulli	
1984, Trondheim	K-78	Martin Švagerko	Janez Štirn	Miroslav Polák	
1985, Täsch	K-77	Werner Haim	Juha Karjalainen	Günther Stranner	
1986, Lake Placid	K-86	Virginio Lunardi	Christian Rimmel	Clas Brede Bråthen	
1987, Asiago	K-92	Ari-Pekka Nikkola	Mike Arnold	Dieter Thoma	
1988, Saalfelden	K-85	Heinz Kuttin	Staffan Tällberg	Markus Steiner	
1989, Hamar	K-84	Kent Johanssen	Andreas Rauschmeier	Staffan Tällberg	
1990, Štrbské Pleso	K-88	Heinz Kuttin	Roberto Cecon	Tomáš Raszka	
1991, Reit im Winkl	K-90	Martin Höllwarth	Tomáš Goder	Damjan Fras	
1992, Vuokatti	K-81	Toni Nieminen	Sylvain Freiholz	Martin Höllwarth	
1993, Harrachov	K-90	Janne Ahonen	Andreas Widhölzl	Alexander Herr	
1994, Breitenwang	K-85	Janne Ahonen	Nicolas Dessum	Zbyněk Krompolc	
1995, Gällivare	K-90	Tommy Ingebrigtsen	Reinhard Schwarzenberger	Lucas Chevalier-Girod	
1996, Asiago	K-92	Michael Uhrmann	Primož Peterka	Andreas Küttel	
1997, Calgary	K-89	Wilhelm Brenna	Jussi Hautamäki	Falko Krismayr	
1998, Sankt Moritz	K-95	Wolfgang Loitzl	Kazuhiro Nakamura	Matti Hautamäki	
1999, Saalfelden	K-85	Kazuki Nishishita	Michal Pšenko	Stefan Kaiser	
2001, Karpacz	K-85	Veli-Matti Lindström	Manuel Fettner	Florian Liegl	
2002, Schonach	K-90	Janne Happonen	Daiki Ito	Kalle Keituri	
2003, Sollefteå	K-107	Thomas Morgenstern	Rok Benkovič	Jan Mazoch	
2004, Stryn	K-90	Mateusz Rutkowski	Thomas Morgenstern	Olli Pekkala	
2005, Rovaniemi	K-90; HS 100	Joonas Ikonen	Arthur Pauli	Jurij Tepeš	
2006, Kranj	K-100; HS 109	Gregor Schlierenzauer	Jurij Tepeš	Andrea Morassi	
2007, Planica	K-90; HS 100	Roman Koudelka	Shōhei Tochimoto	Thomas Thurnbichler	
2008, Zakopane	K-85; HS 94	Andreas Wank	Shōhei Tochimoto	Andreas Strolz	
2009, Štrbské Pleso	K-90; HS 100	Lukas Müller	Maciej Kot	Ville Larinto	
2010, Hinterzarten	K-95; HS 106	Michael Hayböck	Peter Prevc	Diego Dellasega	
2011, Otepää	K-90; HS 100	Vladimir Zografski	Stefan Kraft	Kaarel Nurmsalu	
2012, Erzurum	K-95; HS 109	Nejc Dežman	Jaka Hvala; Aleksander Zniszczoł	–	
2013, Liberec	K-90; HS 100	Jaka Hvala	Klemens Murańka	Stefan Kraft	
2014, Predazzo	K-90; HS 106	Jakub Wolny	Patrick Streitler	Evgenii Klimov	
2015, Almaty	K-95; HS 106	Johann André Forfang	Andreas Wellinger	Phillip Sjøen	
2016, Râșnov	K-90; HS 100	David Siegel	Domen Prevc	Ryōyū Kobayashi	
2017, Park City	K-90; HS 100	Viktor Polášek	Alex Insam	Constantin Schmid	
2018, Kandersteg	K-90; HS 106	Marius Lindvik	Constantin Schmid	Clemens Leitner	
2019, Lahti	K-90; HS 100	Thomas Aasen Markeng	Luca Roth	Sergey Tkachenko	
2020, Oberwiesenthal	K-95; HS 105	Peter Resinger	Sander Vossan Eriksen	Mark Hafnar	
2021, Lahti	K-90; HS 100	Niklas Bachlinger	David Haagen	Dominik Peter	
2022, Zakopane	K-95; HS 105	Daniel Tschofenig	David Haagen	Markus Müller	
2023, Whistler	K-95; HS 104	Vilho Palosaari	Jonas Schuster	Jan Habdas	
2024, Planica	K-95; HS 102	Stephan Embacher	Erik Belshaw	Adrian Tittel	
2025, Lake Placid	K-95; HS 100	Stephan Embacher	Tate Frantz	Simon Steinberger	

=== Team ===
The table below lists the rosters of all teams that have reached the podium in the Junior World Ski Championships from 1986 to 2025.

Year and venue	K/HS	Gold	Silver	Bronze	Sources
1986, Lake Placid	K-86	West Germany	Italy	Soviet Union	
1987, Asiago	K-92	East Germany	West Germany	Finland	
1988, Saalfelden	K-85	Austria	Norway	Czechoslovakia	
1989, Hamar	K-84	Austria	Yugoslavia	Norway	
1990, Štrbské Pleso	K-88	Austria	Finland	Yugoslavia	
1991, Reit im Winkl	K-90	Czechoslovakia	Finland	France	
1992, Vuokatti	K-81	Finland	Norway	Germany	
1993, Harrachov	K-90	Finland	Austria	Germany	
1994, Breitenwang	K-85	Finland	Czech Republic	Austria	
1995, Gällivare	K-90	Germany	Austria	Japan	
1996, Asiago	K-92	Germany	Austria	Slovenia	
1997, Calgary	K-89	Slovenia	Finland	Austria	
1998, St. Moritz	K-95	Germany	Japan	Finland	
1999, Saalfelden	K-85	Austria	Finland	Germany	
2000, Štrbské Pleso	K-90	Austria	Norway	Finland	
2001, Karpacz	K-85	Finland	Austria	Germany	
2002, Schonach	K-90	Finland	Austria	Slovenia	
2003, Sollefteå	K-107	Austria	Slovenia	Finland	
2004, Stryn	K-90	Austria	Poland	Germany	
2005, Rovaniemi	K-90 HS 100	Slovenia	Poland	Finland	
2006, Kranj	K-100 HS 109	Austria	Slovenia	Japan	
2007, Planica	K-90 HS 100	Slovenia	Japan	Finland	
2008, Zakopane	K-85 HS 94	Germany	Austria	Poland	
2009, Štrbské Pleso	K-90 HS 100	Austria	Germany	Poland	
2010, Hinterzarten	K-95 HS 106	Austria	Germany	Slovenia	
2011, Otepää	K-90 HS 100	Austria	Germany	Norway	
2012, Erzurum	K-95 HS 109	Norway	Poland	Austria	
2013, Liberec	K-90 HS 100	Slovenia	Poland	Germany	
2014, Predazzo	K-90 HS 106	Poland	Austria	Norway	
2015, Almaty	K-95 HS 106	Norway	Germany	Austria	
2016, Râșnov	K-90 HS 100	Germany	Norway	Japan	
2017, Park City	K-90 HS 100	Slovenia	Germany	Austria	
2018, Kandersteg	K-90 HS 106	Germany	Austria	Norway	
2019, Lahti	K-90 HS 100	Germany	Norway	Slovenia	
2020, Oberwiesenthal	K-95 HS 105	Slovenia	Austria	Germany	
2021, Lahti	K-90 HS 100	Austria	Slovenia	Russia	
2022, Zakopane	K-95 HS 105	Austria	Norway	Germany	
2023, Whistler	K-95 HS 104	Austria	Poland	Slovenia	
2024, Planica	K-95 HS 102	Austria	Germany	Poland	
2025, Lake Placid	K-90 HS 100	Austria	Slovenia	Russia	

== Women ==
=== Individual ===
In 1998, an unofficial Junior World Championship for women was held, with Heli Pomell taking first place, followed by Eva Ganster and Michaela Schmidt.

The table below lists the athletes who won medals at the Junior World Championships from 2006 to 2025.

Year and venue	K/HS	Gold	Silver	Bronze	Sources
2006, Kranj	K-100; HS 109	Juliane Seyfarth	Atsuko Tanaka	Elena Runggaldier	
2007, Planica	K-90; HS 100	Lisa Demetz	Katie Willis	Maja Vtič	
2008, Zakopane	K-85; HS 94	Jacqueline Seifriedsberger	Elena Runggaldier	Katja Požun	
2009, Štrbské Pleso	K-90; HS 100	Magdalena Schnurr	Anna Häfele	Coline Mattel	
2010, Hinterzarten	K-95; HS 106	Elena Runggaldier	Coline Mattel	Sarah Hendrickson	
2011, Otepää	K-90; HS 100	Coline Mattel	Špela Rogelj	Yuki Ito	
2012, Erzurum	K-95; HS 109	Sara Takanashi	Sarah Hendrickson	Carina Vogt	
2013, Liberec	K-90; HS 100	Sara Takanashi	Evelyn Insam	Katja Požun	
2014, Predazzo	K-90; HS 106	Sara Takanashi	Coline Mattel	Maren Lundby	
2015, Almaty	K-95; HS 106	Sofia Tikhonova	Elisabeth Raudaschl	Chiara Kreuzer	
2016, Râșnov	K-90; HS 100	Chiara Kreuzer	Katharina Schmid	Sofia Tikhonova	
2017, Park City	K-90; HS 100	Manuela Malsiner	Ema Klinec	Nika Vodan	
2018, Kandersteg	K-90; HS 106	Nika Vodan	Ema Klinec	Anna Odine Strøm	
2019, Lahti	K-90; HS 100	Anna Shpyneva	Lidiia Iakovleva	Lara Malsiner	
2020, Oberwiesenthal	K-95; HS 105	Marita Kramer	Thea Minyan Bjørseth	Lara Malsiner	
2021, Lahti	K-90; HS 100	Thea Minyan Bjørseth	Joséphine Pagnier	Jerneja Brecl	
2022, Zakopane	K-95; HS 105	Nika Prevc	Taja Bodlaj	Alexandria Loutitt	
2023, Whistler	K-95; HS 104	Alexandria Loutitt	Nika Prevc	Julia Mühlbacher	
2024, Planica	K-95; HS 102	Tina Erzar	Julia Mühlbacher	Taja Bodlaj	
2025, Lake Placid	K-90; HS 100	Ingvild Synnøve Midtskogen	Indrid Låte	Taja Bodlaj	

=== Team ===
Women's team competitions were first included in the FIS Nordic Junior World Ski Championships schedule in 2011 in Otepää. However, the event was cancelled due to excessively strong winds.

Year and venue	K/HS	Gold	Silver	Bronze	Sources
2012, Erzurum	K-95 HS 109	Japan	Germany	Slovenia	
2013, Liberec	K-90 HS 100	Slovenia	France	Germany	
2014, Predazzo	K-90 HS 106	Japan	Slovenia	France	
2015, Almaty	K-95 HS 106	Germany	Russia	Japan	
2017, Park City	K-90 HS 100	Germany	Slovenia	Austria	
2018, Kandersteg	K-90 HS 106	Slovenia	Russia	France	
2019, Lahti	K-90 HS 100	Russia	Germany	Austria	
2020, Oberwiesenthal	K-95 HS 105	Austria	Slovenia	Germany	
2021, Lahti	K-90 HS 100	Austria	Russia	Slovenia	
2022, Zakopane	K-95 HS 105	Slovenia	Japan	Germany	
2023, Whistler	K-95 HS 104	Japan	Slovenia	Germany	
2024, Planica	K-95 HS 102	Slovenia	Japan	Germany	
2025, Lake Placid	K-90 HS 100	Germany	Slovenia	Japan	

== Mixed teams ==
Year and venue	K/HS	Gold	Silver	Bronze	Sources
2016, Râșnov	K-90 HS 100	Slovenia	Austria	Germany	
2017, Park City	K-90 HS 100	Slovenia	Germany	Japan	
2018, Kandersteg	K-90 HS 106	Norway	Germany	Austria	
2019, Lahti	K-90 HS 100	Russia	Norway	Germany	
2020, Oberwiesenthal	K-95 HS 105	Austria	Norway	Slovenia	
2022, Zakopane	K-95 HS 105	Austria	Slovenia	Norway	
2023, Whistler	K-95 HS 104	Slovenia	Japan	Germany	
2024, Planica	K-95 HS 102	Austria	Slovenia	Germany	
2025, Lake Placid	K-90 HS 100	Slovenia	United States	Austria	
