= 2012–13 FIS Ski Jumping World Cup =

Ski jumping championship season

Discipline	Men	Women
Overall	(Austria) Gregor Schlierenzauer	(Japan) Sara Takanashi
Nations Cup	Norway	United States
Ski flying	(Austria) Gregor Schlierenzauer	—
Four Hills Tournament	(Austria) Gregor Schlierenzauer	—
FIS Team Tour	Norway	—

Competition
Edition	34th	2nd
Locations	20	10
Individual	27	16
Team	6	—
Mixed	1	1
Cancelled	1	1
Rescheduled	1	0

The 2012–13 FIS Ski Jumping World Cup was the 34th World Cup season in ski jumping for men, the 16th official World Cup season in ski flying and the 2nd World Cup season for women.

Season began on 23 November 2012 in Lillehammer, Norway and ended on 24 March 2013 in Planica, Slovenia. Women's World Cup began on 24 November 2012 in Lillehammer, Norway and ended on 17 March 2013 in Oslo, Norway.

Austrian ski jumper Gregor Schlierenzauer won the overall World Cup, the ski flying title and the Four Hills Tournament. Nations Cup and the FIS Team Tour was taken by Team of Norway.

27 men's individual events on 20 different venues in 9 countries and 16 women's individual events on 10 different venues in 6 countries had been organised on two different continents (Europe and Asia). There were also 6 men's team events and 1 mixed team event.

Peaks of the season were FIS Nordic World Ski Championships, the Four Hills Tournament and FIS Team Tour.

== Map of world cup hosts ==
Europe
Germany	Austria	Asia

== Men's Individual ==
=== Calendar ===
N – normal hill / L – large hill / F – flying hill
All	No.	Date	Place (Hill)	Size	Winner	Second	Third	Overall leader	R.
785	1	24 November 2012	(Norway) Lillehammer (Lysgårdsbakken HS100 / 138)	N _{146}	(Germany) Severin Freund	(Austria) Thomas Morgenstern	(Norway) Anders Bardal	(Germany) Severin Freund	
786	2	25 November 2012	(Norway) Lillehammer (Lysgårdsbakken HS100 / 138)	L _{550}	(Austria) Gregor Schlierenzauer	(Norway) Anders Fannemel	(Austria) Thomas Morgenstern	(Austria) Thomas Morgenstern	
787	3	1 December 2012	(Finland) Kuusamo (Rukatunturi HS142)	L _{551}	(Germany) Severin Freund	(Russia) Dimitry Vassiliev	(Switzerland) Simon Ammann	(Germany) Severin Freund	
788	4	8 December 2012	(Russia) Sochi (RusSki Gorki HS106)	N _{147}	(Austria) Gregor Schlierenzauer	(Germany) Severin Freund	(Austria) Andreas Kofler	(Germany) Severin Freund	
789	5	9 December 2012	(Russia) Sochi (RusSki Gorki HS106)	N _{148}	(Austria) Andreas Kofler	(Germany) Richard Freitag	(Germany) Andreas Wellinger	(Germany) Severin Freund	
790	6	15 December 2012	(Switzerland) Engelberg (Gross-Titlis HS137)	L _{552}	(Austria) Andreas Kofler	(Poland) Kamil Stoch	(Austria) Gregor Schlierenzauer	(Germany) Severin Freund	
791	7	16 December 2012	(Switzerland) Engelberg (Gross-Titlis HS137)	L _{553}	(Austria) Gregor Schlierenzauer	(Austria) Andreas Kofler (Germany) Andreas Wellinger		(Austria) Gregor Schlierenzauer	
792	8	30 December 2012	(Germany) Oberstdorf (Schattenberg HS137)	L _{554}	(Norway) Anders Jacobsen	(Austria) Gregor Schlierenzauer	(Germany) Severin Freund	(Austria) Gregor Schlierenzauer	
793	9	1 January 2013	(Germany) Garmisch-Pa (Gr. Olympiaschanze HS140)	L _{555}	(Norway) Anders Jacobsen	(Austria) Gregor Schlierenzauer	(Norway) Anders Bardal	(Austria) Gregor Schlierenzauer	
794	10	4 January 2013	(Austria) Innsbruck (Bergiselschanze HS130)	L _{556}	(Austria) Gregor Schlierenzauer	(Poland) Kamil Stoch	(Norway) Anders Bardal	(Austria) Gregor Schlierenzauer	
795	11	6 January 2013	(Austria) Bischofshofen (Paul-Ausserleitner HS140)	L _{557}	(Austria) Gregor Schlierenzauer	(Norway) Anders Jacobsen	(Austria) Stefan Kraft	(Austria) Gregor Schlierenzauer	
61st Four Hills Tournament Overall (30 December 2012 – 6 January 2013)					(Austria) Gregor Schlierenzauer	(Norway) Anders Jacobsen	(Norway) Tom Hilde	4H Tournament	
796	12	9 January 2013	(Poland) Wisła (Malinka HS134)	L _{558}	(Norway) Anders Bardal	(Germany) Richard Freitag	(Norway) Rune Velta	(Austria) Gregor Schlierenzauer	
797	13	12 January 2013	(Poland) Zakopane (Wielka Krokiew HS134)	L _{559}	(Norway) Anders Jacobsen	(Norway) Anders Bardal	(Poland) Kamil Stoch	(Austria) Gregor Schlierenzauer	
798	14	19 January 2013	(Japan) Sapporo (Ōkurayama HS134)	L _{560}	(Czech Republic) Jan Matura	(Norway) Tom Hilde	(Slovenia) Robert Kranjec	(Austria) Gregor Schlierenzauer	
799	15	20 January 2013	(Japan) Sapporo (Ōkurayama HS134)	L _{561}	(Czech Republic) Jan Matura	(Slovenia) Robert Kranjec	(Germany) Andreas Wank	(Austria) Gregor Schlierenzauer	
800	16	26 January 2013	(Norway) Vikersund (Vikersundbakken HS225)	F _{091}	(Austria) Gregor Schlierenzauer	(Switzerland) Simon Ammann	(Slovenia) Robert Kranjec	(Austria) Gregor Schlierenzauer	
801	17	27 January 2013	(Norway) Vikersund (Vikersundbakken HS225)	F _{092}	(Slovenia) Robert Kranjec	(Germany) Michael Neumayer	(Austria) Gregor Schlierenzauer	(Austria) Gregor Schlierenzauer	
		2 February 2013	(Czech Republic) Harrachov (Čerťák HS205)	F _{cnx}	cancelled due to strong wind and postponed on first event next day			—	
802	18	(Note: Cancelled individual event from Harrachov (2 February) was rescheduled to 3 February (as first event of the day).)3 February 2013	(Czech Republic) Harrachov (Čerťák HS205)	F _{093}	(Austria) Gregor Schlierenzauer	(Slovenia) Robert Kranjec	(Czech Republic) Jan Matura	(Austria) Gregor Schlierenzauer	
803	19	(Note: Original individual event, second of the day in Harrachov (3 February) had only one round due to weather conditions.)3 February 2013	(Czech Republic) Harrachov (Čerťák HS205)	F _{094}	(Austria) Gregor Schlierenzauer	(Czech Republic) Jan Matura	(Slovenia) Jurij Tepeš	(Austria) Gregor Schlierenzauer	
		10 February 2013	(Germany) Willingen (Mühlenkopfschanze HS145)	L _{cnx}	cancelled due to strong wind			—	
804	20	13 February 2013	(Germany) Klingenthal (Vogtland Arena HS140)	L _{562}	(Slovenia) Jaka Hvala	(Japan) Taku Takeuchi	(Austria) Gregor Schlierenzauer	(Austria) Gregor Schlierenzauer	
805	21	16 February 2013	(Germany) Oberstdorf (Heini-Klopfer HS213)	F _{095}	(Germany) Richard Freitag	(Norway) Andreas Stjernen	(Austria) Gregor Schlierenzauer	(Austria) Gregor Schlierenzauer	
5th FIS Team Tour Overall; TWO TEAM EVENTS INCLUDED (9 – 17 February 2013)					Norway	Slovenia	Austria	FIS Team Tour	
FIS Nordic World Ski Championships 2013 (23 – 27 February • (Italy) Val di Fiemme)
806	22	10 March 2013	(Finland) Lahti (Salpausselkä HS130)	L _{563}	(Germany) Richard Freitag	(Norway) Anders Bardal	(Norway) Anders Jacobsen (Germany) Severin Freund	(Austria) Gregor Schlierenzauer	
807	23	12 March 2013	(Finland) Kuopio (Puijo HS127)	L _{564}	(Poland) Kamil Stoch	(Japan) Daiki Ito	(Germany) Severin Freund	(Austria) Gregor Schlierenzauer	
808	24	15 March 2013	(Norway) Trondheim (Granåsen HS140)	L _{565}	(Poland) Kamil Stoch	(Germany) Richard Freitag	(Japan) Daiki Ito	(Austria) Gregor Schlierenzauer	
809	25	17 March 2013	(Norway) Oslo (Holmenkollbakken HS134)	L _{566}	(Austria) Gregor Schlierenzauer (Poland) Piotr Żyła		(Slovenia) Robert Kranjec	(Austria) Gregor Schlierenzauer	
810	26	22 March 2013	(Slovenia) Planica (Letalnica b. Gorišek HS215)	F _{096}	(Austria) Gregor Schlierenzauer	(Slovenia) Peter Prevc	(Poland) Piotr Żyła	(Austria) Gregor Schlierenzauer	
811	27	24 March 2013	(Slovenia) Planica (Letalnica b. Gorišek HS215)	F _{097}	(Slovenia) Jurij Tepeš	(Norway) Rune Velta	(Slovenia) Peter Prevc	(Austria) Gregor Schlierenzauer	
34th FIS World Cup Men's Overall (24 November 2012 – 24 March 2013)					(Austria) Gregor Schlierenzauer	(Norway) Anders Bardal	(Austria) Kamil Stoch	World Cup Overall	

=== Standings ===
==== Overall ====
Rank	after 27 events	Points
1	(Austria) Gregor Schlierenzauer	1620
2	(Norway) Anders Bardal	999
3	(Poland) Kamil Stoch	953
4	(Germany) Severin Freund	923
5	(Norway) Anders Jacobsen	878
6	(Slovenia) Robert Kranjec	802
7	(Slovenia) Peter Prevc	744
8	(Germany) Richard Freitag	736
9	(Germany) Michael Neumayer	678
10	(Czech Republic) Jan Matura	631

==== Ski Flying ====
Rank	after 7 events	Points
1	(Austria) Gregor Schlierenzauer	544
2	(Slovenia) Robert Kranjec	407
3	(Norway) Andreas Stjernen	313
4	(Slovenia) Jurij Tepeš	303
5	(Slovenia) Peter Prevc	296
6	(Czech Republic) Jan Matura	236
7	(Germany) Michael Neumayer	218
8	(Poland) Piotr Żyła	200
9	(Poland) Kamil Stoch	198
10	(Switzerland) Simon Ammann	194

==== Nations Cup ====
Rank	after 34 events	Points
1	Norway	5605
2	Austria	5599
3	Germany	5199
4	Slovenia	4664
5	Poland	3447
6	Japan	2183
7	Czech Republic	1770
8	Russia	959
9	Switzerland	636
10	Italy	378

==== Four Hills Tournament ====
Rank	after 4 events	Points
1	(Austria) Gregor Schlierenzauer	1100.2
2	(Norway) Anders Jacobsen	1087.2
3	(Norway) Tom Hilde	1029.2
4	(Poland) Kamil Stoch	1027.2
5	(Norway) Anders Bardal	1026.8
6	(Germany) Michael Neumayer	996.7
7	(Russia) Dimitry Vassiliev	994.8
8	(Slovenia) Peter Prevc	989.9
9	(Germany) Andreas Wellinger	988.7
10	(Germany) Martin Schmitt	980.8

==== Prizen money ====
Rank	after 34 events	CHF
1	(Austria) Gregor Schlierenzauer	176,500
2	(Norway) Anders Bardal	131,400
3	(Slovenia) Robert Kranjec	111,500
4	(Germany) Severin Freund	111,100
5	(Norway) Anders Jacobsen	105,800
6	(Slovenia) Peter Prevc	105,250
7	(Poland) Kamil Stoch	104,900
8	(Germany) Richard Freitag	93,000
9	(Slovenia) Jurij Tepeš	88,200
10	(Germany) Michael Neumayer	87,050

==== FIS Team Tour ====
Rank	after 4 events	Points
1	Norway	3834.3
2	Slovenia	3825.6
3	Austria	3783.5
4	Germany	3748.3
5	Japan	3522.1
6	Czech Republic	3211.2
7	Poland	3155.8
8	Finland	1955.7
9	Russia	1228.1
10	Italy	814.8

== Women's Individual ==
=== Calendar ===
N – normal hill / L – large hill
All	No.	Date	Place (Hill)	Size	Winner	Second	Third	Yellow bib	R.
14	1	24 November 2012	(Norway) Lillehammer (Lysgårdsbakken HS100)	N _{014}	(Japan) Sara Takanashi	(United States) Sarah Hendrickson	(Norway) Anette Sagen	(Japan) Sara Takanashi	
15	2	8 December 2012	(Russia) Sochi (RusSki Gorki HS106)	N _{015}	(United States) Sarah Hendrickson	(Japan) Sara Takanashi	(Norway) Anette Sagen	(United States) Sarah Hendrickson (Japan) Sara Takanashi	
16	3	9 December 2012	(Russia) Sochi (RusSki Gorki HS106)	N _{016}	(Austria) Daniela Iraschko (France) Coline Mattel		(Japan) Sara Takanashi	(Japan) Sara Takanashi	
17	4	14 December 2012	(Austria) Ramsau (W90-Mattenspr. HS98)	N _{017}	(Japan) Sara Takanashi	(France) Coline Mattel	(Austria) Daniela Iraschko	(Japan) Sara Takanashi	
18	5	5 January 2013	(Germany) Schonach (Langenwaldsch. HS106)	N _{018}	(Japan) Sara Takanashi	(Italy) Evelyn Insam	(Austria) Daniela Iraschko (Austria) Jacqueline Seifriedsberger	(Japan) Sara Takanashi	
19	6	6 January 2013	(Germany) Schonach (Langenwaldsch. HS106)	N _{019}	(Norway) Anette Sagen	(Austria) Daniela Iraschko	(France) Coline Mattel	(Japan) Sara Takanashi	
20	7	12 January 2013	(Germany) Hinterzarten (Rothaus-Sch. HS108)	N _{020}	(United States) Sarah Hendrickson	(Japan) Sara Takanashi	(France) Coline Mattel	(Japan) Sara Takanashi	
21	8	13 January 2013	(Germany) Hinterzarten (Rothaus-Sch. HS108)	N _{021}	(Japan) Sara Takanashi	(United States) Sarah Hendrickson	(Austria) Jacqueline Seifriedsberger	(Japan) Sara Takanashi	
22	9	2 February 2013	(Japan) Sapporo (Miyanomori HS100)	N _{022}	(France) Coline Mattel	(Austria) Jacqueline Seifriedsberger	(Norway) Anette Sagen	(Japan) Sara Takanashi	
23	10	3 February 2013	(Japan) Sapporo (Miyanomori HS100)	N _{023}	(Austria) Jacqueline Seifriedsberger	(Norway) Anette Sagen	(United States) Sarah Hendrickson	(Japan) Sara Takanashi	
		9 February 2013	(Japan) Zaō (Yamagata HS100	N _{cnx}	cancelled due to strong wind and postponed on first event next day			—	
24	11	(Note: Cancelled individual event from Zaō (9 February) was rescheduled to 10 February (as first event of the day).)10 February 2013	(Japan) Zaō (Yamagata HS100	N _{024}	(Japan) Sara Takanashi	(Austria) Jacqueline Seifriedsberger	(Germany) Carina Vogt	(Japan) Sara Takanashi	
25	12	10 February 2013	(Japan) Zaō (Yamagata HS100	N _{025}	(Japan) Sara Takanashi	(Austria) Jacqueline Seifriedsberger	(United States) Sarah Hendrickson	(Japan) Sara Takanashi	
26	13	16 February 2013	(Slovenia) Ljubno (Savina HS95)	N _{026}	(Japan) Sara Takanashi	(United States) Sarah Hendrickson	(France) Coline Mattel	(Japan) Sara Takanashi	
27	14	17 February 2013	(Slovenia) Ljubno (Savina HS95)	N _{027}	(Japan) Sara Takanashi	(France) Coline Mattel	(United States) Sarah Hendrickson	(Japan) Sara Takanashi	
FIS Nordic World Ski Championships 2013 (22 February • (Italy) Val di Fiemme)
28	15	15 March 2013	(Norway) Trondheim (Granåsen HS105)	N _{028}	(United States) Sarah Hendrickson	(Japan) Sara Takanashi	(Austria) Jacqueline Seifriedsberger	(Japan) Sara Takanashi	
29	16	17 March 2013	(Norway) Oslo (Holmenkollbak. HS134)	L _{001}	(United States) Sarah Hendrickson	(Japan) Sara Takanashi	(Austria) Jacqueline Seifriedsberger	(Japan) Sara Takanashi	
2nd FIS World Cup Women's Overall (24 November 2012 – 16 March 2013)					(Japan) Sara Takanashi	(United States) Sarah Hendrickson	(France) Coline Mattel	World Cup Overall	

=== Standings ===
==== Overall ====
Rank	after 16 events	Points
1	(Japan) Sara Takanashi	1297
2	(United States) Sarah Hendrickson	1047
3	(France) Coline Mattel	823
4	(Austria) J. Seifriedsberger	817
5	(Norway) Anette Sagen	612
6	(Slovenia) Katja Požun	499
7	(Germany) Carina Vogt	481
8	(United States) Lindsey Van	432
9	(United States) Jessica Jerome	422
10	(Austria) Daniela Iraschko	390

==== Nations Cup ====
Rank	after 17 events	Points
1	United States	2260
2	Slovenia	2041
3	Japan	1930
4	Norway	1303
5	Austria	1219
6	Germany	1077
7	France	1033
8	Italy	757
9	Canada	374
10	Czech Republic	112

==== Prize money ====
Rank	after 17 events	CHF
1	(Japan) Sara Takanashi	44,335
2	(United States) Sarah Hendrickson	31,410
3	(Norway) Anette Sagen	25,860
4	(Austria) J. Seifriedsberger	24,360
5	(France) Coline Mattel	24,240
6
7	(Slovenia) Katja Požun	14,490
8	(Germany) Carina Vogt	14,100
9	(United States) Lindsey Van	12,570
10	(United States) Jessica Jerome	12,270

== Team events ==
=== Calendar ===
All	No.	Date	Place (Hill)	Size	Winner	Second	Third	R.
Men's team
61	1	30 November 2012	(Finland) Kuusamo (Rukatunturi HS142)	L _{046}	Germany Andreas Wellinger; Michael Neumayer; Richard Freitag; Severin Freund	Austria Wolfgang Loitzl; Manuel Fettner; Gregor Schlierenzauer; Thomas Morgenstern	Slovenia Robert Kranjec; Jurij Tepeš; Jaka Hvala; Peter Prevc	
62	2	11 January 2013	(Poland) Zakopane (Wielka Krokiew HS134)	L _{047}	Slovenia Jurij Tepeš; Robert Kranjec; Jaka Hvala; Peter Prevc	Poland Piotr Żyła; Maciej Kot; Krzysztof Miętus; Kamil Stoch	Austria Wolfgang Loitzl; Andreas Kofler; Thomas Morgenstern; Stefan Kraft	
63	3	9 February 2013	(Germany) Willingen (Mühlenkopfschanze HS145)	L _{048}	Slovenia Jurij Tepeš; Jaka Hvala; Peter Prevc; Robert Kranjec	Norway Rune Velta; Tom Hilde; Anders Bardal; Anders Jacobsen	Germany Michael Neumayer; Richard Freitag; Andreas Wellinger; Severin Freund	
64	4	17 February 2013	(Germany) Oberstdorf (Heini-Klopfer HS213)	F _{014}	Norway Anders Jacobsen; Tom Hilde; Anders Bardal; Andreas Stjernen	Austria Stefan Kraft; Wolfgang Loitzl; Martin Koch; Gregor Schlierenzauer	Slovenia Jurij Tepeš; Robert Kranjec; Jaka Hvala; Peter Prevc	
5th FIS Team Tour Overall; THREE INDIVIDUAL EVENTS INCLUDED (9 – 17 February 2013)					Norway	Slovenia	Austria	
65	5	9 March 2013	(Finland) Lahti (Salpausselkä HS130)	L _{049}	Germany Andreas Wank; Michael Neumayer; Severin Freund; Richard Freitag	Norway Rune Velta; Andreas Stjernen; Anders Jacobsen; Anders Bardal	Poland Maciej Kot; Piotr Żyła; Krzysztof Miętus; Kamil Stoch	
66	6	23 March 2013	(Slovenia) Planica (Letalnica bratov Gorišek HS215)	F _{015}	Slovenia Jurij Tepeš; Peter Prevc; Andraž Pograjc; Robert Kranjec	Norway Rune Velta; Kim Rene Elverum Sorsell; Anders Bardal; Andreas Stjernen	Austria Wolfgang Loitzl; Stefan Kraft; Martin Koch; Gregor Schlierenzauer	
Mixed team
1	1	23 November 2012	(Norway) Lillehammer (Lysgårdsbakken HS100)	N _{001}	Norway Maren Lundby; Tom Hilde; Anette Sagen; Anders Bardal	Japan Yūki Itō; Yuta Watase; Sara Takanashi; Taku Takeuchi	Italy Elena Runggaldier; Andrea Morassi; Evelyn Insam; Sebastian Colloredo	

== Achievements ==
First World Cup career victory

- (France) Coline Mattel, 17, in her 2nd season – the WC 3 in Sochi; first podium was 2011-12 WC 1 in Lillehammer.
- (Norway) Anette Sagen, 28, in her 2nd season – the WC 6 in Schonach; first podium was 2011-12 WC 4 in Val di Fiemme.
- (Czech Republic) Jan Matura, 32, in his 9th season – the WC 14 in Sapporo; it is also the first podium of his career.
- (Austria) Jacqueline Seifriedsberger, 22, in her 2nd season – the WC 10 in Sapporo
- (Slovenia) Jaka Hvala, 19, in his 2nd season – the WC 21 in Klingenthal; it is also the first podium of his career.
- (Poland) Piotr Żyła, 26, in his 6th season - the WC 26 in Oslo; it is also the first podium of his career.
- (Slovenia) Jurij Tepeš, 24, in his 6th season – the WC 28 in Planica; first podium was 2012-13 WC 19 in Harrachov

First World Cup podium

- (Norway) Anders Fannemel, 21, in his 3rd season – no. 2 in the WC 2 in Lillehammer
- (Germany) Andreas Wellinger, 17, in his 1st season – no. 3 in the WC 5 in Sochi
- Evelyn Insam (ITA), 18, in her 2nd season – no. 2 in the WC 5 in Schonach
- (Austria) Stefan Kraft, 19, in his 2nd season – no. 3 in the WC 11 in Bischofshofen
- (Norway) Rune Velta, 23, in his 4th season – no. 3 in the WC 12 in Wisła
- (Germany) Carina Vogt, 21, in her 2nd season – no. 3 in the WC 11 in Zao
- (Slovenia) Jurij Tepeš, 22, in his 6th season – no. 3 in the WC 19 in Harrachov
- (Norway) Andreas Stjernen, 24, in his 3rd season – no. 2 in the WC 22 in Oberstdorf
- (Slovenia) Peter Prevc, 20, in his 4th season – no. 3 in the WC 27 in Planica

Victory in this World Cup (in brackets victory for all time)

- (Austria) Gregor Schlierenzauer, 10 (50) first places
- (Japan) Sara Takanashi, 8 (9) first places
- (Norway) Anders Jacobsen, 3 (9) first places
- (Austria) Andreas Kofler, 2 (12) first places
- (United States) Sarah Hendrickson, 2 (11) first places
- (Poland) Kamil Stoch, 2 (7) first places
- (Germany) Severin Freund, 2 (4) first places
- (Germany) Richard Freitag, 2 (3) first places
- (Czech Republic) Jan Matura, 2 (2) first places
- (France) Coline Mattel, 2 (2) first places
- (Norway) Anders Bardal, 1 (5) first places
- (Slovenia) Robert Kranjec, 1 (5) first places
- (Austria) Daniela Iraschko, 1 (3) first places
- (Slovenia) Jaka Hvala, 1 (1) first places
- (Norway) Anette Sagen, 1 (1) first places
- (Austria) Jacqueline Seifriedsberger, 1 (1) first places
- (Poland) Piotr Żyła, 1 (1) first places
- (Slovenia) Jurij Tepeš, 1 (1) first places

== See also ==
- 2012 Grand Prix (top level summer series)
- 2012–13 FIS Continental Cup (2nd level competition)
