= FIS Nordic World Ski Championships 2009 – Women's individual normal hill =

First Nordic Women's Ski Jumping World Championship

The Women's Individual normal hill ski jumping event at the FIS Nordic World Ski Championships 2009 was held on 20 February 2009. This was the first time the event was held at a World Championship.

== Results ==
Rank	Bib	Name	Country	Round 1 Distance (m)	Round 1 Points	Round 1 Rank	Final Round Distance (m)	Final Round Points	Final Round Rank	Total Points
1st place, gold medalist(s)	35	Lindsey Van	United States	89.0	112.0	4	97.5	131.0	1	243.0
2nd place, silver medalist(s)	34	Ulrike Grässler	Germany	93.5	120.0	1	93.0	119.0	3	239.0
3rd place, bronze medalist(s)	36	Anette Sagen	Norway	93.5	118.5	2	94.0	120.0	2	238.5
4	33	Daniela Iraschko	Austria	89.0	112.0	4	91.0	116.0	4	228.0
5	18	Coline Mattel	France	90.0	112.5	3	87.5	108.0	7	220.5
6	23	Jessica Jerome	United States	80.5	91.0	10	91.0	116.0	4	207.0
7	29	Magdalena Schnurr	Germany	89.0	111.0	6	81.5	94.0	12	205.0
8	31	Anna Häfele	Germany	88.5	109.5	7	82.5	95.0	10	204.5
9	30	Line Jahr	Norway	88.0	108.5	8	81.5	92.5	13	201.0
10	13	Ayumi Watase	Japan	76.5	82.5	12	90.5	115.0	6	197.5
11	32	Nata de Leeuw	Canada	84.5	100.0	9	82.0	95.0	10	195.0
12	27	Jacqueline Seifriedsberger	Austria	76.0	81.5	13	83.0	97.0	9	178.5
13	21	Evelyn Insam	Italy	79.5	88.5	11	78.0	85.0	16	173.5
14	22	Bigna Windmüller	Switzerland	74.5	77.0	16	78.0	86.0	15	163.0
15	26	Jenna Mohr	Germany	73.5	74.0	18	79.0	87.5	14	161.5
16	28	Helena Olsson Smeby	Norway	65.0	55.0	27	87.0	105.0	8	160.0
17	4	Yuki Ito	Japan	74.5	77.0	16	75.5	80.5	17	157.5
18	24	Lisa Demetz	Italy	71.0	70.0	20	68.5	65.0	22	135.0
19	9	Katie Willis	Canada	69.0	58.0	26	74.5	76.0	18	134.0
20	25	Alissa Johnson	United States	75.0	78.0	14	63.5	53.0	23	131.0
21	7	Ayuka Takeda	Japan	64.5	55.0	27	75.0	75.5	19	130.5
22	1	Maren Lundby	Norway	73.5	73.5	19	59.5	46.0	27	119.5
23	12	Wendy Vuik	Netherlands	69.5	66.5	23	65.5	51.0	24	117.5
24	17	Manja Pograjč	Slovenia	75.0	78.0	14	59.5	37.5	31	115.5
25	14	Izumi Yamada	Japan	71.0	68.5	21	59.5	45.5	28	114.0
26	5	Julia Kykkänen	Finland	59.5	44.5	30	72.0	68.5	20	113.0
27	15	Eva Logar	Slovenia	69.0	64.5	24	61.5	48.0	26	112.5
28	11	Michaela Doleželová	Czech Republic	70.0	67.5	22	59.5	45.0	30	112.5
29	20	Sarah Hendrickson	United States	60.5	44.5	30	69.5	66.0	21	110.5
30	19	Špela Rogelj	Slovenia	69.5	62.5	25	60.0	45.5	28	108.0
31	3	Lara Thomae	Netherlands	65.5	51.0	29	61.5	49.0	25	100.0
32	16	Elena Runggaldier	Italy	61.5	44.0	32				44.0
33	6	Caroline Espiau	France	59.0	42.5	33				42.5
34	8	Barbara Klinec	Slovenia	59.5	40.5	34				40.5
35	2	Vladěna Pustková	Czech Republic	54.0	27.0	35				27.0
36	10	Barbara Stuffer	Italy	52.0	22.5	36				22.5
