= Ski jumping at the 2014 Winter Olympics – Women's normal hill individual =

Women's normal hill individual at the XXII Olympic Winter Games
- Venue: RusSki Gorki Jumping Center
- Dates: 11 February 2014
- Competitors: 30 from 12 nations
- Winning score: 247.4

Medalists
1st place, gold medalist(s)		Carina Vogt	Germany
2nd place, silver medalist(s)		Daniela Iraschko-Stolz	Austria
3rd place, bronze medalist(s)		Coline Mattel	France

The women's normal hill individual ski jumping competition for the 2014 Winter Olympics in Sochi, Russia, was held on 11 February 2014 at RusSki Gorki Jumping Center in the Esto-Sadok village on the northern slope of Aibga Ridge in Krasnaya Polyana. Women competed in ski jumping for the first time in the history of the Winter Olympic Games.

== Results ==
The final was started at 22:25.

				Round 1			Final round			Total
Rank	Bib	Name	Country	Distance (m)	Points	Rank	Distance (m)	Points	Rank	Points
1st place, gold medalist(s)	29	Carina Vogt	Germany	103.0	126.8	1	97.5	120.6	5	247.4
2nd place, silver medalist(s)	28	Daniela Iraschko-Stolz	Austria	98.5	120.2	5	104.5	126.0	1	246.2
3rd place, bronze medalist(s)	24	Coline Mattel	France	99.5	125.7	2	97.5	119.5	8	245.2
4	30	Sara Takanashi	Japan	100.0	124.1	3	98.5	118.9	9	243.0
5	8	Evelyn Insam	Italy	98.5	120.5	4	99.0	121.7	4	242.2
6	25	Maja Vtič	Slovenia	100.5	120.1	6	100.5	121.8	3	241.9
7	26	Yuki Ito	Japan	97.5	117.4	10	101.0	124.4	2	241.8
8	23	Maren Lundby	Norway	97.0	115.5	13	100.0	120.0	6	235.5
9	18	Line Jahr	Norway	97.5	117.7	9	98.5	116.9	11	234.6
10	15	Jessica Jerome	United States	97.0	116.3	12	99.0	117.8	10	234.1
11	14	Katja Požun	Slovenia	96.5	113.9	17	99.5	119.7	7	233.6
12	7	Atsuko Tanaka	Canada	97.5	117.8	8	95.0	113.5	12	231.3
13	11	Taylor Henrich	Canada	97.5	118.2	7	96.0	112.2	14	230.4
14	20	Helena Olsson Smeby	Norway	98.5	115.0	15	98.0	113.3	13	228.3
15	6	Lindsey Van	United States	97.0	116.4	11	94.5	110.8	15	227.2
16	27	Irina Avvakumova	Russia	98.5	114.4	16	94.5	107.8	19	222.2
17	22	Julia Kykkänen	Finland	95.5	115.1	14	93.5	106.4	20	221.5
18	13	Bigna Windmüller	Switzerland	96.0	112.3	20	96.0	108.4	18	220.7
19	12	Julia Clair	France	95.5	113.8	18	91.5	104.7	22	218.5
20	3	Léa Lemare	France	93.0	107.9	22	93.0	110.2	16	218.1
21	1	Sarah Hendrickson	United States	94.0	112.4	19	91.5	105.2	21	217.6
22	16	Ulrike Gräßler	Germany	94.0	110.5	21	91.5	104.4	24	214.9
23	21	Katharina Althaus	Germany	90.5	103.2	24	92.5	108.6	17	211.8
24	5	Gyda Enger	Norway	93.0	105.8	23	91.5	103.9	25	209.7
25	4	Chiara Hölzl	Austria	92.0	102.5	25	96.0	104.6	23	207.1
26	9	Špela Rogelj	Slovenia	91.5	102.0	26	86.5	97.6	27	199.6
27	19	Eva Logar	Slovenia	90.0	100.1	28	88.0	99.0	26	199.1
28	17	Gianina Ernst	Germany	90.5	100.3	27	87.5	92.4	29	192.7
29	10	Elena Runggaldier	Italy	85.0	86.2	29	88.0	93.4	28	179.6
30	2	Yurina Yamada	Japan	78.0	73.3	30	64.5	42.4	30	115.7
