= FIS Nordic World Ski Championships 2013 – Women's individual normal hill =

Women's individual normal hill at the FIS Nordic World Ski Championships 2013
- Date: 22 February 2013
- Competitors: 43 from 16 nations
- Winning points: 253.7

Medalists
gold medal	Sarah Hendrickson	United States
silver medal	Sara Takanashi	Japan
bronze medal	Jacqueline Seifriedsberger	Austria

The women's individual normal hill ski jumping event at the FIS Nordic World Ski Championships 2013 was held on 22 February 2013.

== Results ==
The final was started at 16:00.

Rank	Bib	Name	Country	Round 1 Distance (m)	Round 1 Points	Round 1 Rank	Final Round Distance (m)	Final Round Points	Final Round Rank	Total Points
1st place, gold medalist(s)	42	Sarah Hendrickson	United States	106.0	127.4	1	103.0	126.3	2	253.7
2nd place, silver medalist(s)	43	Sara Takanashi	Japan	104.5	124.1	2	103.0	126.9	1	251.0
3rd place, bronze medalist(s)	40	Jacqueline Seifriedsberger	Austria	104.0	118.7	3	98.5	118.5	3	237.2
4	41	Coline Mattel	France	104.0	118.2	4	95.5	111.3	5	229.5
5	37	Carina Vogt	Germany	99.5	115.6	5	96.0	109.8	6	225.4
6	34	Jessica Jerome	United States	100.0	111.8	6	98.0	113.1	4	224.9
7	39	Anette Sagen	Norway	97.0	105.3	8	94.5	108.0	7	213.3
8	33	Evelyn Insam	Italy	96.0	106.1	7	92.5	104.4	12	210.5
9	6	Chiara Hölzl	Austria	95.5	98.9	12	94.5	105.4	10	204.3
10	13	Julia Kykkänen	Finland	92.5	103.2	9	90.0	100.0	17	203.2
11	14	Ulrike Gräßler	Germany	89.5	98.0	13	95.0	103.9	13	201.9
12	26	Elena Runggaldier	Italy	89.0	97.2	16	93.0	103.7	14	200.9
13	35	Špela Rogelj	Slovenia	91.0	95.6	20	93.5	104.8	11	200.4
13	11	Irina Avvakumova	Russia	94.0	102.1	10	91.0	98.3	21	200.4
15	28	Atsuko Tanaka	Canada	92.0	97.3	15	93.0	102.9	15	200.2
16	36	Lindsey Van	United States	89.0	90.6	24	93.5	107.8	8	198.4
17	31	Urša Bogataj	Slovenia	90.0	96.3	18	92.0	99.4	18	195.7
18	38	Katja Požun	Slovenia	91.0	95.6	20	90.5	99.4	18	195.0
19	30	Maja Vtič	Slovenia	86.0	88.1	26	94.5	106.7	9	194.8
20	29	Yuki Ito	Japan	90.5	95.5	22	91.0	98.8	20	194.3
21	18	Svenja Würth	Germany	93.0	100.9	11	89.0	93.0	24	193.9
22	20	Misaki Shigeno	Japan	91.0	97.9	14	88.0	93.2	23	191.1
23	17	Bigna Windmüller	Switzerland	89.5	95.7	19	87.5	93.9	22	189.6
24	19	Yurika Hirayama	Japan	90.5	96.6	17	86.5	91.4	25	188.0
25	23	Maren Lundby	Norway	85.5	86.4	27	92.5	101.3	16	187.7
26	10	Anastasiya Gladysheva	Russia	89.5	89.4	25	88.5	91.3	26	180.7
27	22	Wendy Vuik	Netherlands	88.5	93.2	23	85.5	84.6	28	177.8
28	12	Michaela Doleželová	Czech Republic	85.0	83.3	29	87.5	88.5	27	171.8
29	7	Manuela Malsiner	Italy	87.0	81.9	30	87.0	83.9	29	165.8
30	5	Chang Xinyue	China	89.5	85.1	28	83.5	77.3	30	162.4
31	9	Roberta D'Agostina	Italy	85.0	81.5	31				81.5
32	25	Katharina Althaus	Germany	82.0	80.4	32				80.4
33	27	Abby Hughes	United States	81.5	80.2	33				80.2
33	21	Alexandra Pretorius	Canada	85.0	80.2	33				80.2
35	16	Julia Clair	France	82.0	79.0	35				79.0
36	4	Katharina Keil	Austria	85.0	77.6	36				77.6
37	32	Line Jahr	Norway	90.0	72.0	37				72.0
38	24	Lea Lemare	France	84.0	70.3	38				70.3
39	2	Vladěna Pustková	Czech Republic	79.0	67.8	39				67.8
40	8	Liu Qi	China	80.0	66.2	40				66.2
41	15	Taylor Henrich	Canada	67.0	49.7	41				49.7
42	1	Li Xueyao	China	70.0	44.2	42				44.2
43	3	Dana Vasilica Haralambie	Romania	67.5	37.4	43				37.4
