= 2012–13 FIS Ski Flying World Cup =

FIS Ski Flying World Cup 2012/13
Winners
- Overall: (Austria) Gregor Schlierenzauer
- Nations Cup (unofficial): Slovenia

Competitions
- Venues: 4
- Individual: 7
- Team: 2
- Cancelled: 1

The 2012/13 FIS Ski Flying World Cup was the 16th official World Cup season in ski flying awarded with small crystal globe as the subdiscipline of FIS Ski Jumping World Cup.

== Map of World Cup hosts ==
(Norway) Vikersund	(Czech Republic) Harrachov	(Germany) Oberstdorf	(Slovenia) Planica
Vikersundbakken	Čerťák	Heini-Klopfer	Letalnica bratov Gorišek
Europe

== Calendar ==
=== Men's Individual ===
All	No.	Date	Place (Hill)	Size	Winner	Second	Third	Ski flying leader	R.
800	1	26 January 2013	(Norway) Vikersund (Vikersundbakken HS225)	F _{091}	(Austria) Gregor Schlierenzauer	(Switzerland) Simon Ammann	(Slovenia) Robert Kranjec	(Austria) Gregor Schlierenzauer	
801	2	27 January 2013	(Norway) Vikersund (Vikersundbakken HS225)	F _{092}	(Slovenia) Robert Kranjec	(Germany) Michael Neumayer	(Austria) Gregor Schlierenzauer	(Slovenia) Robert Kranjec (Austria) Gregor Schlierenzauer	
		2 February 2013	(Czech Republic) Harrachov (Čerťák HS205)	F _{cnx}	cancelled due to strong wind and postponed on first event next day			—	
802	3	(Note: Cancelled individual event from Harrachov (2 February) was rescheduled to 3 February (as first event of the day).)3 February 2013	(Czech Republic) Harrachov (Čerťák HS205)	F _{093}	(Austria) Gregor Schlierenzauer	(Slovenia) Robert Kranjec	(Czech Republic) Jan Matura	(Austria) Gregor Schlierenzauer	
803	4	(Note: Original individual event, second of the day in Harrachov (3 February) had only one round due to weather conditions.)3 February 2013	(Czech Republic) Harrachov (Čerťák HS205)	F _{094}	(Austria) Gregor Schlierenzauer	(Czech Republic) Jan Matura	(Slovenia) Jurij Tepeš	(Austria) Gregor Schlierenzauer	
805	5	16 February 2013	(Germany) Oberstdorf (Heini-Klopfer HS213)	F _{095}	(Germany) Richard Freitag	(Norway) Andreas Stjernen	(Austria) Gregor Schlierenzauer	(Austria) Gregor Schlierenzauer	
810	6	22 March 2013	(Slovenia) Planica (Letalnica b. Gorišek HS215)	F _{096}	(Austria) Gregor Schlierenzauer	(Slovenia) Peter Prevc	(Poland) Piotr Zyla	(Austria) Gregor Schlierenzauer	
811	7	24 March 2013	(Slovenia) Planica (Letalnica b. Gorišek HS215)	F _{097}	(Slovenia) Jurij Tepeš	(Norway) Rune Velta	(Slovenia) Peter Prevc	(Austria) Gregor Schlierenzauer	
16th FIS Ski Flying Men's Overall (26 January – 24 March 2013)					(Austria) Gregor Schlierenzauer	(Slovenia) Robert Kranjec	(Norway) Andreas Stjernen	Ski Flying Overall	

=== Men's team ===
All	No.	Date	Place (Hill)	Size	Winner	Second	Third	R.
64	1	17 February 2013	(Germany) Oberstdorf (Heini-Klopfer-Skiflugschanze HS213)	F _{014}	Norway Anders Jacobsen; Tom Hilde; Anders Bardal; Andreas Stjernen	Austria Stefan Kraft; Wolfgang Loitzl; Martin Koch; Gregor Schlierenzauer	Slovenia Jurij Tepeš; Robert Kranjec; Jaka Hvala; Peter Prevc	
66	2	23 March 2013	(Slovenia) Planica (Letalnica bratov Gorišek HS215)	F _{015}	Slovenia Jurij Tepeš; Peter Prevc; Andraž Pograjc; Robert Kranjec	Norway Rune Velta; Kim Rene Elverum Sorsell; Anders Bardal; Andreas Stjernen	Austria Wolfgang Loitzl; Stefan Kraft; Martin Koch; Gregor Schlierenzauer	

FIS Team Tour 2013 (part of)

== Standings ==
=== Ski Flying ===
Rank	after 7 events	26/01/2013 Vikersund	27/01/2013 Vikersund	03/02/2013 Harrachov	03/02/2013 Harrachov	16/02/2013 Oberstdorf	22/03/2013 Planica	24/03/2013 Planica	Total
	(Austria) Gregor Schlierenzauer	100	60	100	100	60	100	24	544
2	(Slovenia) Robert Kranjec	60	100	80	50	32	45	40	407
3	(Norway) Andreas Stjernen	50	32	50	45	80	36	20	313
4	(Slovenia) Jurij Tepeš	29	45	16	60	13	40	100	303
5	(Slovenia) Peter Prevc	5	45	45	11	50	80	60	296
6	(Czech Republic) Jan Matura	24	24	60	80	—	26	22	236
7	(Germany) Michael Neumayer	32	80	36	18	26	0	26	218
8	(Poland) Piotr Żyła	40	26	9	20	—	60	45	200
9	(Poland) Kamil Stoch	45	36	29	32	—	24	32	198
10	(Switzerland) Simon Ammann	80	50	24	40	—	—	—	194
11	(Austria) Wolfgang Loitzl	20	22	36	36	16	11	18	159
12	(Germany) Severin Freund	26	29	—	—	29	29	29	142
13	(Germany) Richard Freitag	13	11	—	—	100	0	11	135
14	(Norway) Rune Velta	14	20	—	3	6	6	80	129
15	(Austria) Martin Koch	18	15	26	29	12	10	16	126
16	(Poland) Maciej Kot	15	18	15	15	—	32	13	108
17	(Japan) Noriaki Kasai	—	—	—	—	—	50	50	100
	(Norway) Anders Jacobsen	36	10	—	—	45	9	—	100
19	(Slovenia) Jaka Hvala	—	—	40	24	18	—	—	82
	(Norway) Anders Bardal	22	14	—	—	15	16	15	82
21	(Norway) Anders Fannemel	16	12	22	22	0	5	4	81
22	(Japan) Daiki Itō	—	—	—	—	40	22	14	76
23	(Norway) Tom Hilde	11	9	—	—	36	—	6	62
24	(Austria) Michael Hayböck	12	13	8	14	4	—	2	53
25	(Czech Republic) Antonín Hájek	0	—	14	2	20	13	—	49
26	(France) Vincent Descombes Sevoie	2	5	4	9	10	18	—	48
27	(Czech Republic) Čestmír Kožíšek	8	—	20	16	2	—	—	46
28	(Italy) Sebastian Colloredo	—	—	13	26	—	0	5	44
29	(Germany) Maximilian Mechler	10	16	11	6	0	—	—	43
30	(Poland) Krzysztof Miętus	6	8	18	10	—	0	—	42
31	(Russia) Denis Kornilov	—	—	—	—	—	—	40	40
32	(Austria) Stefan Kraft	—	—	—	—	24	4	9	37
33	(Bulgaria) Vladimir Zografski	—	—	—	—	22	15	—	37
34	(Canada) MacKenzie Boyd-Clowes	7	1	12	7	—	—	—	27
35	(Estonia) Kaarel Nurmsalu	0	0	—	—	5	20	—	25
	(Norway) Kim René Elverum Sorsell	—	—	3	0	14	8	—	25
37	(Slovenia) Andraž Pograjc	—	—	—	—	—	14	7	21
	(Finland) Olli Muotka	9	2	10	0	0	—	—	21
39	(Czech Republic) Lukáš Hlava	—	—	5	0	—	3	12	20
40	(Switzerland) Gregor Deschwanden	5	7	0	0	—	7	—	19
41	(Germany) Andreas Wank	3	6	0	0	8	—	1	18
42	(Poland) Dawid Kubacki	0	3	1	0	—	0	10	14
	(Japan) Taku Takeuchi	—	—	—	—	9	2	3	14
44	(Czech Republic) Roman Koudelka	—	—	0	13	—	—	—	13
45	(Germany) Marinus Kraus	0	0	0	12	—	—		12
	(Germany) Andreas Wellinger	—	—	—	—	0	12	—	12
47	(Germany) Karl Geiger	—	—	—	—	11	0	—	11
48	(Austria) Manuel Fettner	—	—	—	—	—	1	8	9
49	(Germany) Felix Schoft	—	—	0	8	—	—	—	8
	(Norway) Fredrik Bjerkeengen	—	—	—	—	7	1	—	8
51	(Japan) Yūta Watase	—	—	—	—	7	0	—	7
	(Austria) Lukas Müller	1	—	6	0	—	—	—	7
53	(Italy) Davide Bresadola	0	—	0	5	—	—	—	5
54	(Italy) Andrea Morassi	—	4	—	0	—	—	—	4
	(United States) Peter Frenette	0	0	0	4	—	—	—	4
56	(Japan) Reruhi Shimizu	—	—	—	—	3	—	—	3
57	(Slovenia) Matjaž Pungertar	0	0	2	0	—	0	—	2
58	(Poland) Krzysztof Biegun	—	—	—	—	1	—	—	1

=== Nations Cup (unofficial) ===
Rank	after 9 events	Points
1	Slovenia	1811
2	Austria	1585
3	Norway	1550
4	Germany	999
5	Poland	963
6	Czech Republic	664
7	Japan	500
8	Switzerland	213
9	Italy	103
10	Finland	71
11	France	48
12	Russia	40
13	Bulgaria	37
14	Canada	27
15	Estonia	25
16	United States	4
