= Helena Olsson Smeby =

Norwegian ski jumper (born 1983)

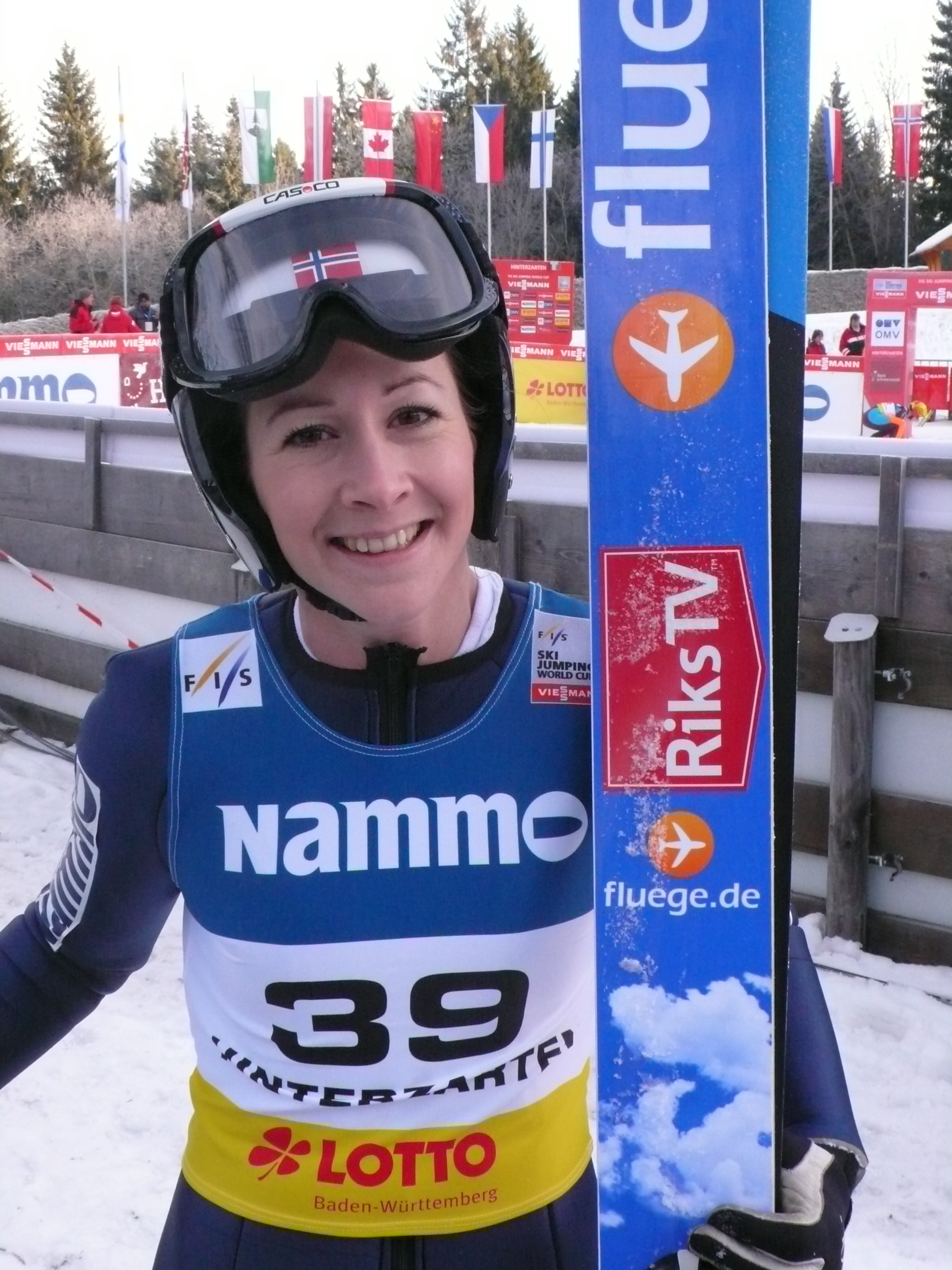
- Smeby in Hinterzarten, 2013

Personal information
- Born: 15 November 1983 (age 42) Sysslebäck, Sweden

Sport
- Sport: Skiing
- Club: Sysslebäcks IF, Byåsen IL/Trønderhopp

Achievements and titles
- Personal bests: 174.5 m (573 ft); Vikersund, Mar 2004

Helena Olsson Smeby (born 15 November 1983) is a Norwegian ski jumper.

== Biography ==
Smeby was born in Torsby, Sweden, and lives in Trondheim, Norway, where she represents the club Byåsen IL. She competed at the FIS Nordic World Ski Championships 2009 in Liberec, where she placed sixteenth in the women's individual normal hill She competes at the 2014 Winter Olympics in Sochi, in the ladies normal hill.
