= Katja Požun =

Slovenian ski jumper (born 1993)

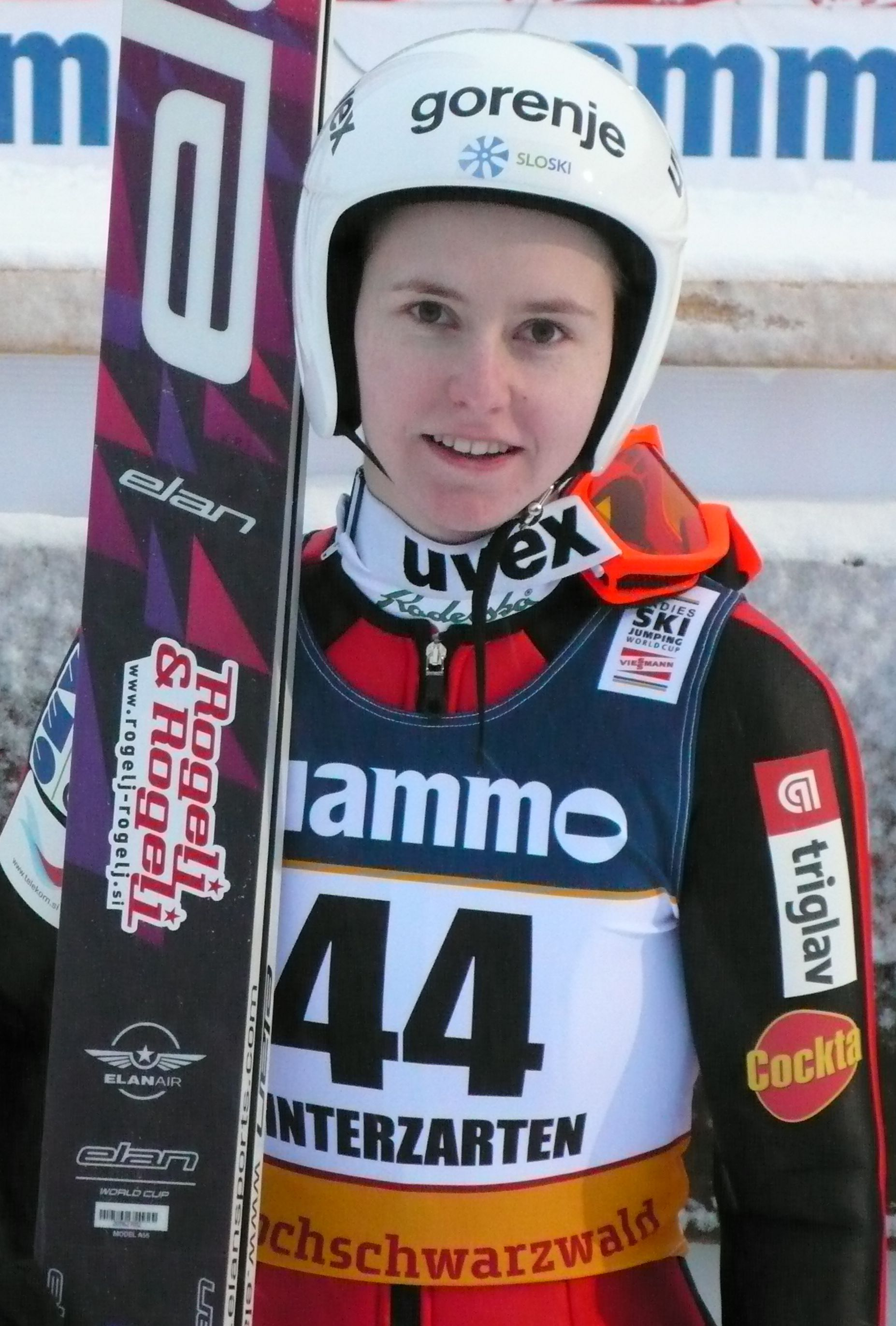
- Požun in Hinterzarten, 2012

Personal information
- Born: 7 April 1993 (age 33) Trbovlje, Slovenia

Sport
- Sport: Ski jumping

World Cup career
- Seasons: 2012–2018
- Indiv. starts: 77
- Indiv. podiums: 2

Achievements and titles
- Personal bests: 138 m (453 ft); Oberstdorf

Katja Požun (born 7 April 1993) is a Slovenian former ski jumper.

Požun made her World Cup debut on 3 December 2011 in Lillehammer, Norway. She reached the World Cup individual podium twice. At the 2014 Winter Olympics, she placed eleventh in the normal hill event. At the FIS Nordic World Ski Championships 2013 in Val di Fiemme, she finished 18th in the normal hill event. She also has four medals from the Junior World Championships, including gold in the women's team normal hill event from 2013.

== World Cup ==
=== Standings ===
Season	Position	Points
2011–12	7	422
2012–13	6	499
2013–14	12	350
2014–15	25	105
2015–16	23	160
