= FIS Team Tour 2013 =

Winners
- Overall: Norway
- Date: 9–17 February 2013

Competitions
- Venues: 3
- Individual: 2
- Team: 2
- Cancelled: 1

The FIS Team Tour 2013 was the fifth edition of FIS Team Tour which took place in Willingen, Klingenthal and Oberstdorf organized between 9–17 February 2013.

== Calendar ==
Date	Place	Hill	Size	Winner	Second	Third	Det.
9 February 2013	(Germany) Willingen	Mühlenkopfschanze HS 145 (night)	LH	Slovenia; Jurij Tepeš; Jaka Hvala; Peter Prevc; Robert Kranjec	Norway; Rune Velta; Tom Hilde; Anders Bardal; Anders Jacobsen	Germany; Michael Neumayer; Richard Freitag; Andreas Wellinger; Severin Freund	
10 February 2013	(Germany) Willingen	Mühlenkopfschanze HS 145	LH	strong wind			
13 February 2013	(Germany) Klingenthal	Vogtland Arena HS 140 (night)	LH	(Slovenia) Jaka Hvala	(Japan) Taku Takeuchi	(Austria) Gregor Schlierenzauer	
16 February 2013	(Germany) Oberstdorf	Heini-Klopfer-Skiflugschanze HS 213 (night)	FH	(Germany) Richard Freitag	(Norway) Andreas Stjernen	(Austria) Gregor Schlierenzauer	
17 February 2013	(Germany) Oberstdorf	Heini-Klopfer-Sc. HS 213 (night)	FH	Norway; Anders Jacobsen; Tom Hilde; Anders Bardal; Andreas Stjernen	Austria; Stefan Kraft; Wolfgang Loitzl; Martin Koch; Gregor Schlierenzauer	Slovenia; Jurij Tepeš; Robert Kranjec; Jaka Hvala; Peter Prevc	

== Overall ==
Rank		Points
1	Norway	3834.3
2	Slovenia	3825.6
3	Austria	3783.5
4	Germany	3748.3
5	Japan	3522.1
6	Czech Republic	3211.2
7	Poland	3155.8
8	Finland	1955.7
9	Russia	1228.1
10	Italy	814.8
