= RusSki Gorki Jumping Center =

Ski jumping venue in Russia

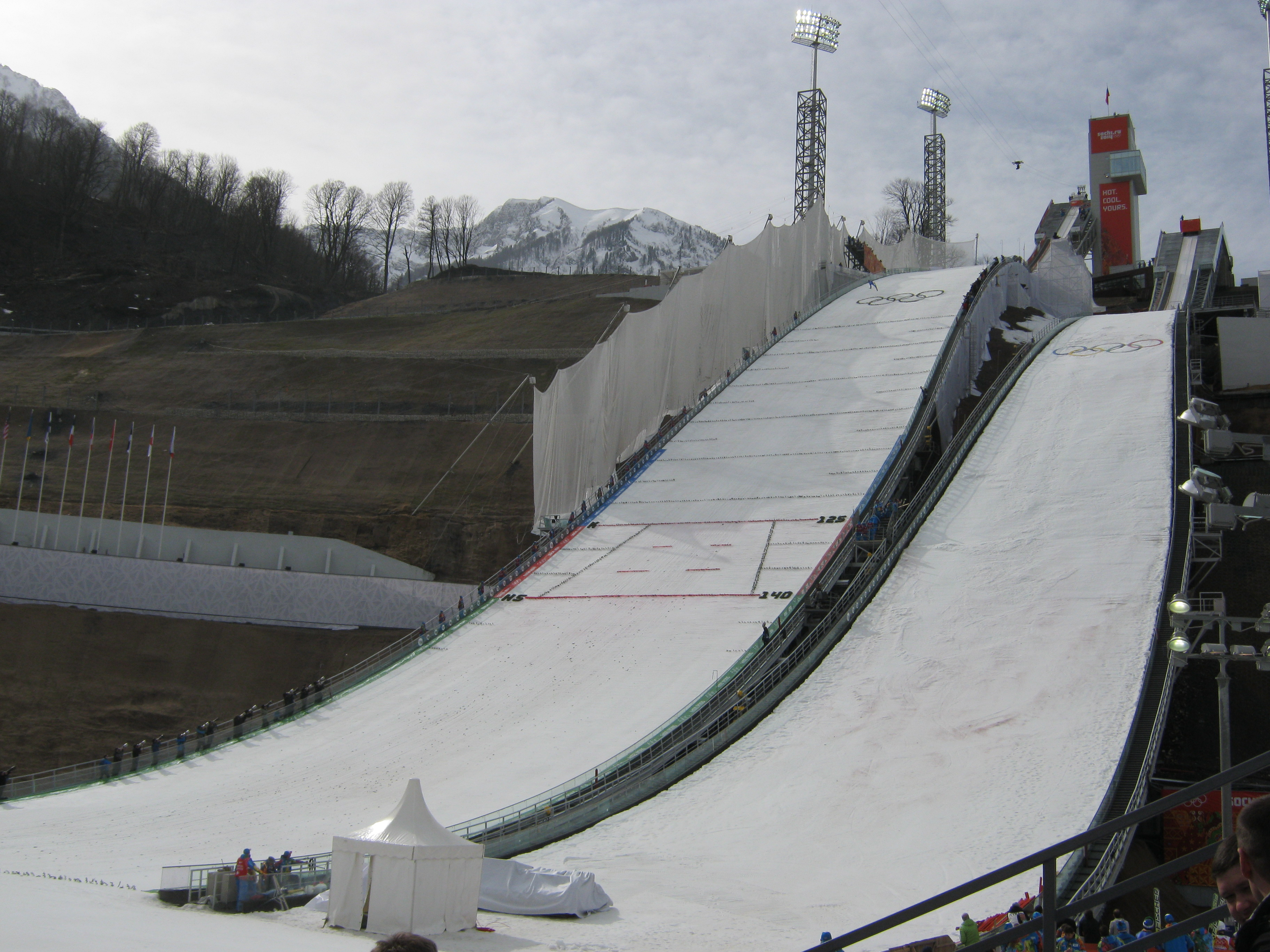
- Interactive map of RusSki Gorki Jumping Center
- Location: Sochi, Russia
- Coordinates: 43°40′33″N 40°14′28″E
- Capacity: 7,500 Olympic Mode

Construction
- Opened: 2012

Tenants
- 2014 Winter Olympics (ski jumping)

The RusSki Gorki Jumping Center is a ski jumping venue located in the Esto-Sadok village on the northern slope of Aibga Ridge in Krasnaya Polyana, Russia.

== History ==
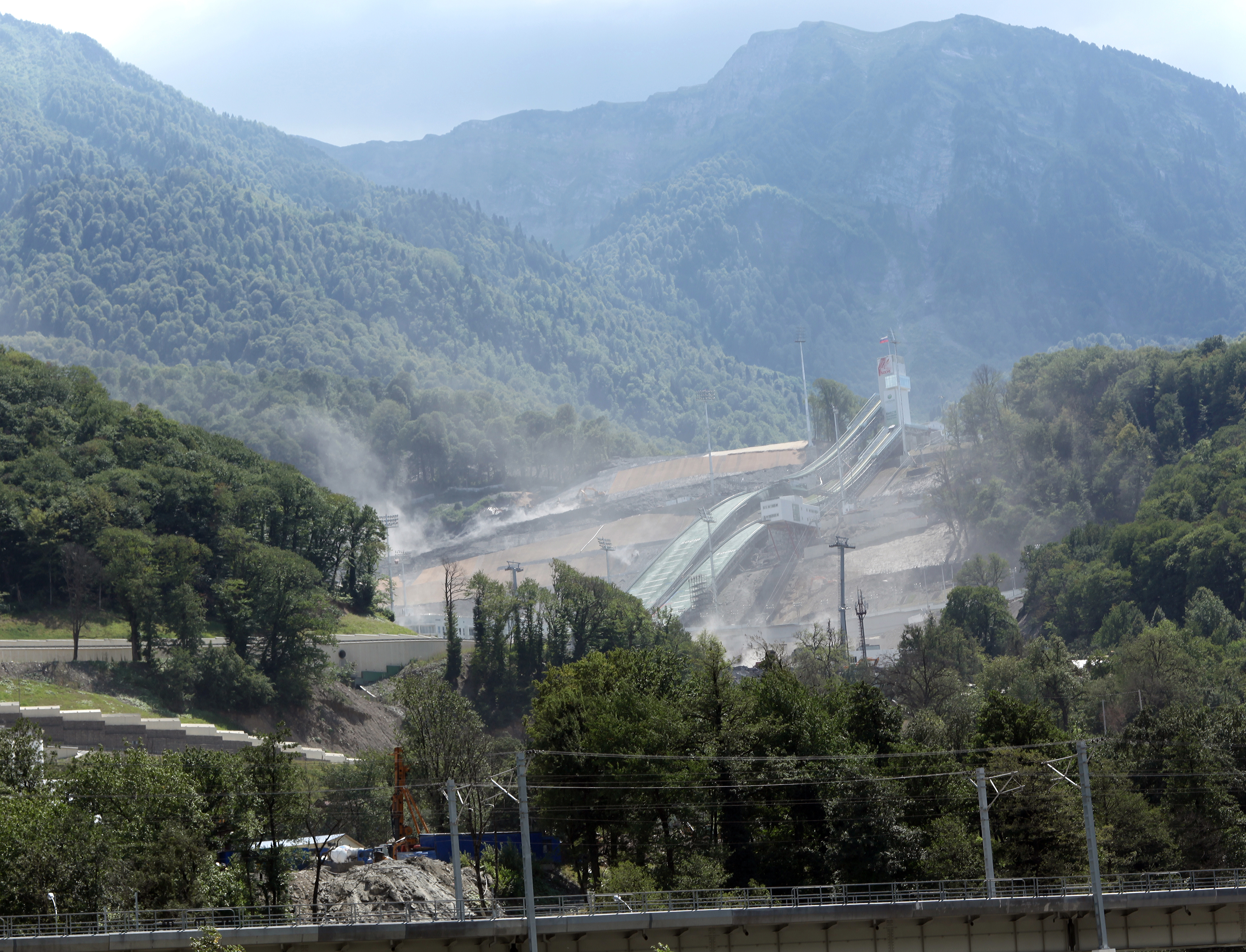
Photo from July 2013

It hosted the ski jumping and the ski jumping part of the Nordic combined event at the 2014 Winter Olympics in Sochi. Two Olympic jumps of K95 (HS102) and K125 (HS140) are constructed for these games with scheduled completion in 2011. Additional hills for youth training of K72, K45 and K25 will be constructed with the Olympic hills. It was first used in 2012.

== Events ==
=== Men ===
| Date | Hillsize | Competition | Winner | Second | Third |
|---|---|---|---|---|---|
| (night) 8 December 2012 | HS106 | WC | (Austria) Gregor Schlierenzauer | (Germany) Severin Freund | (Austria) Andreas Kofler |
| 9 December 2012 | HS106 | WC | (Austria) Andreas Kofler | (Germany) Richard Freitag | (Germany) Andreas Wellinger |
| (night) 9 February 2014 | HS106 | OG | (Poland) Kamil Stoch | (Slovenia) Peter Prevc | (Norway) Anders Bardal |
| (night) 15 February 2014 | HS140 | OG | (Poland) Kamil Stoch | (Japan) Noriaki Kasai | (Slovenia) Peter Prevc |
| (night) 17 February 2014 | HS140 | OG-T | Germany Andreas Wank; Marinus Kraus; Andreas Wellinger; Severin Freund | Austria Michael Hayböck; Thomas Morgenstern; Thomas Diethart; Gregor Schlierenzauer | Japan Reruhi Shimizu; Taku Takeuchi; Daiki Itō; Noriaki Kasai |

=== women ===
| Date | Hillsize | Competition | Winner | Second | Third |
|---|---|---|---|---|---|
| 8 December 2012 | HS106 | WC | (United States) Sarah Hendrickson | (Japan) Sara Takanashi | (Norway) Anette Sagen |
| 9 December 2012 | HS106 | WC | (Austria) Daniela Iraschko-Stolz (France) Coline Mattel | | (France) Coline Mattel |
| (night) 11 February 2014 | HS106 | OG | (Germany) Carina Vogt | (Austria) Daniela Iraschko-Stolz | (Norway) Anette Sagen |
