= Elena Runggaldier =

Italian skier (born 1990)

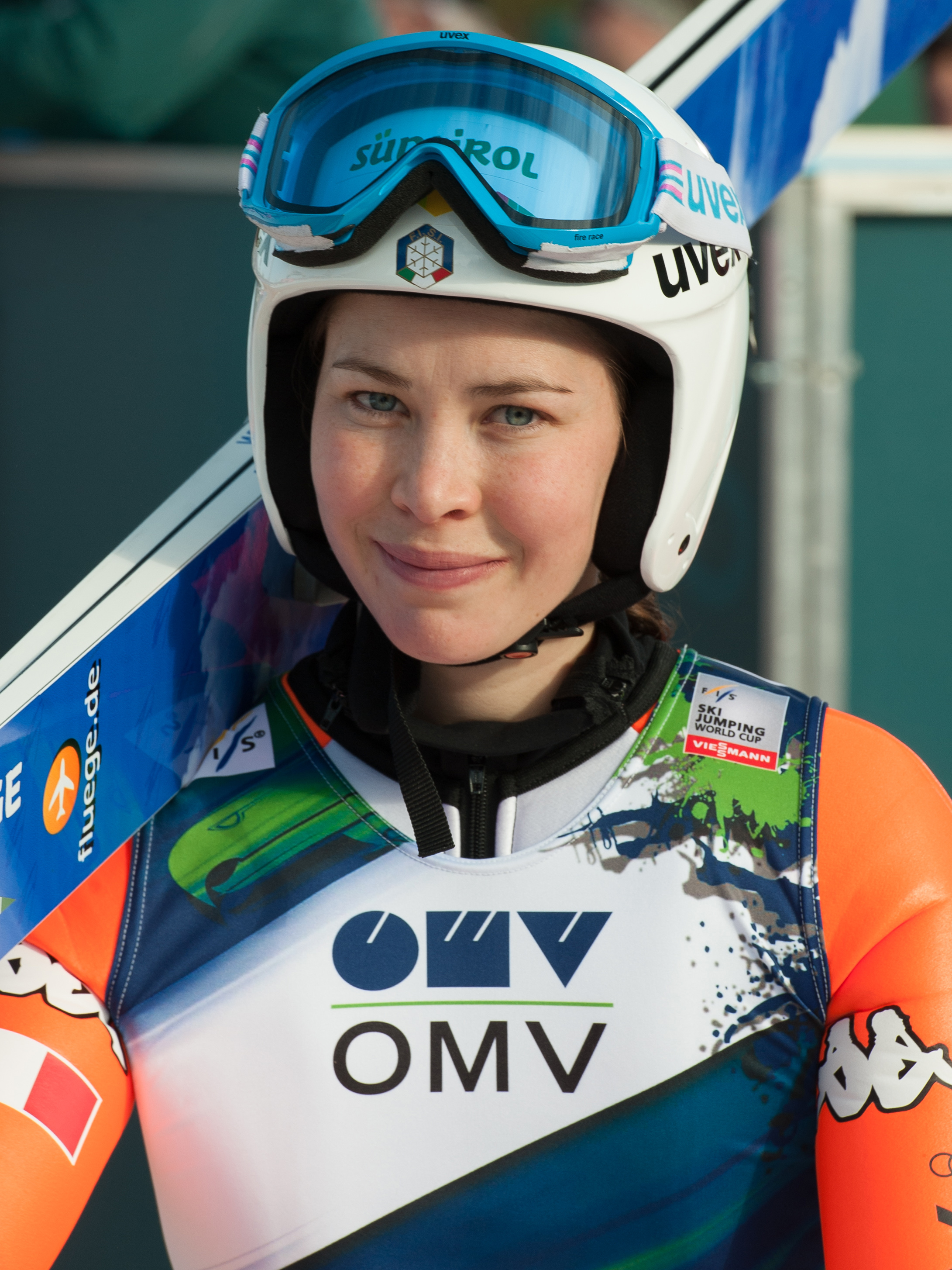
- Runggaldier 2015

Personal information
- Nationality: Italian
- Born: 10 July 1990 (age 36) Bolzano, South Tyrol, Italy
- Years active: 2008–2020
- Height: 164 cm (5 ft 5 in)
- Weight: 53 kg (117 lb)
- Spouse: François Braud (m. 2020)
Medal record
Women's ski jumping
Representing Italy
World Championships
Silver medal – second place	2011 Holmenkollen	Normal hill

Elena Runggaldier (born 10 July 1990) is an Italian former ski jumper and Nordic combined skier representing G.S. Fiamme Gialle.

== Biography ==
Runggaldier was born in Bolzano, South Tyrol, in northern Italy on 10 July 1990. In 2004, she finished first at the Italian championships of Nordic combined skiing. Also, in 2004 she placed first in the K62 jumping and second in the normal hill jumping of the Italian championships of ski jumping. Further notable results at the Italian titles of ski jumping were: first in 2006 and 2008, second in 2007, 2010, and 2011, and third in 2009.

She made her debut in the Continental Cup, the highest level in women's ski jumping, on 16 January 2005 with 23rd place in Planica. She had three times finished among the top three, with one win and no second place.

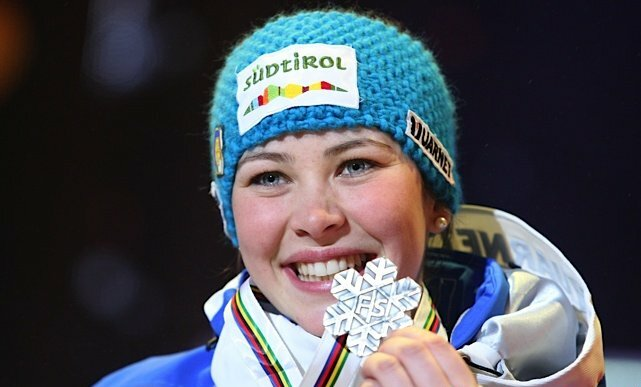
Elena Runggaldier holding the silver medal she won at the 2011 World Championships.

She won a silver medal in the 2011 World Championship in Oslo. She also took part in the 2012–13 FIS Ski Jumping World Cup, where she came 20th, the 2013–14 FIS Ski Jumping World Cup where she came 27th, the 2015–16 FIS Ski Jumping World Cup, and the 2016–17 FIS Ski Jumping World Cup.

She represented Italy at the 2014 Winter Olympics, coming 29th in the ski jumping at the Women's normal hill individual event. She again competed for Italy at the 2018 Winter Olympics, coming 33rd in the same event.

=== Private life ===
Runggaldier was at one time engaged to Italian Nordic skier David Hofer. It was announced by news outlets in 2020, that she is married to François Braud.
