= Jaka Hvala =

Slovenian ski jumper

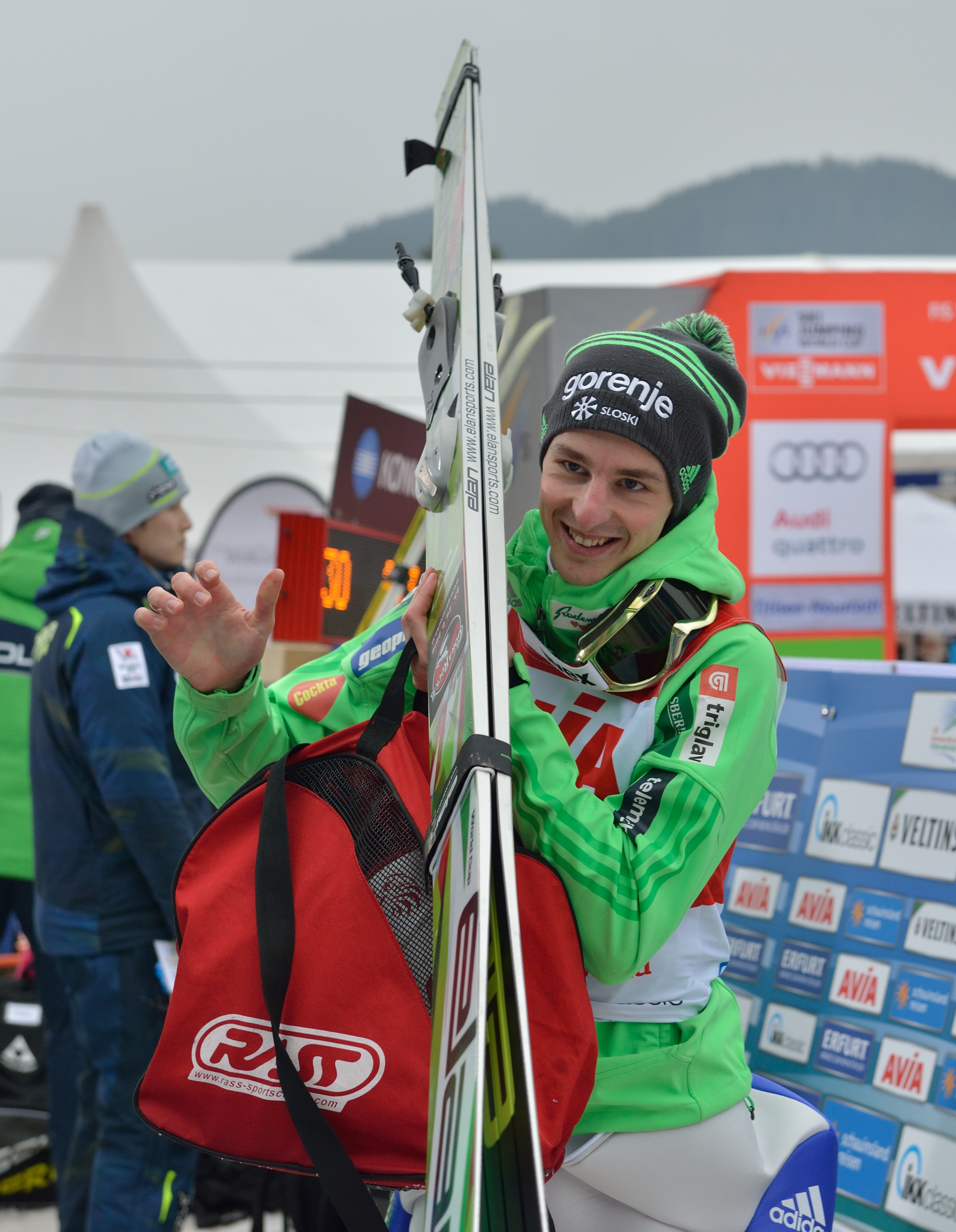

Personal information
- Born: 15 July 1993 (age 32) Slovenia

Sport
- Sport: Ski jumping

World Cup career
- Seasons: 2012–2017; 2019
- Indiv. starts: 67
- Indiv. podiums: 1
- Indiv. wins: 1
- Team starts: 10
- Team podiums: 5
- Team wins: 3

Achievements and titles
- Personal bests: 213 m (699 ft); Planica, 17 March 2012

Jaka Hvala (born 15 July 1993) is a retired Slovenian ski jumper. In 2013, he became a Junior World Champion. His personal best jump is 213 metres, set in 2012 in Planica.

== Career ==
Hvala made his World Cup debut in 2012 in Zakopane where he finished 29th. After some World Cup break, he gained points in Lahti with ninth place and in Oslo with eighth place. His first World Cup victory was in Klingenthal, at the large hill, in 2013. He received an individual silver medal in 2012 and a bronze medal at the 2010 Junior World Championships in the team competition.

In World Cup, Hvala won three team events with the Slovenian national team. He retired from professional ski jumping in August 2020.

== World Cup results ==
=== Standings ===
Season	Overall	4H	SF
2011–12	44	—	46
2012–13	16	14	19
2013–14	50	26	26
2014–15	—	—	—
2015–16	46	—	33
2016–17	—	—	—
2018–19	—	—	—

=== Individual wins ===
No.	Season	Date	Location	Hill	Size
1	2012–13	13 February 2013	(Germany) Klingenthal	Vogtland Arena HS140	LH
