= Coline Mattel =

French former ski jumper (born 1995)

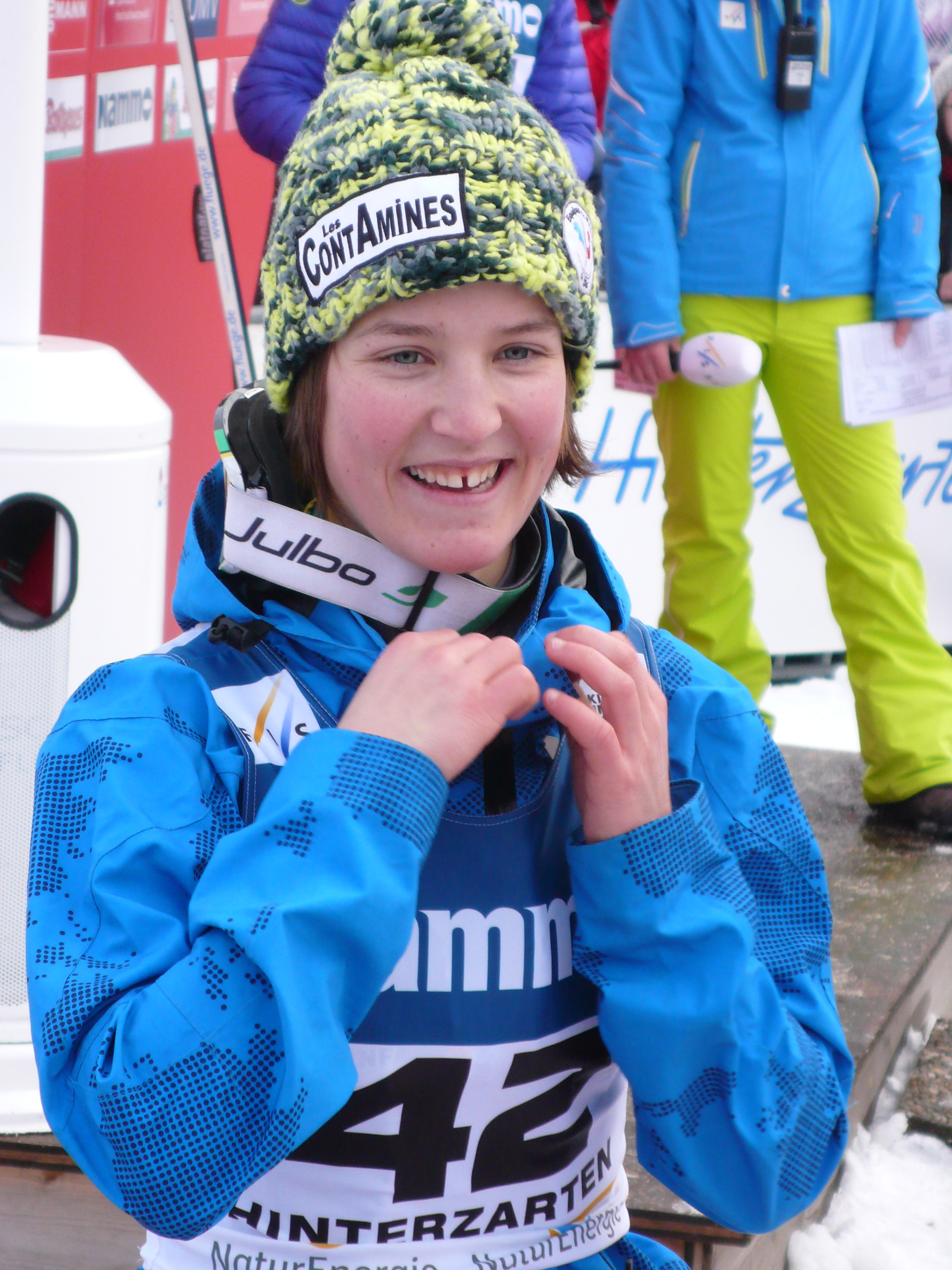

Personal information
- Nationality: France
- Born: 3 November 1995 (age 30) Sallanches, France

Sport
- Sport: Skiing
- Club: Les Contamines Montjoie

World Cup career
- Seasons: 2012–2012
- Indiv. starts: 82
- Indiv. podiums: 9
- Indiv. wins: 2
- Team starts: 2
Medal record
Women's ski jumping
Representing France
Olympic Games
| Bronze medal – third place | 2014 Sochi | Individual NH |
FIS Nordic World Ski Championships
| Bronze medal – third place | 2011 Holmenkollen | Individual NH |
- Updated on 25 March 2018

Coline Mattel (born 3 November 1995) is a French former ski jumper.

At the 2014 Winter Olympics she won a bronze medal becoming the first French ski jumping Olympic medalist. In World Championships in Oslo 2011 she took 3rd place. In World Cup she debuted on 3 December 2011 in Lillehammer where she took 2nd place, her first World Cup podium.

== Career ==
Coline Mattel made her debut in Ladies Continental Cup in Schonach at the age of 11. In her first Junior World Championships in Tarvisio (Italy) in 2007 she was placed 18th. In the Junior World Championships 2009 in Strbske Pleso Mattel won the bronze medal in the individual competition.

In World Championships in Liberec 2009 she took 5th place. She won one training round before the competition with a jump of 99 metres. In the FIS Junior Ski Jumping World Championships 2010 in Hinterzarten she won the silver medal and the gold medal in the FIS Junior Ski Jumping World Championships 2011 in Otepää

Mattel took 1st place in the Ladies Continental Cup (highest level in ladies' ski-jumping) in Notodden 2010/11.

== World Cup ==
=== Standings ===
| Season | Overall | L3 |
|---|---|---|
| 2011/12 | 10 | N/A |
| 2012/13 | 3rd place, bronze medalist(s) | N/A |
| 2013/14 | 8 | N/A |
| 2014/15 | 22 | N/A |
| 2015/16 | 33 | N/A |
| 2016/17 | 32 | N/A |
| 2017/18 | — | — |

=== Wins ===
| No. | Season | Date | Location | Hill | Size |
|---|---|---|---|---|---|
| 1 | 2012/13 | 9 December 2012 | (Russia) Sochi | RusSki Gorki HS106 | NH |
| 2 | 2012/13 | 2 February 2013 | (Japan) Sapporo | Miyanomori HS100 | NH |
