= Sarah Hendrickson =

American retired ski jumper (born 1994)

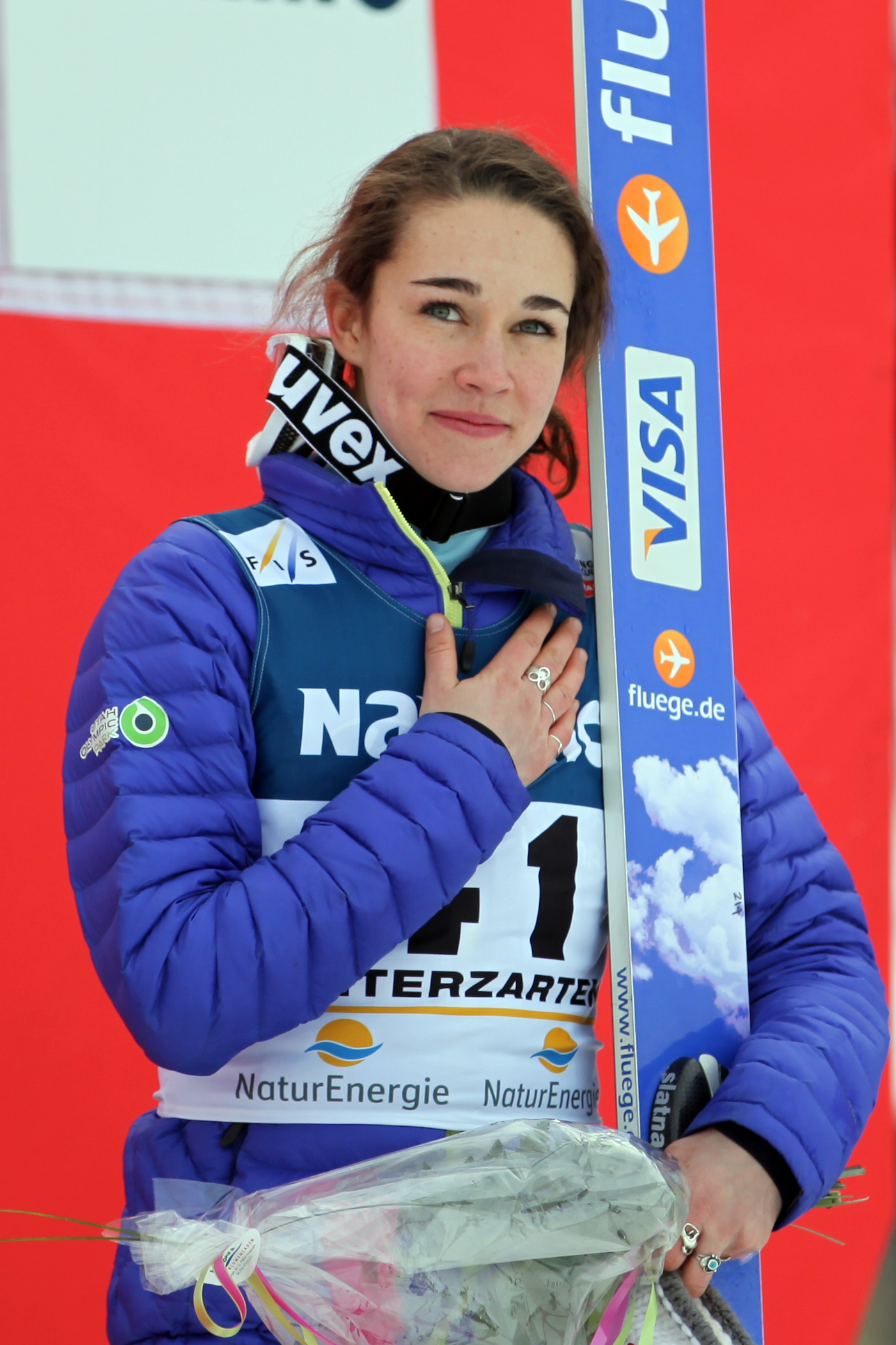
- Hendrickson in Hinterzarten, 2013

Personal information
- Full name: Sarah Catherine Hendrickson
- Nationality: United States
- Born: August 1, 1994 (age 32) Salt Lake City, Utah, U.S.
- Height: 5 ft 4 in (163 cm)

Sport
- Sport: Skiing
- Club: Park City Nordic Ski Club

World Cup career
- Seasons: 2012–2015; 2017–2018
- Indiv. starts: 61
- Indiv. podiums: 25
- Indiv. wins: 13
- Team starts: 3
- Overall titles: 1 (2012)

Achievements and titles
- Personal bests: 148 m (486 ft); Oberstdorf, August 20, 2013
Medal record
Women's ski jumping
FIS Nordic World Ski Championships
Gold medal – first place	2013 Val di Flemme	Individual NH
- Updated on March 10, 2019

Sarah Catherine Hendrickson (born August 1, 1994) is an American retired ski jumper. She won the inaugural women's World Cup season in 2012, finished runner-up in 2013, and won an individual gold medal at the 2013 World Championships.

== Career ==
Hendrickson was born in Salt Lake City, Utah. She attended Park City High School until 2011, when she began competing in the Ski Jumping World Cup. During this she moved to The Winter Sports School in Park City, where she graduated in November 2012.

In the first ever women's World Cup season in 2011/12, Hendrickson dominated by winning nine competitions; her first being on December 3, 2011 in Lillehammer. The 2012/13 season saw her win four World Cup competitions while finishing runner-up to nearest rival Sara Takanashi. Hendrickson was also able to win the women's event at the 2013 Ski Jumping World Championships in Val di Fiemme.

On August 21, 2013 in Oberstdorf, Hendrickson suffered a serious knee injury which required reconstructive surgery for a damaged ligament. She was one of five top female jumpers who, within a few months, had a bad fall and was forced to take a long recovery period. Hendrickson's injury would drain the chances of the United States women's team for a good result at the 2014 Winter Olympics in Sochi, but it was announced on January 22, 2014 that Hendrickson would still be able to make the team in time for the Games. She was granted the historic honor of being the first female to ever jump in a ski jumping event at the Olympics, with women having been allowed to participate in Olympic ski jumping for the first time in history.

Hendrickson re-injured her surgically repaired knee during off-season training in June 2015, ruling her out of the 2015/16 season.

In 2017, in an event sponsored by Red Bull, Hendrickson jumped off the historic Nansen Ski Jump in Berlin, New Hampshire. This event marked the first time the jump had been used in 32 years.

In December 2017, Hendrickson won the women's ski jumping competition at the U.S. Olympic Team Trials for Nordic Combined & Ski Jumping, securing her place on the U.S. Olympic team for Pyeongchang.

== World Cup ==
=== Standings ===
Season	Overall	L3
2011/12	1st place, gold medalist(s)	N/A
2012/13	2nd place, silver medalist(s)	N/A
2013/14	—	N/A
2014/15	8	N/A
2016/17	14	N/A
2017/18	49	—

=== Wins ===
No.	Season	Date	Location	Hill	Size
1	2011/12	December 3, 2011	(Norway) Lillehammer	Lysgårdsbakken HS100 (night)	NH
2	2011/12	January 8, 2012	(Germany) Hinterzarten	Rothaus-Schanze HS108	NH
3	2011/12	January 14, 2012	(Italy) Val di Fiemme	Trampolino dal Ben HS106 (night)	NH
4	2011/12	January 15, 2012	(Italy) Val di Fiemme	Trampolino dal Ben HS106 (night)	NH
5	2011/12	February 11, 2012	(Slovenia) Ljubno	Savina Ski Jumping Center HS95	NH
6	2011/12	February 12, 2012	(Slovenia) Ljubno	Savina Ski Jumping Center HS95	NH
7	2011/12	March 3, 2012	(Japan) Zaō	Yamagata HS100	NH
8	2011/12	March 4, 2012	(Japan) Zaō	Yamagata HS100	NH
9	2011/12	March 9, 2012	(Norway) Oslo	Midtstubakken HS106	NH
10	2012/13	December 8, 2012	(Russia) Sochi	RusSki Gorki HS106	NH
11	2012/13	January 12, 2013	(Germany) Hinterzarten	Rothaus-Schanze HS108	NH
12	2012/13	March 15, 2013	(Norway) Trondheim	Granåsen HS105	NH
13	2012/13	March 17, 2013	(Norway) Oslo	Holmenkollbakken HS134	LH
