= Evelyn Insam =

Italian ski jumper

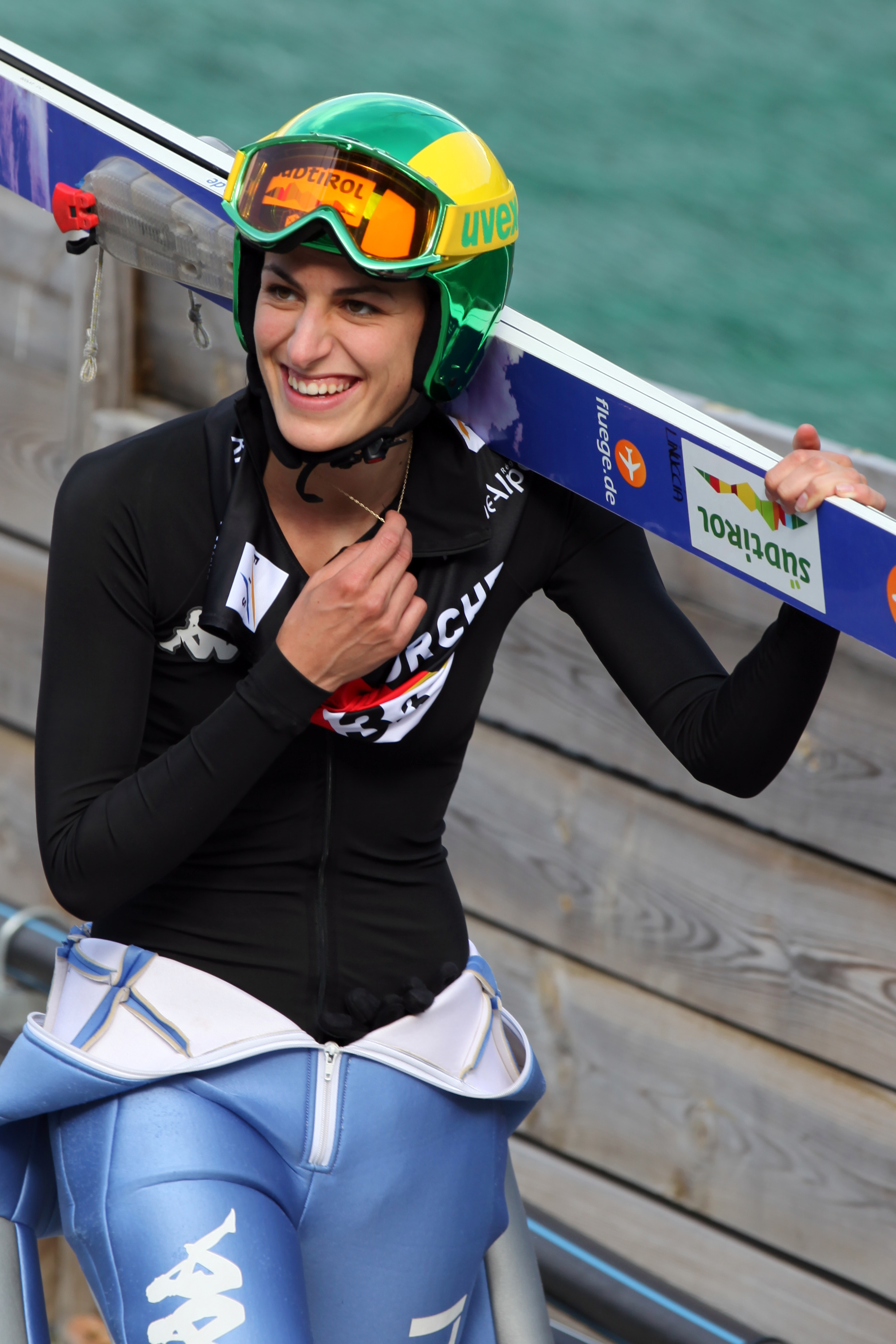
- Insam at the Summer Grand Prix in Courchevel, 2013

Personal information
- Born: 10 February 1994 (age 32) Brixen (Bressanone), Italy
- Height: 175 cm (5 ft 9 in)

Sport
- Sport: Skiing

Evelyn Insam (born 10 February 1994) is an Italian former ski jumper and the 2013 National Champion.

== Biography ==
Insam's debut at the FIS Ski Jumping World Cup took place in March 2011 in Lillehammer. Her best individual results were the two silver medals won at the World Cup in Schonach im Schwarzwald and at the Junior World Championships in Liberec in 2013.

Her younger brother Alex is also a ski jumper.
