= Bârsa (disambiguation) =

Bârsa may refer to the following places in Romania:

- Bârsa, a commune in Arad County
- Bârsa, a village in the commune Someș-Odorhei, Sălaj County
- Bârsa (Olt), a tributary of the river Olt in Brașov County, Romania
- Bârsa (Someș), a tributary of the river Someș in Sălaj County, Romania
- Bârsa Tămașului, a tributary of the river Bârsa in Brașov County, Romania
- Bârsa Fierului, a tributary of the river Bârsa in Brașov County, Romania
- Bârsa lui Bucur, a tributary of the river Bârsa in Brașov County, Romania

== See also ==
- Bârsău (river)
