= Valea Cheii =

Valea Cheii may refer to the following places in Romania:

- Valea Cheii, a village in the commune Păușești-Măglași in Vâlcea County
- Valea Cheii (Dâmbovița), tributary of the Dâmbovița in Argeș County
- Pârâul Cheii, tributary of the Pârâul Mic in Brașov County
- Valea Cheii, tributary of the Râul Mare in Brașov County

== See also ==
- Cheia (disambiguation)
- Râul Cheii (disambiguation)
