= Șcheiu =

Șcheiu Cheu, Oabăn, Graft
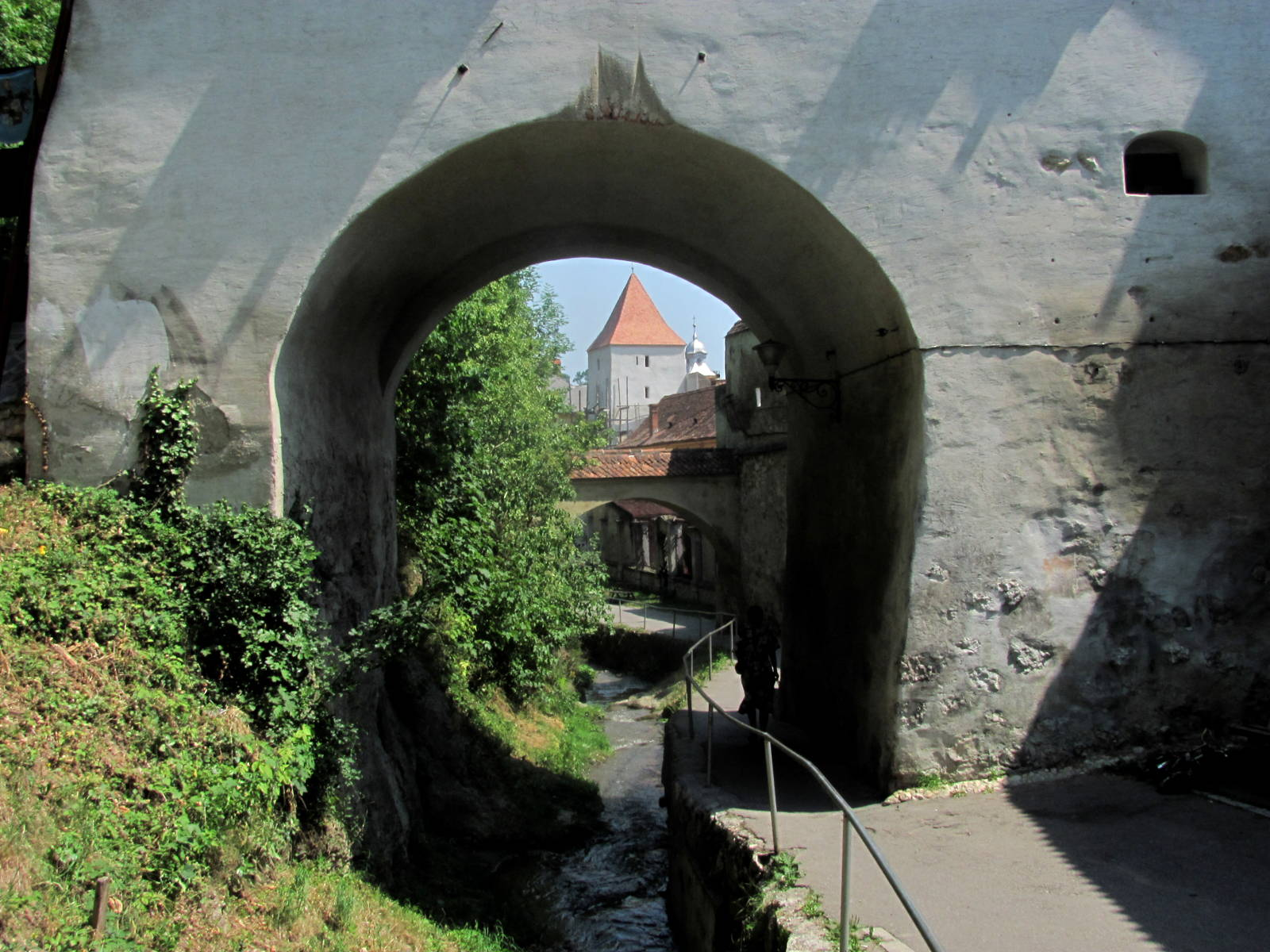

- Location within Romania

Location
- Country: Romania
- Counties: Brașov County
- Cities: Brașov

Physical characteristics
- Source: Postăvarul Massif
  - coordinates: 45°35′43″N 25°34′33″E
  - elevation: 1,276 m (4,186 ft)
- Mouth: Canalul Timiș
  - location: Brașov
  - coordinates: 45°39′53″N 25°37′58″E
  - elevation: 547 m (1,795 ft)
- Length: 9 km (5.6 mi)
- Basin size: 17 km^{2} (6.6 sq mi)

Basin features
- Progression: Canalul Timiș→ Ghimbășel→ Bârsa→ Olt→ Danube→ Black Sea

The Șcheiu or Cheu is a small river in the city of Brașov, Romania. It is intercepted by the Canalul Timiș (Timiș Canal). The upper reach of the river, upstream of Brașov, is also known as the Oabăn. The lower reach of the river was channelized so as to flow along the walls of the medieval city, contributing to the defenses of the city; this reach is also known as the Graft. It flows through the historic city district Șcheii Brașovului. Its length is 9 km (5.6 mi) and its basin size is 17 km^{2} (6.6 sq mi).
