= Șipoaia =

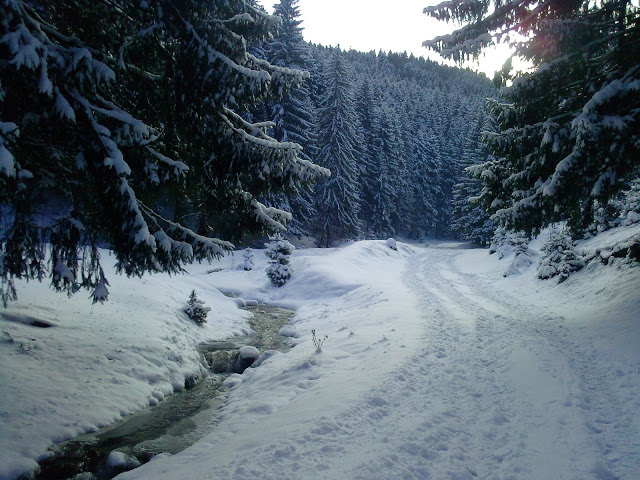
- The Șipoaia in winter

- Location within Romania

Location
- Country: Romania
- Counties: Brașov County

Physical characteristics
- Source: Piatra Mare Massif
  - coordinates: 45°33′27″N 25°38′05″E
  - elevation: 1,515 m (4,970 ft)
- Mouth: Timiș
  - coordinates: 45.5932°N 25.6352°E
  - elevation: 691 m (2,267 ft)

Basin features
- Progression: Timiș→ Ghimbășel→ Bârsa→ Olt→ Danube→ Black Sea
- Tributaries
  - right: Daschia, Chiva

The Șipoaia is a right tributary of the river Timiș in Brașov County, Romania. It flows into the Timiș in Dâmbul Morii.
