= Pârâul Mic (Ghimbășel) =

Pârâul Mic Pietrosu
- Location within Romania

Location
- Country: Romania
- Counties: Brașov County

Physical characteristics
- Source: Postăvarul Massif
  - coordinates: 45°30′29″N 25°31′53″E
  - elevation: 1,203 m (3,947 ft)
- Mouth: Ghimbășel
  - location: Upstream of Râșnov
  - coordinates: 45°34′03″N 25°27′30″E
  - elevation: 659 m (2,162 ft)
- Length: 12 km (7.5 mi)
- Basin size: 67 km^{2} (26 sq mi)

Basin features
- Progression: Ghimbășel→ Bârsa→ Olt→ Danube→ Black Sea
- Tributaries
  - right: Pârâul Cheii

The Pârâul Mic (in its upper course also: Pietrosu) is a right tributary of the river Ghimbășel in Romania. It flows into the Ghimbășel south of Râșnov. Its length is 12 km (7.5 mi) and its basin size is 67 km^{2} (26 sq mi).
