= Timmis =

Timmis may refer to:

== People ==
- Adrian Timmis, English cyclist
- Brian Timmis, Canadian football player
- Mercer Timmis, Canadian football player
- Peter Timmis, English cricketer
- Steve Timmis, Australian executive

== Other ==
- Timmis system, used in railway rolling stock
- Timmis (car), manufactured by the Timmis Motor Company

== See also ==
- Timis (disambiguation)
