= Valea Poienii River =

Valea Poienii River may refer to:

- Valea Poienii, a tributary of the Valea Cheii in Brașov County, Romania
- Poieni, a tributary of the Cheia in Alba County, Romania
- Valea Poienii, a tributary of the Râul Târgului in Argeș County, Romania
- Valea Poienii, a tributary of the Vărbilău in Prahova County, Romania
