= Cheia (disambiguation) =

Cheia may refer to several places in Romania:

- Cheia, a mountain resort in Prahova County
- Cheia Monastery, a monastery in Prahova County
- Cheia, a village in Râmeț Commune, Alba County
- Cheia, a village in Moieciu Commune, Braşov County
- Cheia, a village in Mihai Viteazu Commune, Cluj County
- Cheia, a village in Grădina Commune, Constanța County
- Cheia, a village in Măneciu Commune, Prahova County, the site of Cheia resort
- Cheia, a village in Băile Olănești Commune, Vâlcea County
- Cheia (Arieș), a tributary of the Arieș in Alba County
- Cheia (Olănești), a tributary of the Olănești in Vâlcea County
- Valea Cheii (Dâmbovița), a tributary of the Dâmbovița in Argeș County
- Cheia Păscoaia, a tributary of the Păscoaia in Vâlcea County

== See also ==
- Râul Cheii (disambiguation)
- Valea Cheii (disambiguation)
