= Valea Cetății =

Valea Cetății may refer to the following rivers in Romania:

- Valea Cetății (Brașov), a river in the city of Brașov
- Valea Cetății, a tributary of the river Ghimbășel in Brașov County
- Valea Cetății, a tributary of the river Olt near Racoș, Brașov County
- Valea Cetății, a tributary of the river Olt near Rotbav, Brașov County
- Valea Cetății, a tributary of the river Sibiel in Sibiu County
