= Bod, Brașov =

Bod
- Commune
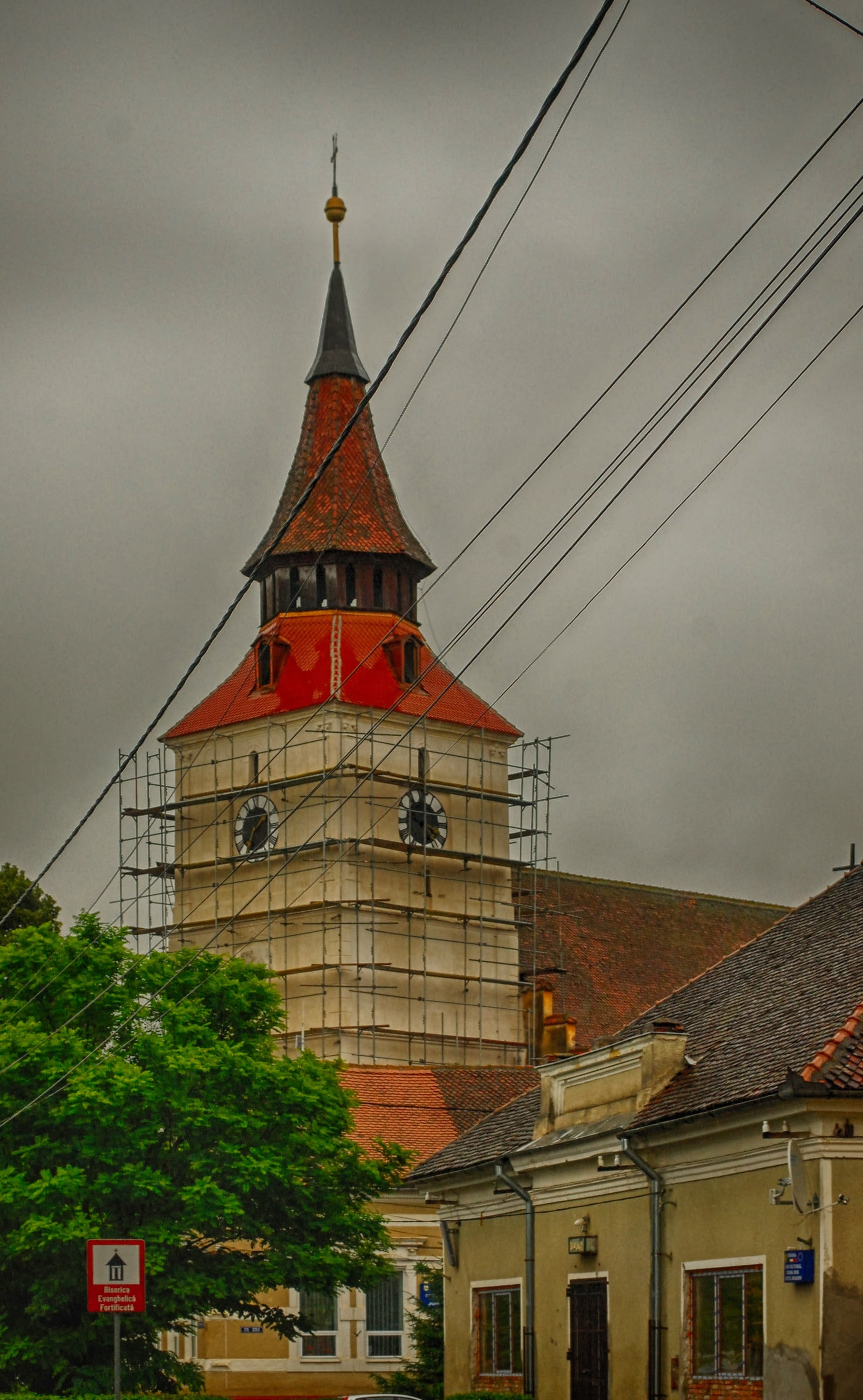
- Bod fortified church

- Coat of arms

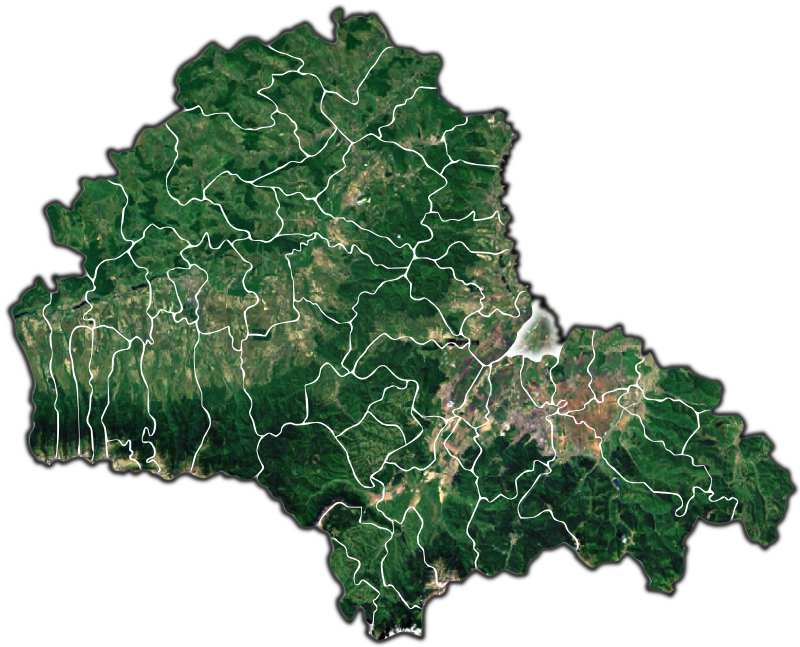
- Location within the county

- Location in Romania
- Coordinates: 45°46′N 25°39′E
- Country: Romania
- County: Brașov

Government
  - Mayor (2020–2024): Sergiu Arsene (Ind.)
- Area: 33.56 km^{2} (12.96 sq mi)
- Elevation: 506 m (1,660 ft)
- Population (2021-12-01): 5,097
  - Density: 151.9/km^{2} (393.4/sq mi)
- Time zone: UTC+02:00 (EET)
  - Summer (DST): UTC+03:00 (EEST)
- Postal code: 507015
- Area code: (+40) 02 68
- Vehicle reg.: BV
- Website: www.primariabod.ro

Bod (German: Brenndorf; Hungarian: Botfalu) is a commune in Brașov County, Transylvania, Romania. It is composed of two villages, Bod and Colonia Bod (Botfalusi Cukorgyártelep).

== Geography ==
The commune is located in the eastern part of the county, in the northeastern corner of the Burzenland. It is situated on the left bank of the Olt River, which mostly follows the border with Covasna County. The Ghimbășel River flows through Bod; originally it discharged directly into the Olt, but much of its flow has been diverted into the Bârsa River (another tributary of the Olt), near Colonia Bod.

== Economy ==
At Colonia Bod there is one of Romania's largest sugar factories, which is now defunct, and a broadcasting transmitter for long- and medium-wave radio, the Bod Transmitter. The lowest ever recorded temperature in Romania, −38.5 °C (−37.3 °F), was measured in Bod on January 25, 1942.

== Demographics ==
Historical population
Year	Pop.	±%
1850	1,933	—
1920	2,393	+23.8%
1956	3,892	+62.6%
1977	5,082	+30.6%
2002	3,927	−22.7%
2011	3,994	+1.7%
2021	5,097	+27.6%
Source: Census data

At the 2011 census, 89.6% of the 3,994 inhabitants were Romanians, 8.5% Hungarians, and 1.1% Germans. At the 2021 census, Bod had a population of 5,097; of those, 85,46% were Romanians and 3.85% Hungarians.

== Natives ==
- Damasus Dürr (1537–1585), humanist
- Nicolae Oaidă (1933–2025), footballer and manager
- Reinhardt Schuster (b. 1936), painter
