= Pănicel =

- Location within Romania

Location
- Country: Romania
- Counties: Brașov County

Physical characteristics
- Source: Bucegi Mountains
- Mouth: Sohodol
  - coordinates: 45.5854°N 25.4327°E
- Length: 14 km (8.7 mi)
- Basin size: 17 km^{2} (6.6 sq mi)

Basin features
- Progression: Sohodol→ Bârsa→ Olt→ Danube→ Black Sea
- Tributaries
  - right: Urlătoarea

The Pănicel is a right tributary of the river Sohodol in Romania. It flows into the Sohodol near Râșnov. Its length is 14 km (8.7 mi) and its basin size is 17 km^{2} (6.6 sq mi).
