= Timiș (disambiguation) =

Timiș is a river in western Romania and Serbia.

Timiș may also refer to:

- Timiș County, a county in western Romania
- Ținutul Timiș, a former administrative unit of Romania
- Temes County, a former administrative county (comitatus) in the historic Kingdom of Hungary
- Timiș-Torontal County, a former county in the historic Kingdom of Romania
- Timiș-Cerna Gap, a mountain pass in south-western Romania
- Slatina-Timiș, a commune in Caraș-Severin County, Romania
- Timiș (Olt), a tributary of the Olt River in central Romania
- Canalul Timiș, a canal linking the Timiș and the Ghimbășel rivers in Romania
- Frank Timiș (born 1965), Romanian-Australian businessman living in London
- Timiș 2, a series of tramcars built by the Timișoara Transport and Tram Carriage Construction Company

== See also ==
- Timișoara, a city in western Romania, in Timiș County
- Timișu de Jos, a village in Brașov County on the Timiș valley
- Timișu de Sus, a village also in Brașov County on the Timiș valley
- Timișana, a tributary of the Timiș River
- Timișul Mort River, a tributary of the Timiș River
- Timișel River, a tributary of the Bega River
