= Râșnov (disambiguation) =

Râșnov may refer to:

- Râșnov, a town in Brașov County, Romania.
- Râșnov Fortress, historic monument and landmark in Romania.
- Râșnov River, a tributary of the Sohodol River in Romania.
