= Gârbău =

Gârbău may refer to the following places in Romania:

- Gârbău, Cluj, a commune in Cluj County
- Gârbău (Durbav), a tributary of the Durbav in Brașov County
- Gârbău (Someșul Mic), a tributary of the Someșul Mic in Cluj County
- Gârbău (Secaș), a tributary of the Secaș in Alba County
- Gârbăul Dejului, a tributary of the Someșul Mare
