= După Deal =

După Deal may refer to several villages in Romania:

- După Deal, a village in Lupșa Commune, Alba County
- După Deal, a village in Ponor, Alba
- După Deal, a village in Milaș Commune, Bistriţa-Năsăud County
- După Deal, a village in Pietrari, Dâmbovița
- După Deal, a village in Cuci Commune, Mureș County
- După Deal, a village in Iclănzel Commune, Mureș County
