= Gârbău (Durbav) =

- Location within Romania

Location
- Country: Romania
- Counties: Brașov County

Physical characteristics
- Mouth: Durbav
  - location: Downstream of Săcele
  - coordinates: 45.6340°N 25.6835°E
  - elevation: 615 m (2,018 ft)

Basin features
- Progression: Durbav→ Ghimbășel→ Bârsa→ Olt→ Danube→ Black Sea

The Gârbău is a left tributary of the river Durbav in Romania. It flows through the city Săcele, and discharges into the Durbav north of Săcele.
