= RATBV =

Public transit operator in Brașov, Romania

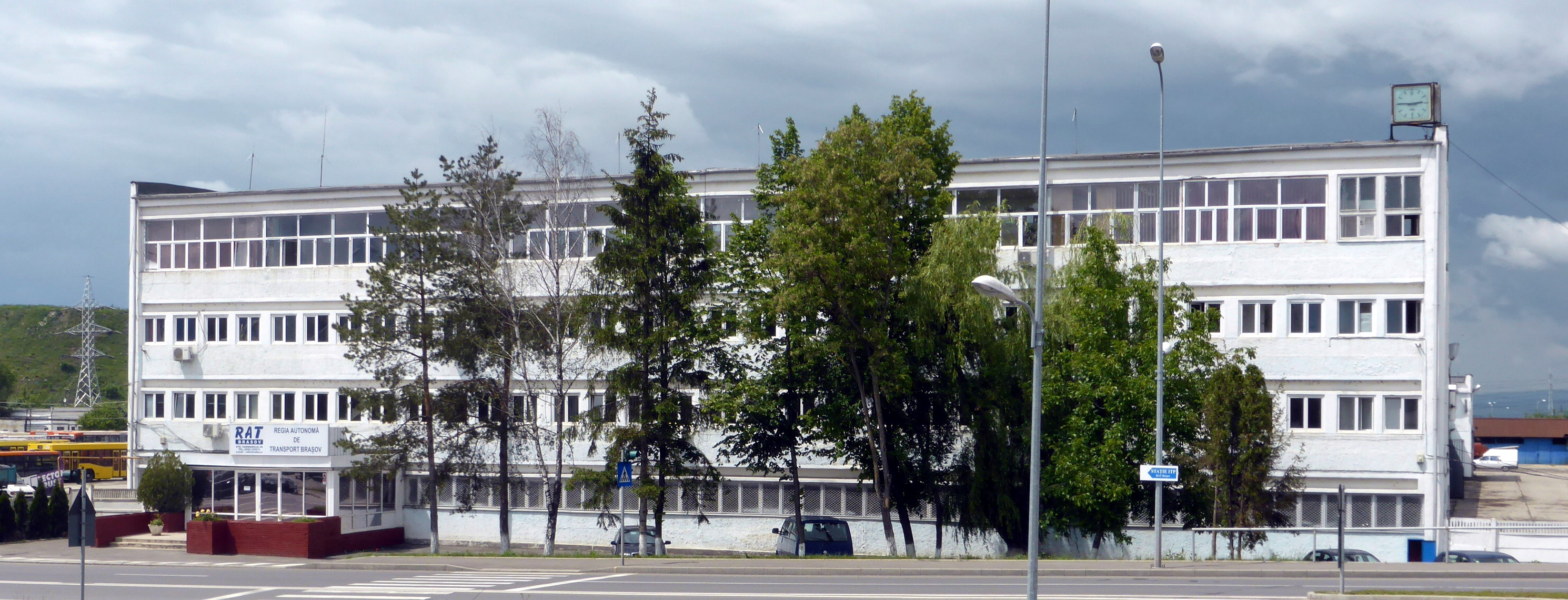
- Location: Brașov, Romania
- Website: www.ratbv.ro

RATBV S.A., formerly Regia Autonomă de Transport Brașov (English: Autonomous Transportation Board of Brașov), and commonly referred to as RAT Brașov, is the only public transport operator in the city of Brașov, Romania. It is owned by the Brașov Municipality and it operates on a network of 43 routes inside Brașov, summing up to 664 km (413 mi), with a fleet of over 300 vehicles. It is also operating 23 routes within the Brașov metropolitan area.

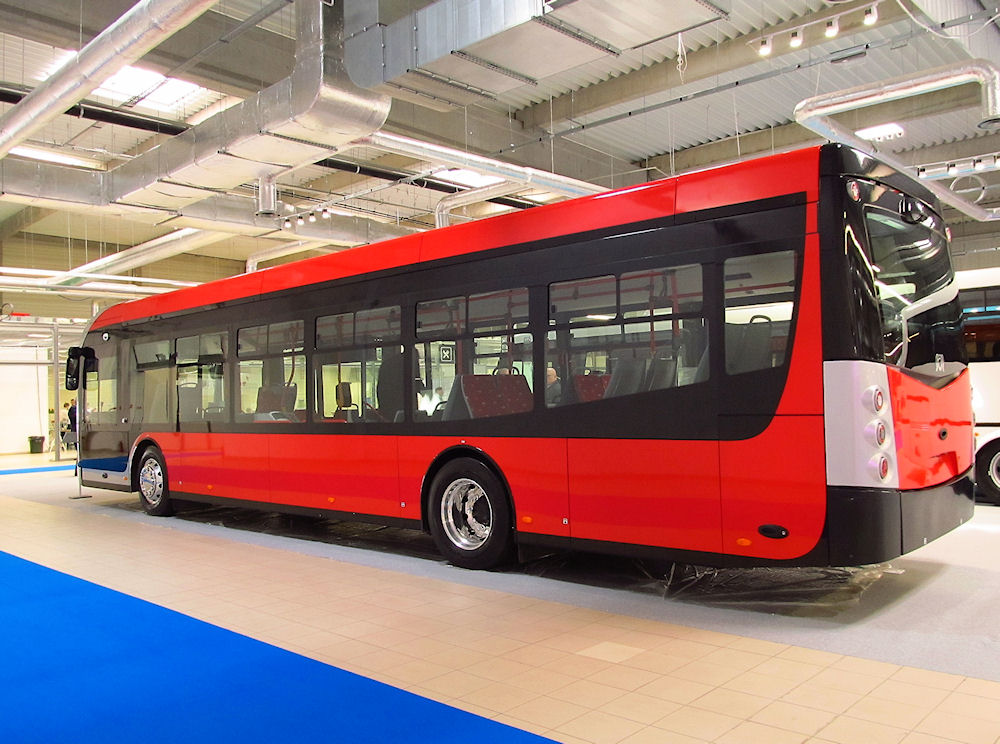
Autobuz SOR NS 12

== History ==
The following is a chronological list of events related to road or rail transport in and around Brașov, as well as relevant historical information.

The administrative divisions and predominant/official languages consistently change over time; in Saxon cities and villages like Brașov, German was predominant until the late 19th and early 20th centuries, when Romanian and for a few decades, Hungarian, increase in use, ultimately attaining a combined 95.2% in 2011. Except for 'Brașov', the names used are intended to be the ones most common in their day.

=== Beginnings ===
- 1830–1840: The first intra-city means of public transportation appear in Brașov – hackneys and carriages with one or two horses, built by Saxon craftsmen. They regularly waited for customers in Marktplatz and could carry 1-4 persons with luggage, towards the other three areas of town: Blumenau, Altstadt, Șchei.
- 1846–1866: Drumul Brașovului (the Brașov Road), between Câmpina, Wallachia, and Brașov, is built. Today, it is part of DN1.
- 1848: First intercity public transport across the Carpathian Mountains is made available by the local Franz Körner, who sets up a fast carriage route between Brașov and Bucharest.
- 1856–1859: Körner opens another line, Brașov–Bucharest–Giurgiu, which operated weekly and could carry 8-10 people with luggage.
- 1864–1867: The road from Brașov to Reps is built.
- 1890–1895: The first lines using the famous Landau carriages open up. They left daily for Siebendörfer, Zuisendorf and Törzburg for the price of 5 Austro-Hungarian florins.
- 1892–1900: On 7 March 1892, the first suburban railway of current-day Romania was opened between Bartolomeu and Siebendörfer. 17 km long, it connected the city to the seven villages that now constitute the town of Săcele. Built with private funds between 1890 and 1892, by the Brașov–Háromszék Neighboring Railways Society, it functioned until 1960, when, following road infrastructure modernization, it was discontinued.
- 1900–1910: The city's population grew from 36,646 to 41,054 people.
- 1900–1920: Popularity of horse-drawn carriages drops dramatically as the suburban train's usage increases. The remaining 115 cabmen could still be found in Marktplatz and at Hotel Krone. Some of the regular routes they would take had fixed prices, while other were settled with the customer.

=== The first bus ===
- 1925: The first four buses to be used for urban transport are introduced in the city and leased to the Decei-Blaga company, based in Cluj. They ran on two lines, between Piața Unirii and the Brașov railway station (14 stops), and Piața Unirii and the Bartolomeu railway station (9 stops).
- 1926–1927: The city hall prepares the first Regulations for the circulation of buses in town. In 1926, there were nine bus owners, that obtained the lease for public transport. The Municipal Council limited the number of buses to 30, to avoid traffic accidents. The price of a ticket was 5 lei. Routes were established to Băile Zizin and Băile Vâlcele (three times a week, 20-40 lei/person), leaving from Piața Sfatului. Also, two trucks carried people and cargo to and from Bran (25 lei/person, departure times at 15:30 and 6:30 respectively). The carriage drivers from the 'Fulgerul' ('The Lightning') syndicate protested against the expansion of public transportation and asked that the number of buses be limited at 16.
- 1928: The prefecture and city police regulate bus circulation furthermore.
- 1929: Following complaints from nearby residents, the stop for inter-city connections in Piața Sfatului was moved on the corner of Ferdinand Boulevard and Gate Street (next to the current-day rectorship of the Transylvania University; it currently represents the Livada Poștei stop).
- 1930: The Brașov city hall wants to set up its own bus exploitation board and informs the owners that their lease ends on July 1. The Carriage Driver Society of Brașov, in an open letter to the local press, explain that after 100 years of service, the drivers' businesses have gone under, because of the suburban train, the 100 taxis and over 40 buses. They ask the city hall to be awarded the lease over the buses of Aurel Lazăr Decei (which was about to expire) and limit the number of carriages from 100 to 60.
- 1931: The City Hall abandons the idea of exploiting the buses by itself, because of the high cost of setting up the board, 25 million lei.
- 1938: In association with the city hall, Regia Întreprinderilor din Municipiul Brașov (the Brașov Enterprise Board, "R.I.M.B." for short) is established. Within it, there was a public transportation section, which was equipped with 35 buses serving three routes, totaling 17 km (11 mi): Prund-Astra, Prund-Railway Station and Prund–Bartolomeu. They would transport 5.4 million passenger per year.
- 1941: Projects were elaborated for the electrification of the Bartolomeu–Satulung suburban railway and for the Center–Astra bus line.
- 1944: At this point, R.I.M.B. had 12 buses and transported 3.2 million people.
- 1948: The first tracked ZIS-151 truck was introduced on the Prund–Poiana Brașov route (the 'old road'). Overall, the same number of buses, 12, transported 2.6 million people.
- 1951: The bus fleet has grown to 33, used on four routes to transport a total of 11 million persons.
- 1956: On the Prund–Poiana Brașov route, two trucks were now used (there would be three in 1962, and five in 1963). A total of 51 buses were used on 10 routes summing 56 km (35 mi). Alongside them, there were 10 taxis and 64 cargo trucks.

=== The first trolleybus ===
- 1959: The board operated 85 buses on 17 routes summing 112 km (70 mi), and 27 taxis. On May 1, Brașov became the second city in the country, after Bucharest, to operate a trolleybus line. Under the surveillance of Tulcea-born Petru Alexe Bâlbu, the line used a small, 28-seat, slightly dangerous MDT trolley built in the capital (to which another 17 would soon be added). It initially operated on 8 km from Șchei to the MÁV Railway Station, but was later extended to the Triaj area. The electrical rectifying station was built on 3-5 Verii Street.
- 1960: The Prund–Tractorul line is opened.
- 1961: Întreprinderea de Transporturi (Transportation Enterprise) is established by reorganizing Întreprinderea de Gospodărie Orășenească (City Management Enterprise). There were 163 buses (83 for intra-city usage, and 80 for external connections), 47 TV2E trolleys, 45 taxis, and 47 cargo trucks.
- 1963: The current Livada Poștei-Poiana Brașov road is opened, and several Škoda 706 RTO are added to the fleet.
- 1967: The trolleybus base in Sânpetru, capable of maintaining up to 120 trolleys, is opened.
- 1970–1975: Several distinctions are awarded by the state for Brașov's public transport system in this period (including 2nd place country-wide in 1972 and 1975). On January 1, 1975, the Transportation Enterprise transfers the 120 buses serving inter-city connections (5 towns and 12 communes) to the newly reorganized "Întreprinderea de Transporturi Auto" (serving the entire Brașov County).
- 1978: The Enterprise had a fleet of 600 vehicles serving 50 routes, summing 350 km (220 mi) and transporting 141 million passengers that year. It employed 2,500 people and achieved income worth 117 million lei. The following years, high-capacity buses would be added, as well as Škoda SM-11, Ikarus, and IK4, used on tourist routes.
- 1979: Construction begins on the new bus and taximeter base capable of maintaining 400 vehicles, along with the Enterprise's new headquarters. Also, this year marks the introduction of autotaxation on all urban routes, as well as a major reorganization and renaming to Întreprinderea Județeană de Transport Local Brașov (Brașov County Enterprise for Local Transportation).
- 1980:
  - On January 1, the fleet (county-wide) was composed of: 317 buses (total capacity 36,584), 190 trolleybuses (total capacity 17,189), 20 taximeters, 43 vans, 136 tipper trucks (total cargo capacity 2,538 tons) and 31 auxiliary vehicles.
  - There were 2,575 employees and 489 million lei in funds.
  - This year alone, 154.3 million (91 by bus and 63.3 by trolley) people and 4 million tons of cargo were transported.
  - 136.1 km (84.6 mi) of overhead wires existed; trolleybus routes summed to 83.8 km (52.1 mi), and bus routes to 275 km (171 mi) in Brașov and 45 km (28 mi) in Făgăraș.

=== The first tramway ===
- 1980–1987: Several objectives were achieved:
  - The bus and taximeter maintenance base (started in 1979) is finished in 1983. The headquarters is moved to the current address on Hărmanului Street nr. 49, from the previous 13 Decembrie Street nt. 17;
  - The maintenance spot on Cristianului Road opens in 1984;
  - Expansion of the trolleybus network on Griviței Boulevard (2.2 km), in the newly constructed Valea Cetății neighbourhood (5.4 km, opened July 15h, 1986) and near Casa Armatei (200 m, opened October 1986);
  - Opening on August 22, 1987, of stage I of the first tramway line (named 101), between Steagul Roșu–Rulmentul, on 13.1 km.

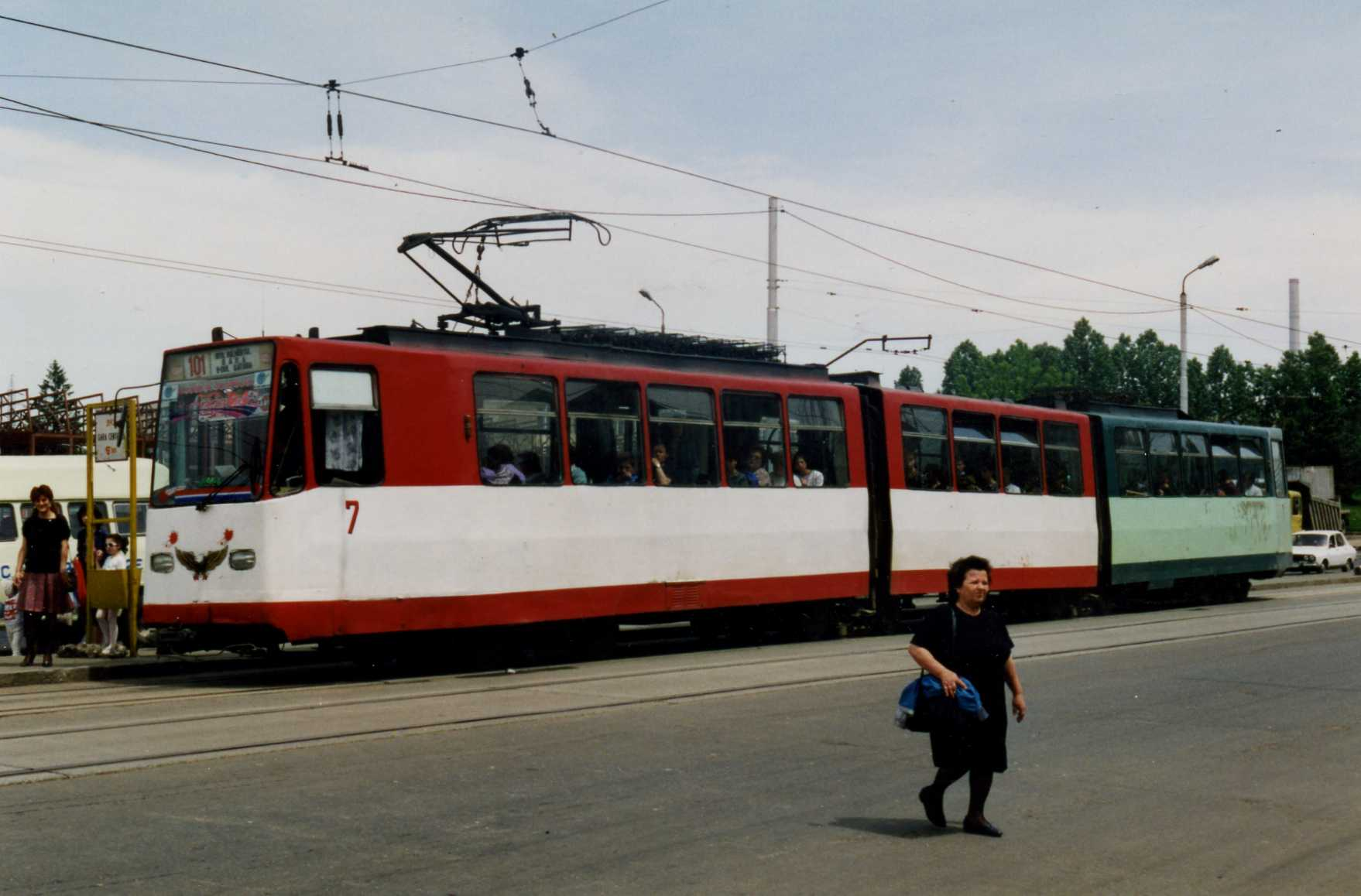
Brașov tram type V3A. The tram was opened in 1987 and ran until 2006 when it was replaced with a trolleybus line (Image taken in 1994)

- 1987:
  - The vehicle fleet is composed of a total of 876 vehicles: 182 buses, 209 trolleys, 5 trams, 50 taxis, 43 vans, 19 trucks, 227 tipper trucks, 5 minibuses, 31 trailers, 58 auxiliary.
  - The fleet served one tram and 19 trolley lines, and 16 bus routes in Brașov and 8 in Făgăraș.
  - The trolleybus overhead line network summed 77.5 km, trolley routes 229.6 km, and the buses, 340.5 km (of which 247.1 km in Brașov and 93.4 km in Făgăraș).
  - There were 2,390 employees, funds of 976 million lei, and revenues of 292 million lei.

== Description ==
=== Ticketing system ===
Tickets are used by inserting them into the ticket machine on board the bus, a trip is valid for 60 minutes since the ticket is used and can span multiple lines. Tickets and subscriptions and are occasionally validated by ticket inspectors, the on-the-spot fine for not having a valid ticket is 200 lei.

Ticket types and prices

All subscriptions are nominated, that is they are only valid accompanied by an ID card. Tickets (as well as the monthly 120 lei subscription) are not nominated.

Tickets
Type	Price	Availability
Two trips(Metropolitan)	8.00 (10.00 from the driver)lei	Metropolitan Area
Two trips(Interurban - trip within cities in the Metropolitan Area, other than Brașov)	4.00 (5.00 from the driver) lei	Metropolitan Area (except Brașov)

Subscriptions
Type	All lines	Availability
1 day	12.00 lei	Metropolitan Area
3 days	30.00 lei	Metropolitan Area
One month(Urban)	80 lei (with holder's name) 120 lei (without holder's name)	Brașov only
One month(Metropolitan)	150 lei	Metropolitan Area
One month(Interurban)	80 lei (with holder's name) 120 lei (without holder's name)	Metropolitan Area (except Brașov)

== Vehicle fleet ==
=== Current fleet (including retired vehicles) ===
Buses
Model	Origin	Introduced	Length (meters)	Capacity (passengers)	Units	Notes
MAN SL 223	Germany (Note: Built by MAN Türkiye in Ankara, Turkey.)	2002	12		10	
MAN SL 263	Germany	2006	12		5	
MAN SL 283	Germany	2006	12		56	
MAN SG 313	Germany	2006	12		25	
Mercedes-Benz O 345 Conecto	Germany (Note: Built by Mercedes-Benz Türk in Istanbul, Turkey.)	2004	12		15	
Mercedes-Benz O 530 Citaro	Germany	2016	12		10	Pre-owned, formerly operated in Switzerland (Note: Solothurn, Schwyz, and Zurich.)
Mercedes-Benz O 405 G	Germany	2008			11	Pre-owned, formerly operated in Switzerland (Note: Solothurn, Zug, Basel, and Bern.)
MAZ 103	Belarus	2004			45	
BMC Probus 215 SCB	Turkey	2006			28	
BMC Procity SLF 320	Turkey	2012	12		15	
BMC Neocity	Turkey	2017	8		6	
Menarinibus Citymood 10	Italy (Note: Built by Karsan in Bursa, Turkey .)	2019	10		30	
Menarinibus Citymood 12	Italy	2019	12		40	
Menarinibus Citymood 18	Italy	2019	18		35	
Trolleybuses
Model	Origin	Introduced	Length (meters)	Capacity (passengers)	Units	Notes
Solaris Trollino 18	Poland	2020	18		51 (Note: Other additional 25 units on order.)	Powered by Škoda and Medcom
Renault–Alsthom ER 100 2H	France	2011			10	Pre-owned, formerly operated in France (Note: Limoges and St. Etienne.)
Electric buses
Model	Origin	Introduced	Length (meters)	Capacity (passengers)	Units	Notes
SOR NS 12	Czech Republic	2020	12		60	
SOR EBN 8	Czech Republic	2021	8		10	
Karsan e-ATA 18	Turkey	2022	18		12	

=== Gallery ===
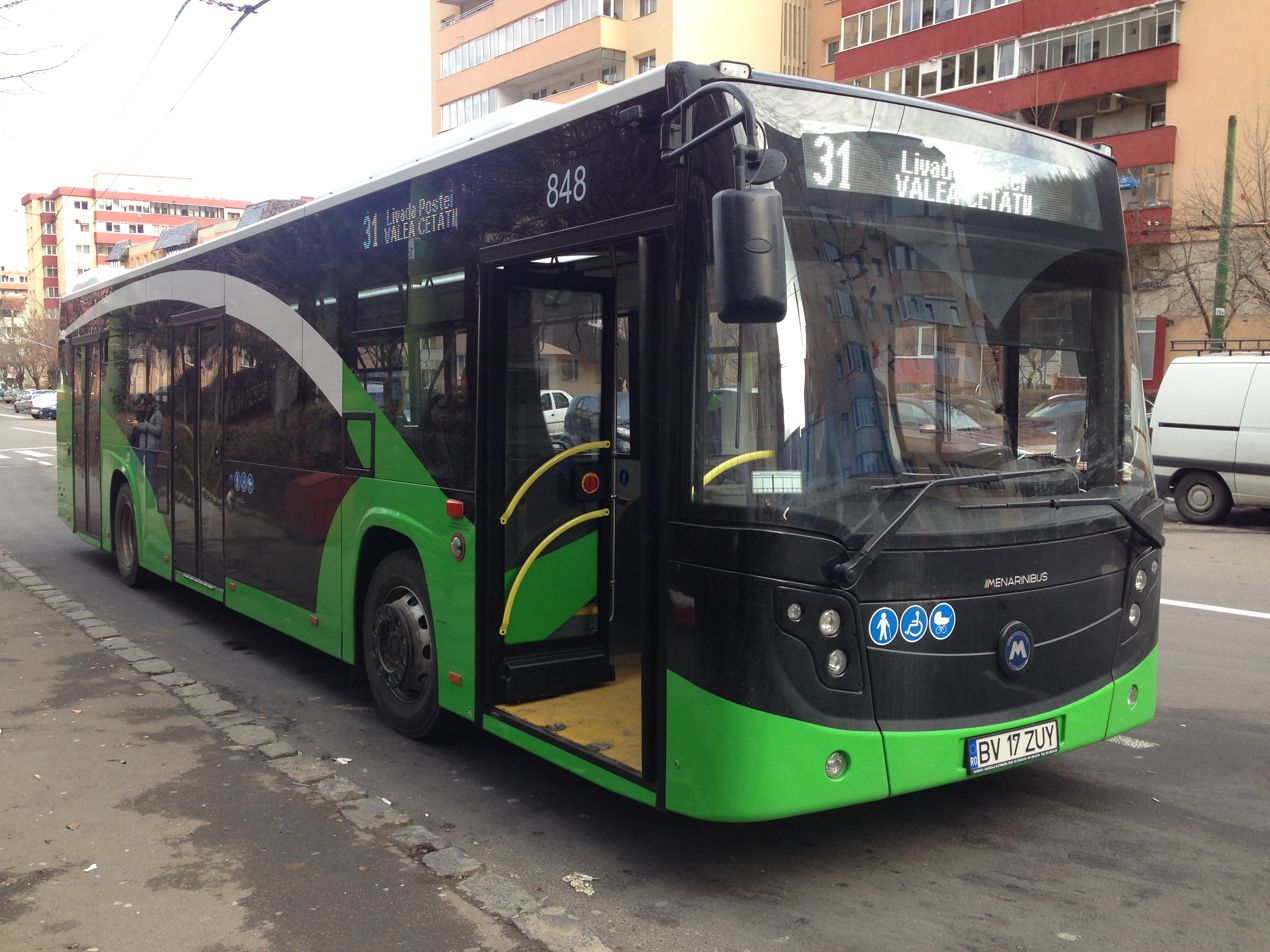
Menarinibus Citymood 12

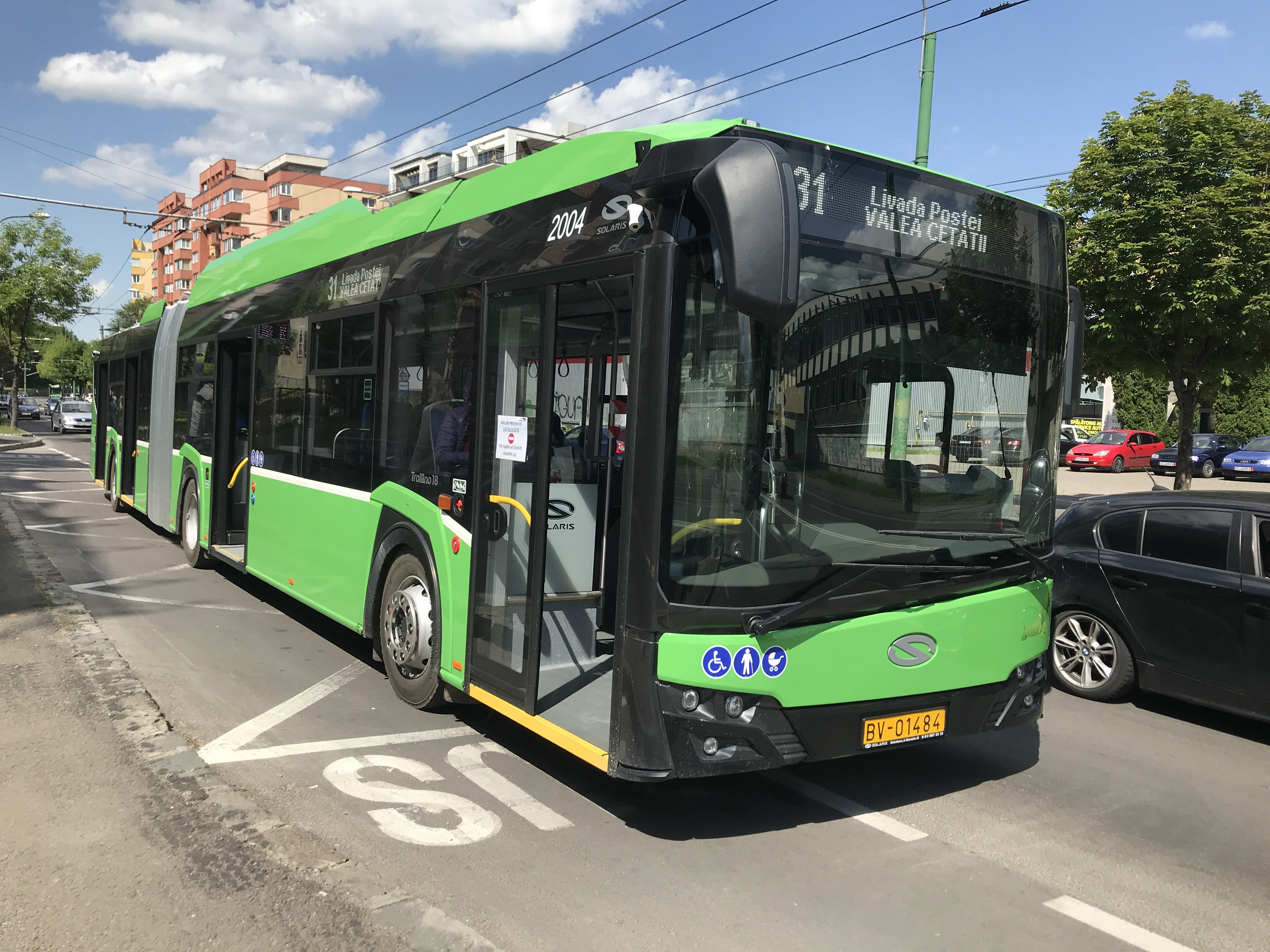
Solaris Trollino 18

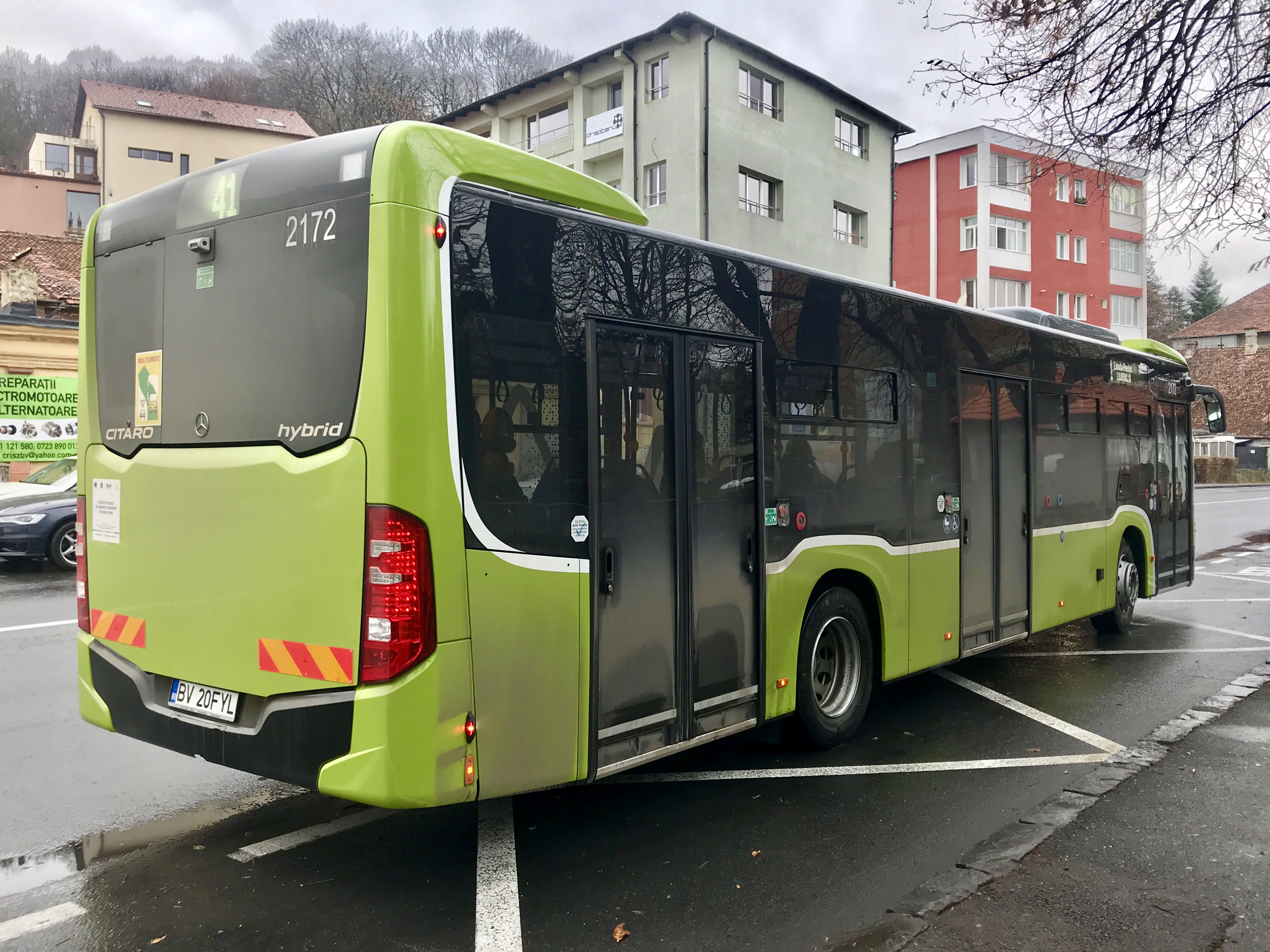
Mercedes-Benz Citaro Hybrid

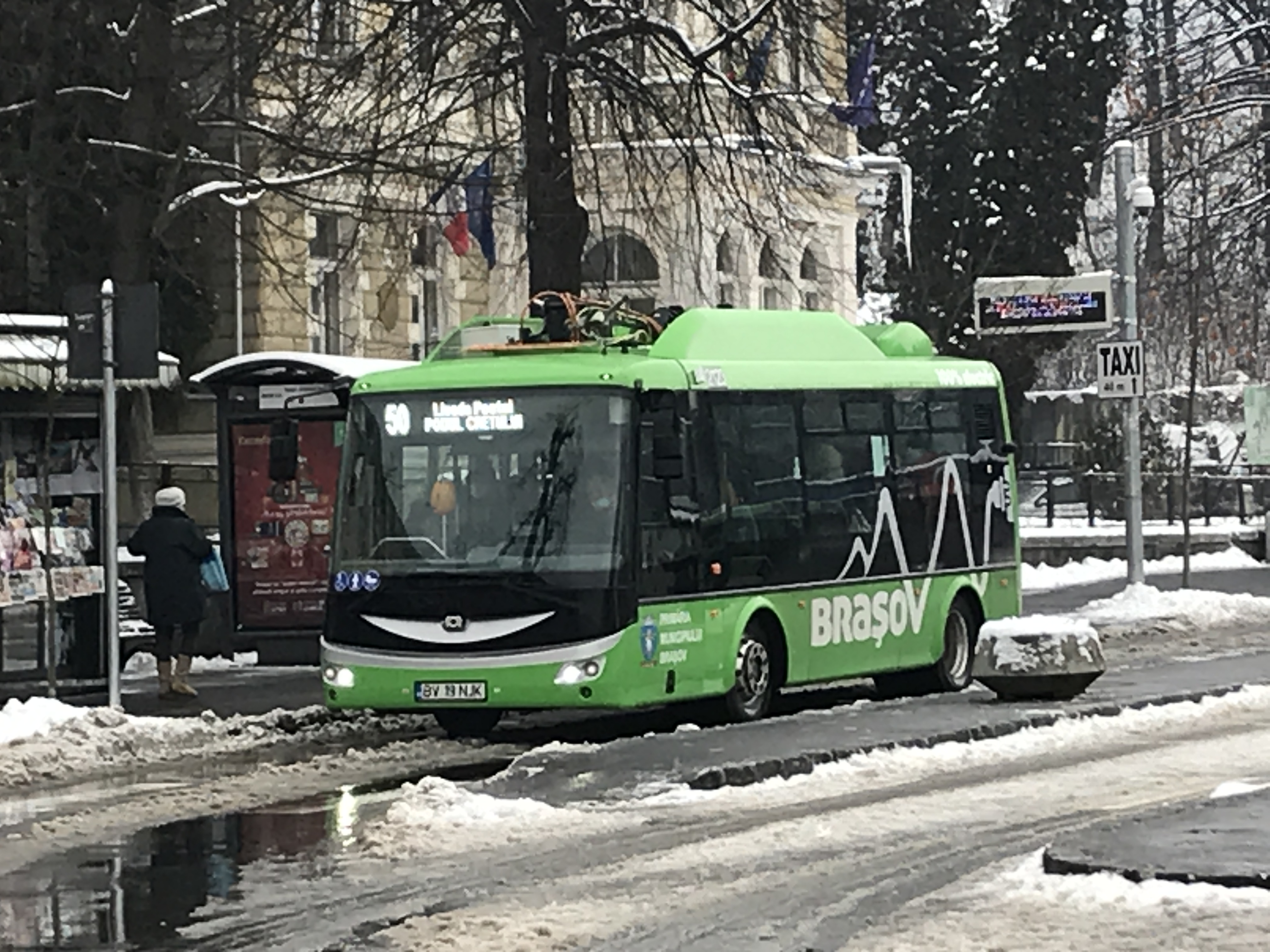
SOR EBN 8

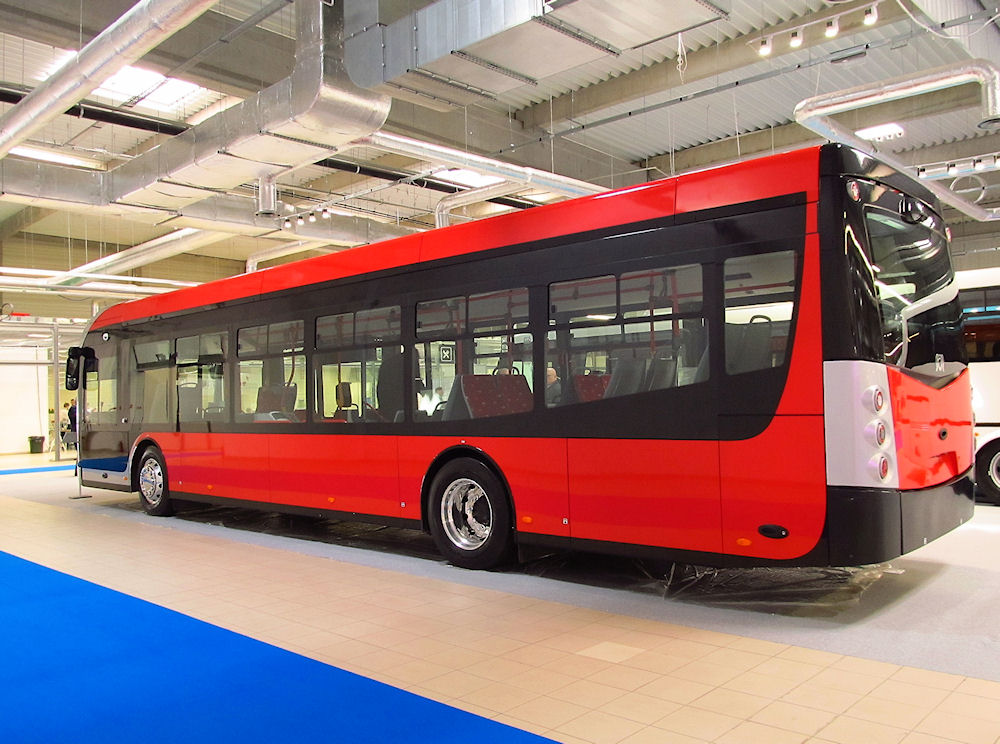
SOR NS 12 electric

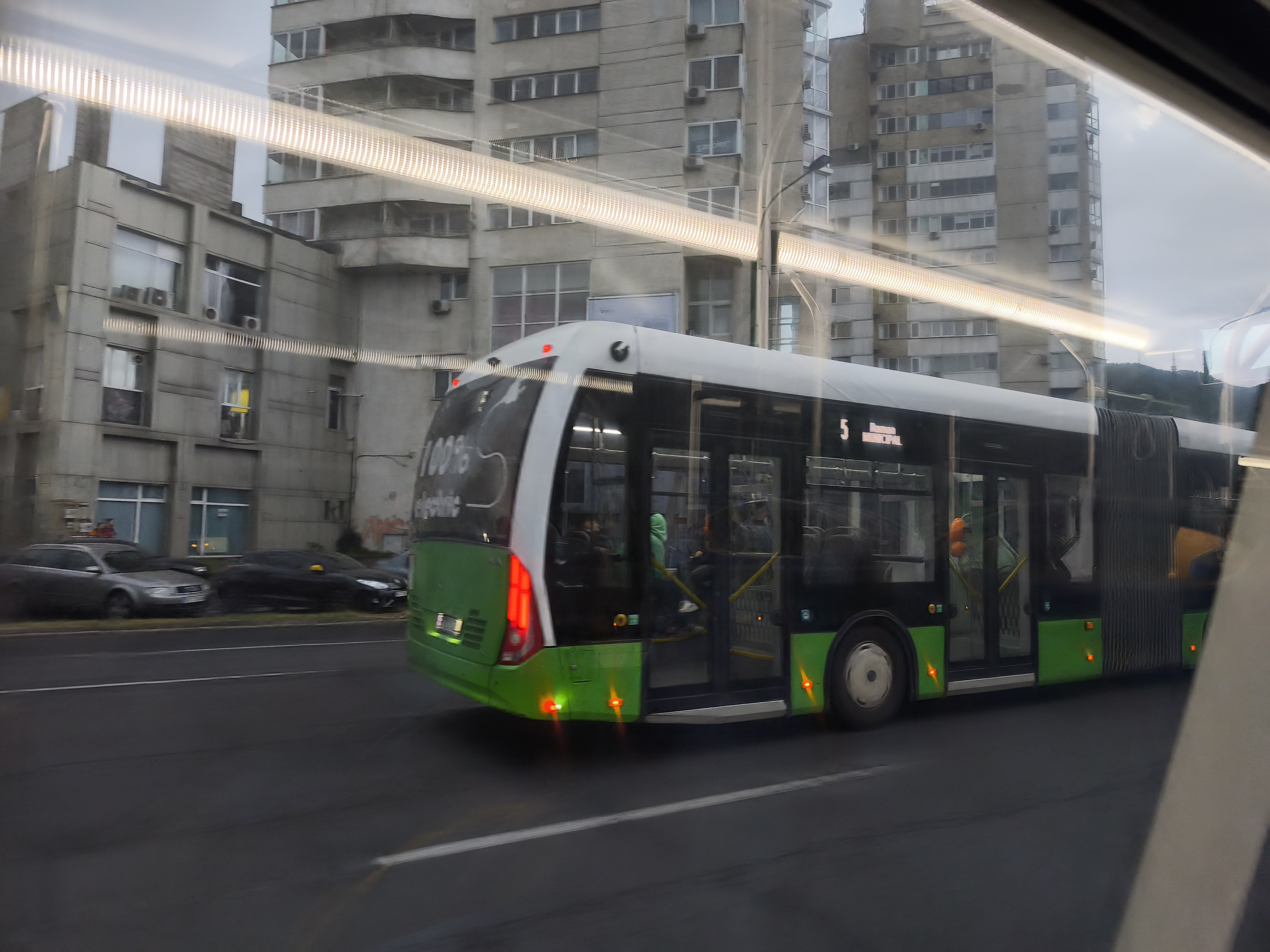
Karsan E-ATA 18 Electric

== Network ==
=== Current routes ===
The columns of the list table below represent:

- Line - The number or name of the route;
- Type - The type of vehicle that the line uses (bus or trolley);
- Opened - The year when the line with this name was operated for the first time, regardless of subsequent route modifications;
- Modified - The last time a modification (adding/subtracting stations, other major changes) occurred;
- Route - A short description of the route, it does not include all the stations;
- Stops - The total number of stops performed in a round trip; this includes the terminal station once;
- Length - The length in kilometres of a round trip;
- Avg. distance - The average distance in metres between two stops;

=== Urban routes ===
Line	Type	Opened	Modified	Route	Stops	Length	Avg. distance
A1	Bus	2023	-	Aeroport Brasov - Livada Poștei - Gară	-	-	-
1	Trolley	1959	2020	Livada Poștei - Triaj	21	12.85	612
2	Trolley	1960	2020	Livada Poștei - Rulmentul	19	10.8	600
2b	Bus	1966	2020	Livada Poștei - (Tractorul nou) - Rulmentul	12.6	25	
3	Trolley	1961	2008	Valea Cetății - Griviței - Stadionul Tineretului	27	13.9	515
4	Bus	1961	2022	Pe Tocile - Livada Poștei - Gară	13	7	538
5	Bus	1961	2005	Roman SA - Centrul Civic - Primărie - Stadionul Municipal	29	17.1	590
5M	Bus	2012	-	Stadionul Municipal - Depozite (- Avicola Măgurele)	16	18.9	1,181
6	Trolley	1962	2020	Livada Poștei - Saturn	20	11.4	570
7	Trolley	1963	1969	Roman SA - Onix - Rulmentul	28	15.8	564
8	Trolley	1972	2006	Saturn - Gară - Rulmentul	26	14	538
9	Bus	1962	2005	Rulmentul - Independenței - Stadionul Municipal	29	14.9	514
10	Trolley	1980	2013	Valea Cetății - Centrul Civic - Triaj	31	16.21	523
14	Bus	1972	2012	Livada Poștei - Lungă - Fabrica de Var	14	6.2	443
15	Bus	1984	2024	Avantgarden - Auchan Coresi - Triaj	21	11.30	538
16	Bus	1966	2007	Livada Poștei - Griviței - Stadionul Municipal - Cărămidăriei	19	11.7	616
17	Bus	1992	-	Livada Poștei - Calea București - Noua	30	19.11	637
17b	Bus	2008	2011	Gară - Saturn - Dâmbul Morii - Timișul de Jos	32	26.3	822
18	Bus	-	-	Bariera Bartolomeu - Feldioarei - Stupini - Fundaturii - IAR Ghimbav	37	23.79	643
20	Bus	1966	-	Livada Poștei - Poiana Brașov	10	24.2	2,420
21	Bus	1975	2003	Triaj - Saturn - Noua	36	20.81	578
22	Bus	1961	1973	Saturn - Centrul Civic - Iuliu Maniu - Stadionul Tineretului	27	14.2	526
23	Bus	2005	2021	Saturn - Gară - Stadionul Municipal-(ILF)	29	16.21	559
23b	Bus	2005	2007	Triaj - Gară - Stadionul Municipal	24	15.79	658
24	Bus	2007	2018	Livada Poștei - Stadionul Municipal - Stupinii Noi - Baciului CL	22	14.17	644
25	Bus	2012	2021	Roman - Gară - Stadionul Tineretului - Avantgarden	36	18	500
28	Bus	-	-	Livada Poștei - Stadionul Municipal - Fundaturii - IAR Ghimbav	42	25.49	607
29	Bus	1977	2023	Bartolomeu Nord - Independenței - Gara Centrală	23	11.10	483
31	Trolley	1986	2020	Livada Poștei - Centrul Civic - Valea Cetății	22	11.79	536
32	Bus	1961	2023	Coresi - Gară - Hidro A - Valea Cetății	21	9.41	448
33	Trolley	1981	1994	Valea Cetății - Roman SA	17	7.5	441
34	Bus	2006	2012	Livada Poștei - Zizinului - CET - Timiș Triaj	33	18.32	555
34b	Bus	2006	2020	Livada Poștei - Zizinului - Izvor	29		
35	Bus	-	1997	Gară - Calea București - Noua	29	16.91	583
36	Bus	2002	2024	Livada Poștei - 13 Decembrie - Independenței	23	9.2	529
37	Bus	2002	2017	Hidro A - Gară - Craiter	20	11.2	560
40	Bus	2004	2023	Gară - Griviței - Stupini	46	26.96	586
41	Bus	2004	2011	Livada Poștei - Cimitirul Central - Stupini	33	17.69	536
50	Bus	2006	2022	Camera de Comerț - Pe Tocile - Solomon	12	6	500
52	Bus	2008	2016	Panselelor - Roman - Primărie - Pe Tocile	18	14.14	544
53	Bus	2018	-	Facultate Constructii - Panselelor	7	-	-
54	Bus	2020	2022	Hidro A - Autogara 3 - Liziera Brașov - Triaj	-	-	-
55	Bus	2024	-	Livada Poștei - Cetatuie	4	-	411
56	Bus	2024	-	Roman SA - Saturn - Cimitir Misunica	15	-	
60	Bus	2017	2018	Silver Mountain - Telecabina Poiana Brașov	-	-	-
100	Bus	2013	-	Poiana Brasov - Gară	-	-	

=== Metropolitan routes ===
Line	Type	Opened	Modified	Route	Stops	Length	Avg. distance
110	Bus	2019	2023	Stadionul Municipal - Cristian Tineretului	23	20.3	-
120	Bus	2019	2023	Stadionul Municipal - Cristian - Vulcan	25	21.8	-
130	Bus	2021	-	Stadionul Municipal - Cristian - Râșnov	34	30.3	-
131	Bus	2021	2023	Stadionul Municipal - Cristian - Rasnov Romacril	31	29.4	-
140	Bus	2023	-	Stadionul Municipal - Cristian - Râșnov - Zărnești	50	53.2	-
210	Bus	2019	-	Stadionul Municipal - Ghimbav	18	15.7	-
220	Bus	2019	-	Stadionul Municipal - Ghimbav - Codlea Nord	19	26.2	-
310	Bus	2019	2023	Gara Brașov - Griviței- Hălchiu - Satu Nou	33	-	-
320	Bus	2021	2022	Gara Brașov - Griviței - Feldioara - Rotbav	34	51.7	-
410	Bus	2021	-	Rulmentul - Subcetate	5	6.4	-
411	Bus	2020	2021	Rulmentul - Sânpetru Residence	12	-	-
412	Bus	2021	-	Rulmentul - Morii Sânpetru	14	9	-
420	Bus	2019	-	Rulmentul - Sânpetru - Bod Colonie	36	26.8	-
511	Bus	2021	2023	Gara Brașov - Hărman - Podu Oltului	29	-	-
520	Bus	2019	2022	Gara Brașov - Harman - Prejmer - Lunca Câlnicului	40	-	-
540	Bus	2020	2023	Gară Brașov - Harman - Prejmer - Teliu - Vama Buzăului	56	-	-
610	Bus	2021	-	Roman - Izvor - Tărlungeni - Zizin - Purcăreni	38	33.4	-
611	Bus	2021	-	Roman - Izvor - Cărpiniș - Tărlungeni	36	37.9	-
612	Bus	2021	-	Roman - Izvor - Tărlungeni - Cărpiniș - Zizin - Purcăreni	41	39.2	-
620	Bus	2021	2024	Gemenii - Izvor - Tărlungeni- Budila	21	50.3	-
710	Bus	2023	-	Roman - Săcele	26	20.6	-
711	Bus	2023	-	Roman - Săcele - Gârcini	28	21.2	-
810	Bus	2021	-	Roman - Predeal	36	52.7	-

==== Statistics ====
	Buses	Trolleybuses	Total
Number of lines	67	9	76
Road used	km	21.2 km	+ 21.2 km
Total route length	603.2 km	94.8 km	698 km
Average route length	15.08 km	13.54 km	14.85 km
Average stop distance	621 m	543 m	610 m
Total stops made	1,020	174	1,194

Note: "Road used" denotes the distance of the roads on which buses/trolleys travel (it's an approximate value), while "Total route length" is the sum of one round trip of each of the lines implied.

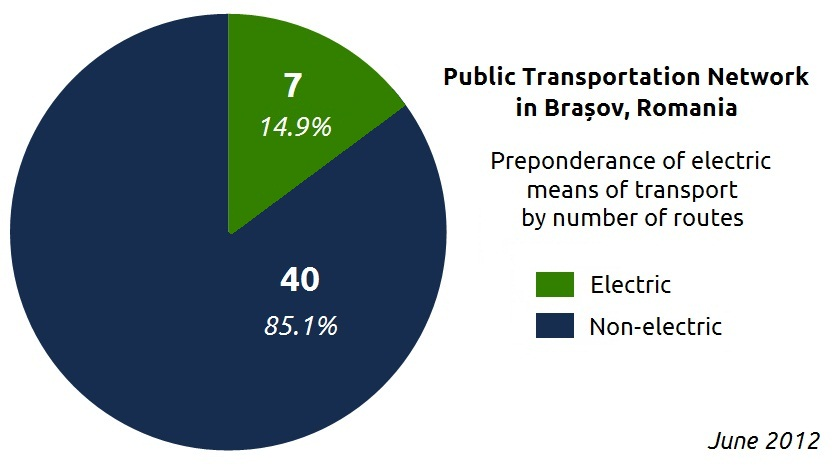

Statistics made in June 2012

=== Discontinued routes ===
This table uses the same format as the one above, with two exceptions: the fourth column (Closed) indicates the year when the line (not necessarily the route itself) ceased to operate, and there is an additional column for Notes.

Line	Type	Opened	Closed	Route	Stops	Length	Avg. distance	Notes
101	Tram	1987	2006	Saturn - Gară - Rulmentul	20	13.4	670	Operated between August 22, 1987, and November 18, 2006

== Notes ==
Nota bene
