= Durbav =

Durbav Sânpetru
- Location within Romania

Location
- Country: Romania
- Counties: Brașov County
- Villages: Săcele, Sânpetru

Physical characteristics
- Source: Piatra Mare Mountains
  - location: Săcele
  - coordinates: 45°35′10″N 25°40′15″E
- Mouth: Ghimbășel
  - location: Sânpetru
  - coordinates: 45°43′48″N 25°36′16″E
  - elevation: 507 m (1,663 ft)
- Length: 21 km (13 mi)
- Basin size: 45 km^{2} (17 sq mi)

Basin features
- Progression: Ghimbășel→ Bârsa→ Olt→ Danube→ Black Sea
- Tributaries
  - left: Cernat, Gârbău

The Durbav or Sânpetru is a right tributary of the river Ghimbășel in Romania. Its source is in the Piatra Mare Mountains. It discharges into the Ghimbășel in Sânpetru. Its length is 21 km (13 mi) and its basin size is 45 km^{2} (17 sq mi).
