= Valea Cetății (Brașov) =

- Location within Romania

Location
- Country: Romania
- Counties: Brașov County
- Cities: Brașov

Physical characteristics
- Source: Postăvarul Massif
- Mouth: Canalul Timiș
  - location: Brașov
  - coordinates: 45.642°N 25.617°E

Basin features
- Progression: Canalul Timiș→ Ghimbășel→ Bârsa→ Olt→ Danube→ Black Sea

The Valea Cetății is a small river in the city of Brașov, Romania. It is intercepted by the Canalul Timiș (Timiș Canal). Its source is in the Postăvarul Massif.
