= Pârâul Cheii =

Pârâul Cheii Valea Cheii
- Location within Romania

Location
- Country: Romania
- Counties: Brașov County

Physical characteristics
- Source: Postăvarul Massif
  - coordinates: 45°33′24″N 25°33′52″E
  - elevation: 1,131 m (3,711 ft)
- Mouth: Pârâul Mic
  - coordinates: 45°33′14″N 25°29′35″E
  - elevation: 700 m (2,300 ft)
- Length: 7 km (4.3 mi)
- Basin size: 41 km^{2} (16 sq mi)

Basin features
- Progression: Pârâul Mic→ Ghimbășel→ Bârsa→ Olt→ Danube→ Black Sea
- Tributaries
  - left: Tocilița
  - right: Poiana

The Pârâul Cheii (also: Valea Cheii) is a right tributary of the Pârâul Mic in Romania. It flows into the Pârâul Mic southeast of Râșnov. Its length is 7 km (4.3 mi) and its basin size is 41 km^{2} (16 sq mi).
