= Bod Transmitter =

Bod Transmitting Station
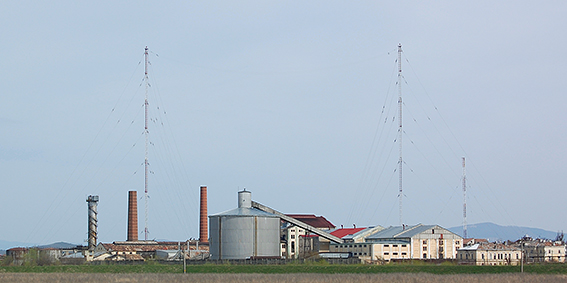
- The transmitting station in Bod

- Location within Romania
- Location: Bod, Brașov, Romania
- Mast height: 253m, later 250m
- Coordinates: 45°45′17″N 25°36′24″E
- Built: 1933

The Bod Transmitter (also known as the Brașov Transmitter) is a longwave radio transmitter near Bod, Romania. It broadcasts Radio Antena Satelor (daytime) and Radio România Actualități (at night) on 153 kHz.

The transmitter was designed by the engineer Gheorghe Cartianu-Popescu and built in 1933–34. At the time it was one of the tallest structures in Europe. The transmitter, the first longwave radio station in Eastern Europe, was inaugurated in the presence of Guglielmo Marconi.

The Bod Transmitter currently operates on a frequency of 153 kHz with an output power of 200 kW. During the 80's and 90's, its power varied between 400 and 800 kW (nighttime and daytime). It uses as its antenna a T-antenna hung up on two 250 metres (820 feet) tall guyed masts.

Until 1985, it operated on 155 kHz, and until 1965 on 160 kHz. Between 1936 and 1965 the power was 150 KW. In 1965, the old mast and transmitter were decommissioned, and the new antenna and new Thomson transmitter (1200 kW) were put in service.

Since 2003, a new solid-state transmitter from Harris was installed. The new transmitter is Digital Radio Mondiale compatible and has digital modulation. Despite its lower power, only 200 kW, it provides good coverage for Romania (can be received all over Romania), and border countries. During nighttime, it can be received all across Europe.

There is also a medium wave transmitter on the site.

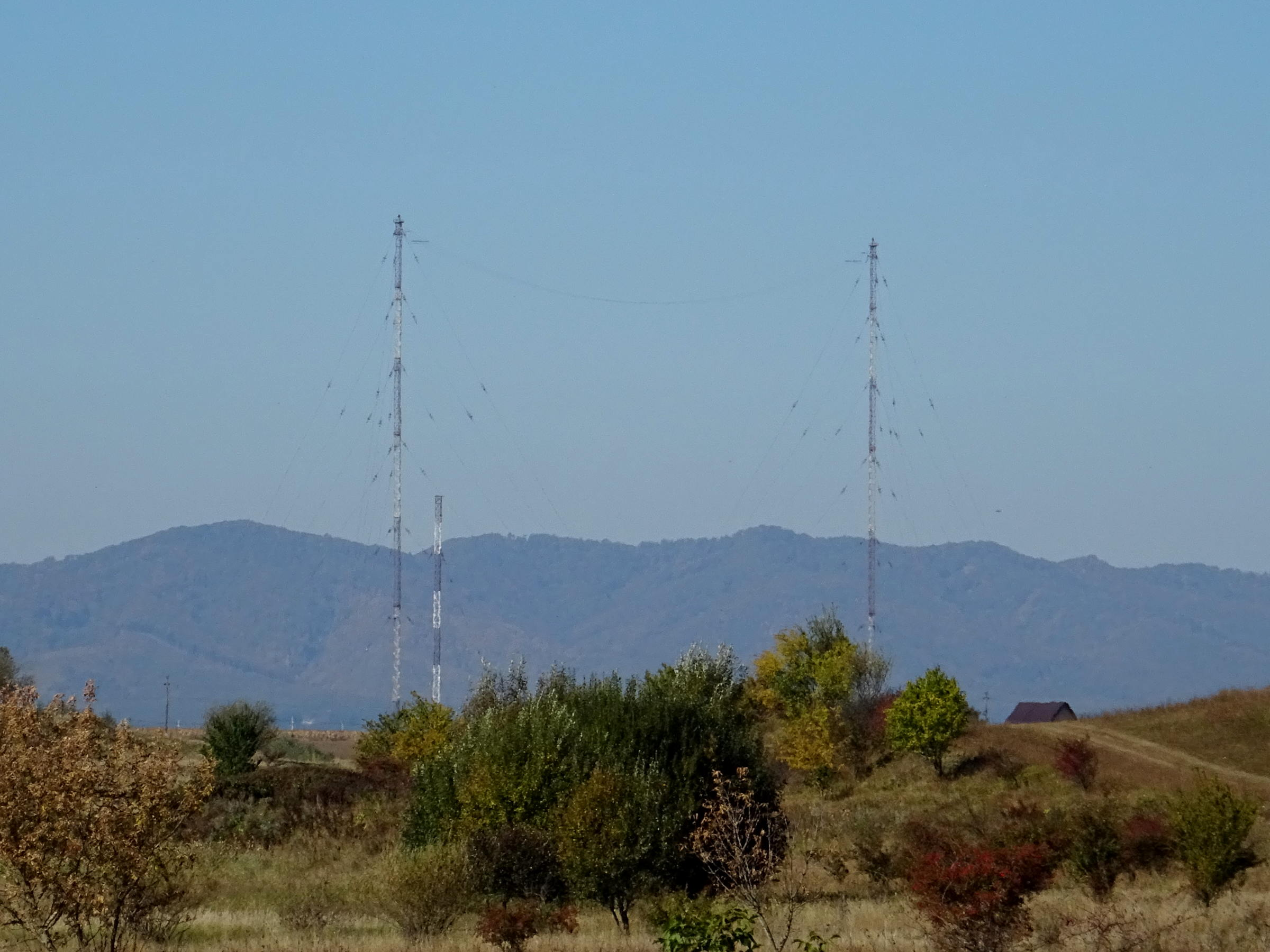
Another view

== See also ==
- List of famous transmission sites
