= Poiana Brașov =

Locality in Romania

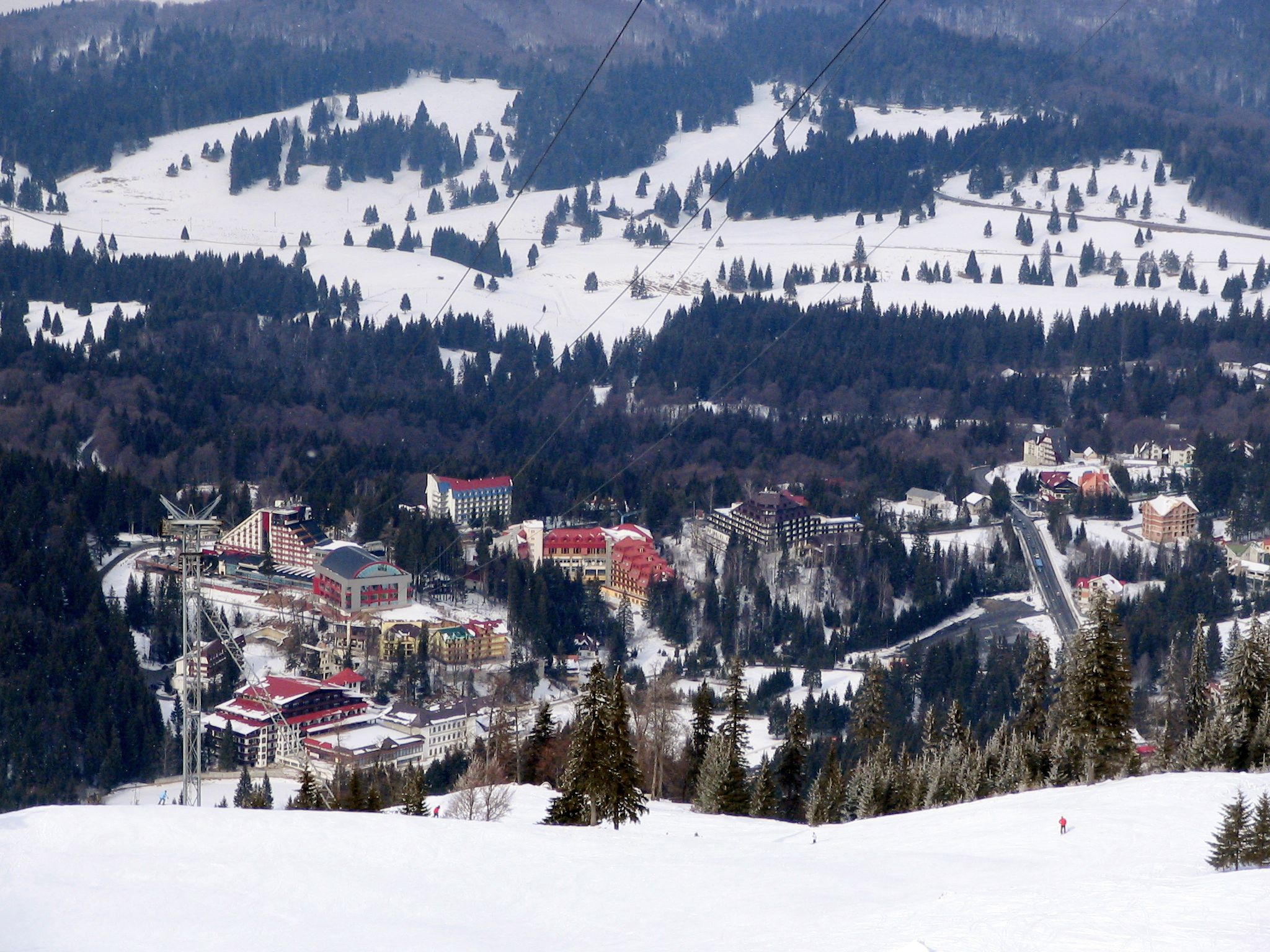
- Interactive map of Poiana Brașov
- Location: Postăvarul Massif, Romania
- Nearest city: Brașov
- Coordinates: 45°35′50″N 25°33′07″E
- Top elevation: 1,799 m (5,902 ft)
- Base elevation: 1,020 m (3,350 ft)
- Trails: 12
- Longest run: 4,752 m (15,591 ft) (Drumul Roșu)
- Lift system: 2 aerial tramways 2 chairlift 5 ski lifts 1 gondola
- Website: www.poianabrasov.com

Poiana Brașov (Romanian pronunciation: [poˈjana braˈʃov], German: Schulerau; Hungarian: Brassópojána) is a neighborhood of Brașov and a Romanian ski resort.

After the 2010s modernization, the ski area has expanded from 50 hectares (120 acres) to 80 hectares (200 acres) and the slope’s length increased from 13.8 km (8.6 mi) to 23.9 km (14.9 mi). Most slopes now have snow cannons installed. In 2013, Poiana Brașov hosted figure skating, alpine skiing, and short track in the European Youth Olympic Winter Festival.

The resort is located at about 1,020 metres (3,350 feet) above sea level near the city of Brașov in Romania and is easily accessible by road. Regular buses operated by Brașov Transit (RATBV) serve the 12 km (7.5 mi) route between Brașov and Poiana Brașov (lines 20 and 100). The resort also runs minibuses that take visitors from hotels to the base of the ski, these cover areas where people can hike or take a cable car to the Cristianu Mare or Postăvaru summits.

Poiana Brașov has a temperate-continental climate. The average temperature in summer is 20 °C and in winter -4 °C. There is a snow cover of about 50–60 cm which lasts from mid-November until mid-March, for about 120 days a year. However, snowfalls can occur from the end of September.

Poiana Brașov is host to several hotels and restaurants, the majority of which cater to foreign tourists. Two of the better known restaurants are Șura Dacilor (The Dacians' Barn) and Coliba Haiducilor (The Outlaws' Shack). There is also one nightclub, Capra Neagră (The Chamois).

== Main Slopes ==
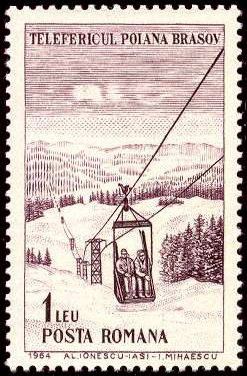

There are 7 main ski/snowboard slopes in the resort:

slope	length	width	type	lift system
Bradul	430 m	70 m	beginner	ski lift magic cover
Stadion	325 me	30 m	beginner	ski lift
Drumul Roșu	4752 m	22 m	intermediate	aerial tramway ski lift
Sulinar	2820 m	35 m	intermediate	ski lift
Kanzel	297 m	50 m	advanced	ski lift aerial tramway
Subteleferic	2200 m	35 m	advanced	ski lift
Lupului	2605 m	28 m	advanced	ski lift gondola

== Gallery ==
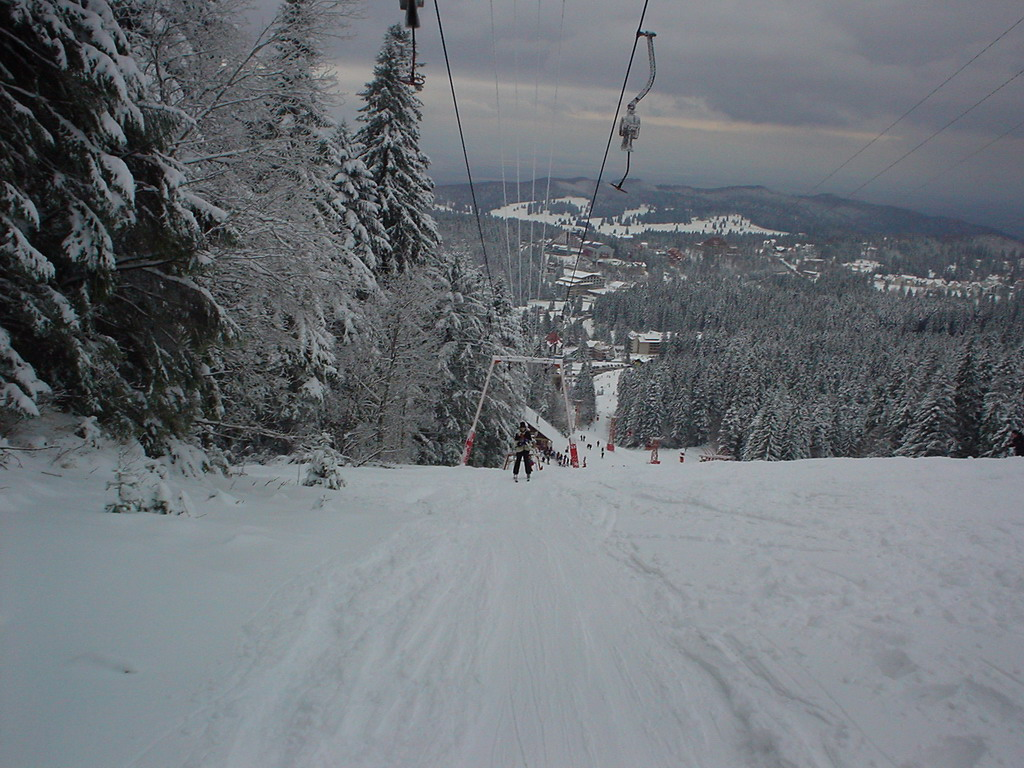

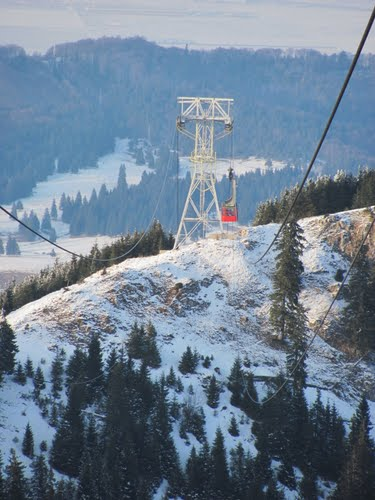

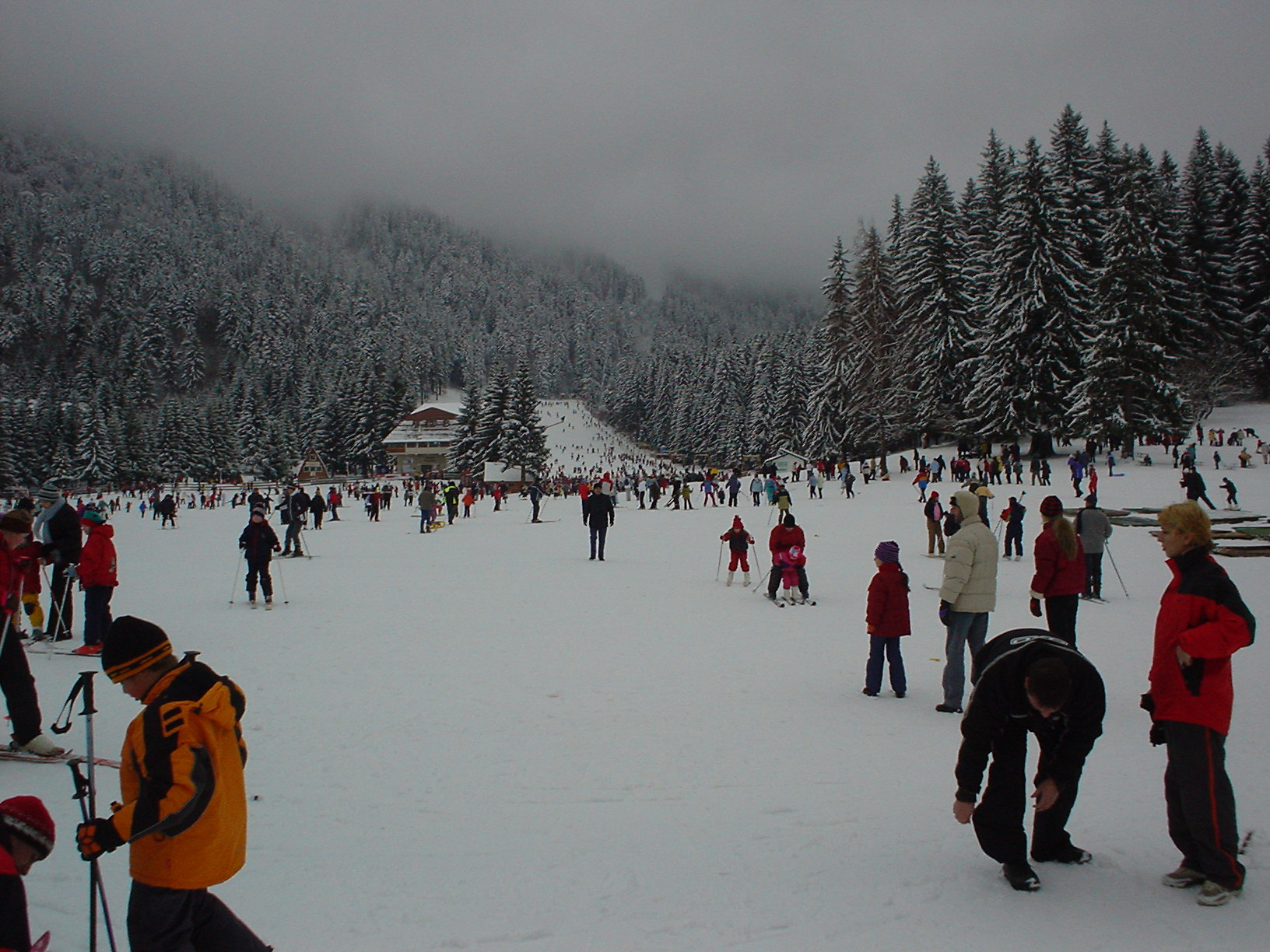

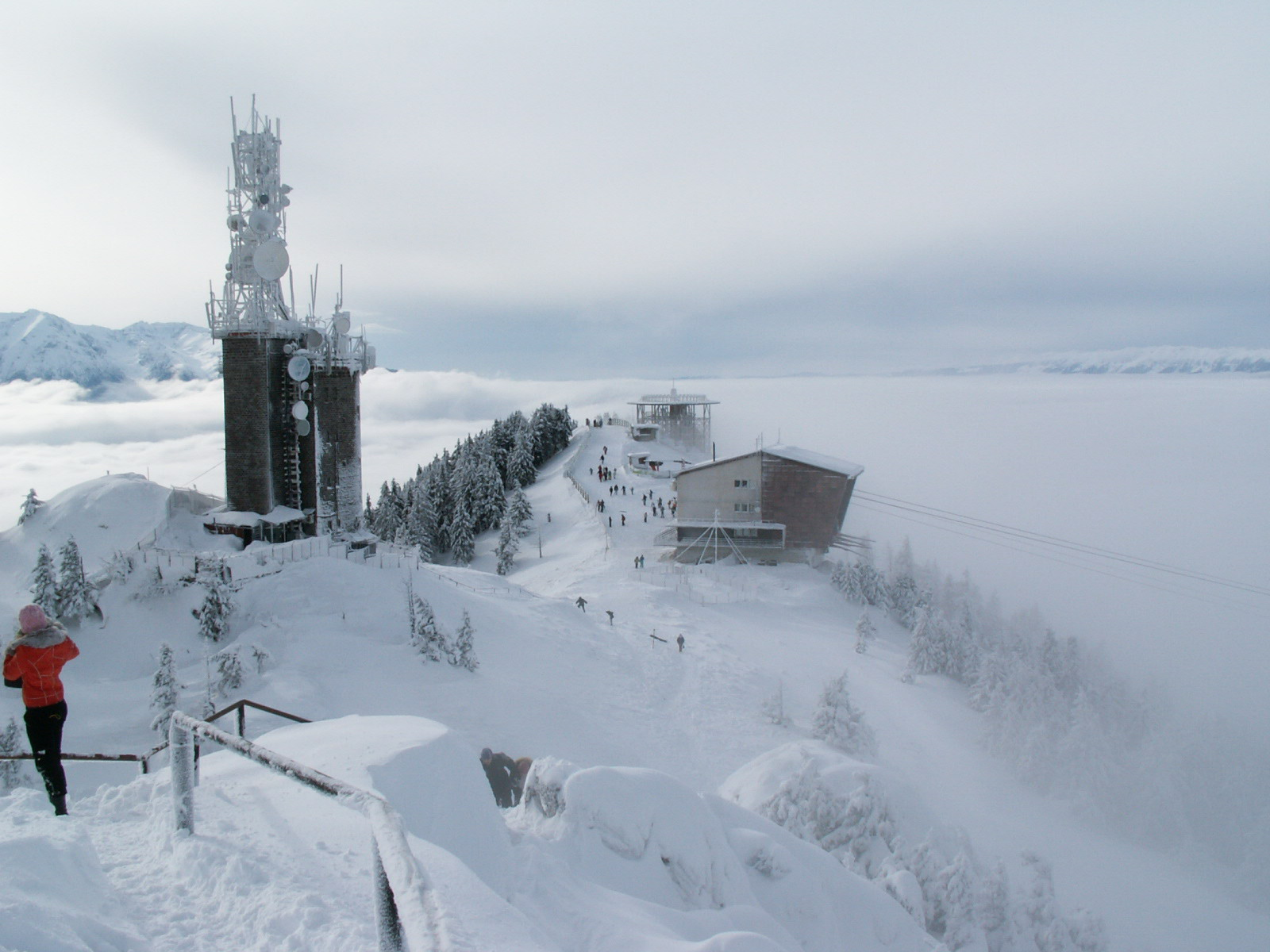

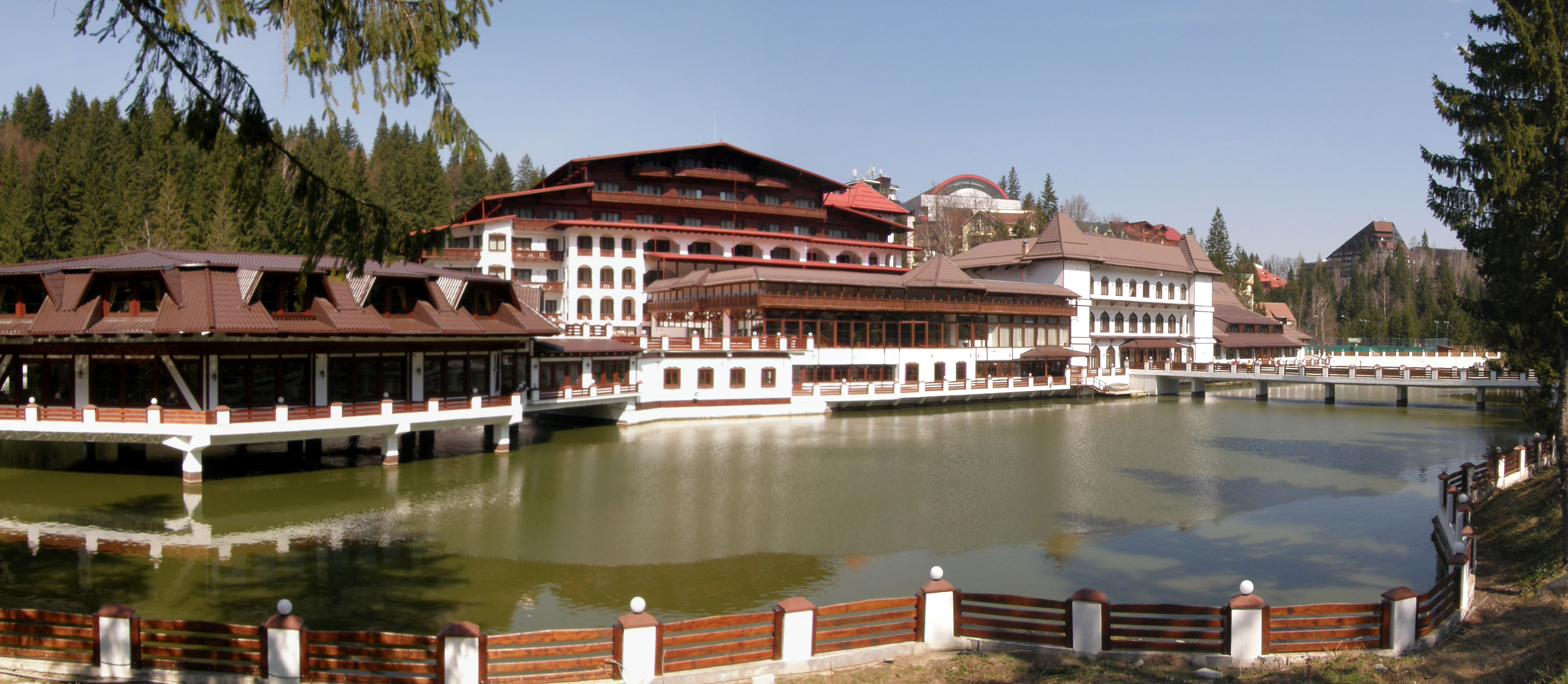

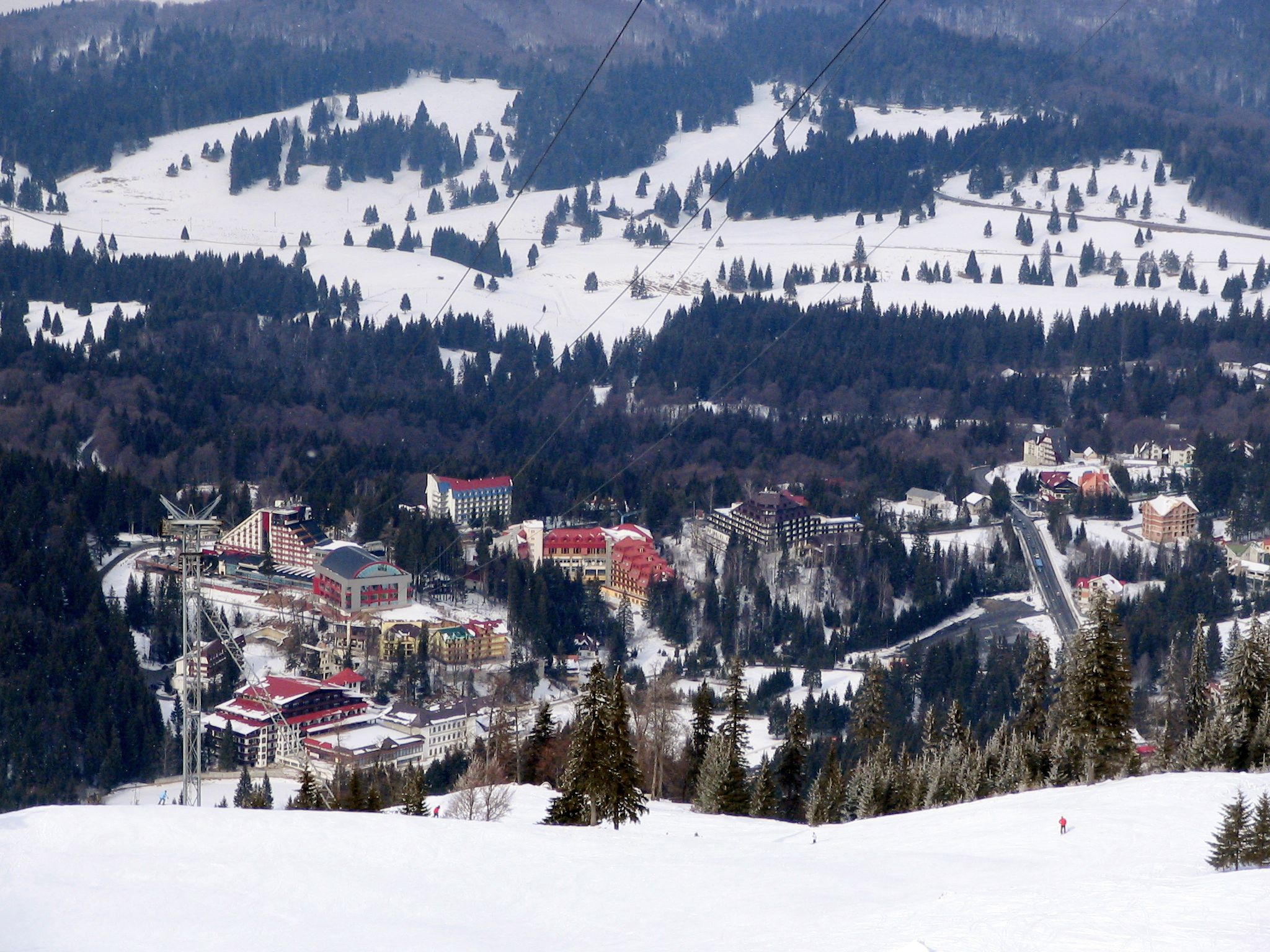

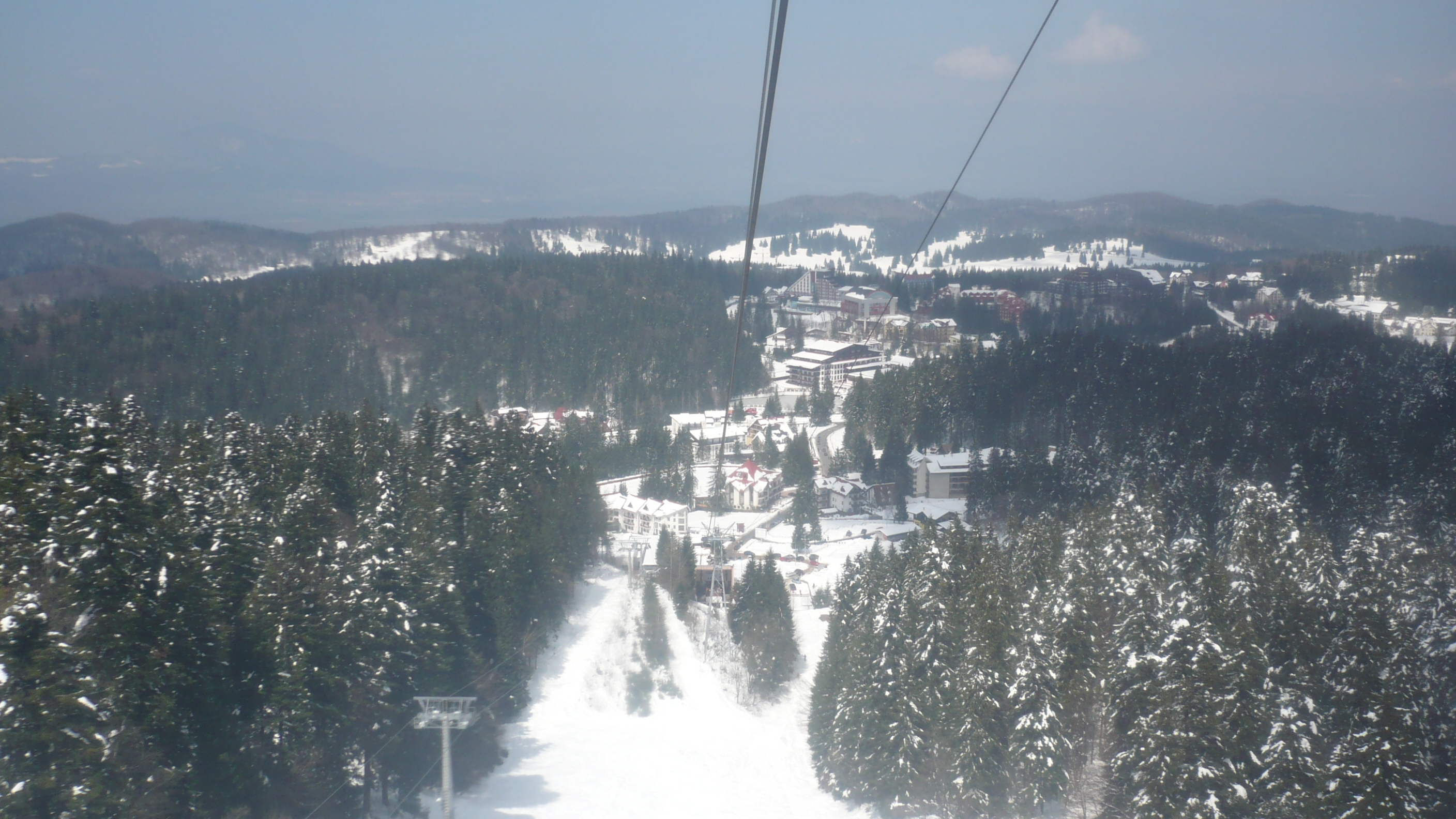

== See also ==
- Brașov
- Tourism in Romania
- List of ski areas and resorts in Europe
