= Ana Cartianu =

Romanian academic, essayist and translator

Ana Cartianu (19 April 1908 – 24 April 2001) was a Romanian academic, essayist and translator.

== Biography ==
She was born in the village of Urșani (lungsod) in Horezu commune, Vâlcea County. She studied at Bedford College, London (1928–32), and received her degree from the Literature Department, School of English Studies of Cernăuți University in 1934.

In 1936, she co-founded the School of English Language and Literature at the University of Bucharest, where she would later be Dean of the School of Germanic Languages (1948-1970).

Ana Cartianu is known as the "great dame of English studies in Romania".

In 1930, she married Gheorghe Cartianu-Popescu, a university professor. Her maiden name was Tomescu. She died in Bucharest in 2001.

== Awards ==
- Romanian Writers' Union Award for translations from Romanian (1973)

== Books (selection) ==
- An Advanced Course in Modern Rumanian (co-author, with Leon Levițchi, Virgiliu Ștefănescu-Drăgănești), București, Ed. Științifică, (1958) (1964)
- Proză eseistică victoriană. Antologie, ("An Anthology of Victorian Essays"), (co-editor, with Ștefan Stoenescu), București, (1969)
- Dicționar al literaturii engleze ("A Dictionary of English Literature"), (co-author, with Ioan Aurel Preda), București (1970)

== Translations ==
- Short Stories by Ioan Slavici, 1955
- Romanian Folk Tales, 1979
- Nicolae Ciobanu, Romanian Fantastic Tales, 1981
- Mihai Zamfir, History and Legend in Romanian Short Stories and Tales, 1983
- Vasile Voiculescu, Tales of Fantasy and Magic, 1986
- Selected Works of Ion Creangă and Mihai Eminescu, 1992
- Mircea Eliade, Mystic Stories: The Sacred and the Profane, 1992
- The Tales and Stories of Ispirescu, Murrays Children's Books, London

== Bibliography ==
- Ana Cartianu: Festschrift (Editura Universității din București, 2000)
- Aurel Sasu, Dicționarul biografic al literaturii române, Vol. A-L, Ed. Paralela 45, Pitești, 2006, p. 280
