= Râul Cheii =

Râul Cheii may refer to the following rivers in Romania:

- Râul Cheii, a tributary of the Tarcău in Neamț County
- Râul Cheii, a tributary of the Vâlsan in Argeș County

== See also ==
- Cheia River (disambiguation)
- Valea Cheii River (disambiguation)
