= Canalul Timiș =

Canal in Romania

Canalul Timiș Timiș Canal
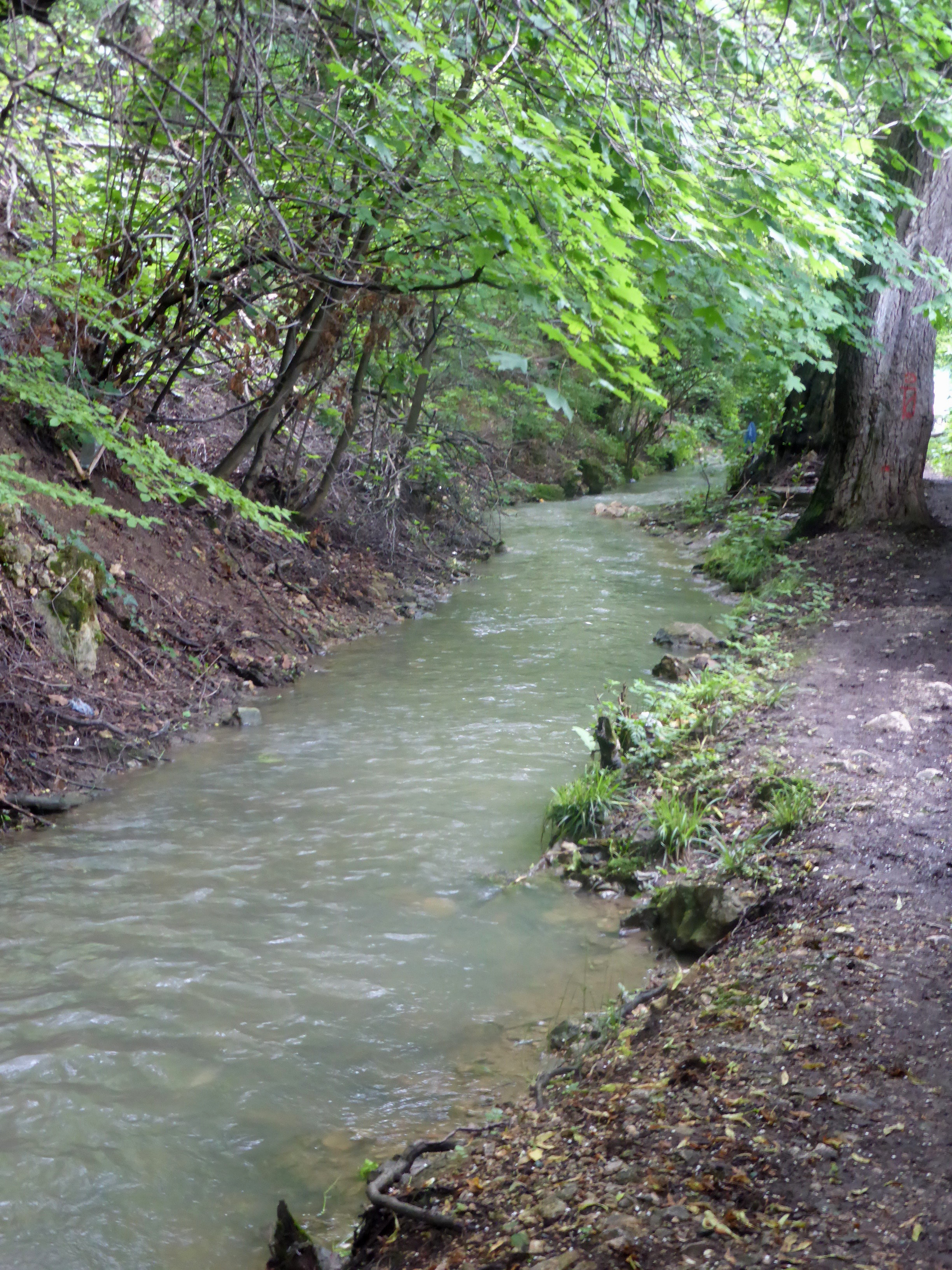

Specifications
- Length: 14 km (8.7 mi)
- Maximum height above sea level: 646 m (2,119 ft)
- Minimum height above sea level: 525 m (1,722 ft)

Geography
- Start point: Timiș near Dâmbul Morii, Romania
- End point: Ghimbășel north of Brașov, Romania
- Beginning coordinates: 45.5984°N 25.6469°E
- Ending coordinates: 45°41′26″N 25°33′56″E

The Canalul Timiș (Timiș Canal) is a canal linking the rivers Timiș and Ghimbășel in Brașov County, central Romania. It is 14 km (8.7 mi) long, and was first documented in the year 1500. The canal starts at Dâmbul Morii near Timișu de Jos, running parallel to the river Timiș until Dârste, where it turns to the northwest. It passes north of the historic centre of Brașov, and discharges into the Ghimbășel in Stupini, a northern neighbourhood of Brașov. The canal intercepts the small rivers flowing towards the city from the Postăvarul Massif (Pârâul Ciurii, Șipot, Aluniș, Valea Cetății, Șcheiu) and diverts them into the Ghimbășel, on many reaches using the river beds of previous rivers. In the city the canal is covered.
