= Timiș (Olt) =

Timiș Timișul Sec
- Location within Romania

Location
- Country: Romania
- Counties: Brașov County
- Villages: Timișu de Sus, Timișu de Jos, Dâmbul Morii, Dârste

Physical characteristics
- Source: Piatra Mare Mountains
  - location: near Predeal
- Mouth: Ghimbășel
  - location: Sânpetru
  - coordinates: 45°43′23″N 25°36′01″E
  - elevation: 509 m (1,670 ft)
- Length: 35 km (22 mi)
- Basin size: 105 km^{2} (41 sq mi)

Basin features
- Progression: Ghimbășel→ Bârsa→ Olt→ Danube→ Black Sea

The Timiș or Timișul Sec is a right tributary of the river Ghimbășel in Romania. Its source is in the Piatra Mare Mountains, northeast of Predeal. It discharges into the Ghimbășel in Sânpetru. It flows through the eastern part of the city Brașov. Its length is 35 km (22 mi) and its basin size is 105 km^{2} (41 sq mi). Part of its water is diverted towards the Timiș Canal.

== Tributaries ==
The following rivers are tributaries to the river Timiș:

- Left: Vlădeț, Valea Calului, Valea Postăvaru, Valea Dragă, Lamba Mare, Vama Mare, Varna Mare, Larga Mare
- Right: Timișul Sec de Jos (including Valea Pietrei Mici), Valea Carierei, Valea Pietrei Mari, Valea Dracului, Șipoaia
