= Gheorghe Cartianu-Popescu =

Romanian engineer

Gheorghe Cartianu-Popescu (8 August 1907 – 26 June 1982) was a Romanian engineer.

He was born in Borca, Neamț County. After attending elementary school in his native commune and in Dobrovăț, Iași County, he went to high school in Bacău, graduating in 1926. Cartianu-Popescu then went to Politehnica University of Bucharest to study engineering, while also attending courses at the Faculty of Mathematics of the University of Bucharest. He received his engineering degree from Politehnica University in 1932, and in 1968 he obtained a Ph.D. degree in engineering from the same university.

Cartianu-Popescu designed the Bod Transmitter, which was built in 1933–1934. He was elected a corresponding member of the Romanian Academy in 1963.

In 1930, he married Ana Cartianu, née Tomescu. He died in Bucharest in 1982.
