= Bârsa lui Bucur =

- Location within Romania

Location
- Country: Romania
- Counties: Brașov County

Physical characteristics
- Source: Făgăraș Mountains
- Mouth: Bârsa
  - coordinates: 45.5721°N 25.2187°E
- Length: 12 km (7.5 mi)
- Basin size: 34 km^{2} (13 sq mi)

Basin features
- Progression: Bârsa→ Olt→ Danube→ Black Sea
- Tributaries
  - left: Ciuma
- River code: VIII.1.50.1

The Bârsa lui Bucur is a left tributary of the river Bârsa in Romania. Its source is in the eastern part of the Făgăraș Mountains. It flows into the Bârsa upstream from Zărnești. Its length is 12 km (7.5 mi) and its basin size is 34 km^{2} (13 sq mi).
