= Bârsa Fierului =

- Location within Romania

Location
- Country: Romania
- Counties: Brașov County

Physical characteristics
- Source: Făgăraș Mountains
- Mouth: Bârsa
  - coordinates: 45.5800°N 25.2701°E
- Length: 15 km (9.3 mi)
- Basin size: 50 km^{2} (19 sq mi)

Basin features
- Progression: Bârsa→ Olt→ Danube→ Black Sea
- Tributaries
  - right: Valea Strâmbelor, Plaiu
- River code: VIII.1.50.2

The Bârsa Fierului is a left tributary of the river Bârsa in Romania. It source is in the eastern part of the Făgăraș Mountains. Its length is 15 km (9.3 mi) and its basin size is 50 km^{2} (19 sq mi).
