= Ponor, Alba =

Ponor
- Commune
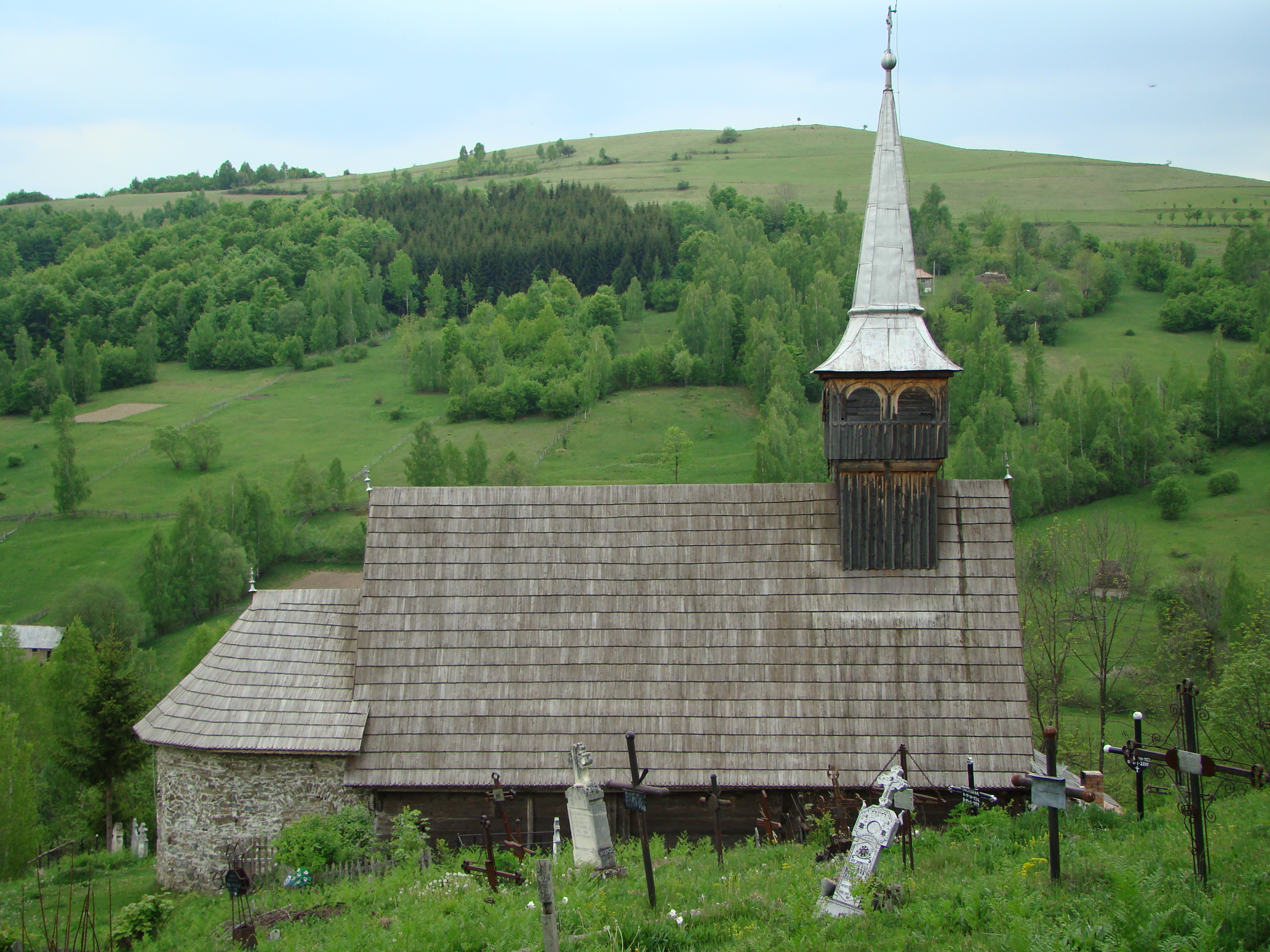
- Wooden Orthodox church in Geogel village (1751)

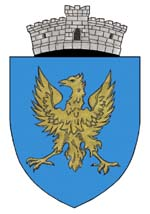
- Coat of arms

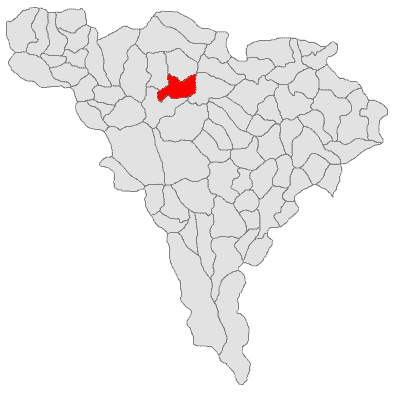
- Location in Alba County

- Location in Romania
- Coordinates: 46°20′27″N 23°24′7″E
- Country: Romania
- County: Alba

Government
  - Mayor (2020–2024): Bujor Petruț (PNL)
- Area: 62.16 km^{2} (24.00 sq mi)
- Elevation: 869 m (2,851 ft)
- Population (2021-12-01): 475
  - Density: 7.64/km^{2} (19.8/sq mi)
- Time zone: UTC+02:00 (EET)
  - Summer (DST): UTC+03:00 (EEST)
- Postal code: 517565
- Area code: (+40) 02 58
- Vehicle reg.: AB
- Website: comunaponor.ro

Ponor (German: Gross-Poner; Hungarian: Nagyponor) is a commune located in Alba County, Transylvania, Romania. It is composed of six villages: După Deal, Geogel (Kisgyógypatak), Măcărești, Ponor, Vale în Jos, and Valea Bucurului.

The commune lies on the banks of the river Cheia. It is situated in the southeastern reaches of the Apuseni Mountains, within the Trascău Mountains. Ponor is located in the central-north part of Alba County, 24 km (15 mi) southeast of Baia de Arieș, 38 km (24 mi) west of Aiud, and 55 km (34 mi) northwest of the county seat, Alba Iulia.

At the 2011 census, Ponor had a population of 540; of those, 96.3% were ethnic Romanians. At the 2021 census, the population had decreased to 475, of which 91.16% were ethnic Romanians.

== Natives ==
- Victor Ciorbea (born 1954), politician, Mayor of Bucharest and Prime Minister of Romania
