= Steve Timmis =

Australian businessman (born 1960)

Steve Timmis (born 8 June 1960) is an International Trade director for Aus Asia Industries (Australia). Timmis is also a board member of Murray Regional Tourism Board and a director of Big Screens Australia.
