= Râul Mare (Bârsa) =

Râul Mare Valea Prăpăstiilor
- Location within Romania

Location
- Country: Romania
- Counties: Brașov County
- Villages: Zărnești

Physical characteristics
- Source: Piatra Craiului Mountains
- Mouth: Bârsa
  - location: Zărnești
  - coordinates: 45.5626°N 25.3177°E
- Length: 11 km (6.8 mi)
- Basin size: 22 km^{2} (8.5 sq mi)

Basin features
- Progression: Bârsa→ Olt→ Danube→ Black Sea
- Tributaries
  - left: Valea Cheii, Dănișor

The Râul Mare (also: Valea Prăpăstiilor) is a right tributary of the river Bârsa in Romania. It flows into the Bârsa in Zărnești. Its length is 11 km (6.8 mi) and its basin size is 22 km^{2} (8.5 sq mi).
