= Sohodol (Bârsa) =

Tributary of the Bârsa River in Romania

- Location within Romania

Location
- Country: Romania
- Counties: Brașov County
- Villages: Sohodol

Physical characteristics
- Mouth: Bârsa
  - location: near Râșnov
  - coordinates: 45.6034°N 25.4328°E
- Length: 16 km (9.9 mi)
- Basin size: 41 km^{2} (16 sq mi)

Basin features
- Progression: Bârsa→ Olt→ Danube→ Black Sea
- Tributaries
  - right: Pănicel

The Sohodol is a right tributary of the river Bârsa in Romania. It flows into the Bârsa west of Râșnov. Its length is 16 km (9.9 mi) and its basin size is 41 km^{2} (16 sq mi).

== Etymology ==
"Sohodol" is a common noun of Slavic origin literally meaning "dry valley", with the connotation of being located in a karstic limestone area. It is a compound of soh ("dry, arid") and dol ("creek, ditch, valley").
