= Cheia (Arieș) =

- Location within Romania

Location
- Country: Romania
- Counties: Alba County
- Villages: Ponor, Vale în Jos, Sub Piatră

Physical characteristics
- Source: Trascău Mountains
- Mouth: Arieș
  - location: Sălciua de Jos
  - coordinates: 46.406°N 23.446°E
- Length: 18 km (11 mi)
- Basin size: 53 km^{2} (20 sq mi)

Basin features
- Progression: Arieș→ Mureș→ Tisza→ Danube→ Black Sea
- Tributaries
  - right: Poieni

The Cheia is a small river in the Apuseni Mountains, Alba County, western Romania. It is a right tributary of the river Arieș. It flows through the villages of Ponor and Vale în Jos, and joins the Arieș near the village Sub Piatră. Its length is 18 km (11 mi) and its basin size is 53 km^{2} (20 sq mi).
