= Valea Cheii (Dâmbovița) =

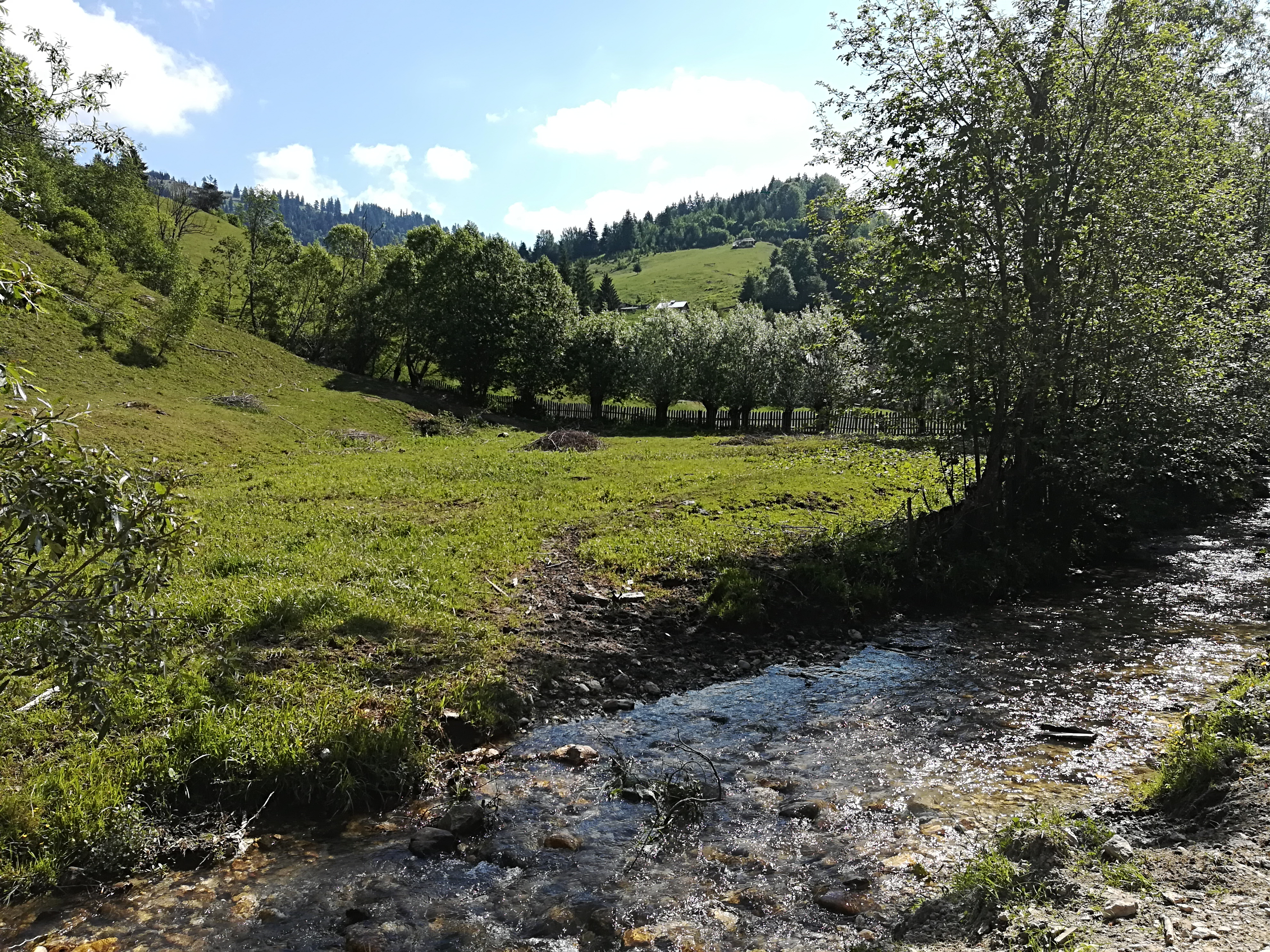

- Location within Romania

Location
- Country: Romania
- Counties: Argeș County

Physical characteristics
- Source: Leaota Mountains
- Mouth: Dâmbovița
  - location: near Podu Dâmboviței
  - coordinates: 45.3962°N 25.2014°E
- Length: 14 km (8.7 mi)
- Basin size: 35 km^{2} (14 sq mi)

Basin features
- Progression: Dâmbovița→ Argeș→ Danube→ Black Sea

The Valea Cheii (also: Cheia, in its upper course also: Rudărița) is a left tributary of the river Dâmbovița in Romania. Its source is in the Leaota Mountains. It flows into the Dâmbovița downstream from Podu Dâmboviței. Its length is 14 km (8.7 mi) and its basin size is 35 km^{2} (14 sq mi).

== Tributaries ==
The following rivers are tributaries to the river Valea Cheii (from source to mouth):

- Left: Prepeleac, Valea Crovului, Valea Pereților, Valea Bunii, Valea Strâmbă
- Right: Urdărița, Valea Furneciului
