= Postăvarul Massif =

Coordinates: 45.5°N 25.5°E

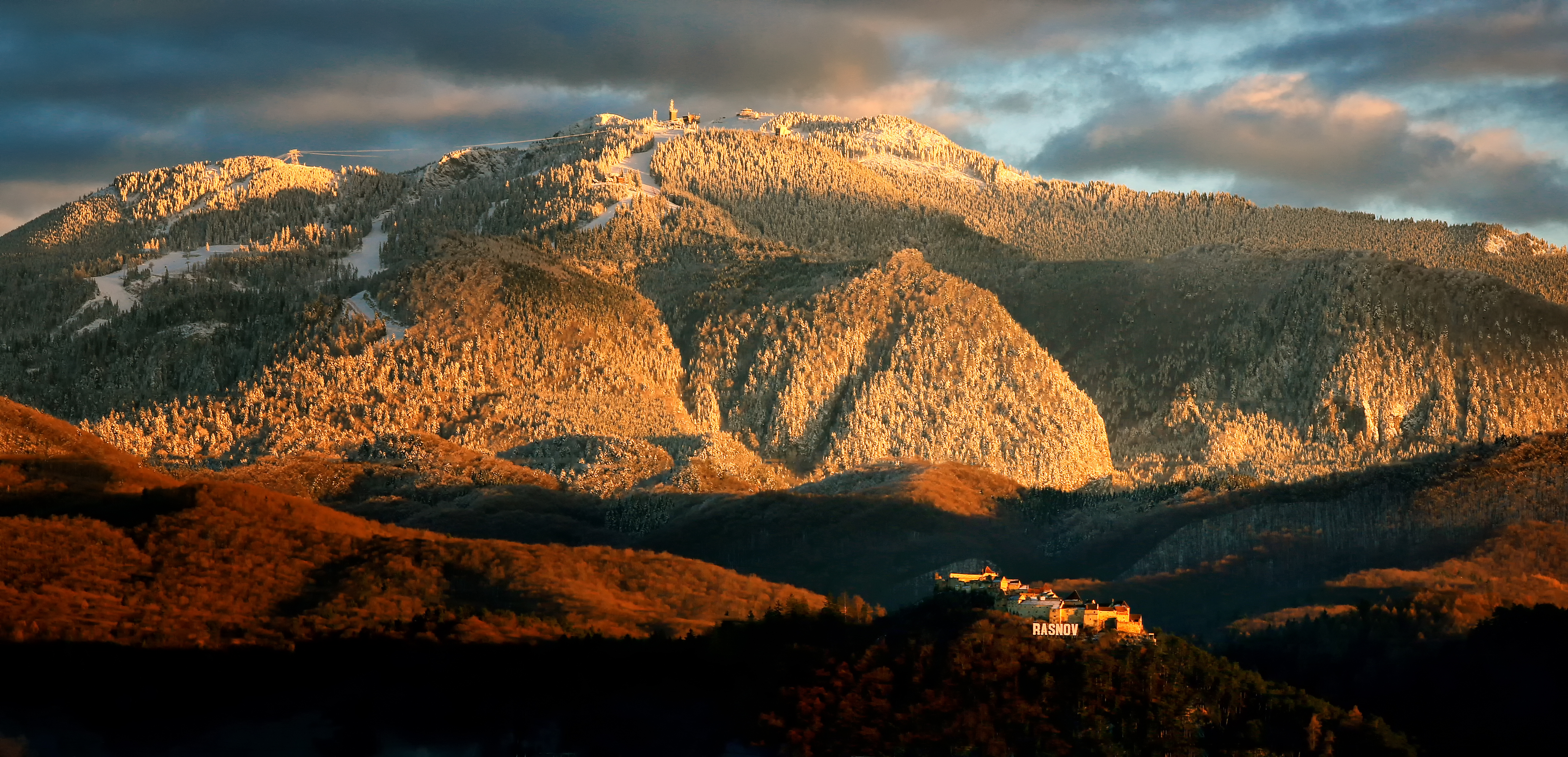
Postăvarul Massif with Râșnov Citadel and Poiana Brașov in the background

The Postăvarul massif (Transylvanian German Schuler and Schulerberg, or Hungarian Keresztényhavas) is a massif in Romania; it is part of the Romanian Carpathians, which in turn are part of the Carpathian Mountains range. The altitude of the highest peak, also named Postăvarul is 1799 metres.

Geographically the Postăvarul Massif stands at the southern end of the grand arc of the Eastern Carpathians. Together with the neighboring Piatra Mare Massif it forms the Bârsei Mountains group, neighbouring the southern side of Țara Bârsei (Burzenland) depression.

Poiana Brașov, one of the best-known ski resorts in Romania, is located on the northern slopes of Postăvarul mountain. The peak of the mountain can be easily reached from the resort by cable car.
