= Ghimbășel =

Ghimbășel Ghimbav
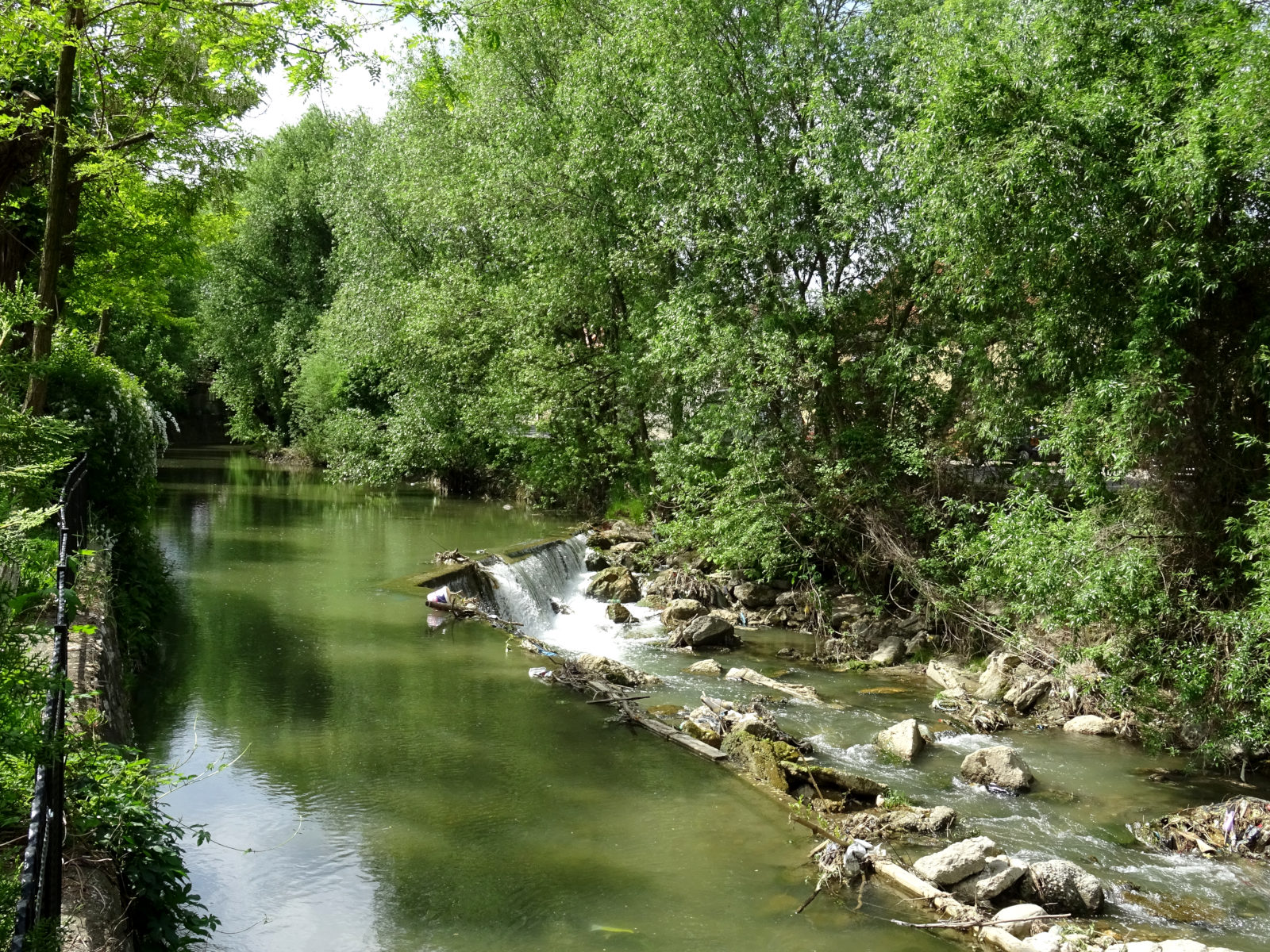

- Location within Romania

Location
- Country: Romania
- Counties: Brașov County
- Villages: Râșnov, Cristian, Ghimbav

Physical characteristics
- Source: Bucegi Mountains
- Mouth: Bârsa
  - location: Colonia Bod
  - coordinates: 45.7864°N 25.6238°E
- Length: 67 km (42 mi)
- Basin size: 533 km^{2} (206 sq mi)

Basin features
- River system: Bârsa→ Olt→ Danube→ Black Sea

The Ghimbășel (also Ghimbav) is a left tributary of the river Bârsa in Romania. Its source is in the northern part of the Bucegi Mountains. Originally it discharged directly into the Olt, but much of its flow has been diverted into the Bârsa, another tributary of the Olt, near Colonia Bod. Its length is 67 km (42 mi) and its basin size is 533 km^{2} (206 sq mi). The former lower course of the Ghimbășel, downstream of this diversion, still exists and is used for the discharge of local inflows. It flows into the Olt north of Bod. Its length is 6 km (3.7 mi) and its basin size is 8 km^{2} (3.1 sq mi).

== Tributaries ==
The following rivers are tributaries to the river Ghimbășel:

- Left: Valea Glăjăriei
- Right: Năjila, Pârâul Mic, Valea Cetății, Valea Joaderului, Canalul Timiș, Timiș, Durbav
