= Bârsa (Olt) =

Bârsa Bârsa Mare
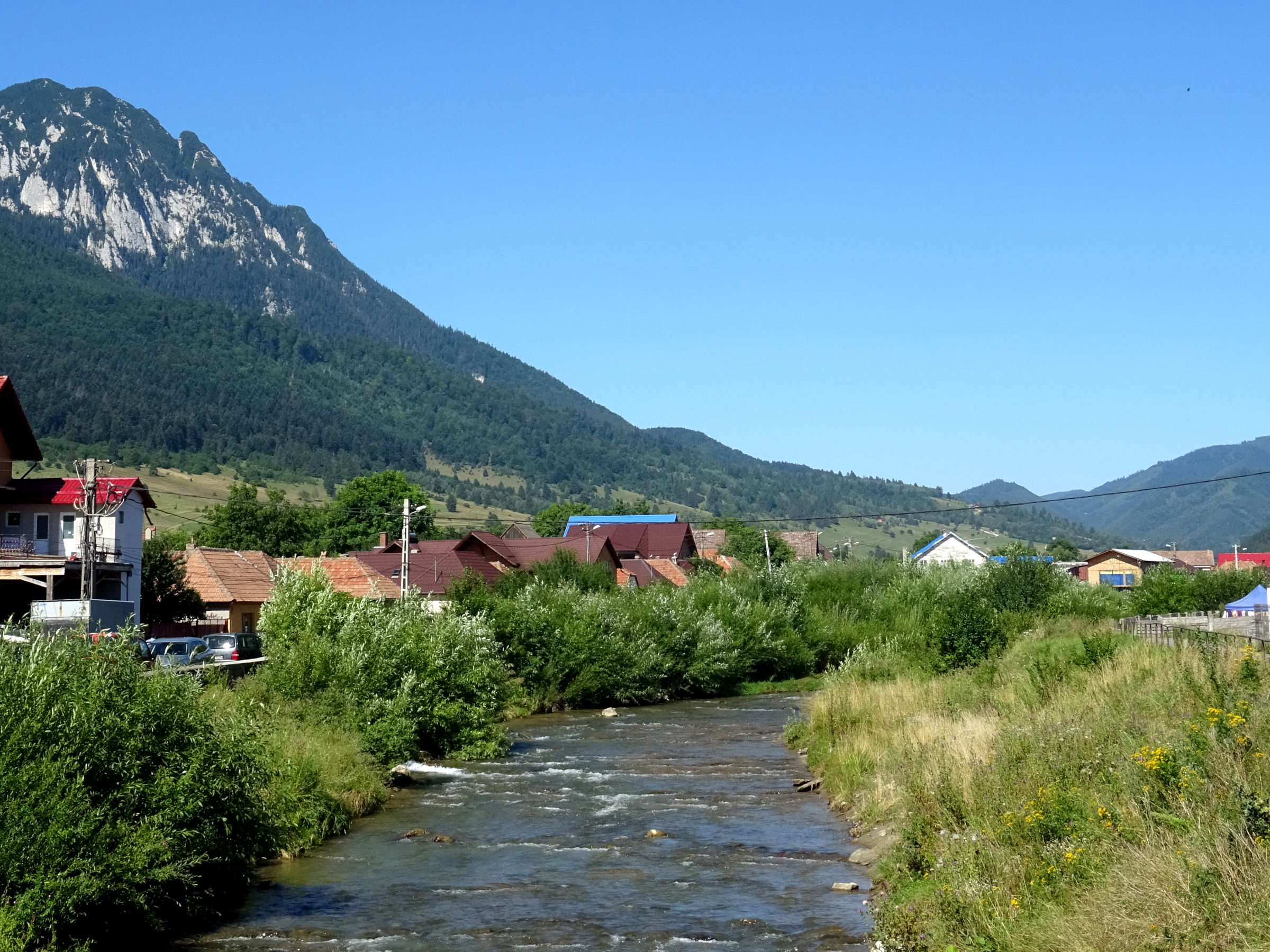
- Bârsa river at Zărnești

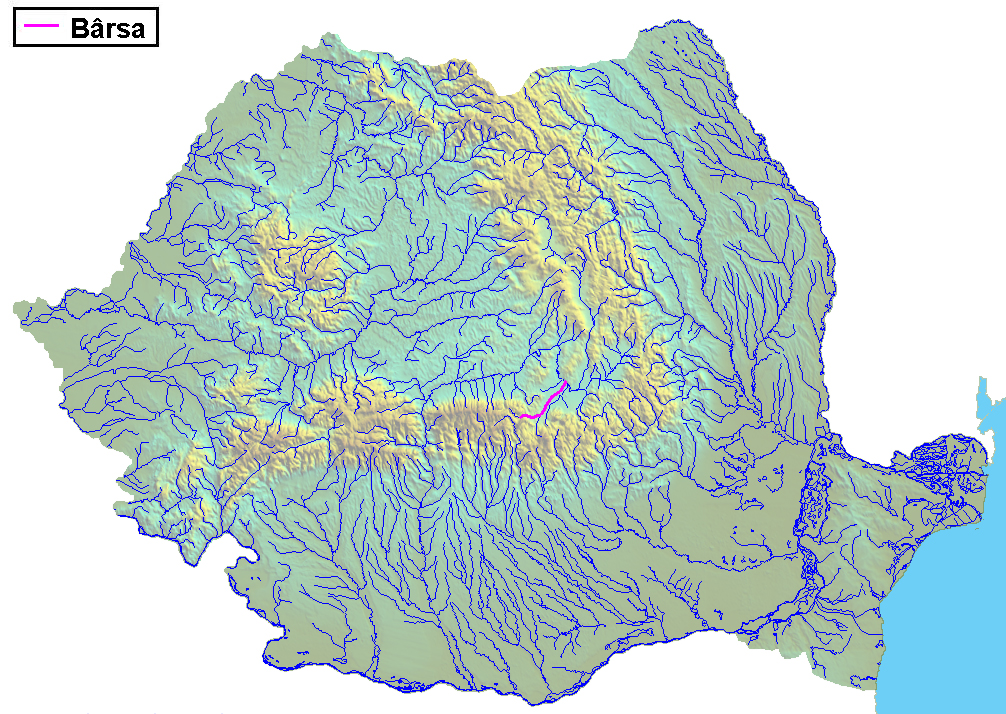

Location
- Country: Romania
- Counties: Brașov County
- Villages: Zărnești

Physical characteristics
- Source: Făgăraș Mountains
- Mouth: Olt
  - location: Near Feldioara
  - coordinates: 45.8079°N 25.6248°E
  - elevation: 386 m (1,266 ft)
- Length: 73 km (45 mi)
- Basin size: 937 km^{2} (362 sq mi)
- Discharge
  - location: *
  - average: 2.8 m^{3}/s (99 cu ft/s)

Basin features
- Progression: Olt→ Danube→ Black Sea
- Tributaries
  - right: Turcu, Ghimbășel

The Bârsa (in its upper course also: Bârsa Groșetului, German: Burzen) is a left tributary of the river Olt in Romania. It discharges into the Olt near Feldioara. Its source is in the Făgăraș Mountains. As several tributaries also have the name Bârsa, in order to differentiate them, the main course of the river is frequently referred to as Bârsa Mare. The river Ghimbășel, formerly a direct tributary of the Olt, was redirected towards the Bârsa. Its length is 73 km (45 mi) and its basin size is 937 km^{2} (362 sq mi).

== Tributaries ==
The following rivers are tributaries to the river Bârsa (from source to mouth):

- Left: Bârsa lui Bucur, Bârsa Fierului, Brebina Mare
- Right: Valea Mărului, Izvorul Lerescu, Bârsa Tămașului, Valea Podurilor, Padina lui Călineț, Padina Urșilor, Padina Bădoaiei, Padina Șindileriei, Padina Calului, Padina Hotarului, Valea Crăpăturii, Toplița, Râul Mare (Valea Prăpăstiilor), Turcu, Sohodol, Ghimbășel
