= Brașov bid for the 2020 Winter Youth Olympics =

Bids for the 2020 Winter Youth Olympics
Overview
- III Winter Youth Olympic Games
- Winner: Lausanne; Runner-up: Brașov

Details
- City: Brașov, Romania
- NOC: Romanian Olympic and Sports Committee

Previous Games hosted
- none

Decision
- Result: Runner-up

Brașov 2020 was a bid by the city of Brașov and the Romanian Olympic and Sports Committee to host the 2020 Winter Youth Olympics. The International Olympic Committee selected Lausanne as the host city on 31 July 2015.

== History ==
=== Applicant City Phase ===
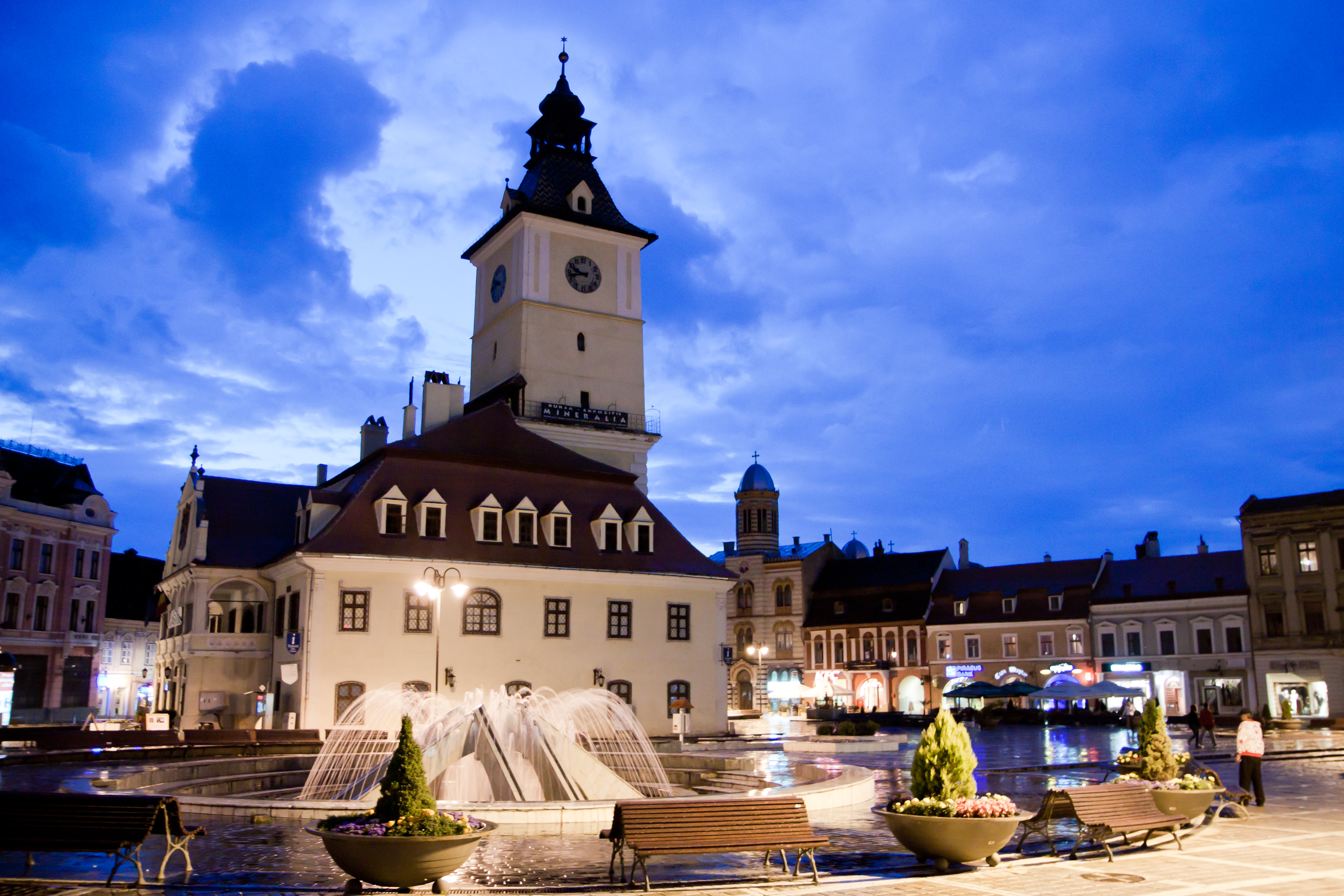
Brașov City Centre

Brașov's bid for the 2020 Winter Youth Olympics was confirmed on 28 November 2013. Brașov signed their Youth Olympic Game Candidature Procedure on 12 December 2013.

This is the first time that Romanian city bidded for the Youth Olympic Games.

In early 2013, Brașov hosted the 2013 European Youth Olympic Winter Festival.

== Venues ==
The proposed plan consisted of venues that were already used in 2013 European Youth Olympic Winter Festival

Venue	Location	Sports
Brașov Arena	Brașov	Opening and closing ceremonies
Brașov Olympic Ice Rink	Brașov	Ice hockey
Curling Venue Brașov	Brașov	Curling
Sub Teleferic	Poiana Brașov	Alpine skiing, Snowboarding (half-pipe)
Poiana Brașov Ice Rink	Poiana Brașov	Figure skating, Speed skating, Short track speed skating
Valea Râşnoavei Sport Center	Predeal	Cross country skiing
Sinaia Bobsleigh/Luge/Skeleton Track	Sinaia	Bobsleigh/luge/skeleton
Valea Carbunarii	Râșnov	Nordic-combined
Valea Cărbunării Ski Jumping Hill	Râșnov	Ski jumping
Cheile Grădiştei Arena	Fundata	Biathlon
Clăbucet Sosire Slope	Predeal	Snowboarding, Freestyle skiing
