= Sebastian Aho =

Finnish ice hockey player (born 1997)

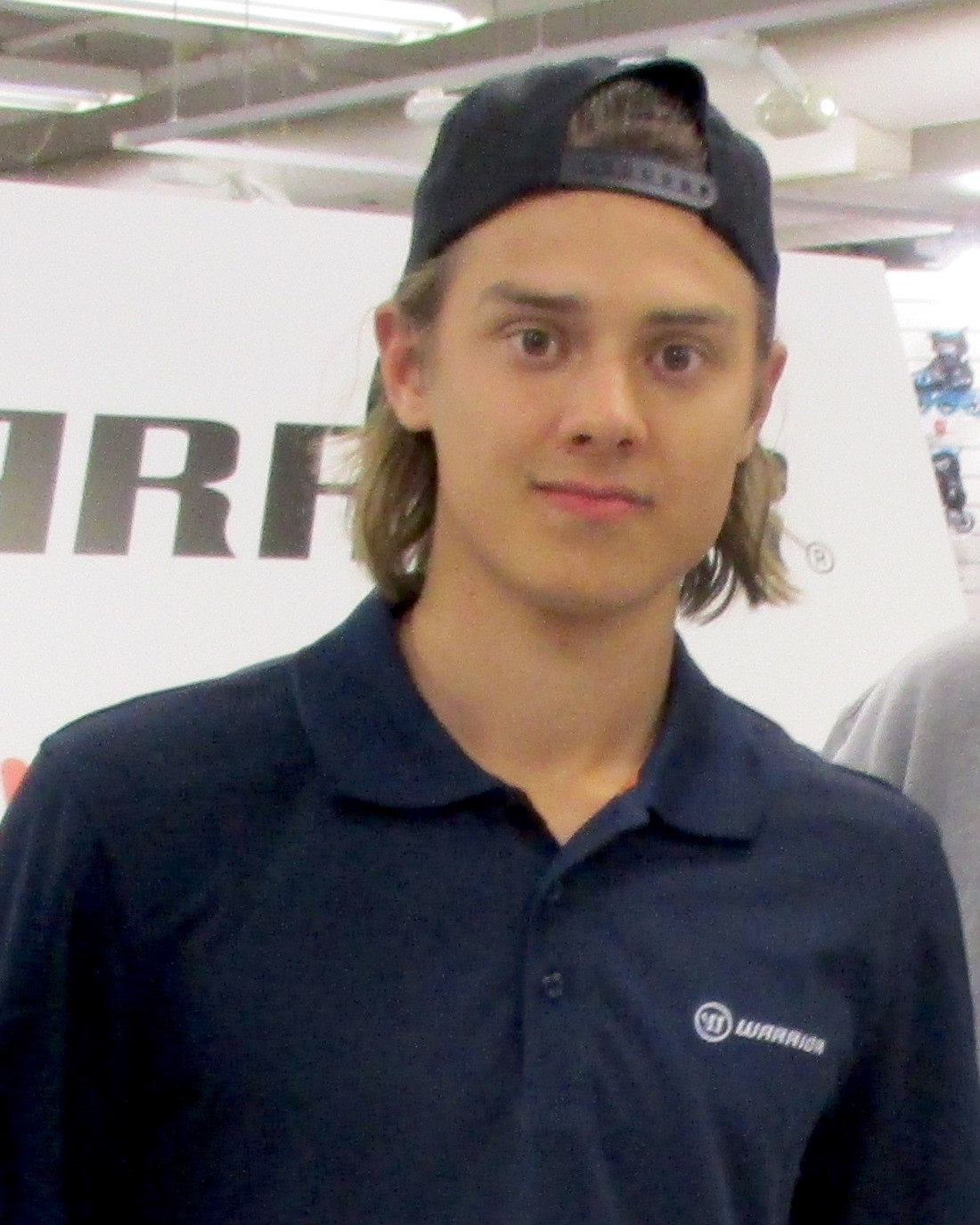
- Aho in 2016
- Born: 26 July 1997 (age 29) Rauma, Finland
- Height: 6 ft 0 in (183 cm)
- Weight: 189 lb (86 kg; 13 st 7 lb)
- Position: Forward
- Shoots: Left
- NHL team Former teams: Carolina Hurricanes; Oulun Kärpät; Ässät
- National team: Finland
- NHL draft: 35th overall, 2015; Carolina Hurricanes
- Playing career: 2014–present

Sebastian Antero Aho (born 26 July 1997) is a Finnish professional ice hockey player who is a forward and alternate captain for the Carolina Hurricanes of the National Hockey League (NHL). Selected by Carolina in the second round, 35th overall, of the 2015 NHL entry draft, Aho made his NHL debut during the 2016–17 NHL season after playing in Finland's Liiga for Oulun Kärpät and Ässät. Internationally, Aho has won medals with Finland at the World Junior Championships, World Championships and Winter Olympics, including bronze at the 2026 Winter Olympics. He won the Stanley Cup with the Hurricanes in 2026.

== Playing career ==
=== Liiga ===
Aho made his Liiga debut playing with Oulun Kärpät during the 2013–14 season. In the playoffs of the 2014–15 season, Aho scored the game-winning goal in overtime of Game seven of the finals and won the Finnish championship for Kärpät.

=== Carolina Hurricanes ===
Aho was rated amongst the top 20 European forward skaters eligible for the 2015 NHL entry draft. In the draft, he was selected in the second round, 35th overall, by the Carolina Hurricanes.

On 13 June 2016, Aho signed a three-year, entry-level contract with Carolina. On 13 October 2016, he made his NHL debut—and recorded his first point, an assist—in the opening game of the 2016–17 season. On 12 November 2016, he scored his first goal, which was followed by a second goal in a 5–1 win over the Washington Capitals. On 31 January 2017, Aho scored his first career hat-trick in a game against the Philadelphia Flyers. Consequently, he became the youngest player in Hurricanes/Whalers franchise history to score a hat-trick.

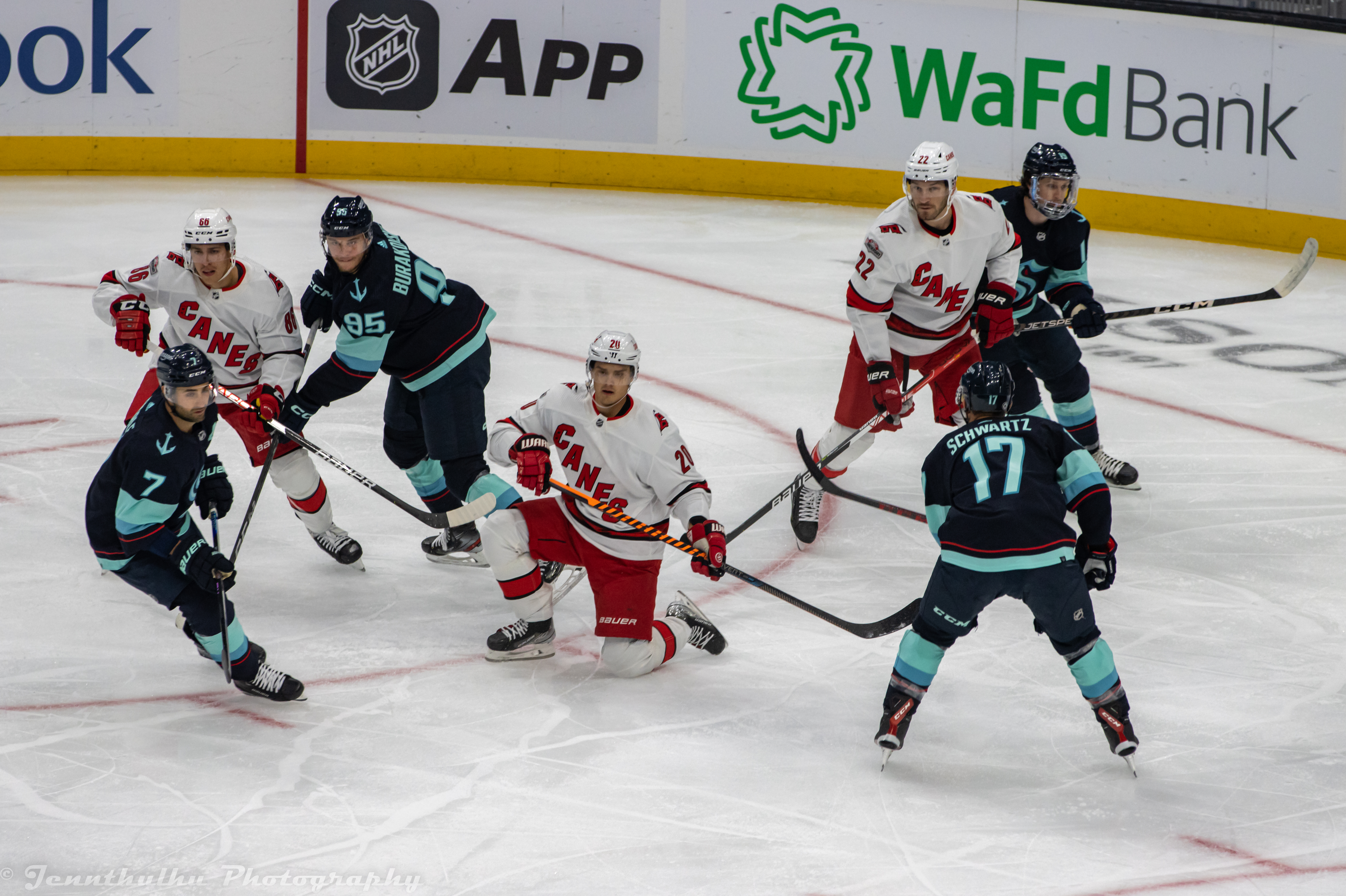
Aho (middle) in action against the Seattle Kraken in 2022.

After the Hurricanes failed to make the 2018 Stanley Cup playoffs, Aho represented Finland at the 2018 IIHF World Championship.

During the 2018–19 season, Aho passed Ron Francis' franchise record for longest season-opening point streak by recording a point in the Hurricanes' first 12 games. The streak also included a 12-game season-opening assist streak, tying Wayne Gretzky and Ken Linseman for the longest such streak in NHL history. His streak ended on 3 November in a 4–3 overtime loss to the Arizona Coyotes. On 2 January, Aho was selected to participate in the 2019 NHL All-Star Game after leading the team in goals, assists and points through 38 games. On 13 January 2019, Aho recorded his second career hat-trick in a 6–3 win over the Nashville Predators. Aho led the Hurricanes in scoring (five goals, seven assists) during their first trip to the playoffs in 10 years in the 2018–19 season.

On 1 July 2019, Aho signed an offer sheet with the Montreal Canadiens, becoming the first player to sign an offer sheet since Ryan O'Reilly in 2013. The five-year offer sheet was worth $42.27 million and included a bonus-heavy structure, with more than $21 million owed during the first calendar year. On 7 July, the Hurricanes matched the offer sheet, re-signing Aho to a five-year, $42.27 million contract.

On 26 July 2023, the Hurricanes re-signed Aho to an eight-year, $78 million contract extension. The deal began with the 2024–25 NHL season and pays Aho an average annual value of $9.75 million through the 2031–32 season.

During the 2023–24 season, Aho recorded an NHL career-high 89 points, with 36 goals and 53 assists, in 78 games. He led the Hurricanes in goals, assists and points, and was selected to the 2024 NHL All-Star Game.

During the 2024–25 season, Aho led Carolina in assists and points, recording 74 points, with 29 goals and 45 assists, in 79 games.

During the 2025–26 season, Aho led the Hurricanes with 80 points, recording 27 goals and 53 assists in 79 regular-season games. He added 12 points, with five goals and seven assists, in 19 playoff games as Carolina won the 2026 Stanley Cup Final over the Vegas Golden Knights.

== International play ==
Medal record

Men's ice hockey

Representing Finland

Winter Olympics
Bronze medal – third place	2026 Milano Cortina	

World Championships
Silver medal – second place	2016 Russia	

World Junior Championships
Gold medal – first place	2016 Finland	

IIHF World U18 Championship
Silver medal – second place	2015 Switzerland	

European Youth Olympic Winter Festival
Gold medal – first place	2013 Braşov	

Aho represented Finland at the 2026 Winter Olympics, where he was named one of Finland's alternate captains. Finland defeated Slovakia 6–1 in the bronze-medal game, and Aho finished the tournament with four goals.

== Personal life ==
Aho was born in the Satakunnan keskussairaala in Pori, but his legal birthplace is Rauma.

== Career statistics ==
=== Regular season and playoffs ===
			Regular season					Playoffs
Season	Team	League	GP	G	A	Pts	PIM	GP	G	A	Pts	PIM
2012–13	Kärpät	FIN U18	38	28	32	60	32	—	—	—	—	—
2012–13	Kärpät	FIN U20	5	2	2	4	0	5	0	1	1	2
2013–14	Kärpät	FIN U18	2	3	3	6	0	—	—	—	—	—
2013–14	Kärpät	FIN U20	44	25	34	59	18	12	4	8	12	10
2013–14	Kärpät	Liiga	3	0	1	1	0	—	—	—	—	—
2014–15	Kärpät	FIN U20	10	1	9	10	4	5	1	4	5	2
2014–15	Kärpät	Liiga	27	4	7	11	10	10	1	2	3	2
2014–15	Ässät	Liiga	3	0	2	2	0	—	—	—	—	—
2015–16	Kärpät	Liiga	45	20	25	45	2	14	4	11	15	8
2016–17	Carolina Hurricanes	NHL	82	24	25	49	26	—	—	—	—	—
2017–18	Carolina Hurricanes	NHL	78	29	36	65	24	—	—	—	—	—
2018–19	Carolina Hurricanes	NHL	82	30	53	83	26	15	5	7	12	2
2019–20	Carolina Hurricanes	NHL	68	38	28	66	26	8	3	9	12	4
2020–21	Carolina Hurricanes	NHL	56	24	33	57	32	11	6	5	11	12
2021–22	Carolina Hurricanes	NHL	79	37	44	81	38	14	4	7	11	12
2022–23	Carolina Hurricanes	NHL	75	36	31	67	42	15	5	7	12	12
2023–24	Carolina Hurricanes	NHL	78	36	53	89	36	11	4	8	12	2
2024–25	Carolina Hurricanes	NHL	79	29	45	74	46	15	7	8	15	8
2025–26	Carolina Hurricanes	NHL	79	27	53	80	46	19	5	7	12	10
Liiga totals			78	24	35	59	12	24	5	13	18	10
NHL totals			756	310	401	711	342	108	39	58	97	62

=== International ===
Year	Team	Event	Result	GP	G	A	Pts	PIM
2013	Finland	IH18	5th	4	0	0	0	2
2014	Finland	WJC18	6th	5	2	1	3	4
2014	Finland	IH18	5th	4	5	2	7	0
2015	Finland	WJC	7th	5	0	0	0	2
2015	Finland	WJC18	2nd place, silver medalist(s)	1	0	1	1	0
2016	Finland	WJC	1st place, gold medalist(s)	7	5	9	14	4
2016	Finland	WC	2nd place, silver medalist(s)	10	3	4	7	4
2016	Finland	WCH	8th	3	0	0	0	0
2017	Finland	WC	4th	10	2	9	11	4
2018	Finland	WC	5th	8	9	9	18	2
2025	Finland	4NF	4th	3	0	2	2	2
2026	Finland	OG	3rd place, bronze medalist(s)	6	4	2	6	2
Junior totals				26	12	13	25	12
Senior totals				40	18	26	44	14

== Awards and honours ==
Award	Year	Ref
NHL
NHL All-Star Game	2019, 2022, 2024	
Stanley Cup champion	2026	
International
World Championships best forward	2018	
