= Țiriac =

Țiriac (pronunciation: [t͡siriˈak]) may refer to:

- Ion Țiriac (born 1939), Romanian businessman, and former tennis and ice hockey player
- Ion Țiriac Sports Complex, an outdoor sporting venue in Brașov, Romania
- Țiriac Holdings, a Romanian company primarily owned by Ion Țiriac
- Țiriac Open, also known as BRD Năstase Țiriac Trophy
- Țiriac Air, a Romanian corporate charter airline
