= Barbora Blažková =

Czech ski jumper

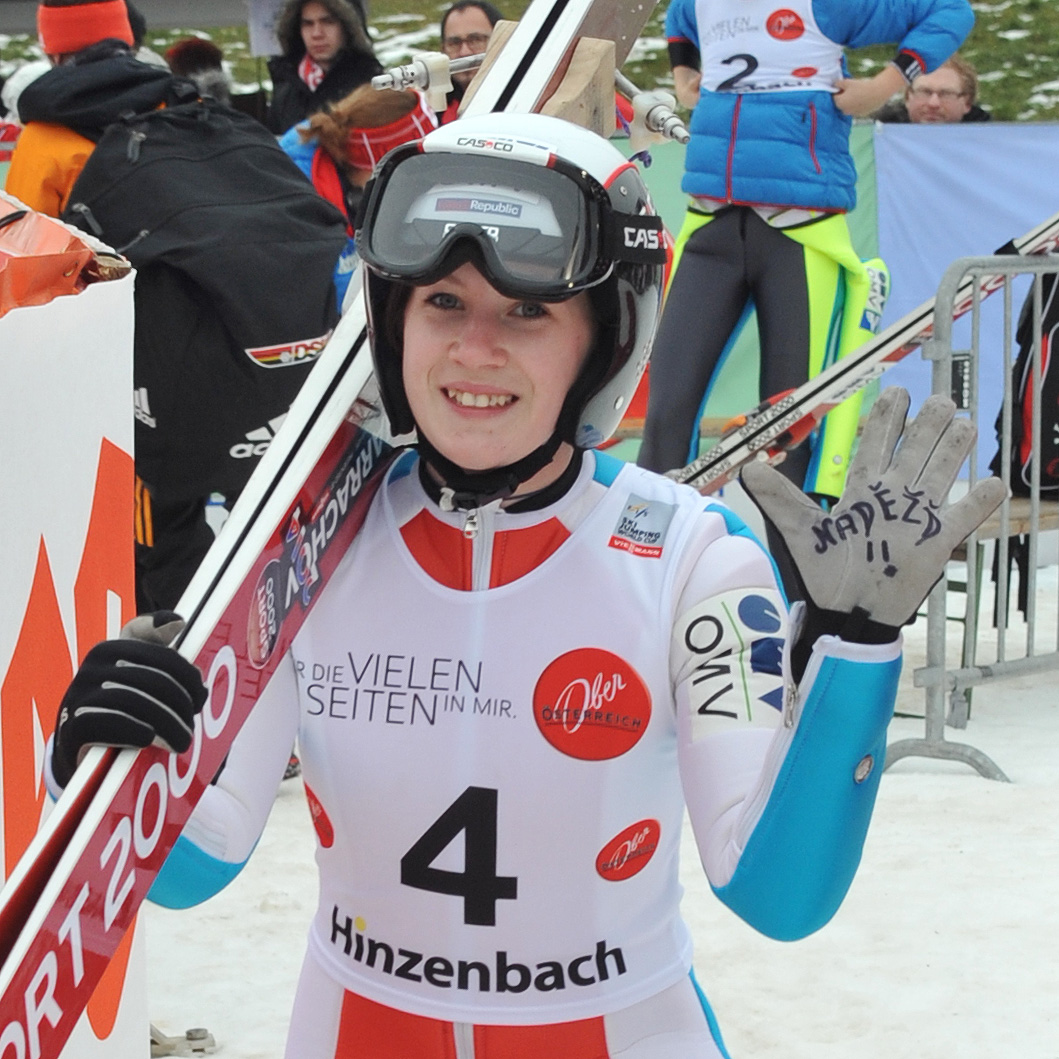
- Blažková in Hinzenbach, 2014

Personal information
- Nationality: Czech Republic
- Born: 23 September 1997 (age 28) Jablonec nad Nisou, Czech Republic

Sport
- Sport: Skiing
- Club: JKL Desná

World Cup career
- Seasons: 2013–2014; 2016–2017; 2019
- Indiv. starts: 22
Medal record
Girls' ski jumping
European Youth Olympic Festival
Gold medal – first place	2013 Râșnov	Mixed team MH
- Updated on 27 November 2020

Barbora Blažková (born 23 September 1997) is a Czech former ski jumper. She competed at World Cup level from the 2012–13 to 2018–19 seasons, with her best individual result being 23rd place in Oberstdorf on 8 January 2017. At the 2013 European Youth Olympic Winter Festival, she won a mixed team gold medal.

Blažková ended her career in June 2019.
