= Snowboarding at the 2013 European Youth Olympic Winter Festival =

- Venue: Clăbucet Sosire (Arrival) Slope, Predeal
- Date: 19–21 February

Snowboarding at the 2013 European Youth Olympic Winter Festival is held at the Clăbucet Sosire (Arrival) slope in Predeal, Romania from 19 to 22 February 2013.

== Results ==
=== Medal table ===
| Rank | Nation | Gold | Silver | Bronze | Total |
|---|---|---|---|---|---|
| 1 | Italy (ITA) | 1 | 1 | 0 | 2 |
| 2 | Switzerland (SUI) | 1 | 0 | 1 | 2 |
| 3 | France (FRA) | 1 | 0 | 0 | 1 |
| 3 | Russia (RUS) | 1 | 0 | 0 | 1 |
| 5 | Austria (AUT) | 0 | 1 | 1 | 2 |
| 6 | Germany (GER) | 0 | 1 | 0 | 1 |
| 6 | Poland (POL) | 0 | 1 | 0 | 1 |
| 8 | Netherlands (NED) | 0 | 0 | 1 | 1 |
| 8 | Slovenia (SLO) | 0 | 0 | 1 | 1 |
| Totals (9 entries) | | 4 | 4 | 4 | 12 |

=== Men's events ===
| Event | Gold | | Silver | | Bronze | |
|---|---|---|---|---|---|---|
| Snowboard Cross | Jerome Lymann (SUI) | 49.58 | Luca Haemmerle (AUT) | 50.67 | Sandro Perrenoud (SUI) | 51.27 |
| Parallel Giant Slalom | Vladislav Shkurikhin (RUS) | | Oskar Kwiatkowski (POL) | | Jure Retuznik (SLO) | |

=== Women's events ===
| Event | Gold | | Silver | | Bronze | |
|---|---|---|---|---|---|---|
| Snowboard Cross | Juliette Lefevre (FRA) | 54.73 | Francesca Gallina (ITA) | 56.43 | Katharina Neussner (AUT) | 56.68 |
| Parallel Giant Slalom | Elisa Profanter (ITA) | | Carolin Langenhorst (GER) | | Michelle Dekker (NED) | |
