= Short-track speed skating at the 2013 European Youth Olympic Winter Festival =

Short track speed skating at the 2013 European Youth Olympic Winter Festival
- Venue: Sub Teleferic, Poiana Brașov Ice Rink
- Date: 17–19 February

Short track speed skating at the 2013 European Youth Olympic Winter Festival is held at the Poiana Brașov Ice Rink in the National Sports Complex Poiana Brașov at Poiana Brașov, Romania from 17 to 19 February 2013.

== Results ==
=== Medal table ===
Rank	Nation	Gold	Silver	Bronze	Total
1	Russia (RUS)	4	3	1	8
2	France (FRA)	2	1	2	5
3	Romania (ROU)	1	1	0	2
4	Italy (ITA)	0	1	2	3
5	Great Britain (GBR)	0	1	0	1
6	Poland (POL)	0	0	2	2
Totals (6 entries)		7	7	7	21

=== Men's events ===
Event	Gold		Silver		Bronze	
1500m	Tristan Navarro (FRA)	2:20,691	Daniil Zasosov (RUS)	2:21,738	Yoann Martinez (FRA)	2:22,518
1000m	Emil Imre (ROU)	1:33,745	Tristan Navarro (FRA)	1:33,748	Denis Ayrapetyan (RUS)	1:39,915
500m	Denis Ayrapetyan (RUS)	0:43,803	Emil Imre (ROU)	0:44,133	Palla Leonardo (ITA)	0:44,333

=== Ladies events ===
Event	Gold		Silver		Bronze	
1500m	Sofia Prosvirnova (RUS)	2:28,319	Anna Kalinina (RUS)	2:28,444	Oliwia Gawlica (POL)	2:30,450
1000m	Sofia Prosvirnova (RUS)	1:39,453	Anna Kalinina (RUS)	1:39,455	Aurélie Monvoisin (FRA)	1:39,593
500m	Sofia Prosvirnova (RUS)	0:45,964	Kathryn Thomson (GBR)	0:46,087	Nicole Botter-Gomez (ITA)	0:46,569

=== Mixed events ===
Event	Gold		Silver		Bronze	
Relay	France (FRA); Margaux Maurice; Aurélie Monvoisin; Yoann Martinez; Tristan Navarro	4:25,973	Italy (ITA); Nicole Botter-Gomez; Gloria Malfatti; Damiano Giuliani; Leonardo Palla	4:26,566	Poland (POL); Oliwia Gawlica; Magdalena Warakomska; Grzegorz Gawryluk; Krystian Korecki	4:26,699
