= Communal Abattoir, Timișoara =

Communal Abattoir
- Abatorul Comunal
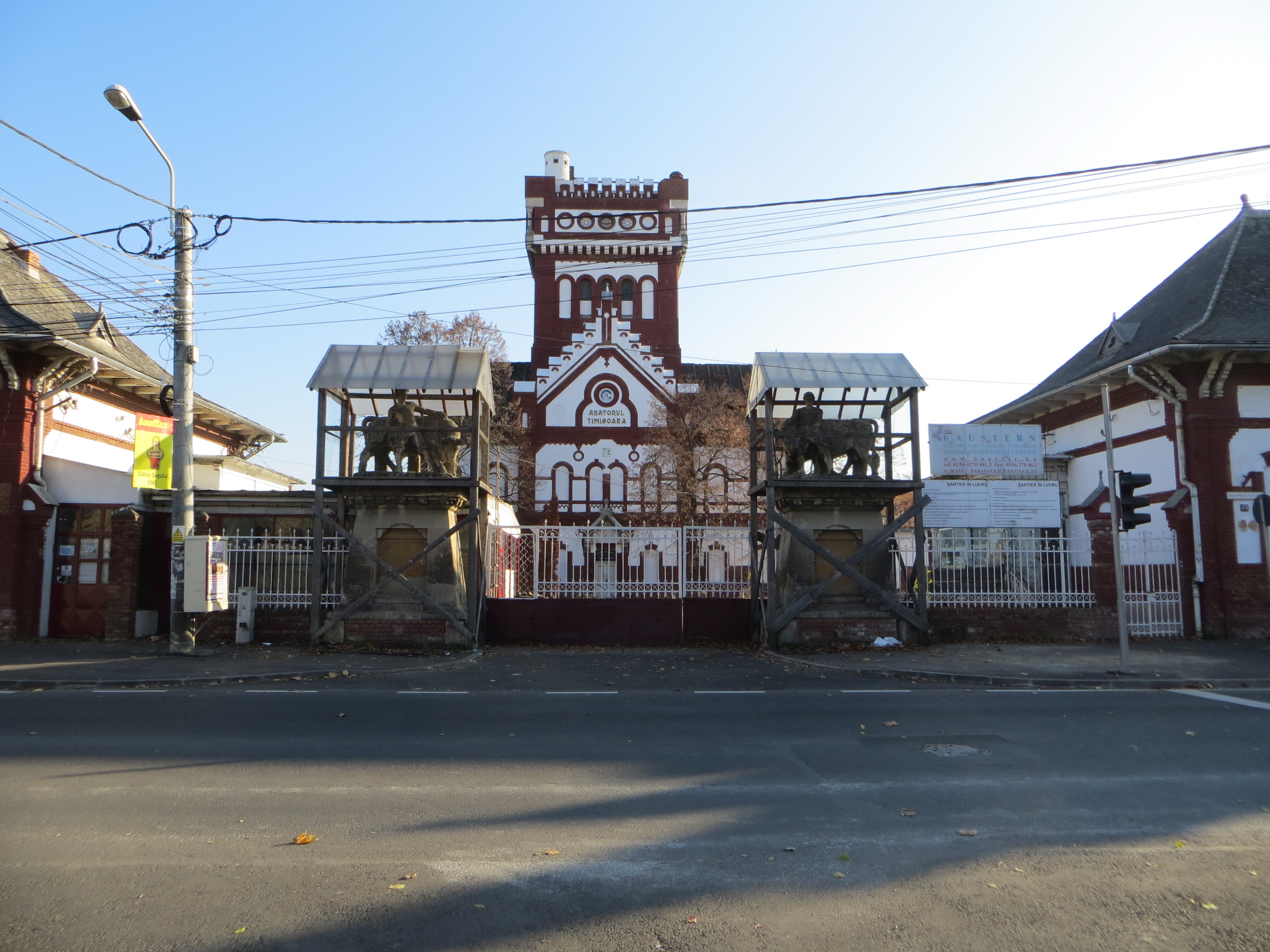
- Interactive map of the Communal Abattoir area

General information
- Architectural style: Secession
- Location: Timișoara, Romania
- Coordinates: 45°44′49″N 21°14′39″E
- Construction started: 1904
- Completed: 1905
- Closed: 1992
- Owner: Goldale Limited

Technical details
- Grounds: 48,877 m^{2}

Design and construction
- Architect: László Székely

The Communal Abattoir (Romanian: Abatorul Comunal) is an industrial building and historical monument in Timișoara, Romania.

== History ==
The abattoir was built between 1904 and 1905 according to the plans of Hungarian architect László Székely, on a vacant lot located between the Fabric and Elisabetin districts. The complex spread over 11 cadastral jugerums and initially had 11 buildings: for animal housing, slaughterhouses, cold rooms, offices, laboratories, even homes. László Székely's design for the communal abattoir was regarded as a success from the outset. As a result, he was commissioned to design similar facilities in Zrenjanin, Pančevo, and Sombor (in present-day Serbia), Kiskunhalas (Hungary), and Arad (Romania). The city milk factory operated in the premises of the abattoir, and in 1937 a meat canning factory was established, the production of which later ceased. The abattoir reduced its activity after 1990, and in 1992 it was permanently closed. After the numerous demolitions in the years that followed, the central tower, the side halls, the gate and the two statuary groups survived from the abattoir complex.

The land on which the abattoir is located was bought in 2005 by Spanish group Goldale Real Estate, part of Țiriac Holdings. It wanted to build a shopping mall on the site of the abattoir, but, due to the 2008 financial crisis, the investment never materialized. Later, it announced the construction of a mixed-use development with offices, homes, service spaces and hotel spaces, while preserving the existing buildings (declared historical monuments in 2015).

== Architecture ==
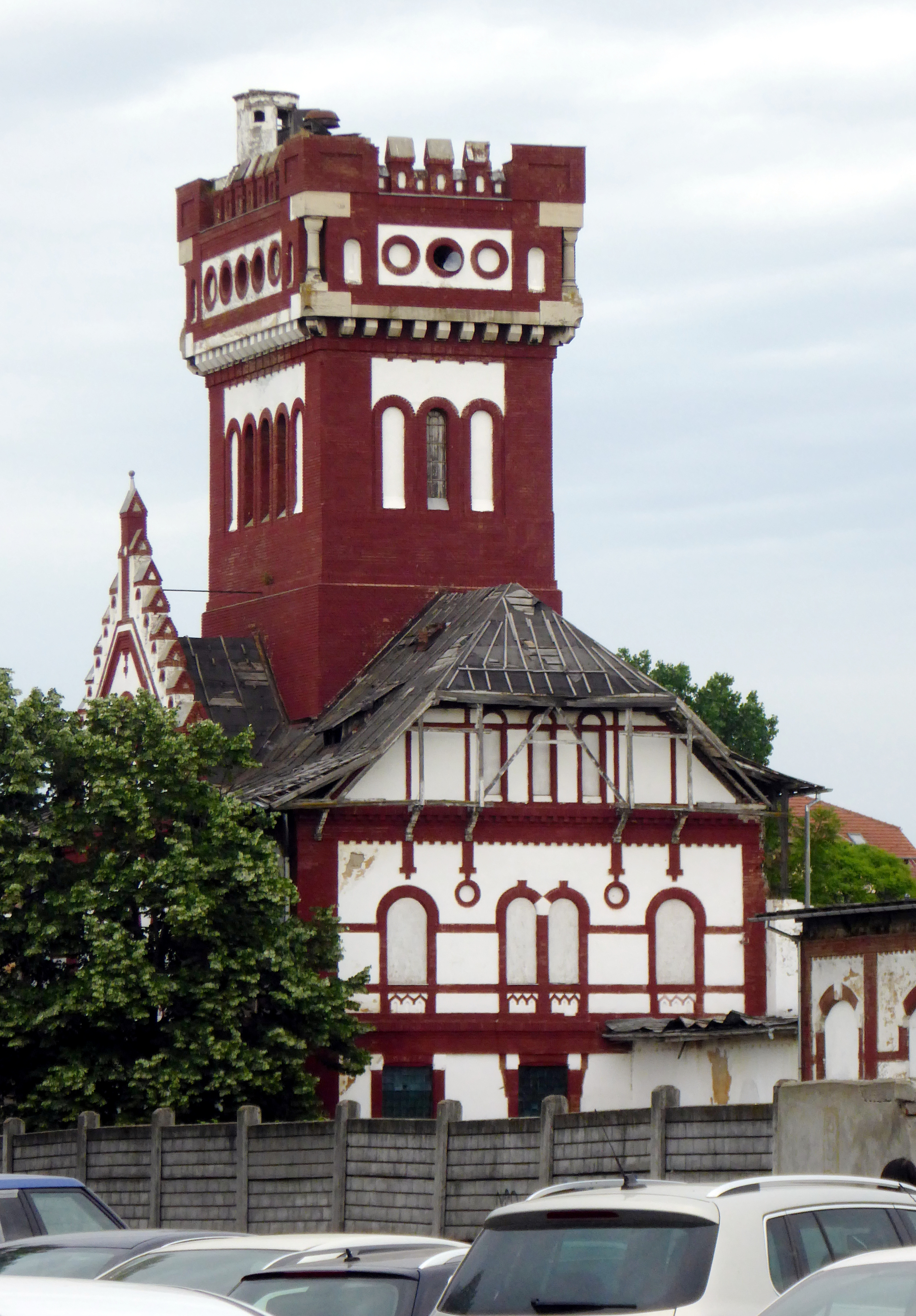
The campanile tower

From an architectural point of view, the most important is the central body, located at the entrance to the premises. Following the model of abattoirs built in Central Europe, the main body has the shape and silhouette of a medieval palace, which accentuates the status of the edifice as a major municipal endowment and illustrates the process of "monumentalization" of the forms specific to public buildings of the era. The facade is made of apparent brick and plastered surfaces, a distinct note being given by the window frames, also made of apparent brick. The roof stands out through the crenellated pediment, in the center of which there is a circle surrounded by a pointed arch and an imposing tower, made of the same apparent brick. The buildings were designed specifically to facilitate the slaughtering process, with materials carefully chosen both inside and out to ensure structural stability, maintain hygiene, and allow for easy cleaning.

The campanile tower that housed the water reservoir is inspired by the shapes of medieval municipal buildings, but also by similar and contemporary constructions in Central Europe, such as the abattoirs in Budapest and Ostrava. The gate of the abattoir is framed by the statues of the slaughterers and the two houses intended for the staff – one house served as the residence of the director of the abattoir, the second was occupied by offices and laboratories.
