= Bids for the 2020 Winter Youth Olympics =

Overview
- III Winter Youth Olympic Games
- Winner: Lausanne; Runner-up: Brașov

Details
- Committee: IOC
- Election venue: 128th IOC Session; Kuala Lumpur

Map of the bidding cities

Important dates
- First Bid: 28 November 2013
- Second bid: 12 December 2013
- Shortlist: 5 December 2014
- Decision: 31 July 2015

Decision
- Winner: Lausanne (71 votes)
- Runner-up: Brașov (10 votes)

Bids were due by 28 November 2013, the candidates cities were selected on 5 December 2014 and Lausanne was elected host city on 31 July 2015.

== Votes results ==
2020 Winter Youth Olympics bidding results
City	Nation	Votes
Lausanne	Switzerland	71
Brașov	Romania	10

== Bidding calendar ==
- 2013
  - 6 June: IOC Invites NOCs to submit applications for 2020 Winter Youth Olympics
  - 28 November: Deadline to Submit Bids to IOC
  - 12 December: Signature of YOG Candidature Procedure
- 2014
  - 14-16 January: IOC Workshop for 2020 YOG Applicant Cities in Lausanne
  - 17 June: Submission of YOG Application Files
  - 16-28 August: Observer Program at 2014 Summer Youth Olympics in Nanjing
  - 5 December: Candidates Cities Two Cities in Lausanne
- 2015
  - June 2015: Video conferences between Candidate Cities and IOC Evaluation Commission
  - 31 July: Election of the host city. Lausanne received 71 votes out of 81.

== Candidates cities ==
Two cities have submitted their application to the International Olympic Committee by the 28 November 2013 deadline.

=== Lausanne, Switzerland ===
Lausanne confirmed their bid for the 2020 Winter Youth Olympics on 12 July 2013. Lausanne is where the International Olympic Committee is headquartered and is considered to be the Olympic capital. On 12 December 2013, Lausanne was signed Youth Olympic Game Candidature Procedure.

=== Brașov, Romania ===
Brașov has officially submitted their bid for the 2020 Winter Youth Olympics in November 2013. In early 2013, Brașov hosted the 2013 European Youth Olympic Winter Festival. On 12 December 2013, Brașov was signed Youth Olympic Game Candidature Procedure.

== Other cities which had considered a bid ==
=== Europe ===
- Sofia, Bulgaria

Sofia bid to host the 1992 and 1994 Winter Olympics, but lost to Albertville and Lillehammer respectively. Sofia was going to bid for the 2016 Winter Youth Olympics but did not submit a bid citing that they did not fill the requirements set by the IOC. The Bulgarian Olympic Committee is interested in the city potentially bidding for the 2020 Winter Youth Olympics.

=== North America ===
- Lake Placid, United States

Lake Placid hosted the 1932 and 1980 Winter Olympics. Lake Placid was interested in bidding for the 2016 Winter Youth Olympics but opted to bid for 2020 instead. Lake Placid hosted the sixth IOC Athlete Career Program Forum on 8–11 November 2012.
