= Seven Ladders Canyon =

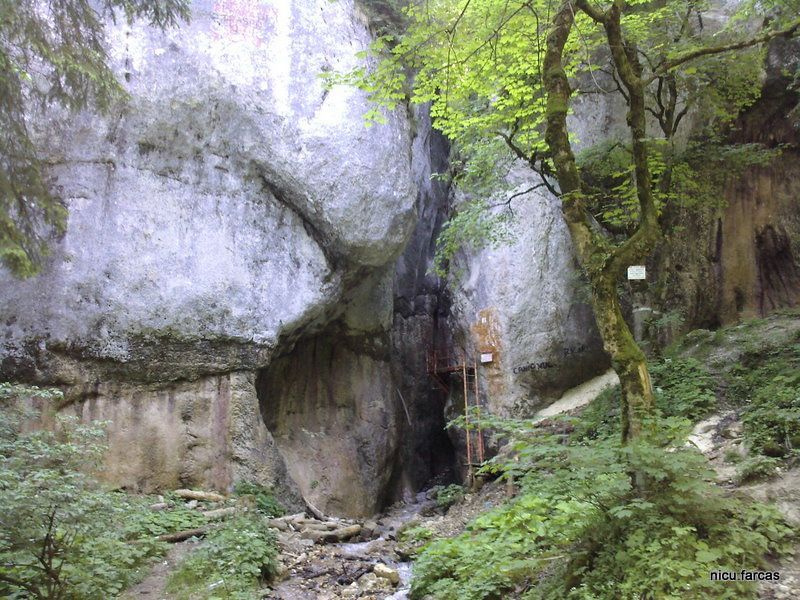
- Bottom entrance of the canyon

- Location within Romania
- Floor elevation: 980 m (3,220 ft)
- Length: 160 metres (520 ft) North-West to South-East
- Depth: 58 metres (190 ft)

Geology
- Type: Canyon

Geography
- Location: Piatra Mare Mountains, Brașov, Romania
- Coordinates: 45°34′3″N 25°38′36″E
- Traversed by: Șapte Scări Brook
- Interactive map of Seven Ladders Canyon

The Seven Ladders Canyon (Romanian: Canionul Șapte Scări) is a mountainous canyon carved by the Șapte Scări Brook in Romania in the county of Brașov, south of Dâmbul Morii village. It is considered to be one of the main tourist attractions from the Piatra Mare massif.

The canyon has been carved in Jurassic limestone and is composed by seven waterfalls, the tallest being 35 metres (115 ft) high. The trail within the canyon is arranged with metal stairs and platforms.

7 stairs Canyon, or the "subdivision" of Piatra Mare Mountain miracles, is composed of exactly 7 slope bits illustrating the 7 waterfalls that give the name of the canyon. The 7 steps pass with heights between 2.5 meters and 15 meters turn into cascades when the water volume of the river Seven Stairs increases.
