= Emil Imre =

Romanian short track speed skater

Personal information
- Born: 8 March 1996 (age 30) Miercurea Ciuc, Romania

Sport
- Country: Romania
- Sport: Short track speed skating
- Club: Csíkszeredai ISK
- Coached by: Mária Bogyó-Löffler
Medal record
Men's short track speed skating
Representing Romania
European Youth Olympic Festival
Gold medal – first place	2013 Braşov	1000 m
Silver medal – second place	2013 Braşov	500 m

Emil Imre (Hungarian pronunciation: [ˈɛmil ˈimrɛ]; born 8 March 1996) is a Romanian short track speed skater of Hungarian ethnicity.

Imre's greatest achievement up to date is a gold medal he won in the 1000 metres event at the 2013 European Youth Olympic Winter Festival (EYOWF). This was also the first Romanian gold in the competition's history, having collected four bronze medals at the previous editions. Additionally, Imre finished second and earned the silver medal in the 500 metres race at the EYOWF.

== Personal records ==
Updated 30 November 2013

Distance	Time	Date set	Place	Event
222 meters	24.543	24 March 2007	Budapest, Hungary	Pannonia Cup
333 meters	36.317	2 December 2006	Budapest, Hungary	Santa Claus Cup
500 meters	43.962	13 September 2013	Vienna, Austria	Austrian Open
1000 meters	1:31.806	15 November 2013	Kolomna, Russia	Samsung ISU World Cup
1500 meters	2:25.492	26 September 2013	Shanghai, PR China	Samsung ISU World Cup
