= Lausanne bid for the 2020 Winter Youth Olympics =

Lausanne 2020

Bids for the 2020 Winter Youth Olympics
Overview
- III Winter Youth Olympic Games
- Winner: Lausanne; Runner-up: Brașov

Details
- City: Lausanne, Switzerland
- NOC: Swiss Olympic Association

Previous Games hosted
- none

Decision
- Result: Winner (71 votes)

Lausanne 2020 was a successful bid by the city of Lausanne and the Swiss Olympic Association to host the 2020 Winter Youth Olympics. The IOC selected the host city for the 2020 Winter Youth Olympics at the 128th IOC Session in Kuala Lumpur, Malaysia on 31 July 2015, which Lausanne won.

== History ==
=== Applicant city phase ===
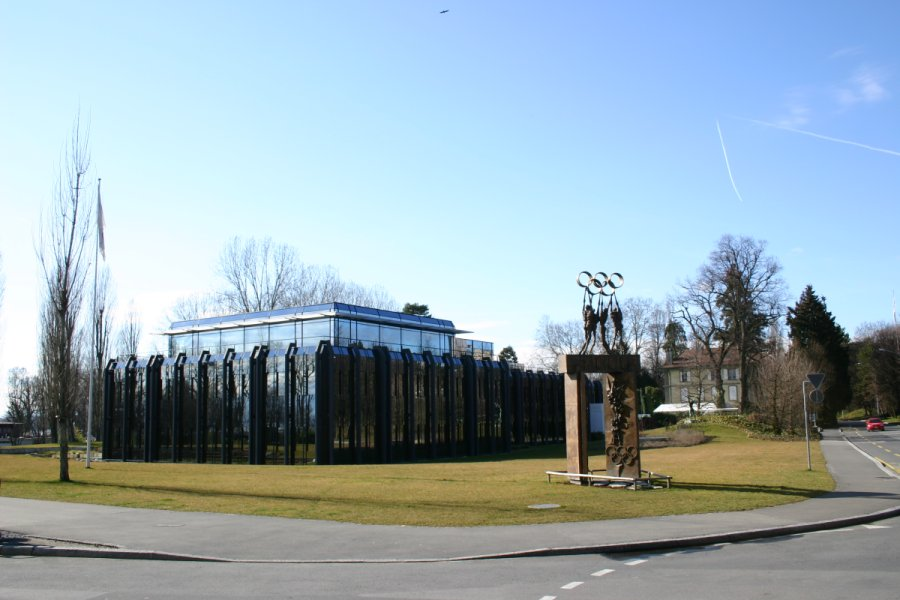
The headquarters of the International Olympic Committee in Lausanne.

Lausanne's bid for the 2020 Winter Youth Olympics was confirmed on 12 July 2013. The city is where the International Olympic Committee is headquartered. Lausanne is also home to many sport federations. The bid was formally put forward in August 2013. Lausanne was signed Youth Olympic Game Candidature Procedure on 12 December 2013.

== Previous bids ==
The city of Lausanne made several bids in the past. Lausanne bid to host the Summer Olympics in 1936 but lost to Berlin. The city again bid for the 1944 Summer Olympics which was awarded to London, however those games were cancelled because of the Second World War. London hosted the 1948 Summer Olympics. Lausanne bid to host the 1960 Summer Olympics but lost to Rome.

=== Previous bids by other Swiss cities ===
St. Moritz hosted the 1928 and 1948 Winter Olympics. St Moritz unsuccessfully bid to host the 1936 and 1960 Winter Olympics and lost to Garmisch-Partenkirchen and Squaw Valley respectively.

Sion bid to host the 1976, 2002 and 2006 Winter Olympics but lost to Denver, Salt Lake City and Turin respectively. Denver pulled out as host of the 1976 games and Innsbruck ultimately hosted the games.

== Venues ==
=== Lausanne ===
- Palais de Beaulieu – Figure skating, short track, curling
- Stade Pierre de Coubertin – Opening and closing ceremonies, medal ceremonies
- UNIL-EPFL Sport Centre – Speed skating
- Centre intercommunal de glace de Malley – Hockey
- Lausanne campus – Olympic village

=== Jura ===
- Prémanon, France – Ski jumping, Biathlon, Nordic Combined
- Le Brassus – Cross-country Skiing

=== Alps ===
- Leysin
- Les Mosses
- Les Diablerets
- Villars-sur-Ollon
