= Ski jumping at the 2013 European Youth Olympic Winter Festival =

- Venue: Valea Cărbunării Ski Jumping Hill, Râșnov
- Date: 18–22 February

Ski jumping at the 2013 European Youth Olympic Winter Festival was held in Râșnov, Romania at the Valea Cărbunării Ski Jumping Hill in the Râșnov Sports Complex from the 18th to the 22nd of February 2013.

== Results ==
=== Medal table ===
Rank	Nation	Gold	Silver	Bronze	Total
1	Germany (GER)	2	2	1	5
2	Slovenia (SLO)	2	2	0	4
3	Czech Republic (CZE)	1	0	0	1
4	Austria (AUT)	0	1	3	4
5	Russia (RUS)	0	0	1	1
Totals (5 entries)		5	5	5	15

=== Men's events ===
Event	Gold				Silver				Bronze			
Individual	Cene Prevc (SLO)	97.5	98.5	261.0	Anže Lanišek (SLO)	96.0	97.5	256.0	Thomas Hofer (AUT)	93.0	96.0	246.5
Team	Slovenia (SLO); Nejc Seretinek; Cene Prevc; Florjan Jelovčan; Anže Lanišek	92.0; 99.0; 94.5; 98.5	91.5; 97.0; 93.5; 90.5	987.5; 233.5; 263.0; 245.0; 246.0	Germany (GER); Paul Winter; Julian Hahn; Thomas Dufter; Sebastian Bradatsch	93.0; 89.5; 95.5; 96.0	95.0; 92.5; 94.0; 90.0	952.0; 242.5; 229.5; 242.0; 238.0	Austria (AUT); Maximilian Steiner; Mario Mendel; Simon Greiderer; Thomas Hofer	96.0; 86.0; 94.5; 97.0	98.0; 83.0; 92.0; 91.0	935.0; 256.0; 196.5; 240.0; 242.5

=== Ladies events ===
Event	Gold				Silver				Bronze			
Individual	Anna Rupprecht (GER)	49.5	49.5	225.0	Sonja Schoitsch (AUT)	51.5	51.0	224.9	Lena Selbach (GER)	49.5	49.0	223.3
Team	Czech Republic (CZE); Karolina Indrackova; Michaela Rajnochova; Natalie Dejmkova; Barbora Blazkova	60.0; 62.5; 60.5; 63.5	59.0; 63.5; 59.5; 62.0	812.9; 188.4; 212.2; 200.3; 212.0	Germany (GER); Celina Dollberg; Carina Wursthorn; Lena Selbach; Anna Rupprecht	62.5; 54.0; 65.0; 64.5	60.0; 52.0; 64.0; 64.0	801.6; 200.8; 160.2; 221.9; 218.7	Russia (RUS); Alina Bobrakova; Aysylu Fakhertdinova; Alena Sutiagina; Kristina Zakirova	57.5; 53.0; 55.0; 54.5	56.5; 53.5; 51.5; 56.0	658.7; 171.4; 162.9; 161.4; 163.0

=== Mixed events ===
Event	Gold				Silver				Bronze			
Team	Germany (GER); Lena Selbach; Anna Rupprecht; Thomas Dufter; Sebastian Bradatsch	63.0; 64.5; 60.0; 67.0	66.0; 62.5; 60.5; 68.5	888.5; 219.4; 221.6; 199.5; 248.0	Slovenia (SLO); Anja Javoršek; Julija Sršen; Anže Lanišek; Cene Prevc	57.0; 65.5; 64.0; 72.0	60.5; 60.5; 67.0; 68.5	860.7; 190.8; 182.7; 230.7; 256.5	Austria (AUT); Elisabeth Raudaschl; Sonja Schoitsch; Maximilian Steiner; Thomas Hofer	60.0; 62.5; 67.5; 68.5	63.5 68.0; 71.0	812.7; 206.7; 106.9; 243.5; 255.6
