= Piatra Mare Mountains =

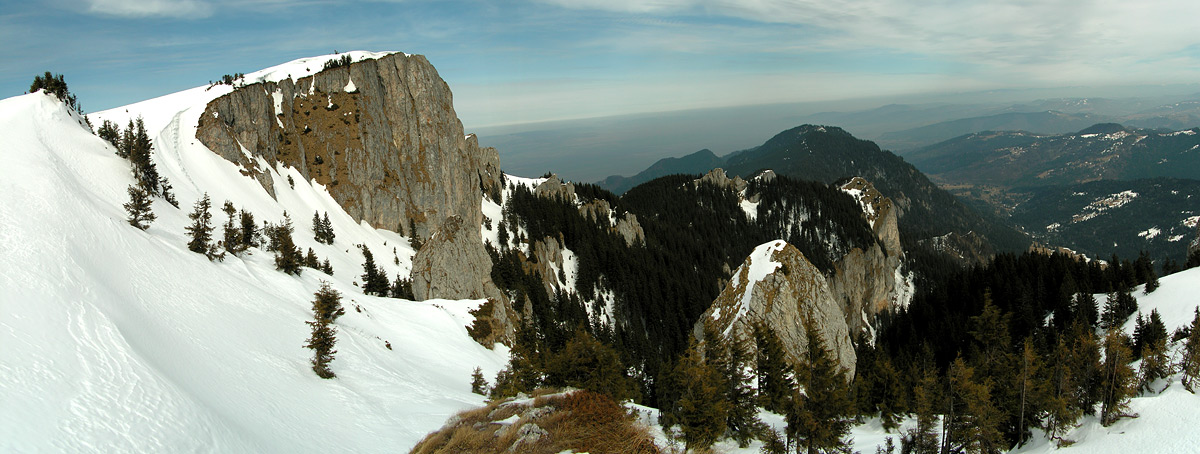
Piatra Mare Mountains

The Piatra Mare Mountains (Hungarian: Nagykőhavas, German: Hohensteingebirge) is a small mountain range in Brașov County, southeast of Brașov, Romania, close to the resort town of Predeal.

Geologically, the Piatra Mare Mountains stand at the southern end of the grand arc of the Eastern Carpathians, between the inner ring of the Inner Eastern Carpathians and the outer ring of the Outer Eastern Carpathians. The neighbouring Postăvarul Massif is also positioned in the same transitional area.

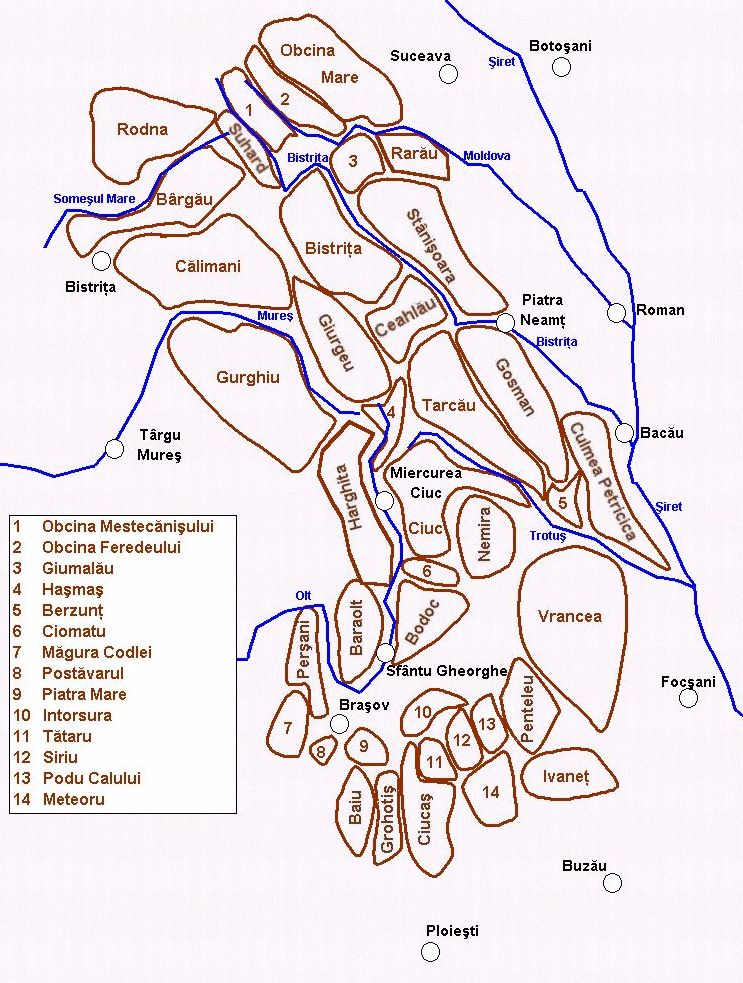
map, with the Piatra Mare Mountains marked as group #9

The range consists mainly of limestone and Carpathian flysch. The rock forms a predominantly north–south ridge, from which structured side combs extend to the west, and steep drops to the east. The highest peak, also called Piatra Mare, stands at 1844 m (although sources differ on the exact height).

Since 2015 the area was filed with recreational activities, such as a zip line that starts at the 7 steps cascades and ends at Dâmbul Morii.

The seven cascades area was rebuilt in 2014.

The mountain is a popular recreation and hiking area. In addition to the treeless summit that allows an unobstructed panoramic view in all directions, the main landmarks are:

- the Ice Cave, Peștera de Gheață
- the Seven Ladders Canyon, Canionul Șapte Scări
- the Tamina gorge, Cascada Tamina

== Tourism ==
Piatra Mare is a popular hiking destination:

- Peștera de Gheață, ice cave
- Seven Ladders Canyon (Romanian: Canionul Şapte Scări) (Wikimapia)
- Piatra Mare Chalet (1628m) (Wikimapia)
