= Alpine skiing at the 2013 European Youth Olympic Winter Festival =

- Venue: Sub Teleferic, Poiana Brașov Ice Rink
- Date: 18–22 February

Alpine skiing at the 2013 European Youth Olympic Winter Festival was held at the Sub Teleferic slope in Poiana Brașov, Romania from 18 to 22 February 2013.

== Results ==
=== Medal table ===
| Rank | Nation | Gold | Silver | Bronze | Total |
|---|---|---|---|---|---|
| 1 | Austria (AUT) | 2 | 2 | 1 | 5 |
| 2 | Italy (ITA) | 1 | 2 | 0 | 3 |
| 3 | Slovenia (SLO) | 1 | 1 | 1 | 3 |
| 4 | Norway (NOR) | 1 | 0 | 0 | 1 |
| 5 | France (FRA) | 0 | 0 | 2 | 2 |
| 6 | Switzerland (SUI) | 0 | 0 | 1 | 1 |
| Totals (6 entries) | | 5 | 5 | 5 | 15 |

=== Men's events ===
| Event | Gold | | Silver | | Bronze | |
|---|---|---|---|---|---|---|
| Giant Slalom | Manuel Annewanter (AUT) | 1:45.90 | Mathias Elmar Graf (AUT) | 1:46.41 | Elie Gateau (FRA) | 1:46.51 |
| Slalom | Štefan Hadalin (SLO) | 1:31.69 | Aljaž Dvornik (SLO) | 1:32.23 | Elie Gateau (FRA) | 1:32.80 |

=== Ladies' events ===
| Event | Gold | | Silver | | Bronze | |
|---|---|---|---|---|---|---|
| Giant Slalom | Verena Gasslitter (ITA) | 1:43.77 | Roberta Melesi (ITA) | 1:43.85 | Christina Ager (AUT) | 1:44.44 |
| Slalom | Nora Grieg Christensen (NOR) | 1:33.78 | Christina Ager (AUT) | 1:33.97 | Saša Brezovnik (SLO) | 1:34.32 |

=== Mixed events ===
| Event | Gold | Silver | Bronze |
|---|---|---|---|
| Parallel Giant Slalom | Austria (AUT); Christina Ager; Elisabeth Reisinger; Theresa Steinlechner; Manuel Annewanter; Mathias Elmar Graf; Marco Schwarz | Italy (ITA); Nicole Delago; Veronica Olivieri; Verena Gasslitter; Hannes Zingerle; Tommaso Sala; Frederico Liberatore | Switzerland (SUI); Vanessa Kasper; Julie Dayer; Elena Stoffel; Sandro Simonet; Nils Hintermann; Janic Hofmann |
