= Ice hockey at the 2013 European Youth Olympic Winter Festival =

2013 European Youth Olympic Winter Festival – Ice hockey

Tournament details
- Host country: Romania
- Venue: 1 (in 1 host city)
- Dates: 18–22 February 2013
- Teams: 6

Final positions
- Champions: Finland
- Runners-up: Russia
- Third place: Switzerland
- Fourth place: Czech Republic

Tournament statistics
- Games played: 9

Ice hockey at the 2013 European Youth Olympic Winter Festival was a men's under-18 ice hockey tournament played during the Braşov 2013 edition of the European Youth Olympic Festival (EYOF). It was held at the Brașov Olympic Ice Rink in Braşov, Romania from 18 to 22 February 2013.

== Results ==
=== Medal table ===
Rank	Nation	Gold	Silver	Bronze	Total
1	Finland (FIN)	1	0	0	1
2	Russia (RUS)	0	1	0	1
3	Switzerland (SUI)	0	0	1	1
Totals (3 entries)		1	1	1	3

=== Medalists ===
Event	Gold	Silver	Bronze
Boys Team	Team Finland; Finland	Team Russia; Russia	Team Switzerland; Switzerland

== Group stage ==
=== Group A ===
Team	GP	W	OTW	OTL	L	GF	GA	DIF	Pts
Russia	2	2	0	0	0	9	3	+6	6
Switzerland	2	1	0	0	1	6	7	−1	3
Latvia	2	0	0	0	2	3	8	-5	0

All times local (UTC+02:00)

February 18, 2013; 16:00	Russia	6 – 1	Switzerland	Brașov Olympic Ice Rink

Game reference

February 19, 2013; 16:00	Switzerland	5 – 1	Latvia	Brașov Olympic Ice Rink

February 20, 2013; 16:00	Latvia	2 – 3	Russia	Brașov Olympic Ice Rink

=== Group A ===
Team	GP	W	OTW	OTL	L	GF	GA	DIF	Pts
Finland	2	2	0	0	0	22	4	+18	6
Czech Republic	2	1	0	0	1	11	11	+0	3
Romania	2	0	0	0	2	1	19	-18	0

All times local (UTC+02:00)

February 18, 2013; 20:00	Finland	10 – 4	Czech Republic	Brașov Olympic Ice Rink

Game reference

February 19, 2013; 20:00	Romania	0 – 12	Finland	Brașov Olympic Ice Rink

12 min	Penalties	8 min
30	Shots	30

February 20, 2013; 20:00	Czech Republic	7 – 1	Romania	Brașov Olympic Ice Rink

== Knockout stage ==
All times local (UTC+02:00)

=== 5th place match ===
February 21, 2013; 16:00	Latvia	11 – 1	Romania	Brașov Olympic Ice Rink

=== 3rd place match ===
February 21, 2013; 20:00	Switzerland	2 – 1	Czech Republic	Brașov Olympic Ice Rink

=== Final ===
February 22, 2013; 14:30	Russia	2 – 4	Finland	Brașov Olympic Ice Rink
