= Satasairaala =

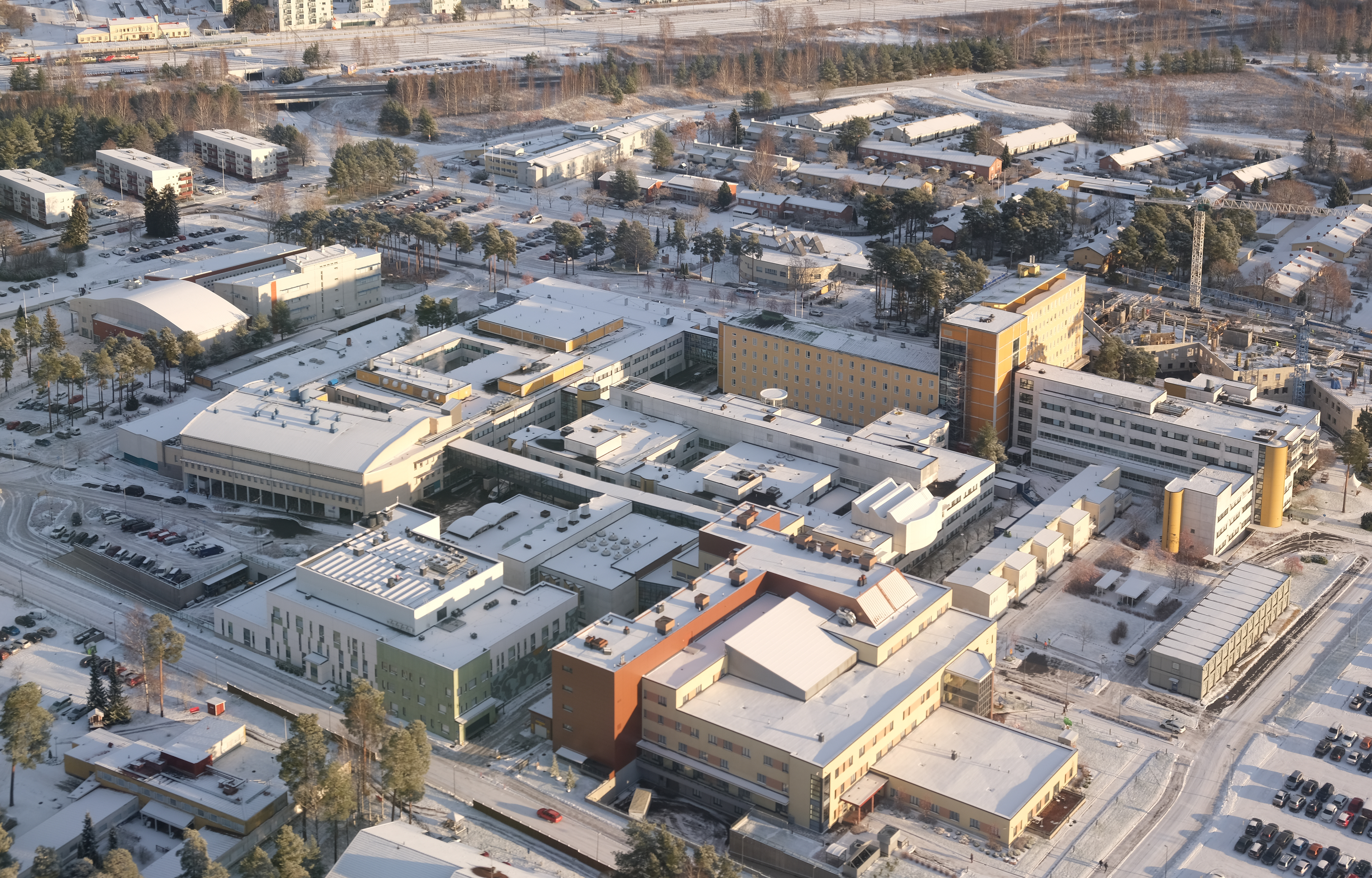
- Aerial view of the hospital

Geography
- Location: Pori, Satakunta, Finland

History
- Former names: Porin yleinen sairaala (1878–1965); Satakunnan keskussairaala (1965–2018)
- Constructed: 1875
- Opened: 1878

Links
- Website: satakunnanhyvinvointialue.fi

Satasairaala (previously Satakunnan keskussairaala) is a hospital located in the Tiilimäki district of Pori, Finland. Satasairaala is the central hospital of the Satakunta region and is owned by the Satakunnan sairaanhoitopiiri.

== History ==
Porin yleinen sairaala started operations in 1878 when the senate decided to open a new hospital in the northern part of the Turku and Pori Province. For this, they bought a building from the Itätulli district. Going into the 20th century, the hospital did not meet the official healthcare regulations of the region. The hospital had only 55 beds, so people could not fit into the hospital. The inside of the hospital was too dark. The Porin kaupunginsairaala was opened to help the hospital with the overwhelming number of patients.

In 1965, the hospital was given a new name, Satakunnan keskussairaala (abbreviated SATKS or SatKs)

SatKs was renamed to Satasairaala in 2018.
