= Ion Țiriac Sports Complex =

Outdoor sporting venue in Brașov, Romania

Coordinates: 45°38′17″N 25°35′14″E

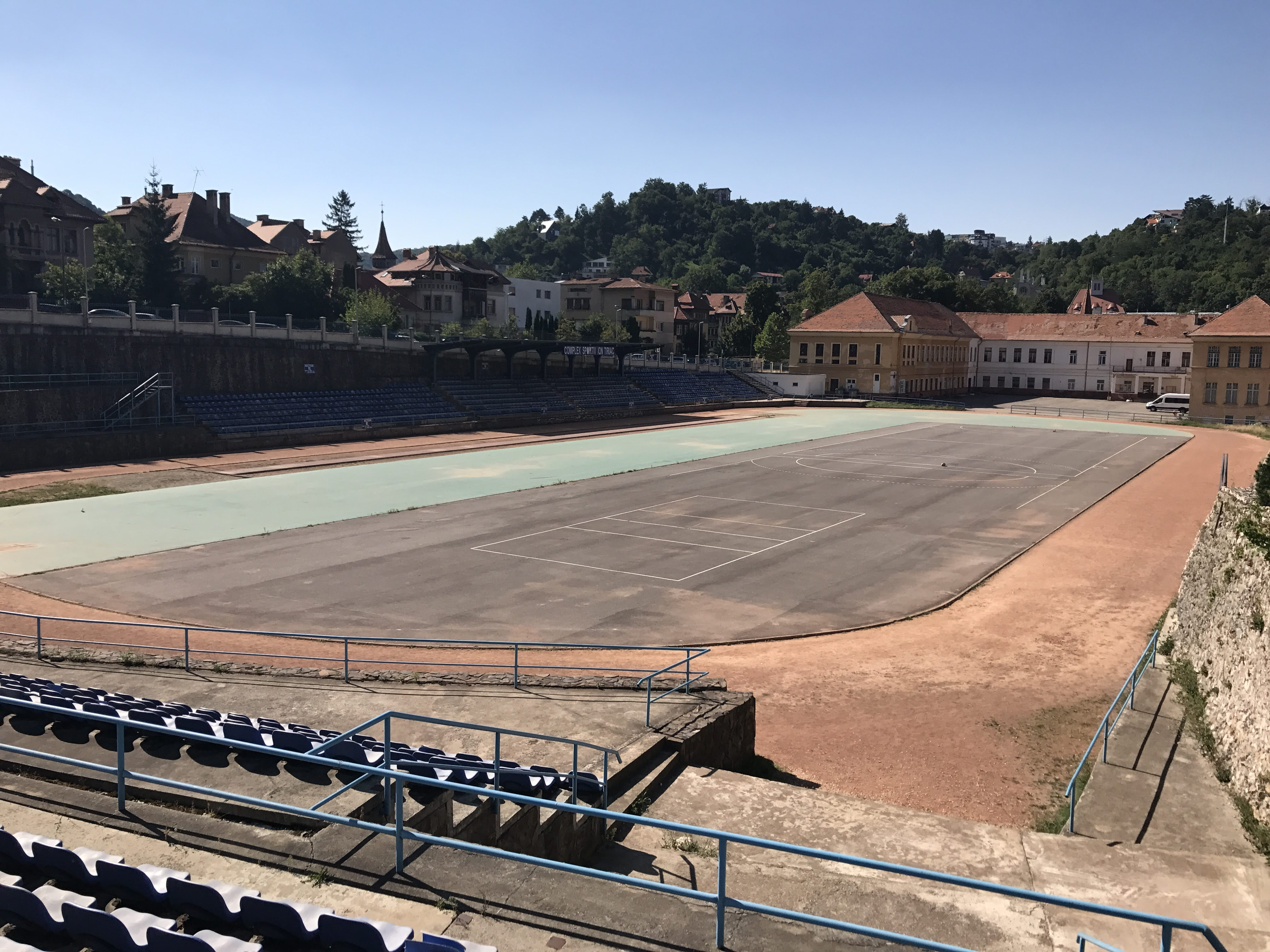
- Interactive map of Ion Țiriac Sports Complex
- Location: Brașov, Romania
- Owner: Brașov County
- Capacity: 2,300

Construction
- Renovated: 2010

The Ion Țiriac Sports Complex is an outdoor sporting venue in Brașov, Romania, operated by the Brașov Sports High School, located within the same area. It is named after the world-famous tennis player Ion Țiriac, who originates from Brașov.

== Facilities ==
The field was renovated in 2010 and features a clay running track, a tartan track for sprint, a tarmac surface for handball and volleyball, as wells as two jumping areas. The stands have a total capacity of 2,300 seats, a part of them being covered. Outside classes, it is open to the public for free.

== Events ==
In February 2013, the arena hosted the opening and the closing ceremonies of the European Youth Olympic Winter Festival, which were attended by the International Olympic Committee President Jacques Rogge. For this event, a temporary second stand was added for athletes, trainers and referees.

In March and August 2008, it hosted two editions of the Brașov Rally Show, a super special stage held on clay in two of the rallies held in Brașov in that season of the Romanian Rally Championship.

Between 2010 and 2016, it also hosted the local Oktoberfest beer festival, held every year in the month of September and which attracts thousands of participants.
