= Țiriac Holdings =

Romanian company

Țiriac Holdings Ltd.
- Type: Private
- Industry: financial services, banking, insurance, retail, real estate, distribution, media, construction
- Founded: 1990
- Headquarters: Bucharest, Romania
- Key people: Ion Țiriac, President; Anca Ioan, CEO
- Number of employees: 2000

Țiriac Holdings Ltd. is a Romanian company primarily owned by Ion Țiriac. Among its operations are car dealership, vehicle leasing, real estate, elevator manufacturing, transport and leasing of executive jets (Țiriac Air), banking (UniCredit Țiriac Bank), and insurance (Allianz Țiriac). It also has a 49% interest in a joint venture with DaimlerChrysler for the sales and marketing of all DaimlerChrysler automotive brands in Romania. Allianz Tiriac was founded initially under the name ASIT – Asigurari Ion Țiriac in 1994. ASIT was integrated in 2000 in Allianz Group.
