= Brașov Olympic Ice Rink =

Ice rink in Brașov, Romania

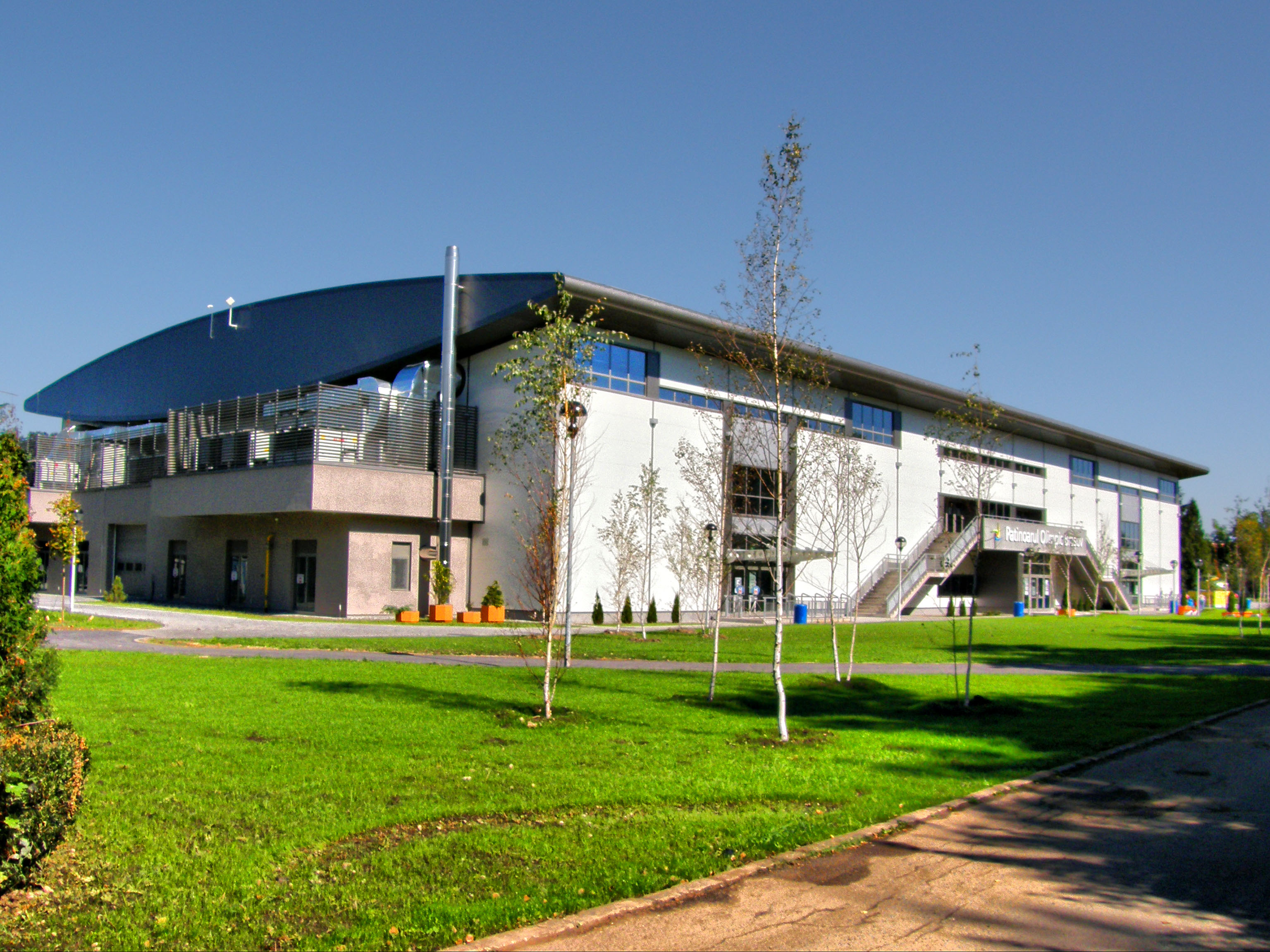
- Interactive map of Brașov Olympic Ice Rink
- Full name: Patinoarul Olimpic Brașov
- Location: Brașov, Romania
- Coordinates: 45°39′49″N 25°36′44″E
- Owner: Municipality of Brașov
- Capacity: 2,000 (1,600 seated)

Construction
- Groundbreaking: May 2008
- Opened: January 2010
- Cost: €9.1 million

Tenant
- Corona Brașov

The Brașov Olympic Ice Rink (Romanian: Patinoarul Olimpic Brașov) is a multi-purpose ice rink in Brașov, Romania. Located at number 5 Turnului Street which is 5 minutes walking distance from the railway station and easily accessible by public transportation, it was opened in January 2010.

== Construction ==
The construction of the rink began on 16 May 2008. The proposed location was the Sports Park (then Tractorul Park), 730 metres north-west, in the place of a disused artificial pond.

The rink was inaugurated on the 18 January 2010, with the goal of hosting competitions at the 2013 European Youth Olympic Winter Festival.

The ice rink was first tested on 18 February 2010 by Tanja Szewczenko and Norman Jeschke and officially later that day with an ice hockey game between Corona Brașov and Steaua Rangers.

== Technical details ==
There are three general areas:

- Areas for sportsmen:
  - Special access for sportsmen, referees and officials
  - 6 locker rooms with 25 places each
  - Locker room for the referees with 5 places
  - First aid room and doping control rooms
  - 2 gyms
- Areas for the public:
  - 4 staircases in the corners of the hall, each with a bathroom at the base
  - 1,584 seats
  - 3 evacuation staircases, and terraces on the second floor and around the building
  - areas for renting skates, selling tickets, public locker room, bar, each with a bathroom
- Areas for the officials: separate access, conference room, administrative and storage rooms, bathrooms, special access for the resurfacer, inside and outside technical areas

The possibility exists to extend the seating capacity for special events, in which case the hall could host a total of over 2,000 people, including 400 standing.

The temperature in the spectator area is usually around 16 degrees Celsius, and that of the ice can range, depending on the event, between –6 (for figure skating) to –15 (for hockey).

The ice is levelled using an Olympia ice resurfacer built by Resurfice Corporation.

The rink contains removable tribunes and the locker rooms can be used simultaneously by 120 athletes. Also, the necessary material equipments have been executed, such as furniture, displaying and sounding system, ventilation equipments and refrigerating systems.

== Gallery ==
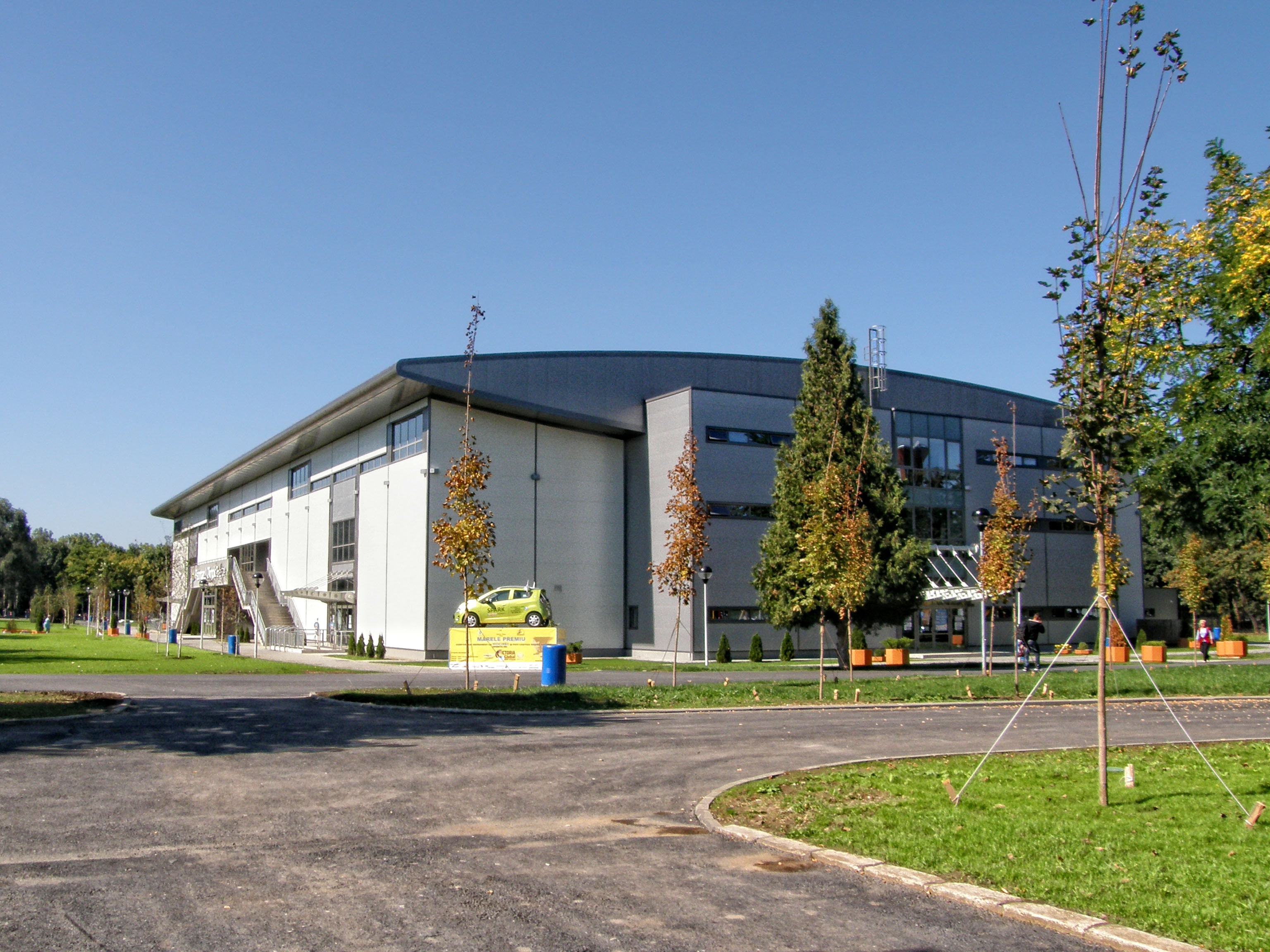

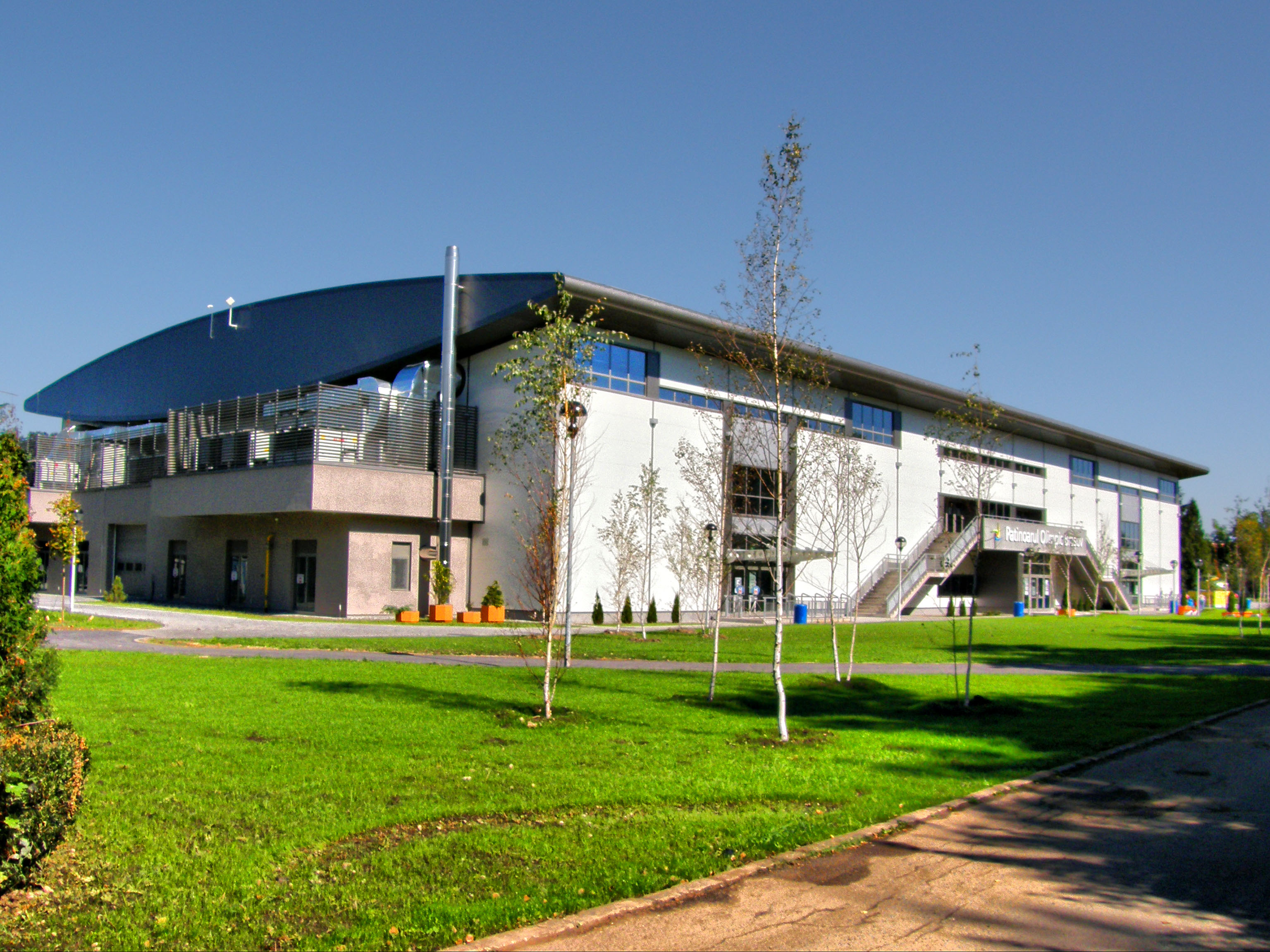

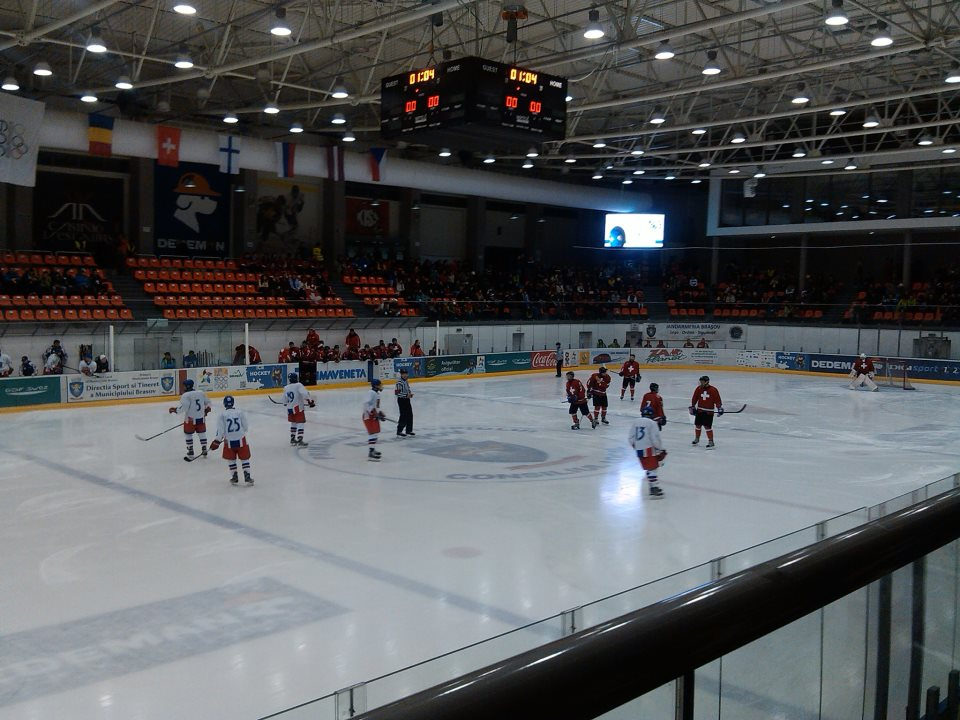
