= Predeal =

- Town
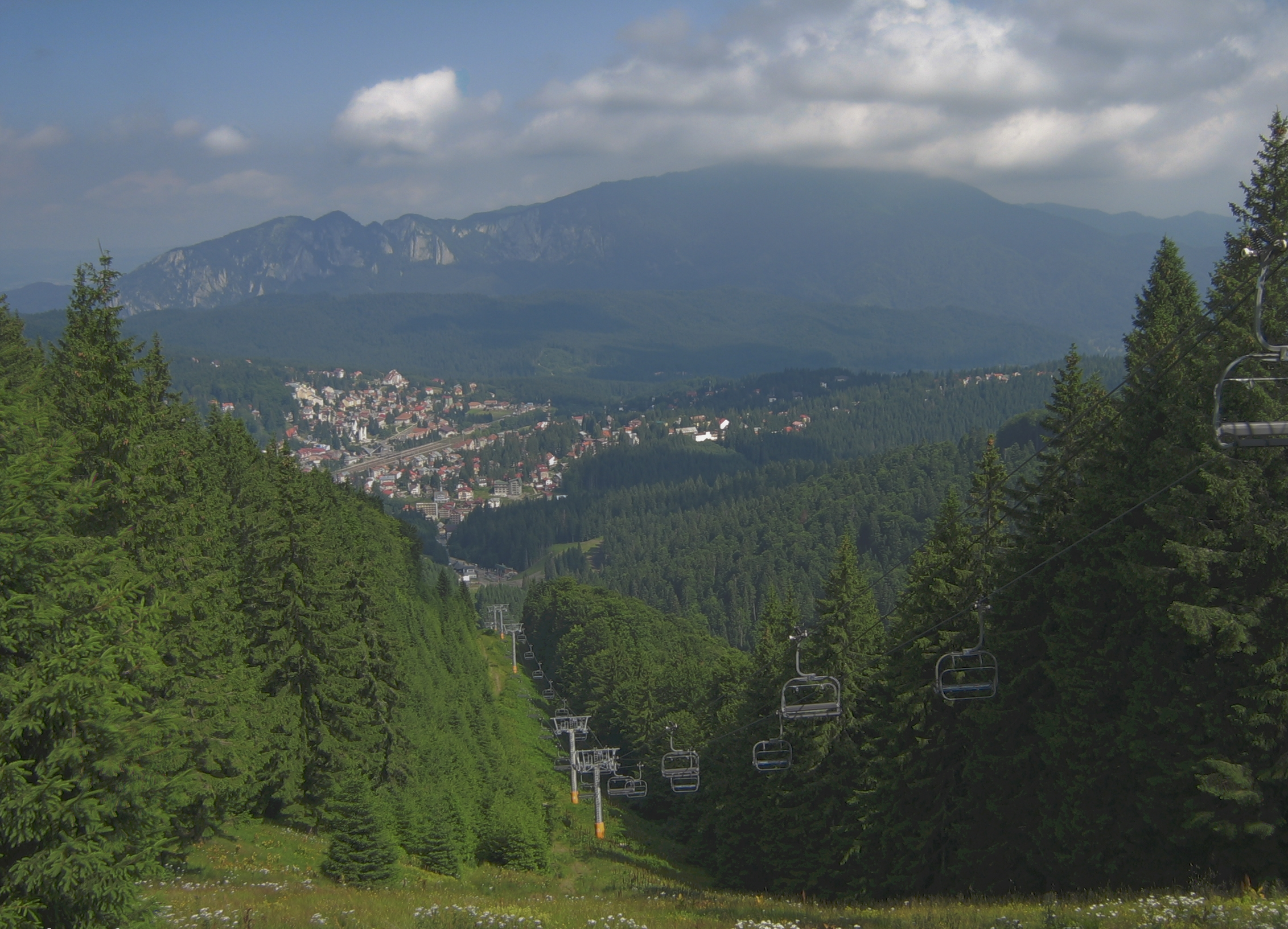
- View of Predeal from Clăbucet-plecare Chalet (1,445m); behind is the Postăvarul massif

- Seal

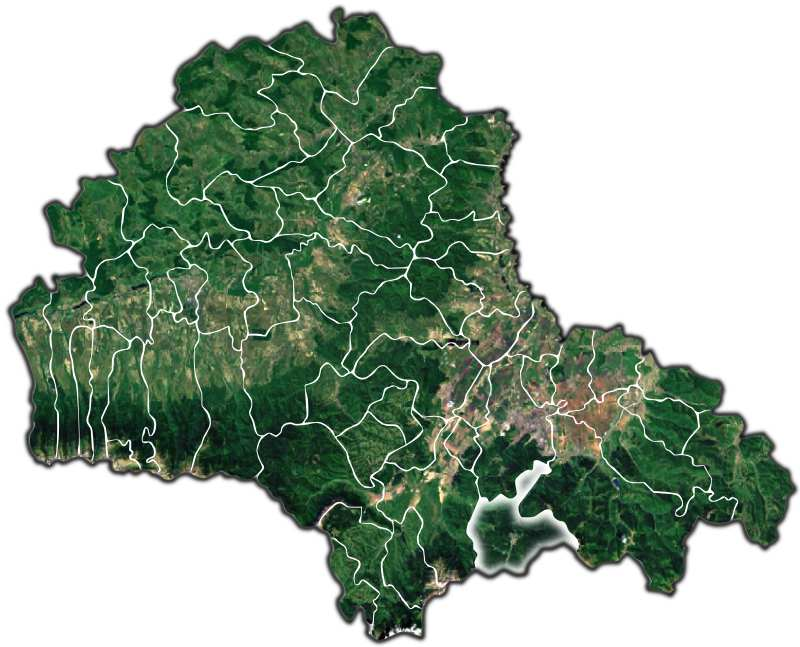
- Administrative territory of Predeal in Brașov County

- Location in Romania
- Coordinates: 45°30′16″N 25°34′42″E
- Country: Romania
- County: Brașov
- Established: 26 February 1705 (first attestation)
- Subdivisions: Pârâul Rece, Timișu de Jos, Timișu de Sus

Government
  - Mayor (2024–2028): Sorin Ciobanu (PNL)
- Area: 57.1 km^{2} (22.0 sq mi)
- Highest elevation: 1,107 m (3,632 ft)
- Lowest elevation: 1,030 m (3,380 ft)
- Population (2021-12-01): 4,020
  - Density: 70.4/km^{2} (182/sq mi)
- Time zone: UTC+02:00 (EET)
  - Summer (DST): UTC+03:00 (EEST)
- Postal code: 505300
- Area code: (+40) 0268
- Vehicle reg.: BV
- Website: www.primaria-predeal.ro

Predeal (pronounced [preˈde̯al]; Hungarian: Predeál) is a town in Brașov County, Romania. Predeal, a mountain resort town, is the highest town in Romania. It is located in the Prahova Valley, Muntenia at an elevation of over 1,000 m (3,300 ft). The town administers three villages: Pârâul Rece, Timișu de Jos, and Timișu de Sus. Predeal is twinned with Macugnaga, Italy.

Beginning in the 2000s, the area experienced a boom in construction, and now many wealthy families own mountain retreats in Predeal. During the 2013 European Youth Olympic Winter Festival, it hosted the cross-country skiing and snowboarding competitions.

== Name ==
The name Predeal is derived from the Slavic word predel, which means "border".

== History ==
The town was severely damaged during the Battle of Predeal Pass in World War I. Although the town itself was lost to the attacking Central Powers' forces, the battle ultimately resulted in a Romanian defensive victory.

== Geography ==
Predeal is situated in the Centru development region of Romania, in the Prahova Valley, in the southern part of Brașov County. Neighboring towns include Azuga to the south, Bușteni to the southwest, Râșnov to the northwest, and the city of Brașov to the north.

The town is mountainous, with the Piatra Mare Mountains to the north, the Bucegi Mountains to the southwest, and the Postăvarul Massif to the northwest. The woods around Predeal have a rich and diversified fauna, including a high number of wild boars, European pine martens, bears, foxes, gray wolves, deer, squirrels, rabbits, badgers, and heather cocks.

== Climate ==
Predeal has a humid continental climate (Dfb in the Köppen climate classification), with a warm summer and a cold snowy winter.

Climate data for Predeal (2014–2026, extremes 1961-present)
| Month | Jan | Feb | Mar | Apr | May | Jun | Jul | Aug | Sep | Oct | Nov | Dec | Year |
|---|---|---|---|---|---|---|---|---|---|---|---|---|---|
| Record high °C (°F) | 15.1 (59.2) | 17.7 (63.9) | 23.7 (74.7) | 28.5 (83.3) | 28.0 (82.4) | 30.4 (86.7) | 33.2 (91.8) | 31.5 (88.7) | 31.6 (88.9) | 26.5 (79.7) | 21.5 (70.7) | 15.3 (59.5) | 33.2 (91.8) |
| Mean daily maximum °C (°F) | 0.8 (33.4) | 3.1 (37.6) | 6.5 (43.7) | 11.4 (52.5) | 15.9 (60.6) | 20.7 (69.3) | 22.5 (72.5) | 22.9 (73.2) | 18.0 (64.4) | 12.5 (54.5) | 7.2 (45.0) | 2.4 (36.3) | 12.0 (53.6) |
| Daily mean °C (°F) | −2.8 (27.0) | −0.9 (30.4) | 2.0 (35.6) | 6.2 (43.2) | 10.6 (51.1) | 15.3 (59.5) | 17.0 (62.6) | 17.0 (62.6) | 12.8 (55.0) | 7.6 (45.7) | 3.4 (38.1) | −0.6 (30.9) | 7.3 (45.1) |
| Mean daily minimum °C (°F) | −6.4 (20.5) | −5.0 (23.0) | −2.6 (27.3) | 0.9 (33.6) | 5.4 (41.7) | 10.0 (50.0) | 11.4 (52.5) | 11.3 (52.3) | 7.5 (45.5) | 2.8 (37.0) | −0.4 (31.3) | −3.7 (25.3) | 2.6 (36.7) |
| Record low °C (°F) | −26.7 (−16.1) | −25.1 (−13.2) | −23.9 (−11.0) | −12.0 (10.4) | −5.6 (21.9) | −2.0 (28.4) | 2.0 (35.6) | 0.0 (32.0) | −6.1 (21.0) | −12.5 (9.5) | −18.2 (−0.8) | −22.0 (−7.6) | −26.7 (−16.1) |
| Average precipitation mm (inches) | 56.1 (2.21) | 42.5 (1.67) | 61.6 (2.43) | 71.9 (2.83) | 123.7 (4.87) | 136.2 (5.36) | 130.8 (5.15) | 77.4 (3.05) | 59.8 (2.35) | 71.0 (2.80) | 60.4 (2.38) | 51.4 (2.02) | 942.8 (37.12) |
| Average precipitation days (≥ 1.0 mm) | 9.7 | 8.2 | 9.3 | 10.3 | 13.2 | 13.0 | 14.5 | 7.5 | 7.2 | 7.4 | 8.6 | 9.3 | 118.2 |
| Average snowy days | 13.8 | 10.5 | 8.7 | 5.3 | 0.6 | 0 | 0 | 0 | 0 | 1.3 | 4.4 | 11.2 | 55.8 |
Source: Meteomanz (2014-2026); Infoclimat (1980-2010); ANM

== Tourism ==
The town of Predeal is a well-known tourist destination in Romania, especially in winter. It has five major ski runs, each with a difficulty grade. Most of them have snowmaking guns, and some are fitted with floodlights and ski lifts. The slopes range from 790 metres (2,590 ft) (Clăbucet variantă) to 2,243 metres (7,359 ft) (Cocoșul).

Some of the town's tourist attractions include the 3 Brazi Chalet, the Susai Chalet, and the Poiana Secuilor Chalet. In close proximity to Predeal are several tourist destinations, including the Peleș Castle, Râșnov Citadel, Bran Castle, the Old Town of Brașov, Biserica Neagră, and the Seven Ladders Canyon.

Historical population
| Year | Pop. | ±% |
|---|---|---|
| 1850 | 165 | — |
| 1930 | 2,113 | +1180.6% |
| 1941 | 2,764 | +30.8% |
| 1948 | 2,568 | −7.1% |
| 1956 | 5,121 | +99.4% |
| 1966 | 6,680 | +30.4% |
| 1977 | 7,273 | +8.9% |
| 1992 | 7,302 | +0.4% |
| 2002 | 5,615 | −23.1% |
| 2011 | 4,755 | −15.3% |
| 2021 | 4,020 | −15.5% |
Source: Census data

== Infrastructure ==
The town is crossed by two national roads (DN1 and DN73A) and one national railway (Căile Ferate Române Line 300, one of the main lines in Romania). Predeal is one of the cities which will be crossed by the future Bucharest – Brașov motorway.

== Gallery ==
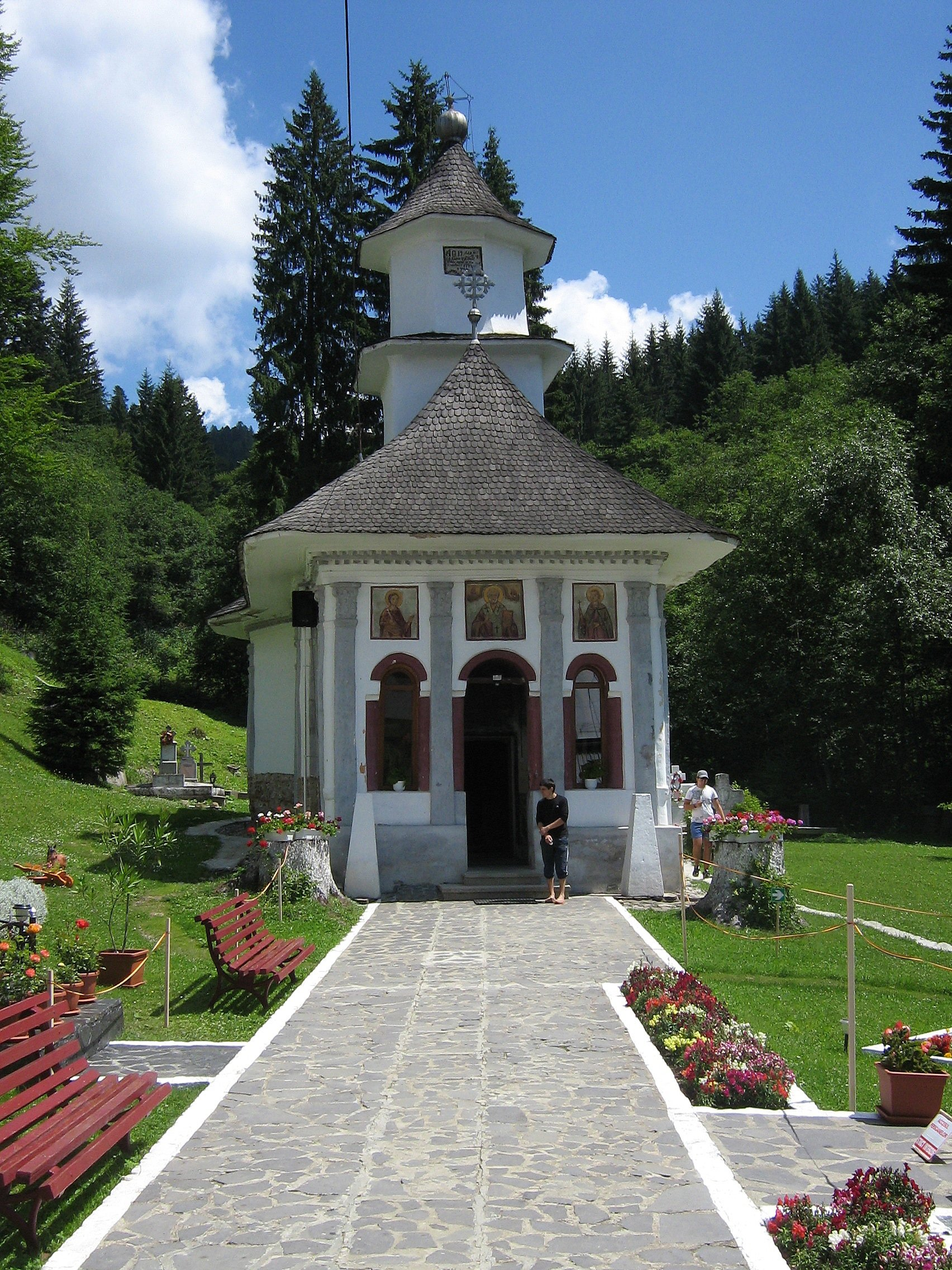
Predeal Monastery

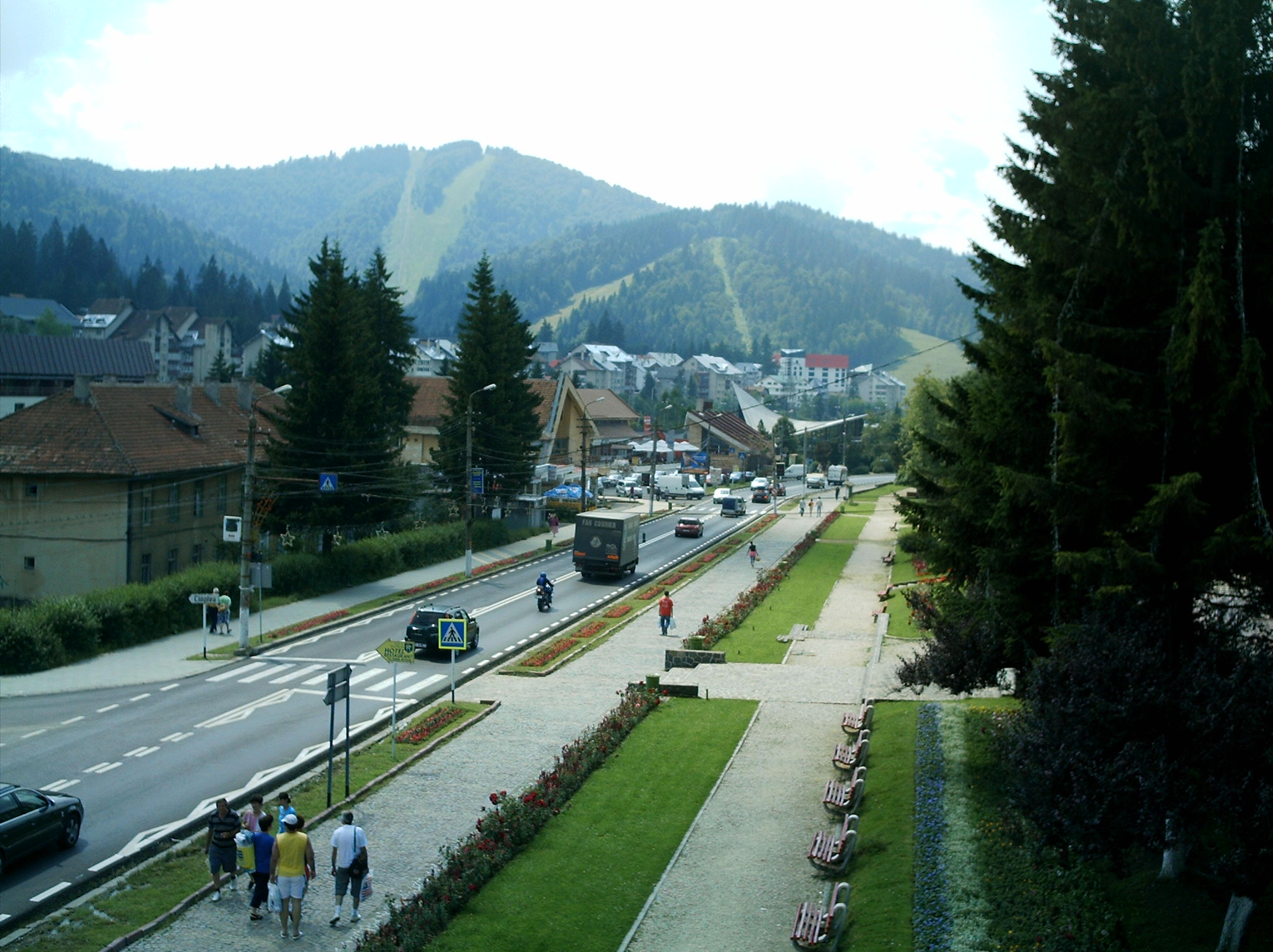
Street in Predeal

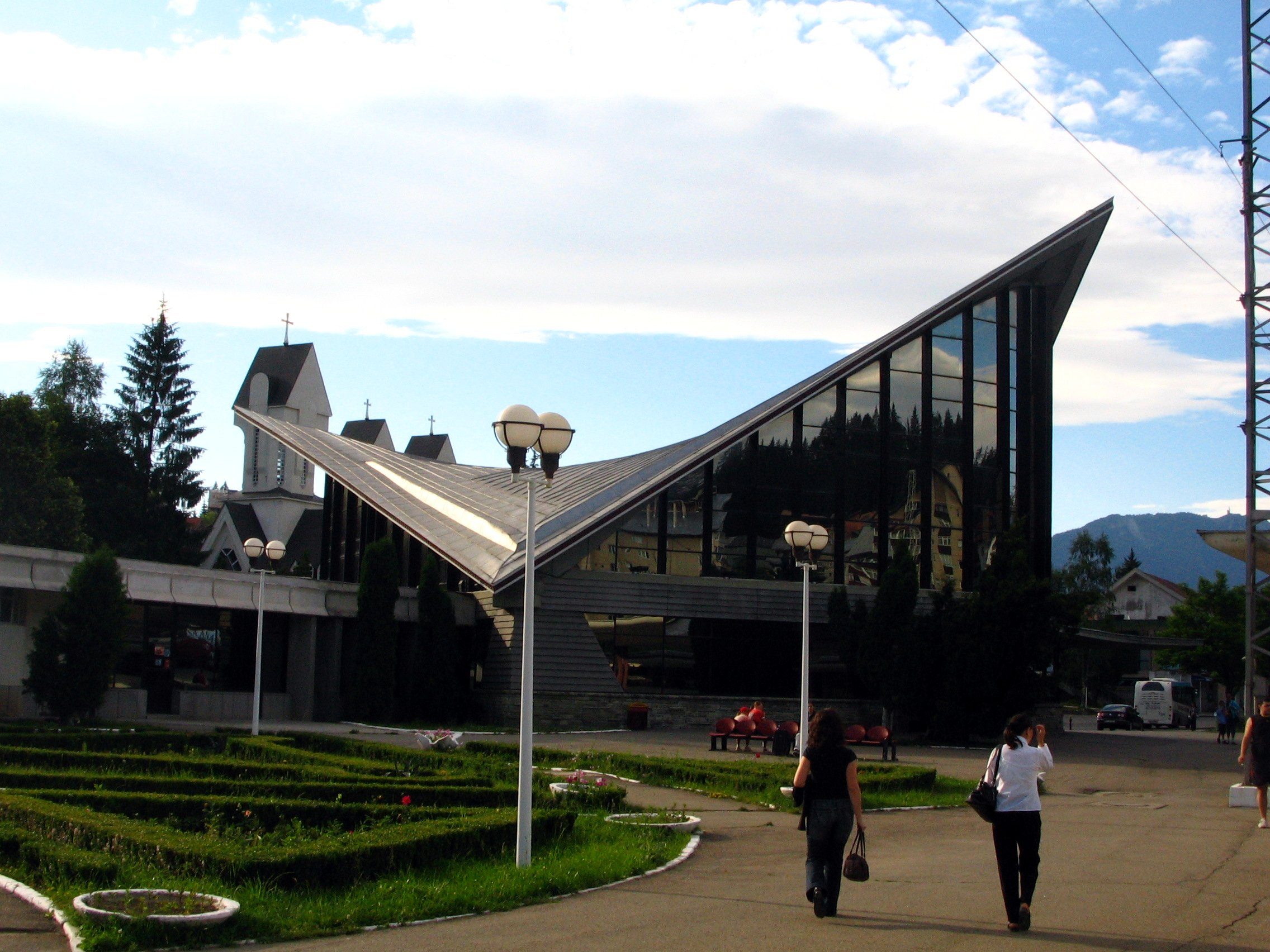
Predeal railway station

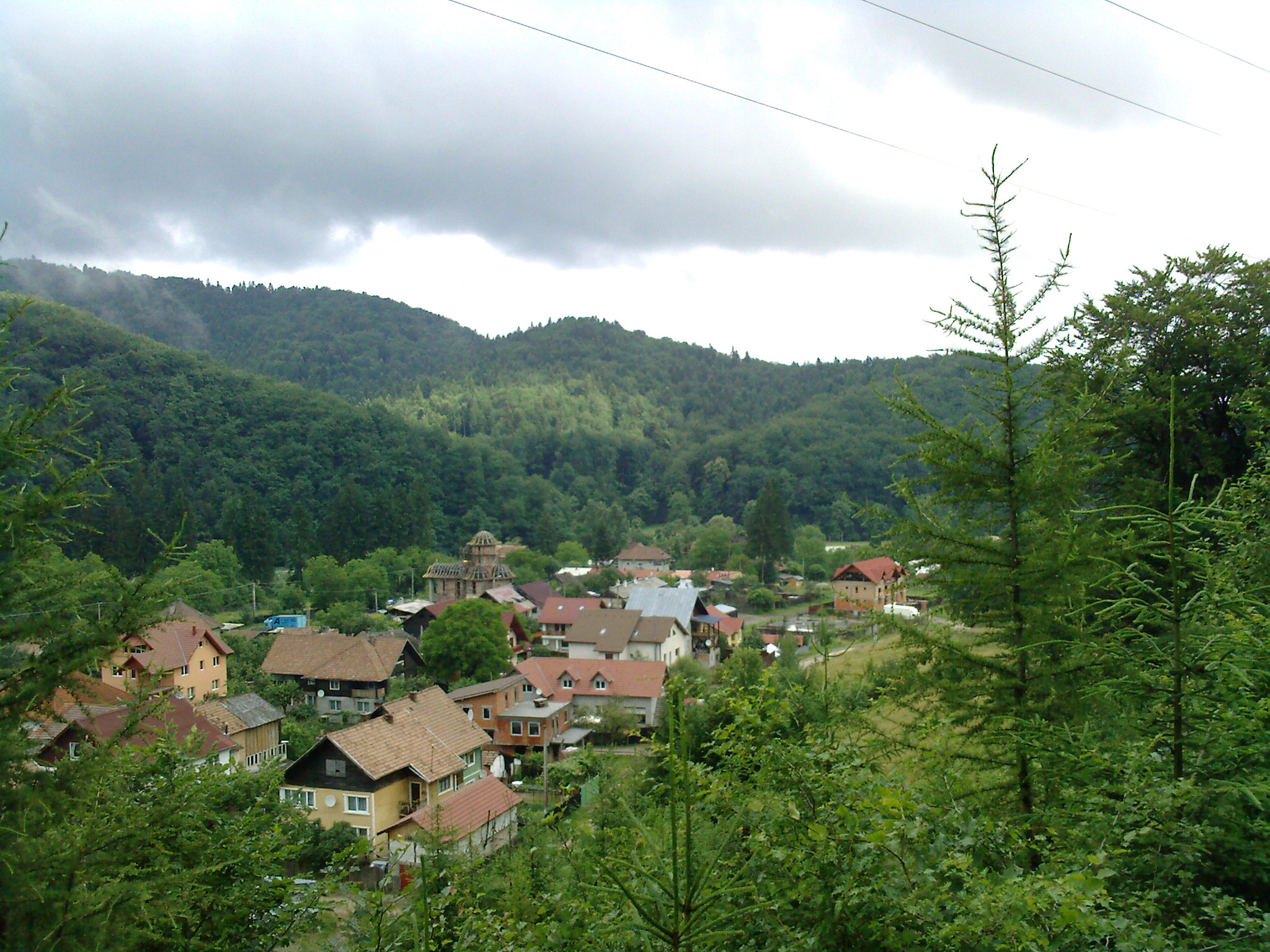
Timișu de Jos village
