= 2013 European Youth Olympic Winter Festival =

2013 edition of the European Youth Olympic Winter Festival

- Host city: Braşov
- Country: Romania
- Nations: 45
- Athletes: 1,465
- Sport: 8
- Events: 36
- Opening: 17 February 2013
- Closing: 22 February 2013
- Opened by: Victor Ponta
- Athlete's Oath: Daniela Haralambie
- Judge's Oath: Diana Cristina Bodi
- Coach's Oath: Ioan Poponeci
- Torch lighter: Mihai Covaliu
- Main venue: Ion Țiriac Arena

Summer

Winter

The 2013 European Youth Olympic Winter Festival was an international multi-sport event held between 17 and 22 February 2013, in Braşov, Romania, with some of the events also held in Râșnov, Predeal and Fundata. It was the 11th edition of the European Youth Olympic Winter Festival.

It was organized by the Romanian Olympic and Sports Committee (COSR), headed by Octavian Morariu. 1,465 athletes, aged between 14 and 18, from 45 nations participated in 36 events of eight disciplines. It was the first multi-sport competition hosted by Romania since the 1981 Summer Universiade that took place in Bucharest.

== Organization ==
=== Venues ===
Venue	Location	Sports
Brașov Olympic Ice Rink	Brașov	Ice hockey
Sub Teleferic, Poiana Brașov Ice Rink	Poiana Brașov	Alpine skiing, figure skating, short track speed skating
Valea Râşnoavei Sport Center	Predeal	Cross country skiing
Valea Cărbunării Ski Jumping Hill	Râșnov	Ski jumping
Cheile Grădiştei Arena	Fundata	Biathlon
Clăbucet Sosire (Arrival) Slope	Predeal	Snowboarding

The budget spent for the organization was €1.15 million, while for the construction of the venues came to a total cost of €60 million.

The Brașov Olympic Ice Rink raised to a cost of €11 million and was built entirely from public resources, being opened in May 2008. It hosted ice hockey.

The Ministry of Regional Development and Tourism of Romania spent €28 million on upgrading facilities at Poiana Brașov, which hosted the figure skating, alpine skiing and speed skating events, and €4 million at Predeal. The Râșnov Sports Complex, primarily financed through sponsorships, has also received ministry contribution. The three smaller hills were raised from non-government sources, but the K90 with money from the MDRT.

The Cheile Grădiştei Arena from Fundata belonged to a private investor, Ovidiu Gârbacea.

=== Volunteers ===
The organizing committee was supported by 480 volunteers, divided into several departments, after a selection which consisted in psycho-pedagogical interviews, foreign language knowledge and sportive abilities. Experience accumulated in organizing other events and volunteering activities was also taken into account.

They participated in all scheduled activities at the competition that were held from 17 to 22 February. Most volunteers worked a maximum of 10 hours per day. For this reason, volunteers took shifts in some of the activities. All volunteers were dressed in the same uniform, marked with the logos of the competition.

=== Marketing ===
==== Logo ====
The logo was designed in the shape of a snowflake in the five Olympic colors. The main idea behind it was that each snowflake is different from another, and while they are so fragile independently, they become together, similarly to how each athlete has their own strengths and qualities, and how team spirit makes them even greater.

Martin, the Carpathian Brown Bear, was official mascot of the competition

==== Mascot ====
The Carpathian Brown Bear Martin was the official mascot of the festival. Often present in Romanian culture, it inspired songs and tales, this type of bear being considered to be Romanian, due to its large presence in the Romanian Carpathian Mountains. Martin was dressed in red, yellow and blue, representing the colors of the Romanian national flag.

=== Medals ===
The medals were produced by a company in Bucharest that has an experience of over 20 years in the field. They were cast in gold, silver and bronze and attached to a multicolor cord having the colors of the Olympic circles.

=== Applications for IPhone and IPad ===
Free applications for IPhone, IPad, tablets and smartphones were launched on February 15, also available on iTunes and Google Play. The application contained the schedule of the competition, information about the organizers and sponsors. During the competition, the sport results were updated in 30 minutes after the end of the races.

=== Official stores ===
In each location where the festival competitions took place, there was a store with promotional items and souvenirs, such as miniature mascots, magnets, pins, inscribed mugs, etc.

=== Media coverage ===
The host broadcaster was the Romanian Television (TVR). It used its own cameras and crews.

== Calendar ==
●	Opening ceremony	Event competitions	●	Event finals	●	Closing ceremony

February 2013	17th Sun	18th Mon	19th Tue	20th Wed	21st Thu	22nd Fri	Gold Medals
Ceremonies	●					●	
Alpine skiing		●	●	●	●	●	5
Biathlon			●●		●●	●	5
Cross country skiing		●●	●●		●●	●	7
Figure skating					●	●	2
Ice hockey						●	1
Short track	●●	●●	●●●				7
Ski jumping		●	●	●	●	●	5
Snowboarding			●●		●●		4
Total Gold Medals	2	6	11	2	9	6	36
Cumulative Total	2	8	19	21	30	36	

== Festival ==
=== Opening ceremony ===
The event was officially opened by Prime Minister Victor Ponta, who was accompanied by the Mayor of Braşov George Scripcaru and the International Olympic Committee President Jacques Rogge. Approximately 3,000 spectators attended the opening ceremony, which was held outdoors on the Ion Țiriac Arena of the Sports High School, at the foothill of the Tâmpa Mountain. The Olympic torch was carried into the arena by Rareș Dumitrescu and Mihai Covaliu. The latter had the mission to carry the Olympic flame in the last part of the route and to light the torch. The olympic oath followed, uttered by athletes, referees and trainers.

=== Sports ===
2013 European Youth Olympic Winter Festival Sports Programme
- Alpine skiing (5)
- Biathlon (5)
- Cross-country skiing (7)
- Figure skating (2)
- Ice hockey (1)
- Short track speed skating (7)
- Ski jumping (5)
- Snowboarding (4)

=== Participating nations ===
Participating National Olympic Committees
- Albania
- Andorra
- Armenia
- Austria
- Belarus
- Belgium
- (Bosnia and Herzegovina) Bosnia Herzegovina
- Bulgaria
- Croatia
- Cyprus
- Czech Republic (64)
- Denmark
- Estonia (16)
- Finland
- France
- (Georgia (country)) Georgia
- Germany
- (United Kingdom) Great Britain (10)
- Greece
- Hungary
- Iceland
- (Republic of Ireland) Ireland
- Italy
- Latvia
- Liechtenstein
- Lithuania (14)
- Luxembourg
- (North Macedonia) Macedonia
- Moldova
- Monaco
- Montenegro
- Netherlands
- Norway
- Poland
- Romania (60)
- Russia (67)
- San Marino
- Serbia (5)
- Slovakia
- Slovenia
- Spain
- Sweden
- Switzerland
- Turkey
- Ukraine

== Medal table ==
* Host nation (Romania)

Rank	Nation	Gold	Silver	Bronze	Total
1	Russia (RUS)	11	7	4	22
2	Germany (GER)	6	7	3	16
3	France (FRA)	4	3	5	12
4	Slovenia (SLO)	3	3	4	10
5	Austria (AUT)	2	4	6	12
6	Italy (ITA)	2	4	2	8
7	Norway (NOR)	2	2	2	6
8	Romania (ROU)*	1	2	0	3
9	Poland (POL)	1	1	2	4
10	Ukraine (UKR)	1	1	1	3
11	Switzerland (SUI)	1	0	3	4
12	Finland (FIN)	1	0	1	2
13	Czech Republic (CZE)	1	0	0	1
14	Great Britain (GBR)	0	1	0	1
14	Lithuania (LTU)	0	1	0	1
16	Belarus (BLR)	0	0	1	1
16	Estonia (EST)	0	0	1	1
16	Netherlands (NED)	0	0	1	1
Totals (18 entries)		36	36	36	108
