= Râșnov Fortress =

Medieval castle in Romania

- Romanian: Cetatea Râșnov; German: Rosenauer Burg; Hungarian: Barcarozsnyó vára
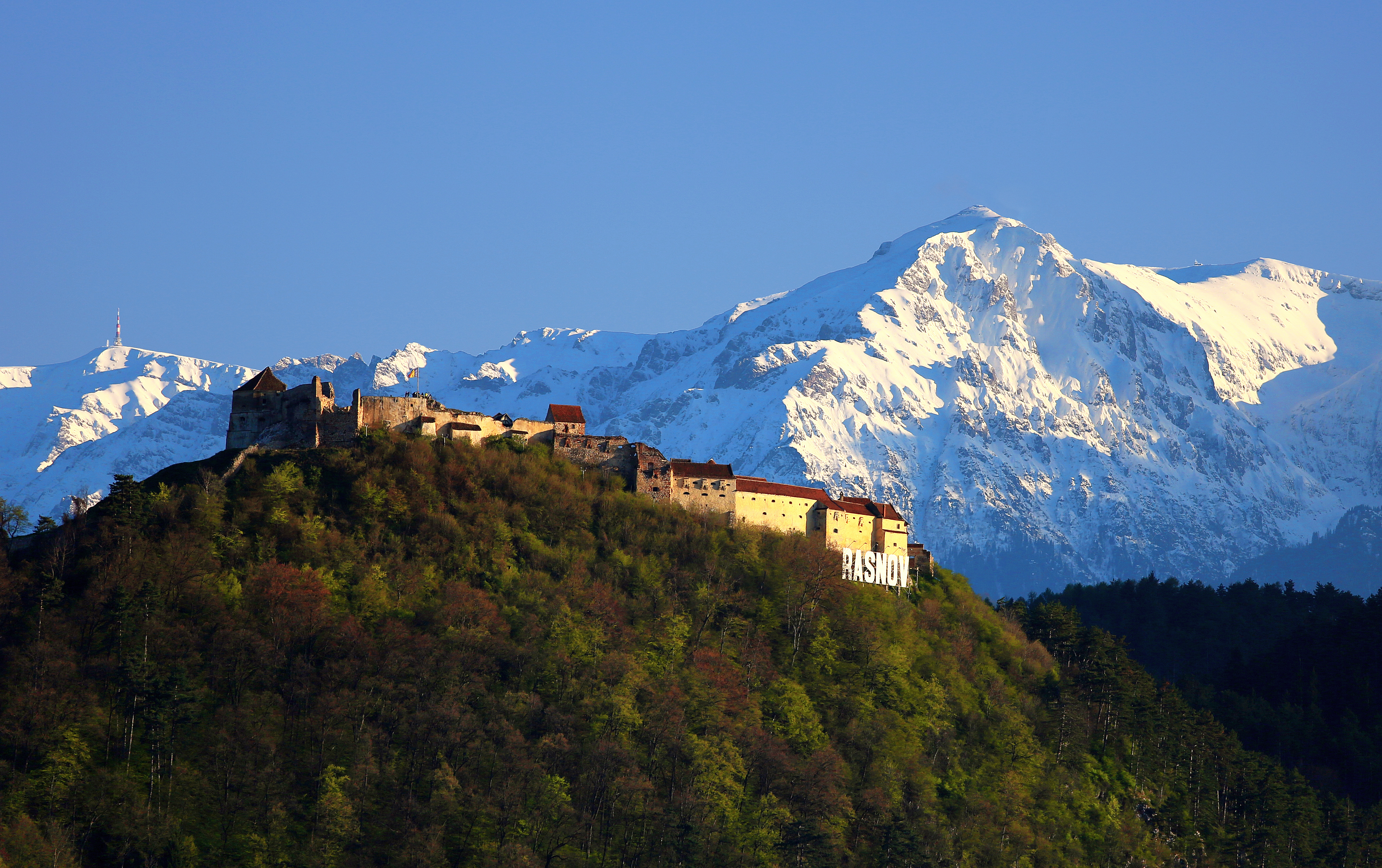

- Location within Romania
- Former names: Cetatea Țărănească

General information
- Location: Râșnov; Brașov County, Romania
- Coordinates: 45°35′26″N 25°28′8″E
- Construction started: 1211
- Completed: 1225
- Renovated: 2010

Râșnov Fortress (Romanian: Cetatea Râșnov pronunciation: [ˈrɨʃnov], German: Rosenauer Burg, Hungarian: Barcarozsnyó vára) is a medieval Fliehburg-type fortress, which offered refuge for townspeople and villagers from the area in times of war. It is situated in Râșnov, Brașov County, not far from Brașov.

Built as part of a defence system for the Transylvanian villages exposed to outside invasions, the fortress was historically garrisoned by both the local Romanian and Saxon communities, with each providing an equal number of men. A decisive aspect for building the fortress at its location was the route of the invading armies which were coming from the Bran Pass and were passing through Râșnov, on their way to Brașov and other parts of the Burzenland region. The only chance of survival for the inhabitants of the area, including from Cristian and Ghimbav, was the refuge inside the fortress at Râșnov. Compelled to stay there for decades, the people of Râșnov and the nearby villages turned the fortification into their long-term place of residence.

== History ==
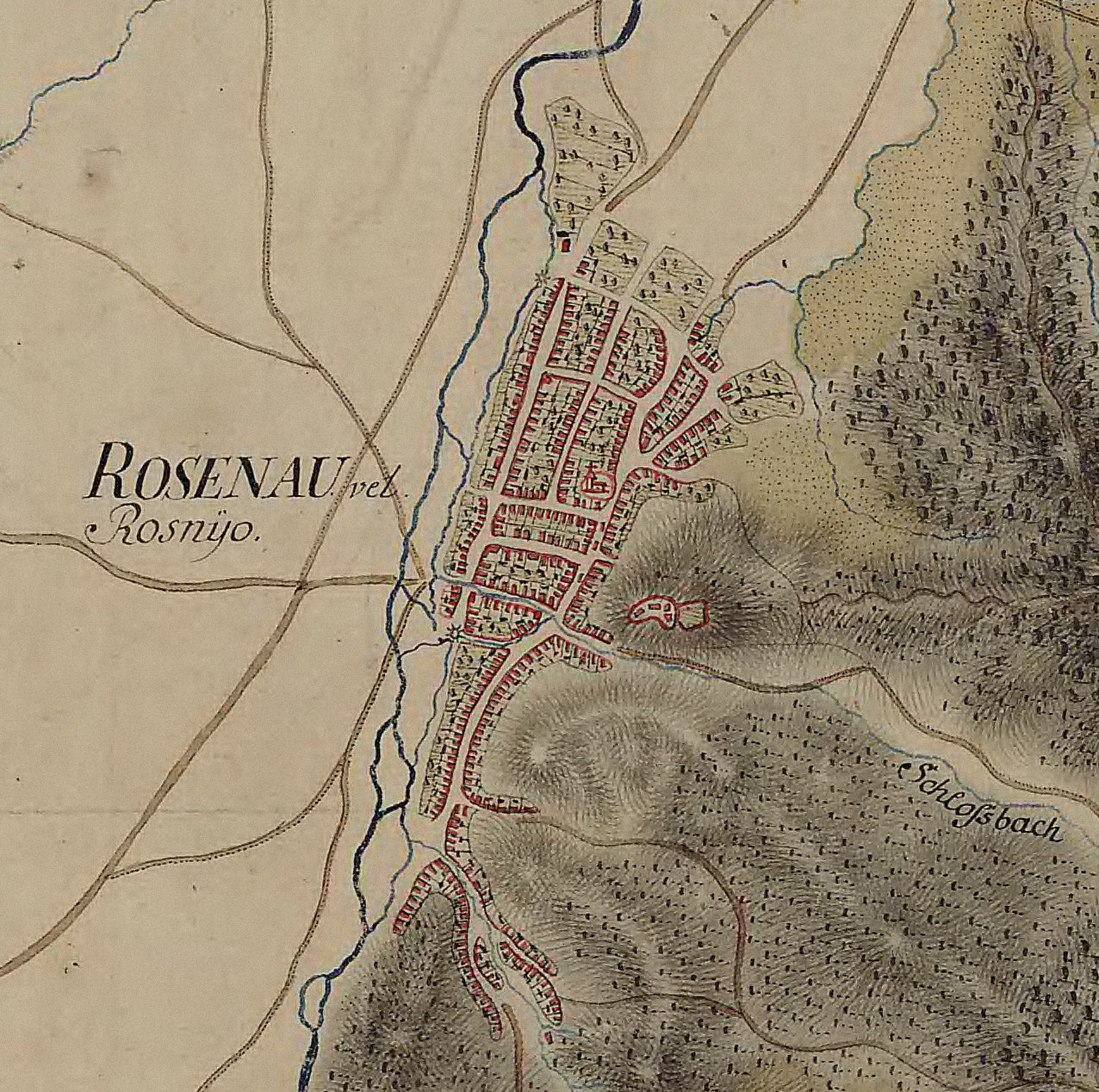
Râșnov town and fortress on the Josephine Map of Transylvania (c. 1770)

Archaeological research revealed the existence of fortification traces on the fortress hill since prehistoric and Dacian times.

The initial medieval fortress is considered to have been built between 1211 and 1225, in the Kingdom of Hungary during the local rule of the Teutonic Knights in Burzenland, although there is no archaeological evidence in this respect.

In 1335, during a Tatar incursion that ravaged the Burzenland, Râșnov and Brașovia were the only fortified places that remained unconquered. This is also the first documented attestation of the fortification.

In 1421, the fortress was besieged for the first time by an Ottoman army.

In 1600, Michael the Brave along with his troops and his wife, Lady Stanca, retreated here after their defeat at the Battle of Mirăslău.

In 1612, during the rule of Prince Gabriel Báthory, the fortress was conquered for the only time in its history. It fell due to the lack of water caused by the discovery by the enemy troops of the path leading to a secret spring.

To remove the weakness constituted by the lack of a source of water inside the fortress, a 146 metres (479 ft) deep well was dug out between 1623 and 1642.

In 1718, the fortress was partially destroyed by a fire, and in 1802, it was damaged by an earthquake.

In 1821, refugees from Wallachia (the resurgent movement led by Tudor Vladimirescu) retreated to the fortress.

Between 1848 and 1849, because the town of Râșnov lay on the way of both the Hungarian revolutionaries and the Austrian imperial troops, the inhabitants retreated to the fortress. This was the last mission of the fortress as a place of refuge and defence.

In 1850, due to the political situation and the diminution of the fortress's defensive role, the fortification was abandoned, becoming a ruin. There was only one guard left who had to announce the outbreak of fires by tolling a bell.

After World War II and the takeover of the communist regime in Romania, the fortress was restored for the first time, but barely, in the years 1955–1956.

In 2000–2007, an Italian entrepreneur has transformed the decaying ruins into a picturesque tourist attraction by destroying and arbitrarily rebuilding parts of the archaeological remains. The Râșnov municipality has recovered the property in 2008 and better supervised work has ensued.

=== The legend of the well ===
The absence of an internal water source led to the limitation of long-term resistance during sieges. Because of this lack, it was decided to start the digging of a well in the rocky soil, in 1623.

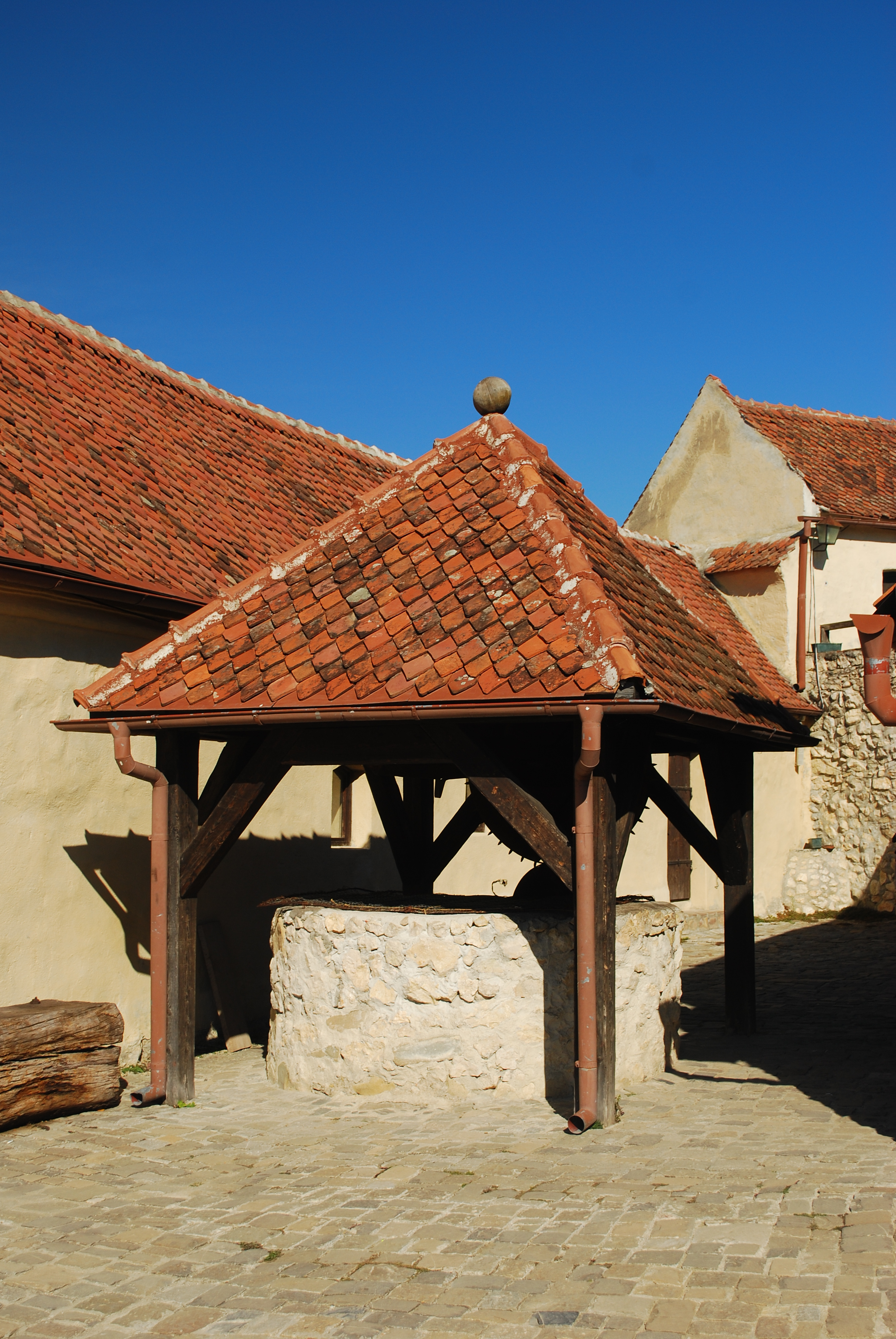
The legendary well

The legend says that during a siege, the inhabitants of the fortress made two Turkish prisoners dig a well in the middle of the fortress in order to regain their freedom. The captives dug for 17 years, during which time they wrote verses from Koran on the well walls which can be seen even today. The fate of the prisoners isn't known, with some saying that they were released, and others that they were killed.

The well was used until 1850 when a broken wheel in the well windlass caused its abandonment.

The elders of Râșnov believe that deep in the well lies a treasure at least 300 years old. However, recently alpinists have closely explored the well, without finding any trace of it.

== Architecture ==
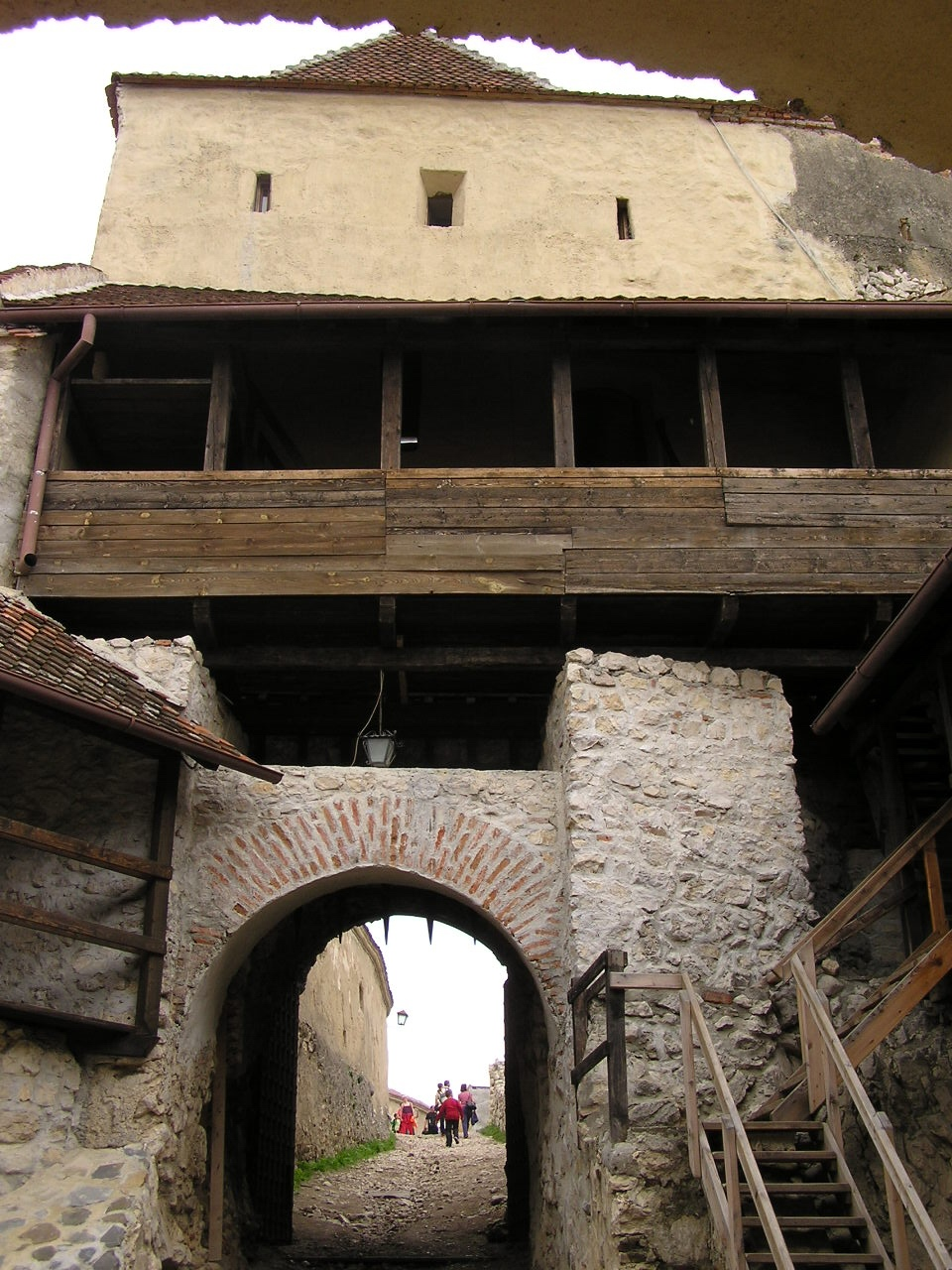
Southern inner gate

The fortress has a simple architectural style, similar to the ordinary houses of the time and adapted to the fortification requirements. The builders used stone and bricks for building the walls, and wood for making the gates and platforms. The towers and walls are covered with roof tiles for preventing the fires from besiegers. The walls are 5 metres (16 ft) high and the widest part is constituted by the South wall which in some areas is 1.5 metres (4.9 ft) thick.

The fortress is composed of two courts. The exterior court is located in front of the eastern wall, edged by a fortified wall, and fitted with a square tower. The interior court represents the inhabitable area, having a better protection by walls and towers.

From south, west and north the fortress is protected by sharp cliffs of about 150 metres (490 ft), very hard to climb. The whole superior area is defended by exterior towers gathered in the northern flank and western corner. Because of its U-shape, the eastern side of the fortress was more vulnerable due to less natural obstacles. To boost its defensive capacity, the fortress holds in this sector the heaviest fortifications.

The eastern, western and northern sides are protected by a continuous gallery with two ante forts and seven towers. There are only two towers on the southern side which is more abrupt.

The interior courtyard is paved with narrow paths made of stone, which ribbon among the tile-roofed houses. Inside there have been conserved the ruins of a school, a chapel, and over thirty houses fated to refuge the villagers and their assets.

== The feudal art museum ==
Inside the fortress there is a museum which briefly presents elements of local history, the area's habits and crafts, and also gathers artifacts and weapons from the inhabitants' past. It contains the following sections: document photocopies, weapons, tools, stamps and period objects.

== Image gallery ==
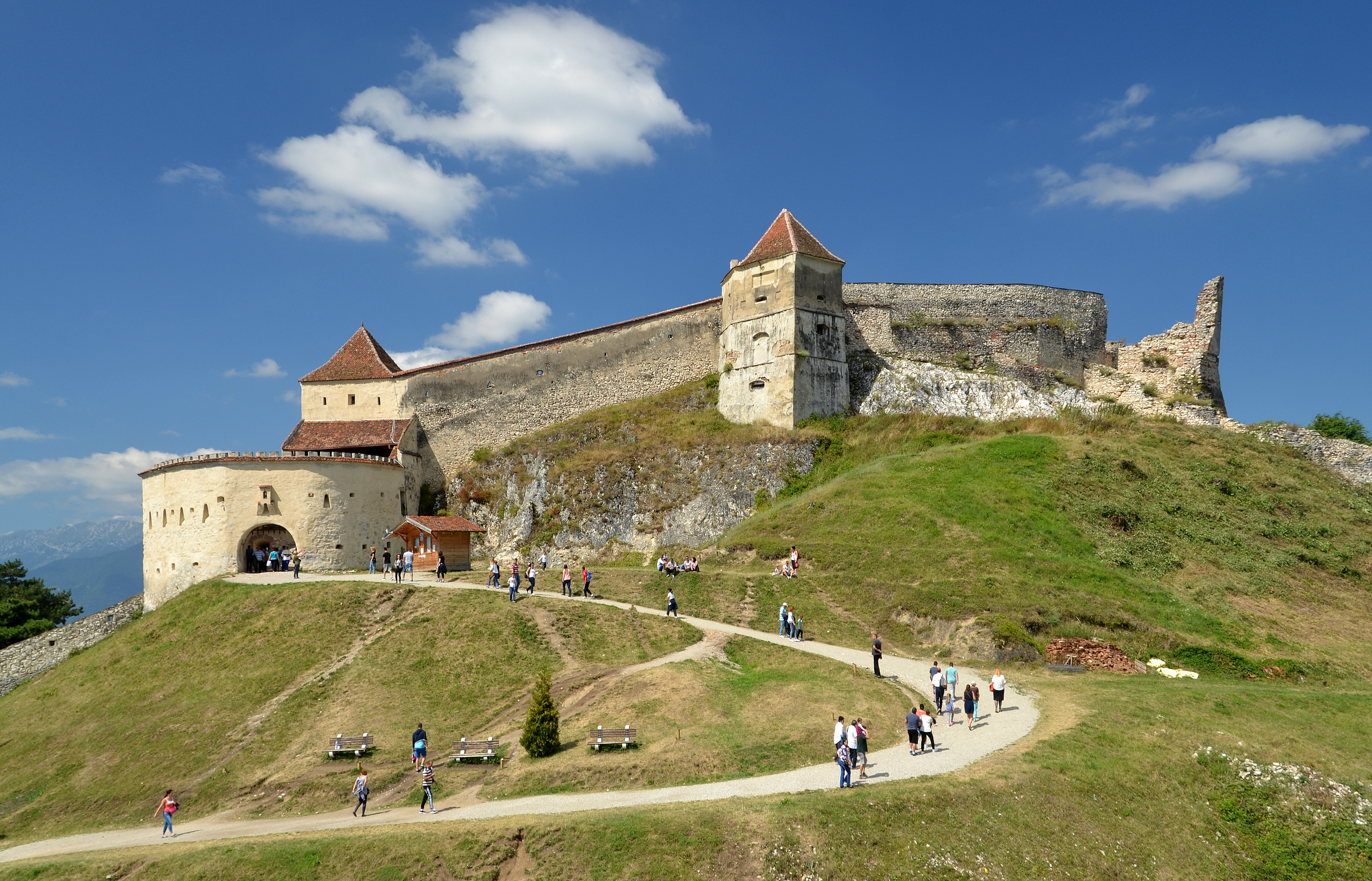
Râșnov Fortress

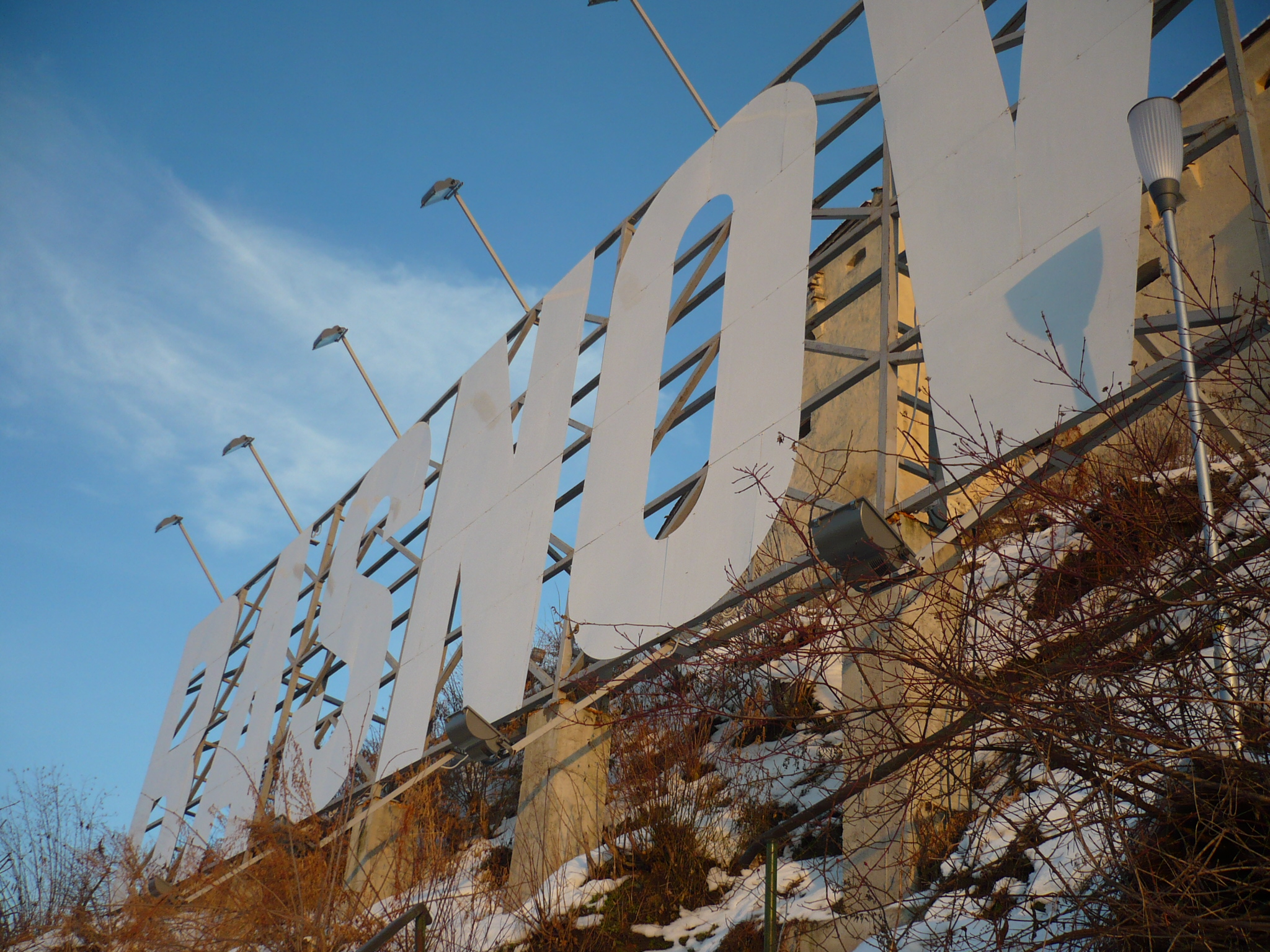
Râșnov sign outside the walls

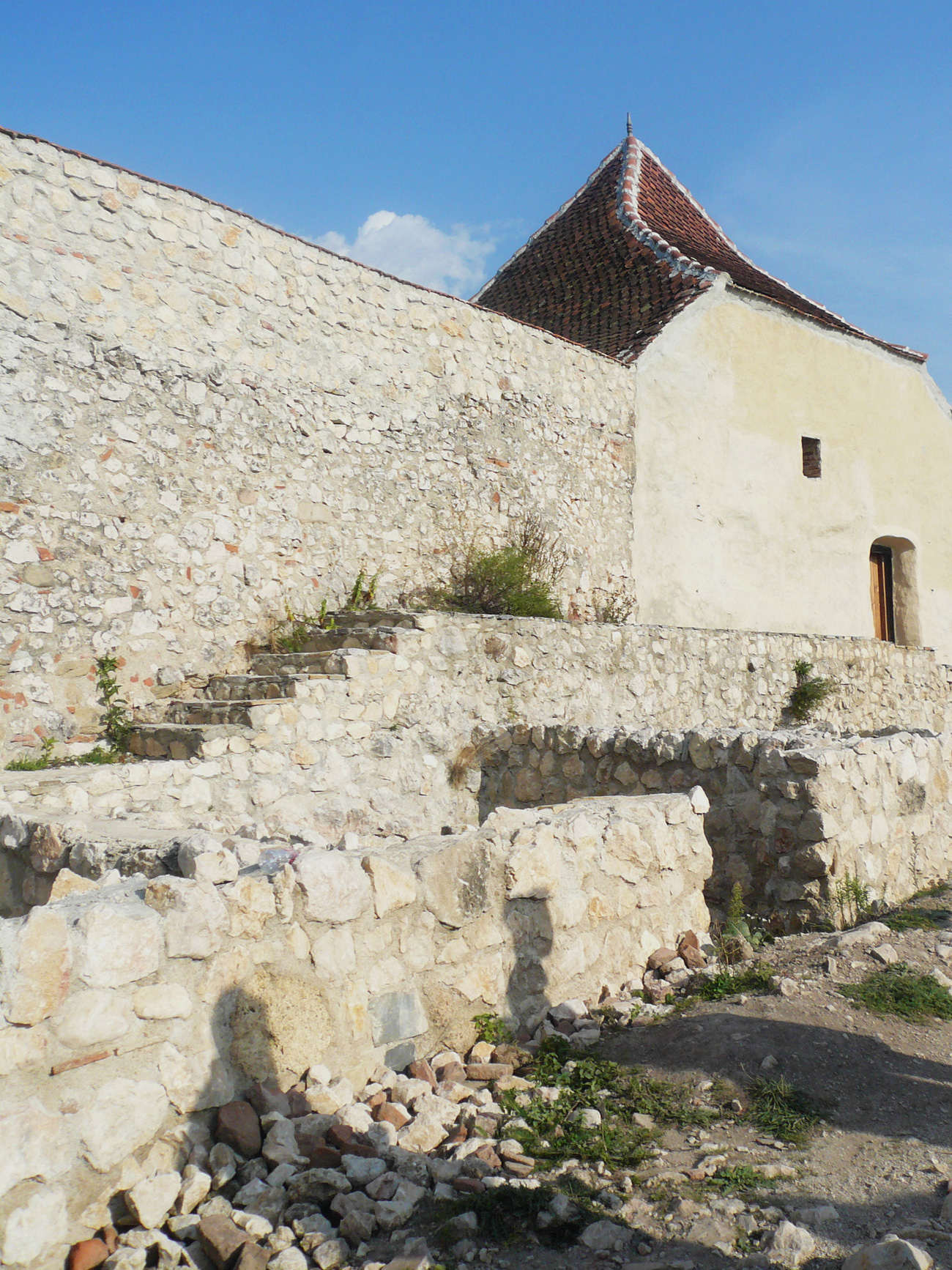
Wall & tower (inside view)

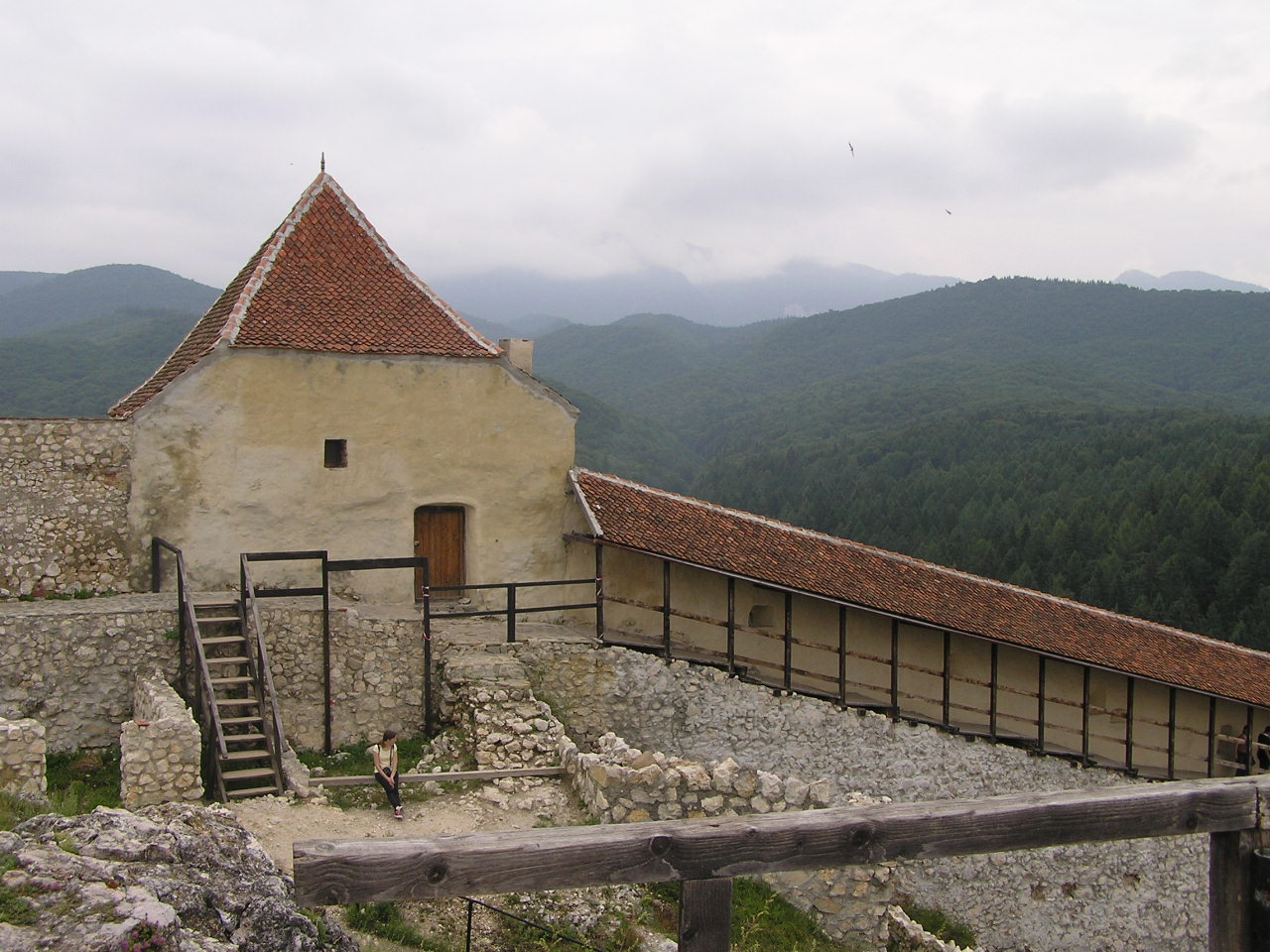
Wall & tower (inside view)

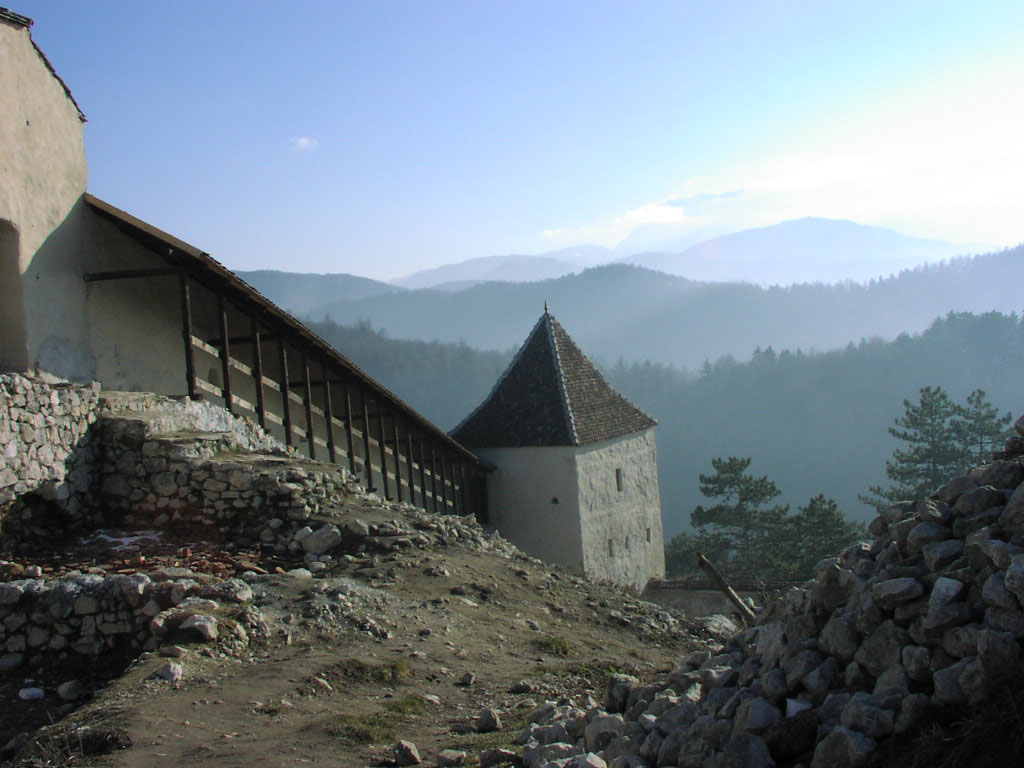
Wall & tower (inside view)

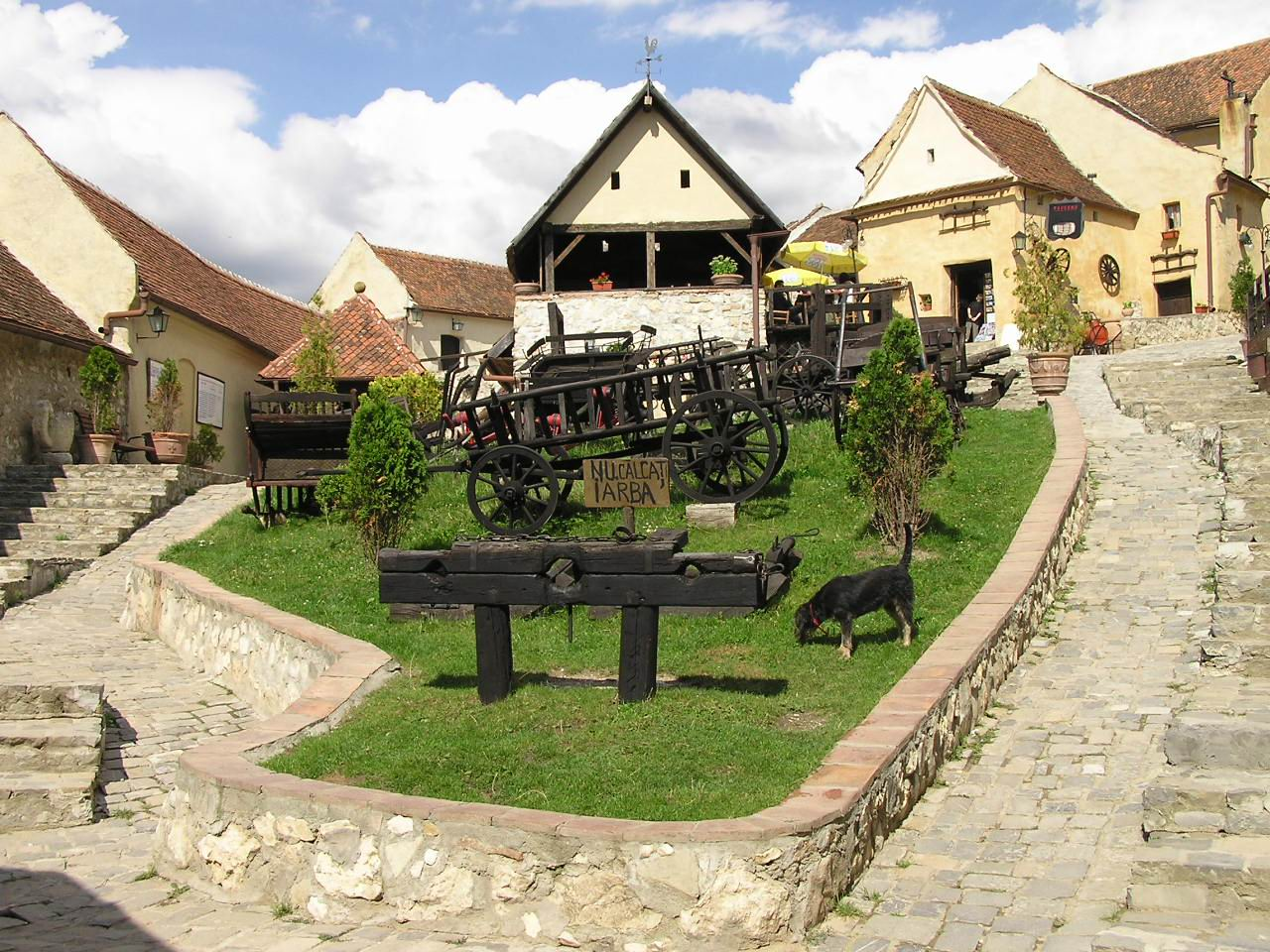
Inner courtyard

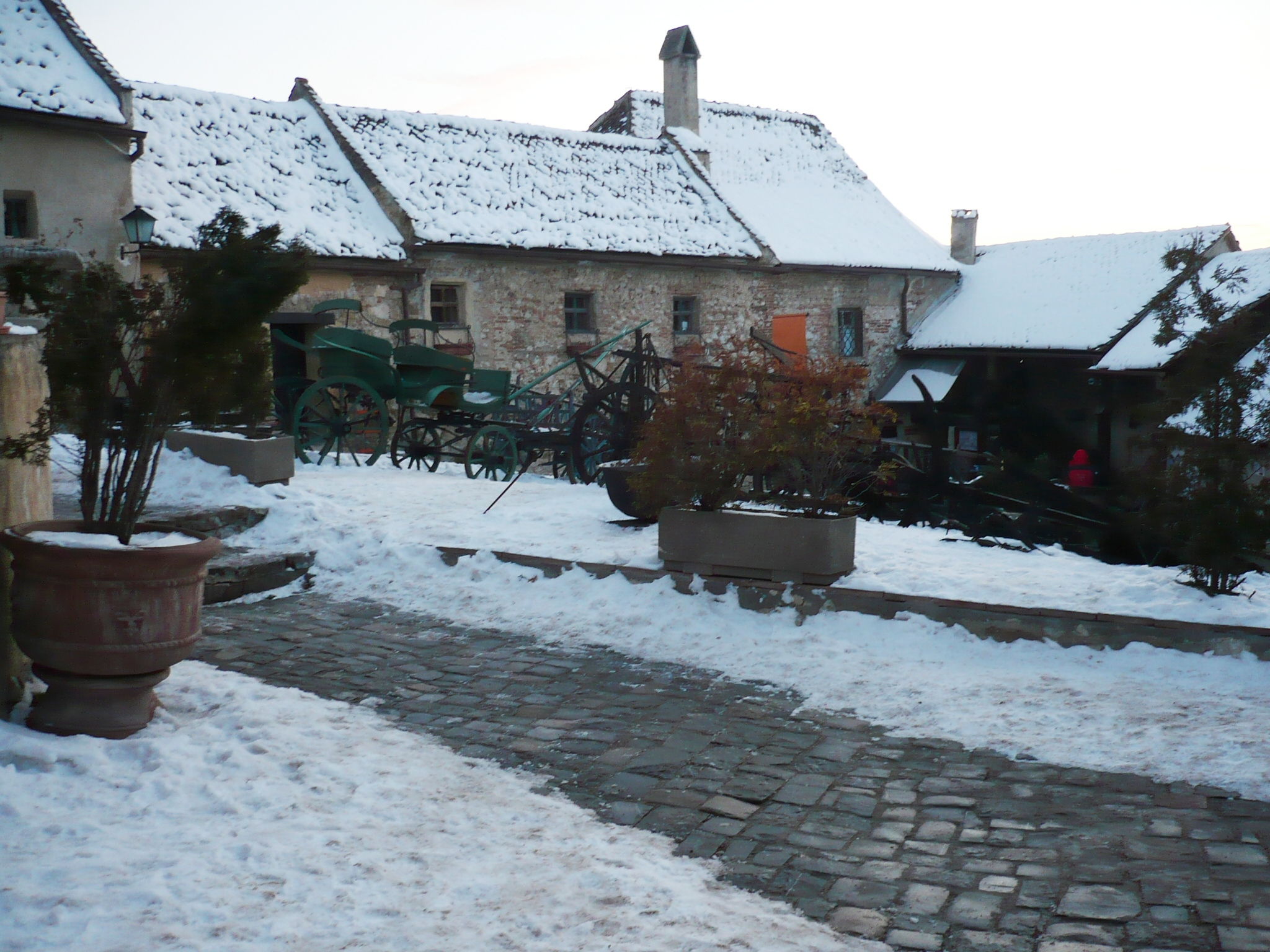
Houses inside the fortress

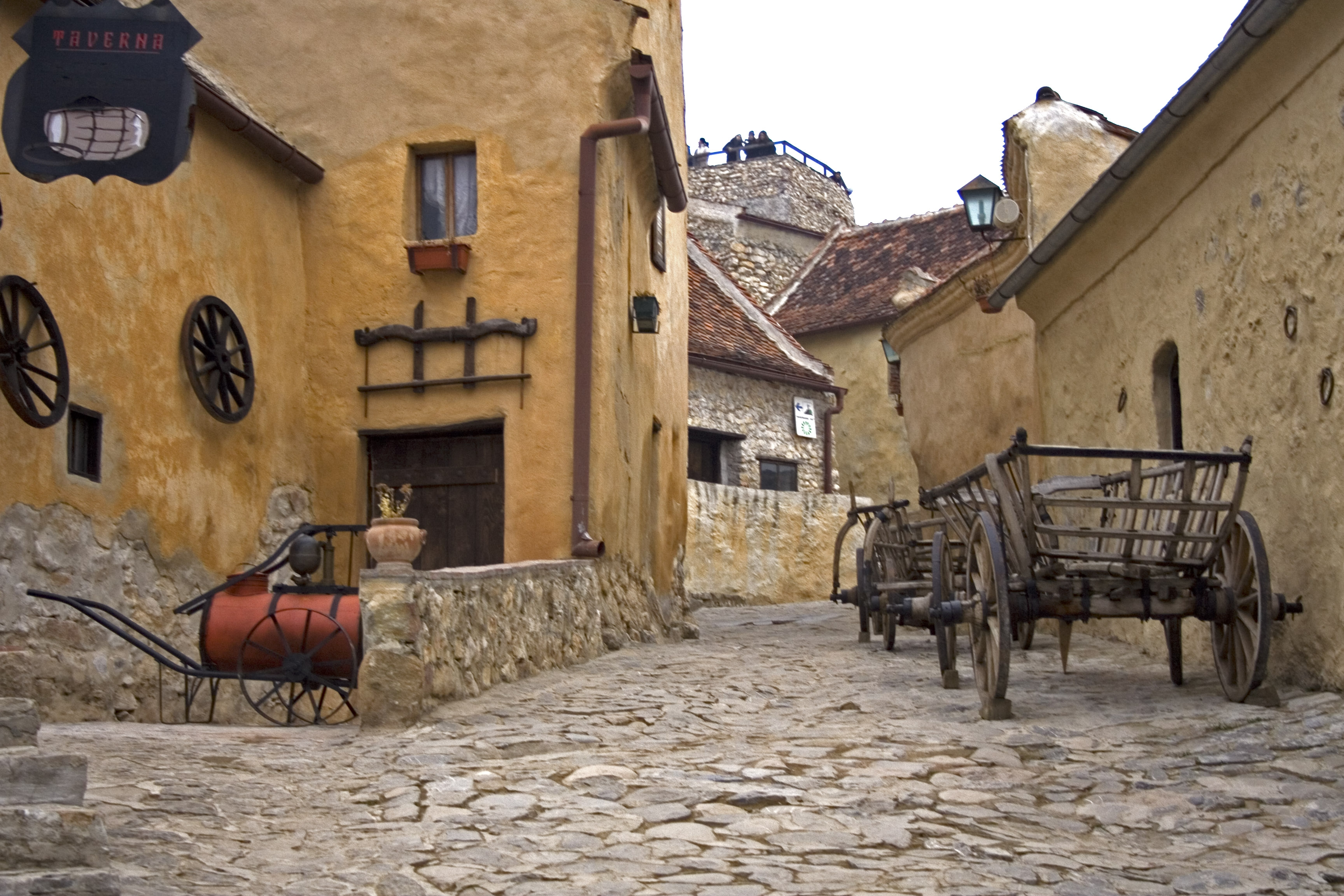
Reconstructed lane

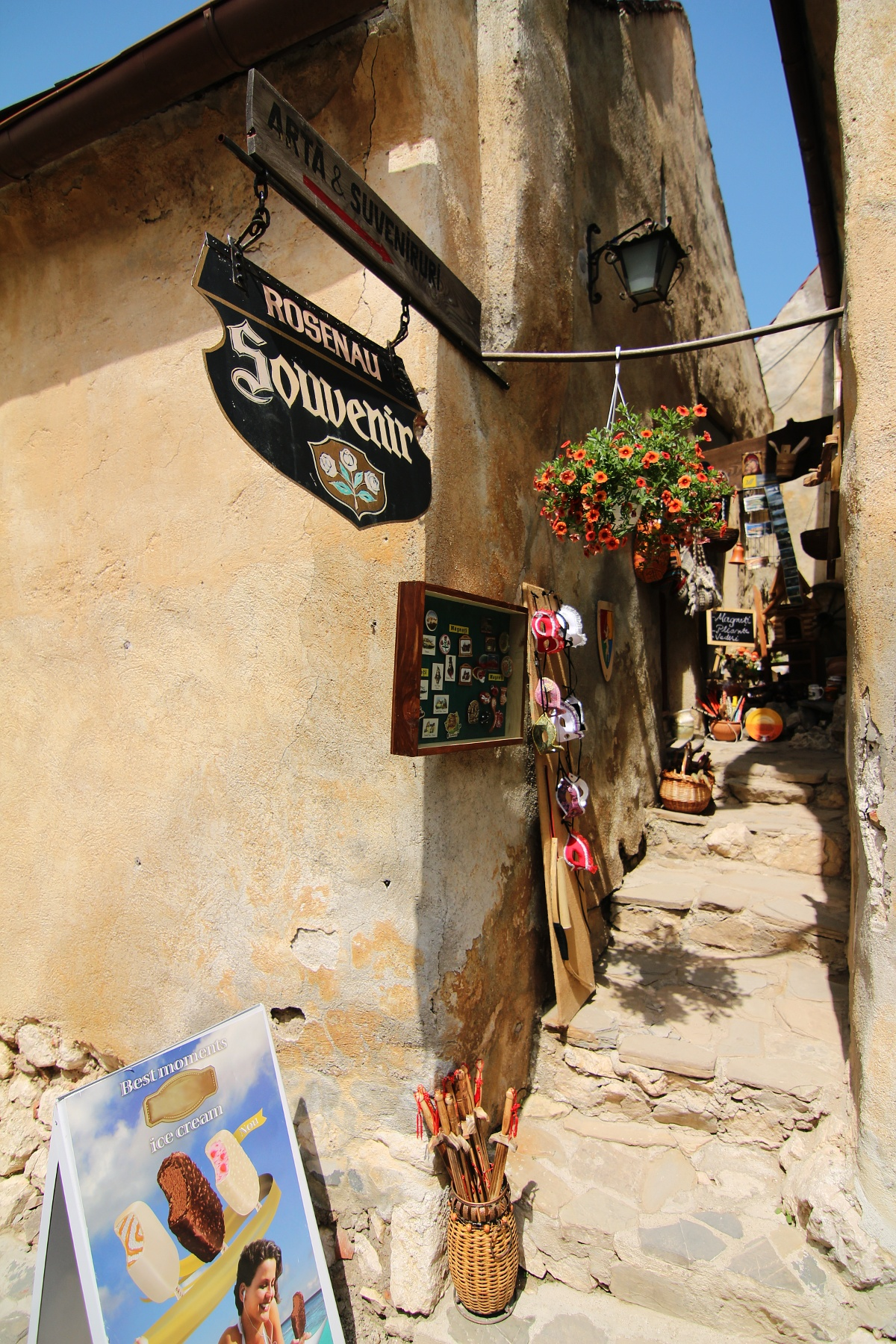
Narrow lane

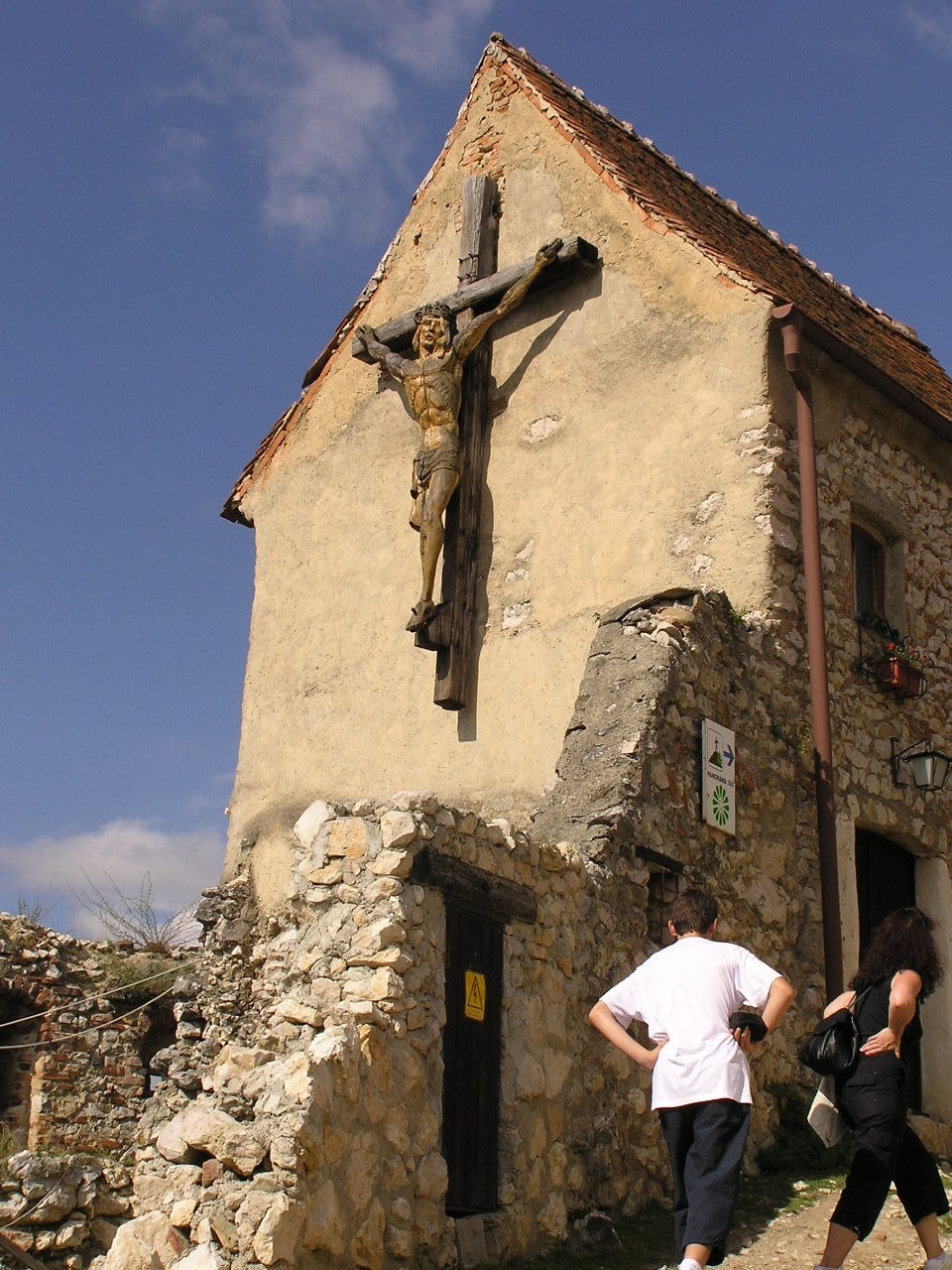
Crucifix

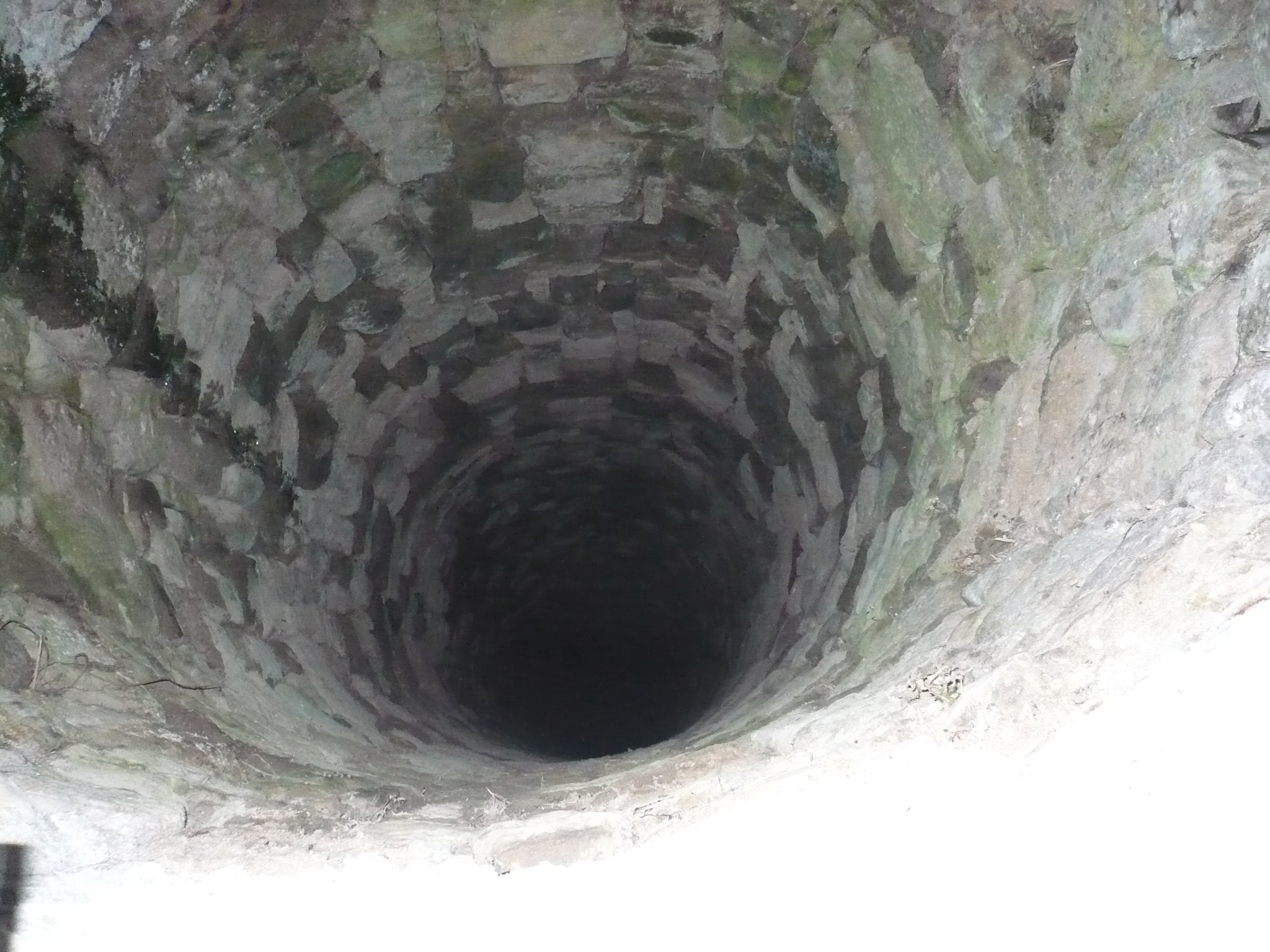
Well shaft

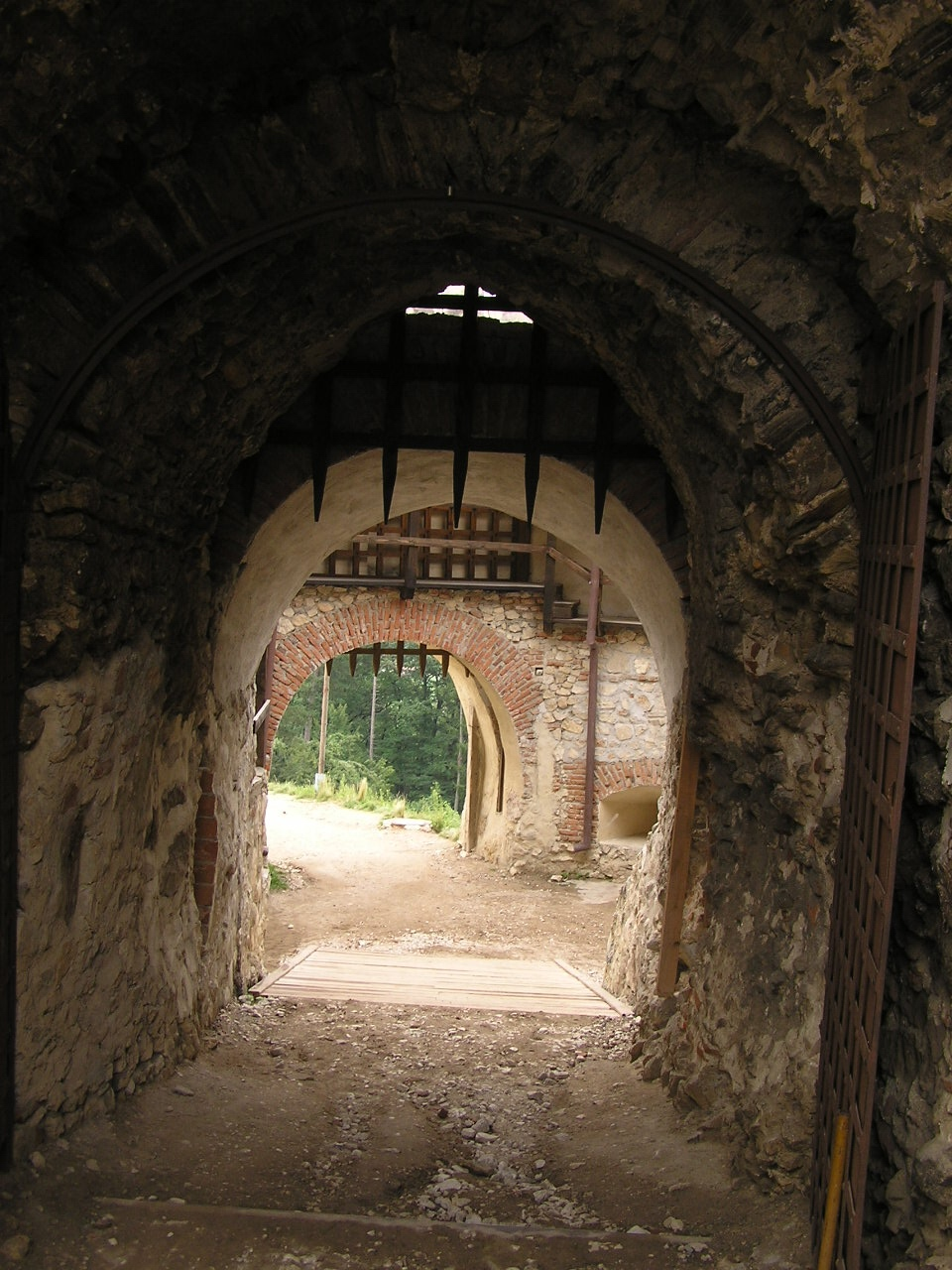
Eastern gate (inside view)

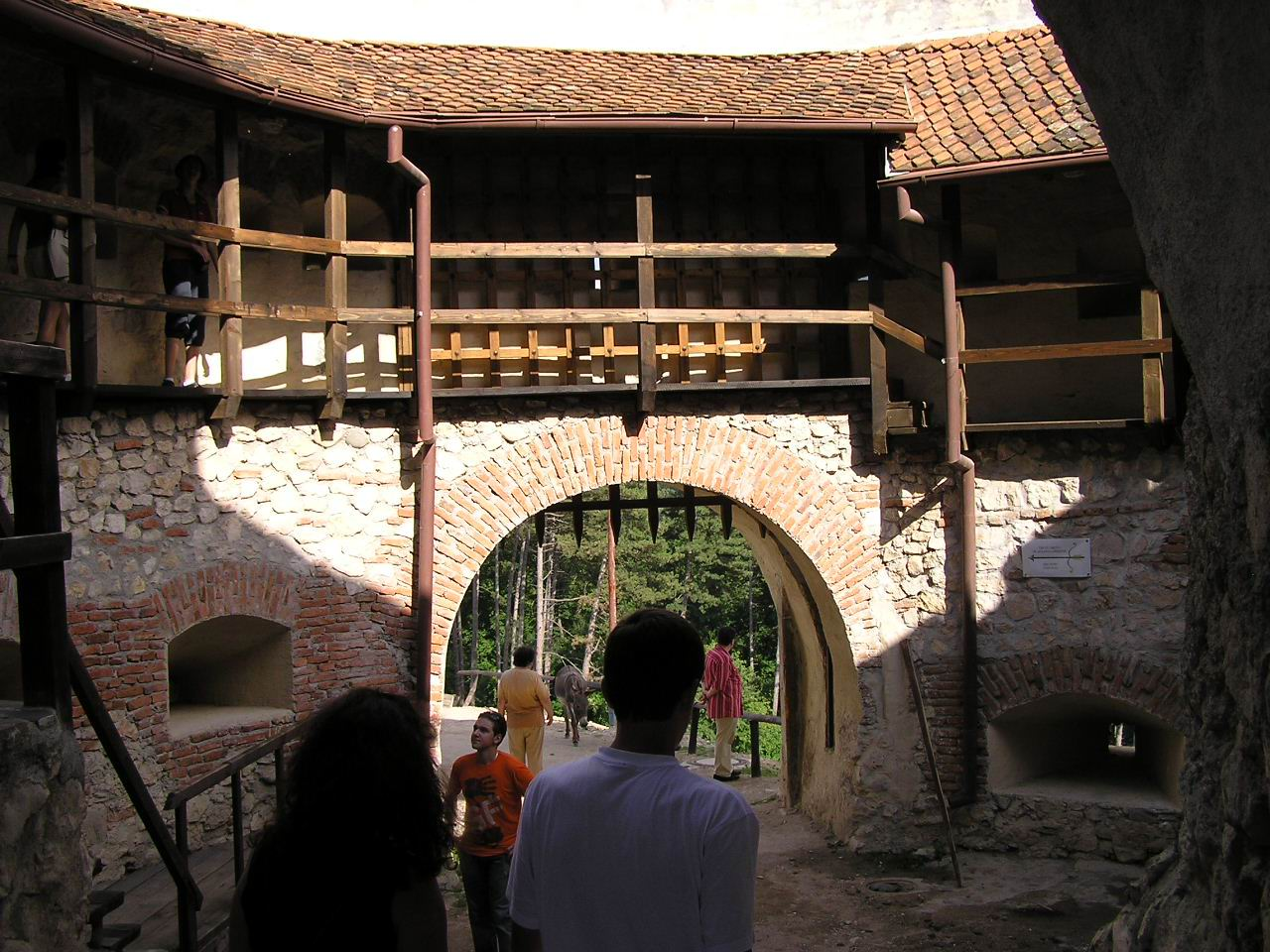
Eastern gate (inside view)

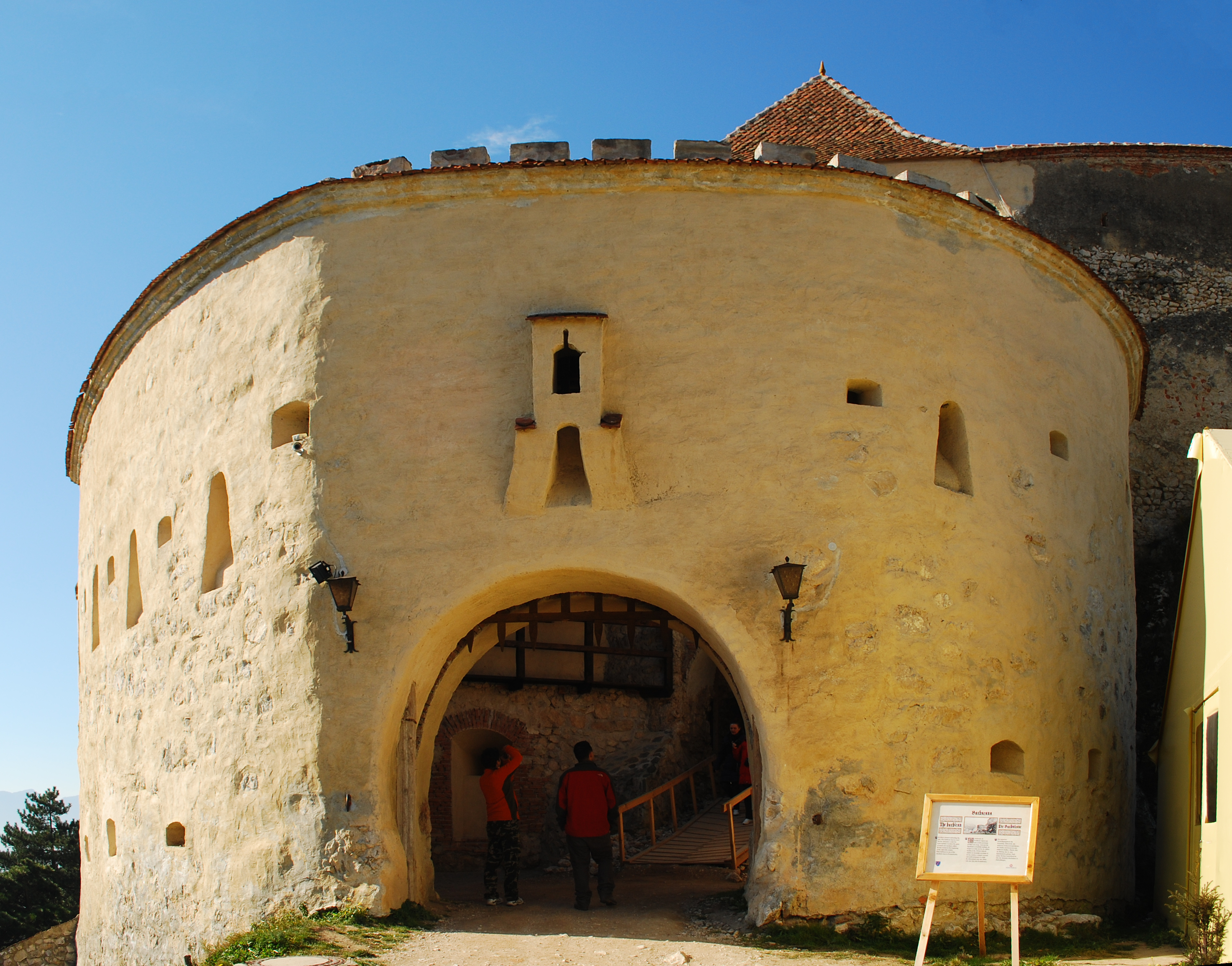
Eastern gate (outside view)

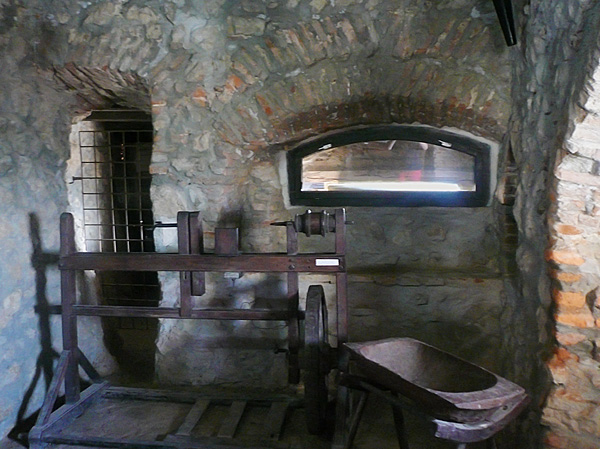
Museum: lathe, trough

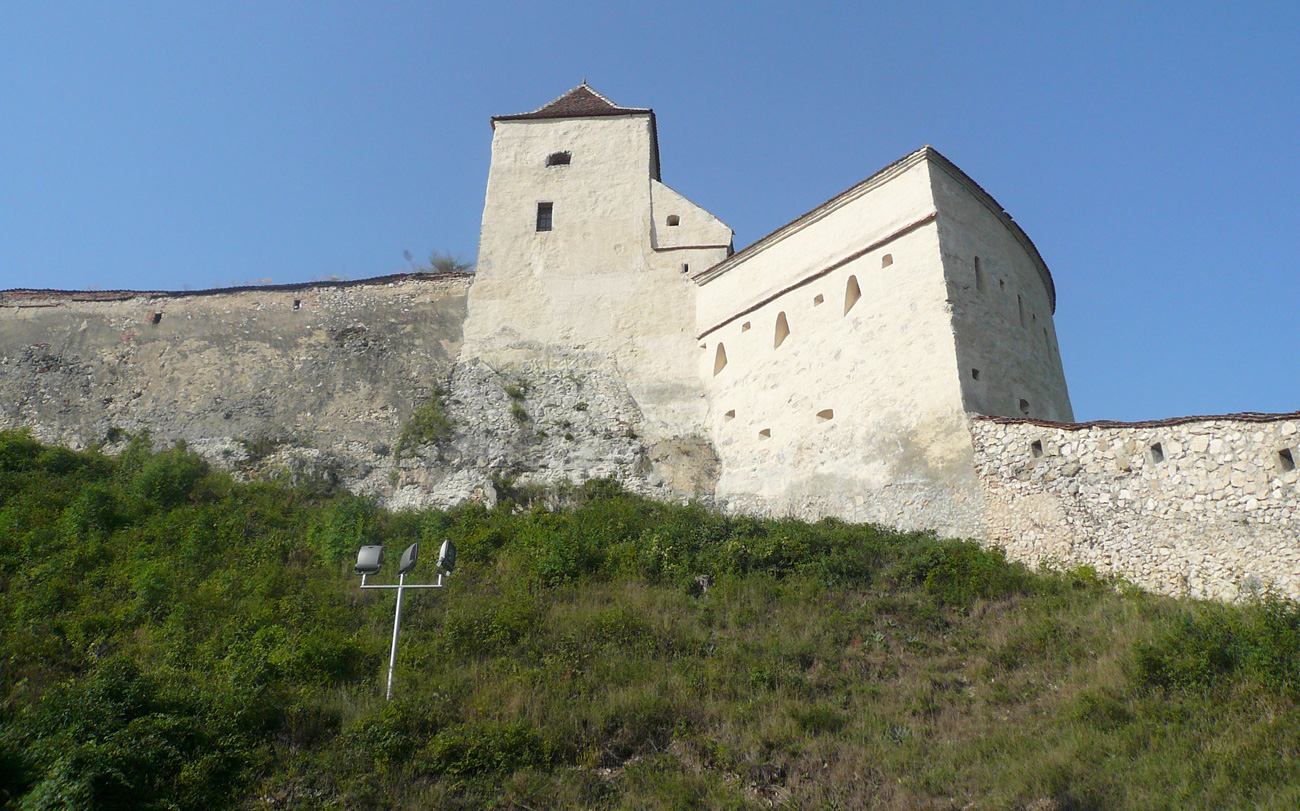
Southern wall (outside view)

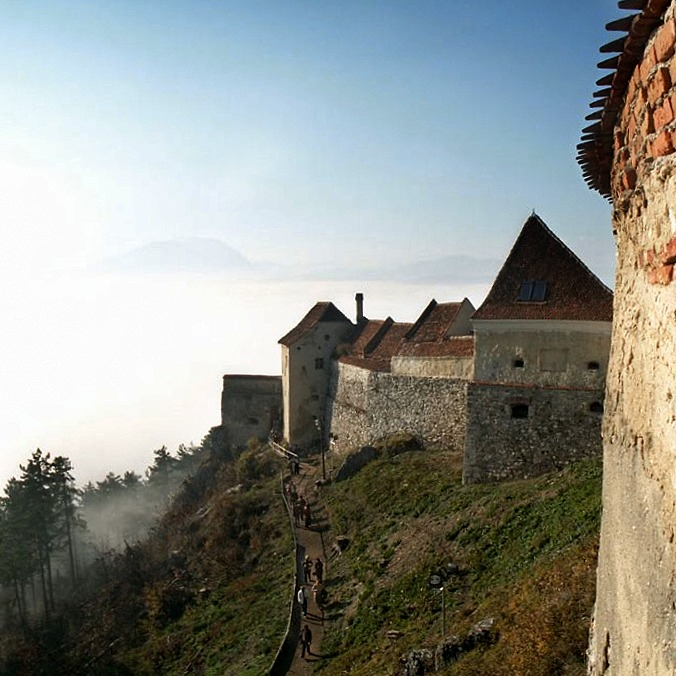
Access to western gate

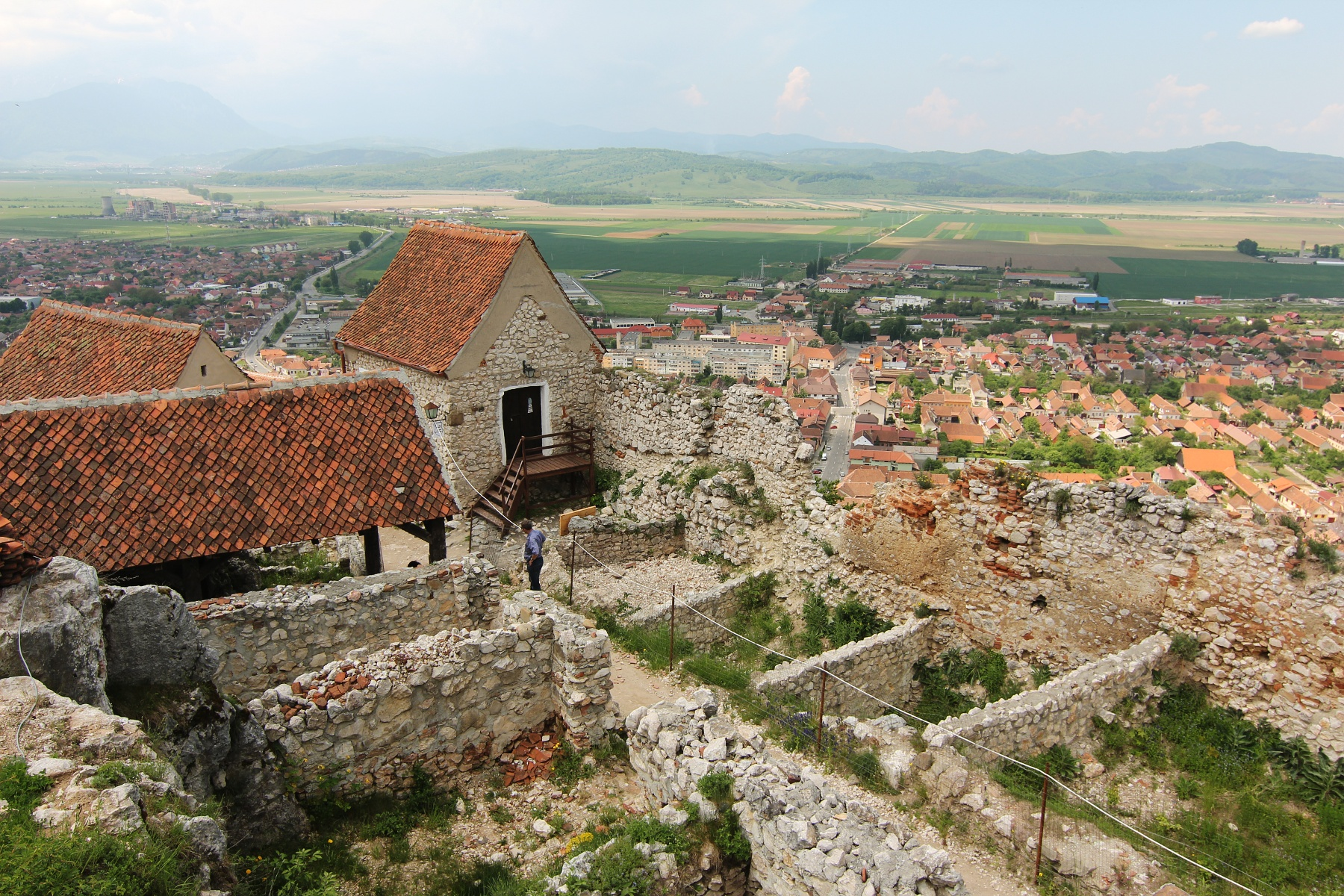
House ruins along the wall and town below

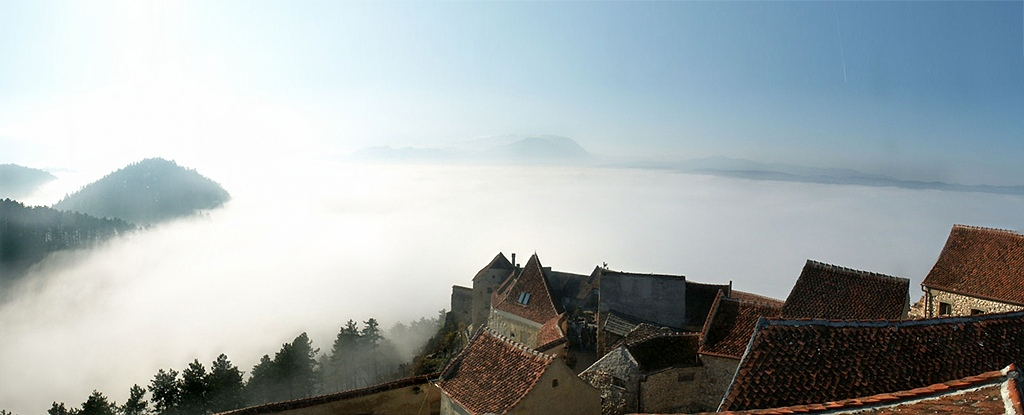
View from the top of the fortress; 04.12.2006

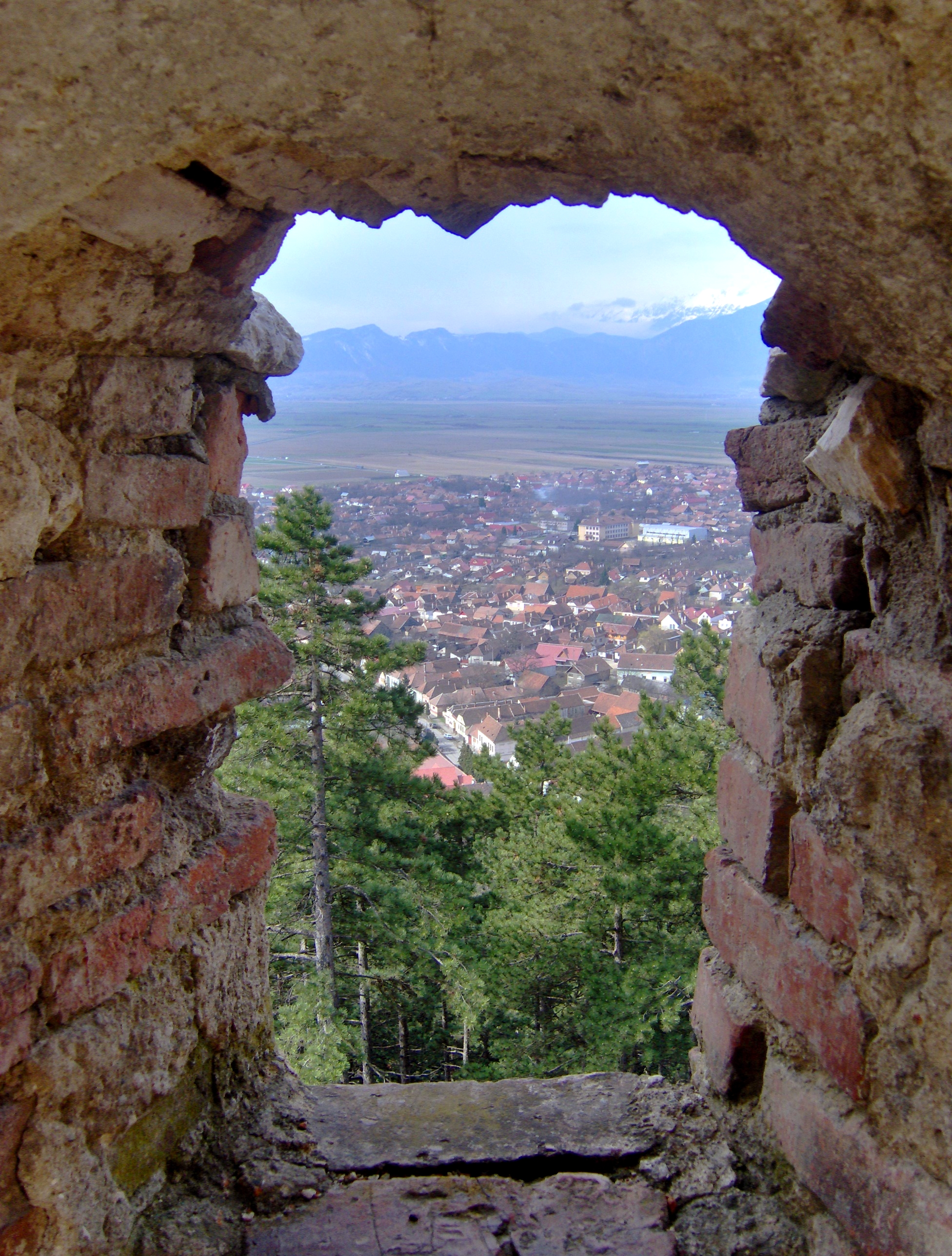
Râșnov seen through loophole

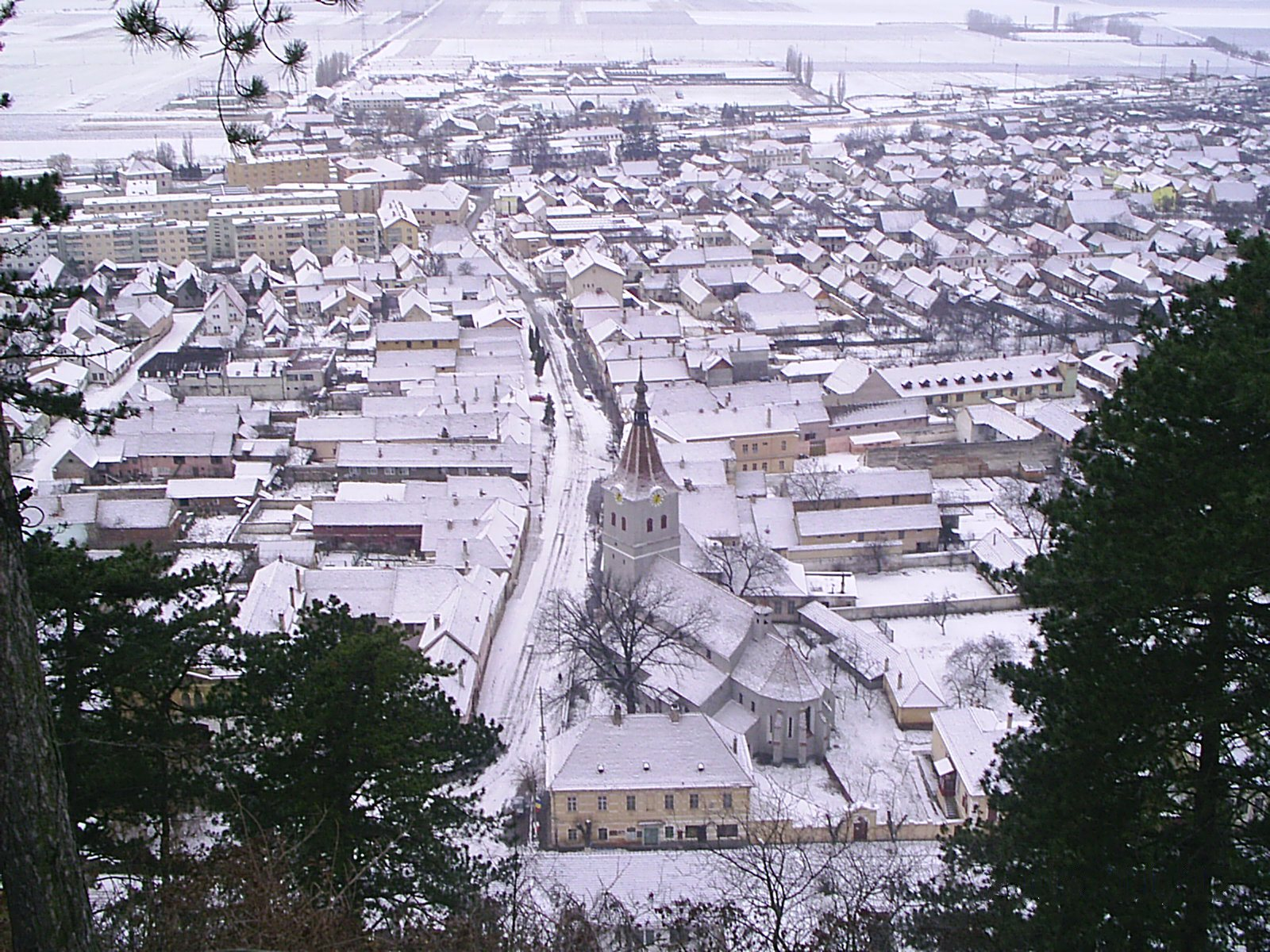
Râșnov with Saxon church from fortress hill

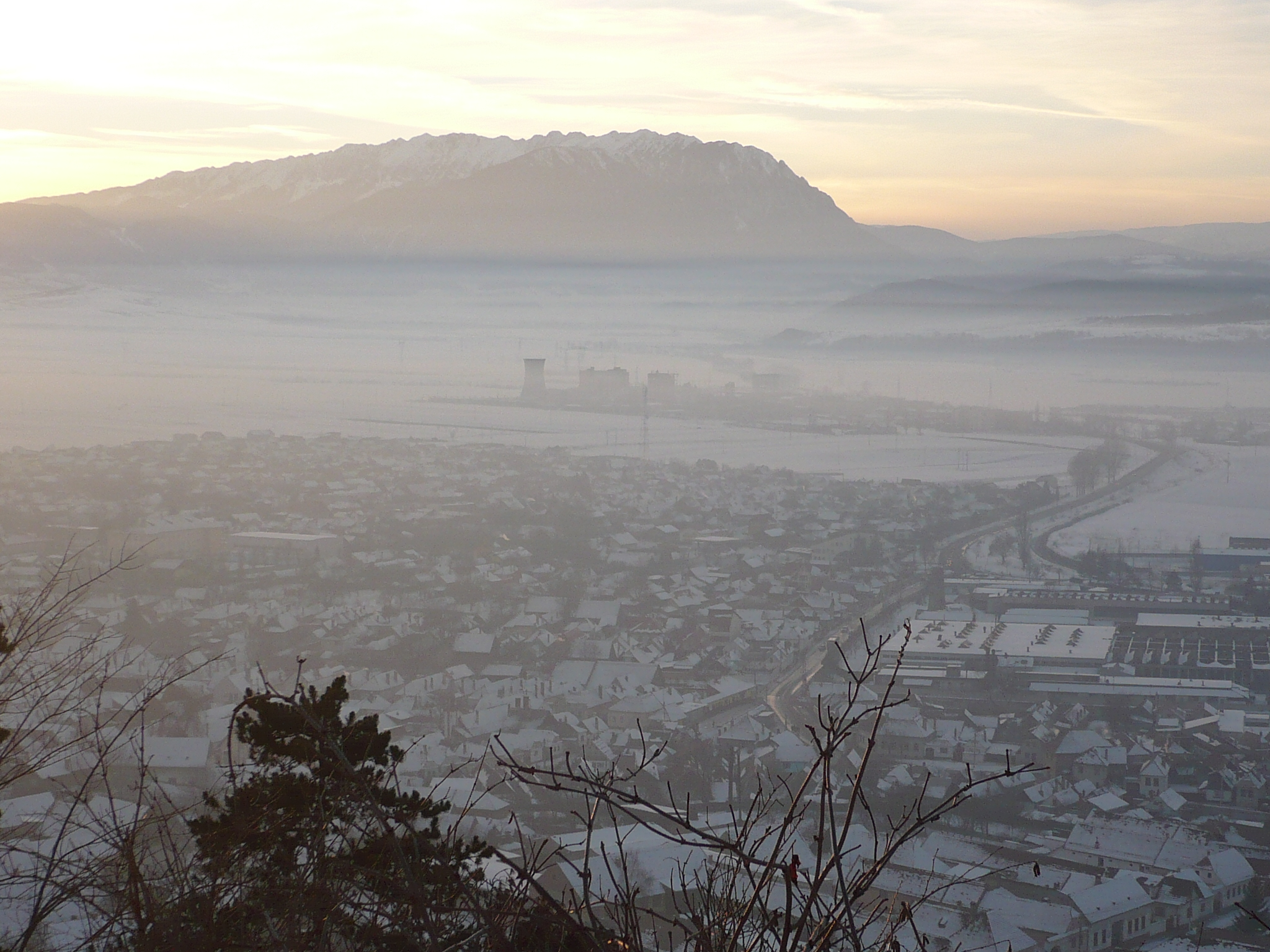
View of Piatra Craiului Mountains from the fortress
