= Brașovia Fortress =

Brașovia Citadel
- Romanian: Cetatea Brașovia
- Tâmpa mountain Near Brașov; Brașov County in Romania
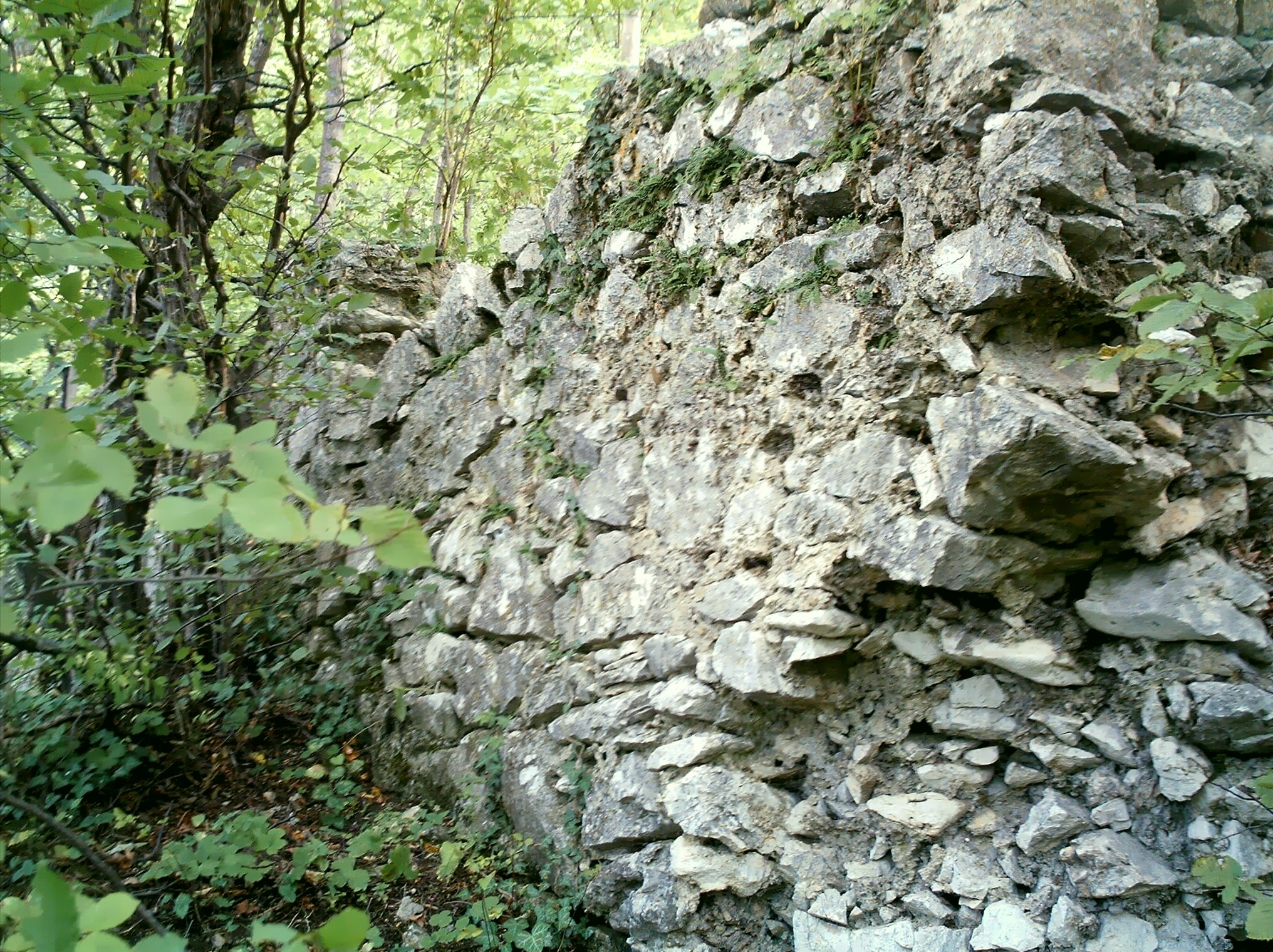
- Remains of a wall

Site information
- Type: Fortress
- Open to the public: Yes
- Condition: Ruins

Location
- Location within Romania
- Coordinates: 45°37′59″N 25°35′32″E

Site history
- Built by: Teutonic Order; Transylvanian Saxons
- Fate: Demolished 1448-1453

Brașovia Fortress
- Interactive map of the Brașovia Fortress area

General information
- Coordinates: 45°37′59″N 25°35′32″E

Brașovia Fortress (pronunciation: [braˈʃovi.a]) was a fortification located on the saddle of Tâmpa mountain at Brașov, Romania. John Hunyadi had it demolished by the beginning of 1455.
